= Archbasilica of Saint John Lateran =

Catholic landmark in Rome, Italy

Saint John Lateran
- Major Papal, Patriarchal and Roman Archbasilica, Metropolitan and Primatial Cathedral of the Most Holy Saviour and Saints John the Baptist and the Evangelist in Lateran, Mother and Head of All Churches in Rome and in the World
- (Note: Arcibasilica Papale Romana Maggiore di San Giovanni in Laterano (Italian); Archibasilica Sanctissimi Salvatoris ac Sanctorum Ioannis Baptistae et Ioannis Evangelistae ad Lateranum (Latin))
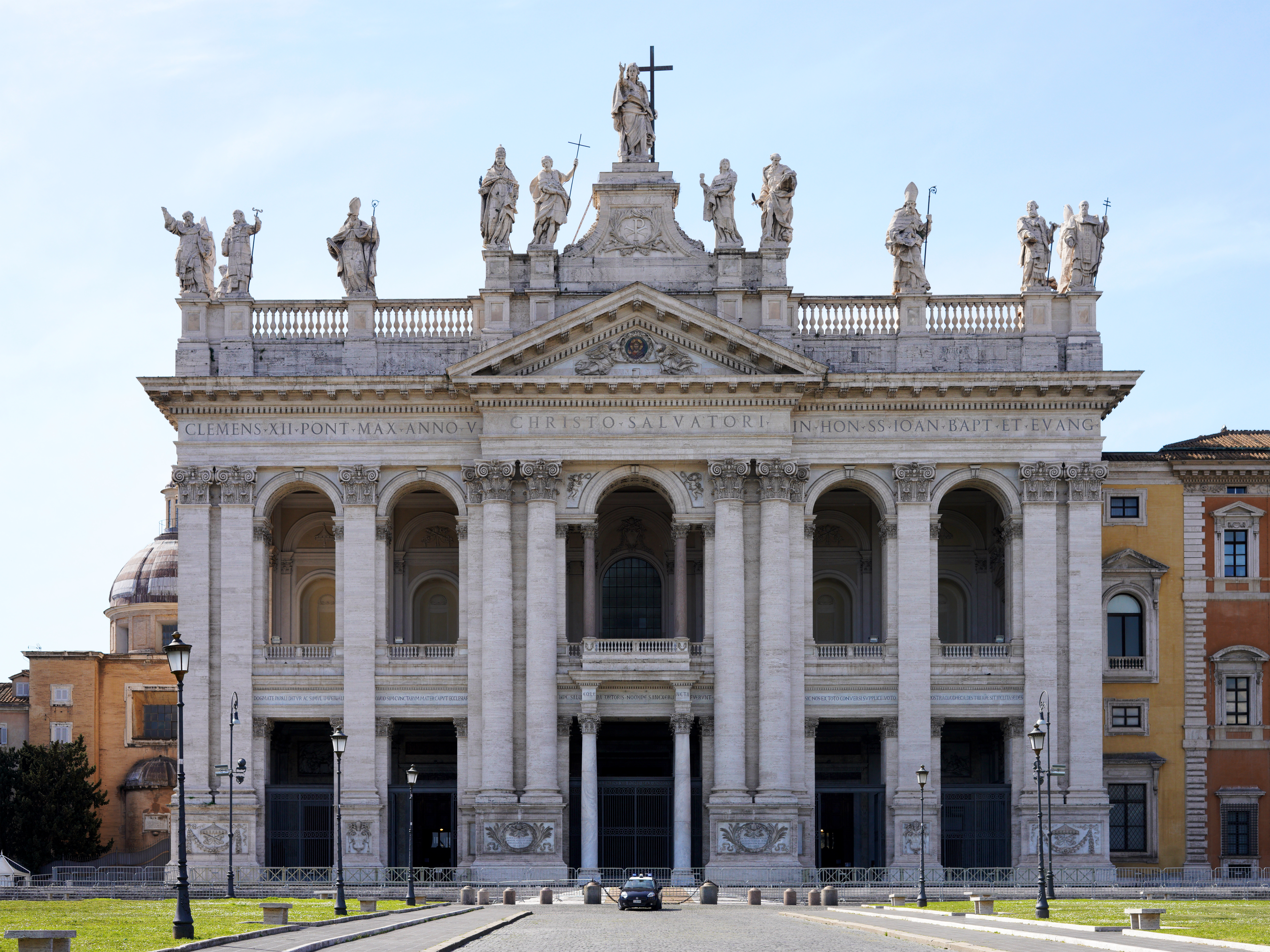
- Main façade by Alessandro Galilei
- Click on the map for a fullscreen view
- 41°53′09″N 12°30′22″E
- Location: Rome (Note: The archbasilica is within Italian territory and not the territory of the Vatican City State. (Lateran Treaty of 1929, Article 15 (The Treaty of the Lateran by Benedict Williamson; London: Burns, Oates, and Washbourne Limited, 1929; pages 42–66)) However, the Holy See fully owns the archbasilica, and Italy is legally obligated to recognize its full ownership thereof (Lateran Treaty of 1929, Article 13 (Ibidem)) and to concede to it "the immunity granted by International Law to the headquarters of the diplomatic agents of foreign States" (Lateran Treaty of 1929, Article 15 (Ibidem)).)
- Country: Italy
- Denomination: Catholic Church
- Sui iuris church: Latin Church
- Website: basilicasangiovanni.va

History
- Status: Papal major basilica, Cathedral
- Dedication: Christ the Saviour (primary); John the Baptist and John the Evangelist (secondary)
- Consecrated: AD 324

Architecture
- Architect: Alessandro Galilei
- Architectural type: Cathedral
- Style: Baroque, Neoclassical
- Groundbreaking: AD 4th century
- Completed: 1735

Specifications
- Length: 140 m (460 ft)
- Width: 73 m (240 ft)
- Materials: Marble, granite, and cement

Administration
- Diocese: Rome

Clergy
- Bishop: Pope Leo XIV
- Rector: Archpriest of the Archbasilica of Saint John Lateran; Cardinal Baldassare Reina

UNESCO World Heritage Site
- Official name: Historic Centre of Rome, the Properties of the Holy See in that City Enjoying Extraterritorial Rights and San Paolo Fuori le Mura
- Type: Cultural
- Criteria: i, ii, iii, iv, vi
- Designated: 1980 (4th session)
- Reference no.: 91
- Region: Europe and North America

The Archbasilica of Saint John Lateran (officially the Major Papal, Patriarchal and Roman Archbasilica, Metropolitan and Primatial Cathedral of the Most Holy Savior and Saints John the Baptist and the Evangelist in Lateran, Mother and Head of All Churches in Rome and in the World), (Note: Italian: Papale arcibasilica maggiore cattedrale del Santissimo Salvatore e dei Santi Giovanni Battista ed Evangelista in Laterano) commonly known as the Lateran Basilica or Saint John Lateran, is the Catholic cathedral of the Diocese of Rome in the city of Rome, Italy. It serves as the seat of the bishop of Rome and head of the worldwide Catholic Church: the pope. The only "archbasilica" in the world, it lies outside of Vatican City proper, which is located approximately four kilometres (2 1/2 miles) northwest. Nevertheless, as properties of the Holy See, the archbasilica and its adjoining edifices enjoy an extraterritorial status from Italy, pursuant to the terms of the Lateran Treaty of 1929. Dedicated to Christ the Saviour, in honor of John the Baptist and John the Evangelist, the place name – Laterano (Lateran) – comes from an ancient Roman family (gens), whose palace (domus) grounds occupied the site. The adjacent Lateran Palace was the primary residence of the pope until the Middle Ages.

The church is the oldest of the four major papal basilicas, and it is one of the Seven Pilgrim Churches of Rome. Founded in 324, it is the oldest public church in the city of Rome, and the oldest basilica in the Western world. It houses the cathedra of the Roman bishop, and it has the title of ecumenical mother church of the Catholic faithful. The building deteriorated during the Middle Ages and was badly damaged by two fires in the 14th century. It was rebuilt in the late 16th century during the reign of Pope Sixtus V. The new structure's interior was renovated in the late 17th century, and its façade was completed in 1735 under Pope Clement XII.

The current Rector is Cardinal Archpriest Baldassare Reina, Vicar General for the Diocese of Rome since 6 October 2024. The president of the French Republic, currently Emmanuel Macron, is ex officio the "First and Only Honorary Canon" of the archbasilica, a title that the heads of state of France have possessed since King Henry IV.

The large Latin inscription on the façade reads: Clemens XII Pont Max Anno V Christo Salvatori In Hon SS Ioan Bapt et Evang. This abbreviated inscription translates as: "The Supreme Pontiff Clement XII, in the fifth year [of his Pontificate, dedicated this building] to Christ the Saviour, in honor of Saints John the Baptist and [John] the Evangelist". Because Christ the Saviour is its primary dedication, its titular feast day is 6 August, the Transfiguration of Christ.

== Name ==
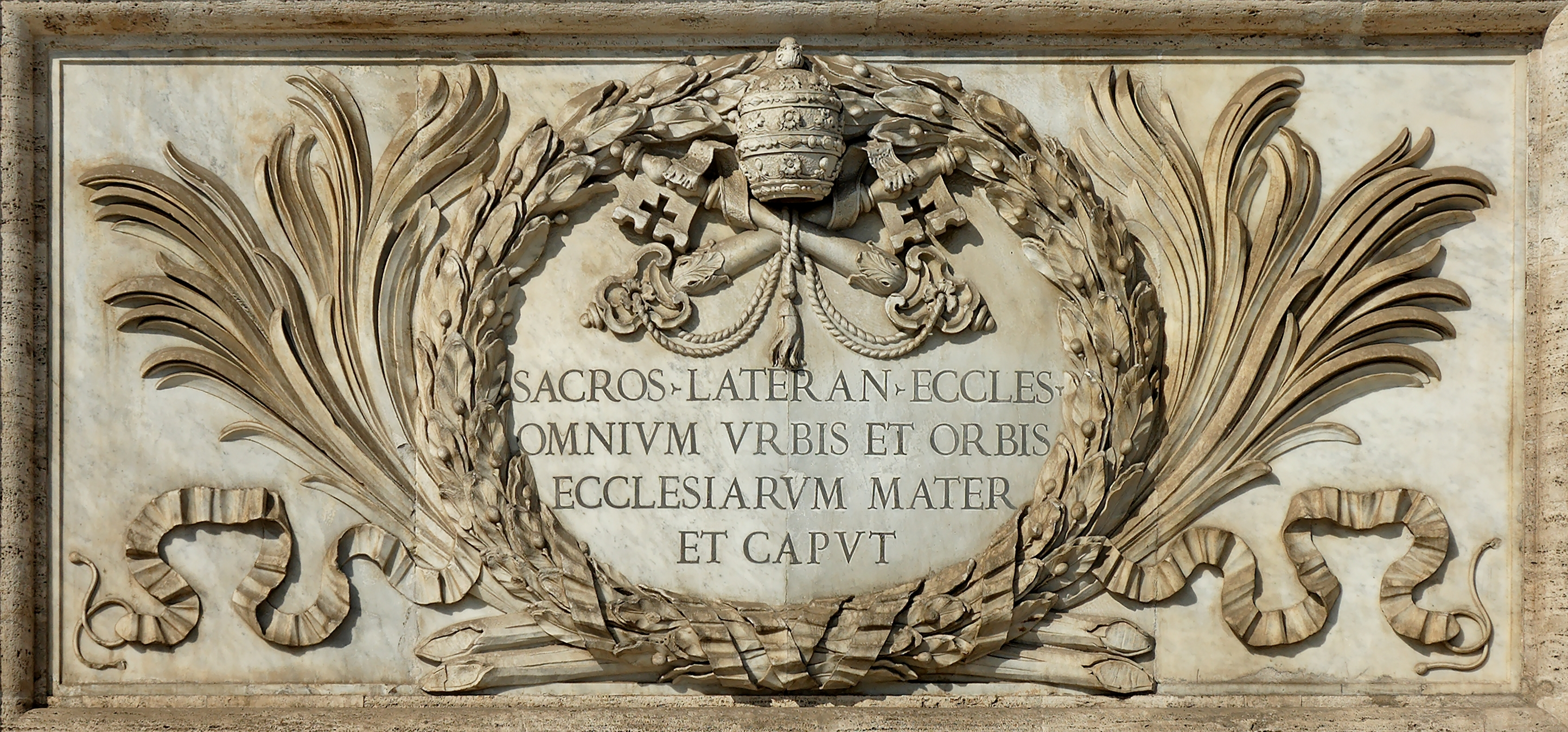
Next to the formal entrance is the archbasilica's declaration to be the head, or Mother Church, of the entire world, encircled by the laurel wreath and the Papal tiara.

The archbasilica's Latin name is Archibasilica Sanctissimi Salvatoris ac Sancti Ioannis Baptistae et Ioannis Evangelistae ad Lateranum, which in English is the Archbasilica of the Most Holy Savior and Saints John the Baptist and John the Evangelist at the Lateran, and in Italian Arcibasilica [Papale] del Santissimo Salvatore e Santi Giovanni Battista ed Evangelista in Laterano.

== History ==
=== Lateran Palace ===
The archbasilica stands over the remains of the Castra Nova equitum singularium, the "New Fort of the Roman imperial cavalry bodyguards". The fort was established by Septimius Severus in AD 193. Following the victory of Emperor Constantine the Great over Maxentius (for whom the Equites singulares augusti, the emperor's mounted bodyguards, had fought) at the Battle of the Milvian Bridge, the guard was abolished and the fort demolished. Substantial remains of the fort lie directly beneath the nave.

The remainder of the site was occupied during the early Roman Empire by the palace of the gens Laterani. Sextius Lateranus was the first plebeian to attain the rank of consul, and the Laterani served as administrators for several emperors. One of the Laterani, Consul-designate Plautius Lateranus, became famous for being accused by Nero of conspiracy against the Emperor. The accusation resulted in the confiscation and redistribution of his properties.

The Lateran Palace fell into the hands of the Emperor when Constantine the Great married his second wife Fausta, sister of Maxentius. Known by that time as the Domus Faustae or "House of Fausta", the Lateran Palace was eventually given to the Bishop of Rome by Constantine the Great during the pontificate of Pope Miltiades, in time to host a synod of bishops in 314 that was convened to challenge the Donatist schism, declaring Donatism to be heresy. The palace basilica was converted and extended, becoming the residence of Pope Sylvester I, eventually becoming the Cathedral of Rome, the seat of the Popes as the Bishops of Rome.

=== Early Church ===
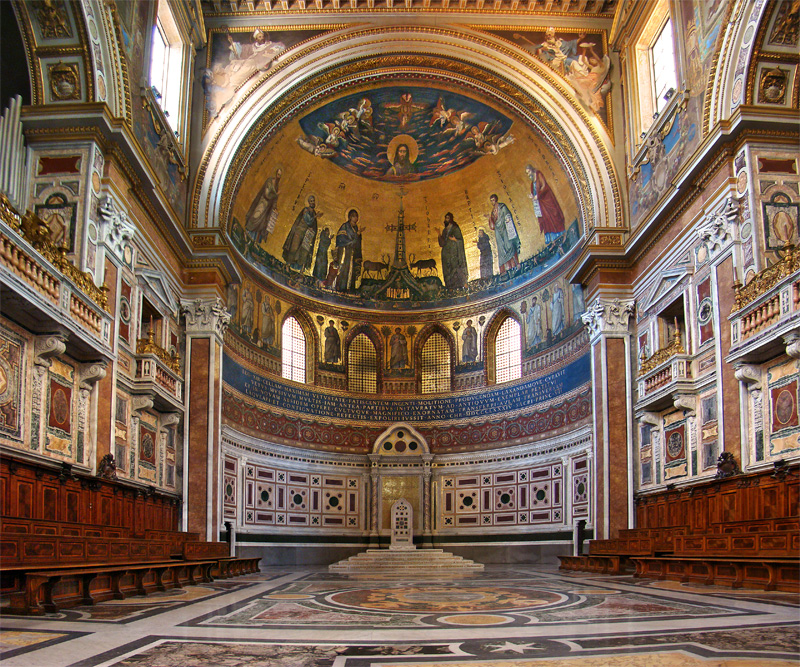
The papal cathedra, the presence of which renders the archbasilica the cathedral of Rome, is located in its apse. The decorations are in cosmatesque style.

Pope Sylvester I presided over the official dedication of the archbasilica and the adjacent Lateran Palace in 324, changing the name from Domus Fausta to Domus Dei ("House of God"), with a dedication to Christ the Savior (Christo Salvatori). When a cathedra became a symbol of episcopal authority, the papal cathedra was placed in its interior, rendering it the cathedral of the Pope as Bishop of Rome. When Gregory the Great sent the Gregorian mission to England under Augustine of Canterbury, some original churches in Canterbury took the Roman plan as a model, dedicating a church both to Christ as well as one to Saint Paul, outside the walls of the city. The church name "Christ Church", so common for churches around the world today in Anglophone Anglican contexts, originally came from Canterbury's Cathedral of Christ, which was named after St. John Lateran's original name.

The anniversary of the dedication of the church has been observed as a feast since the 12th century, with 9 November as the feast.

=== The Middle Ages ===
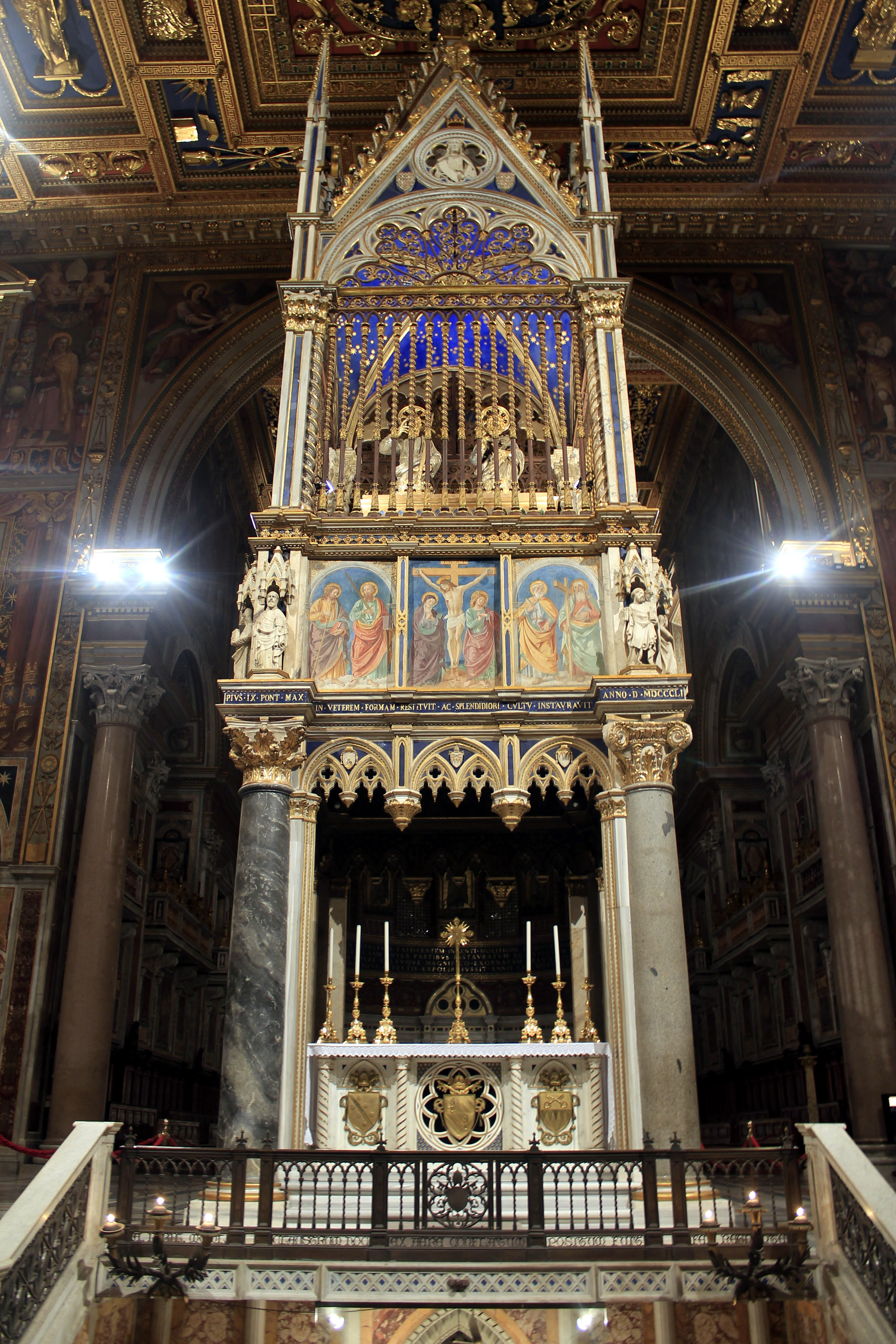
The high altar and the 14th-century Gothic ciborium. The relic of the original wooden altar used by Saint Peter comprises the high altar. Above the ciborium are statues of SS Peter and Paul.

On the archbasilica's front wall between the main portals is a plaque inscribed with the words SACROS LATERAN ECCLES OMNIUM VRBIS ET ORBIS ECCLESIARVM MATER ET CAPVT ("Most Holy Lateran Church, mother and head of all the churches in the city and the world"); a visible indication of the declaration that the basilica is the "mother church" of all the world. In the twelfth century the canons of the Lateran claimed that the high altar housed the Ark of the Covenant and several holy objects from Jerusalem. The basilica was thus presented as the Temple of the New Covenant.

The archbasilica and Lateran Palace were re-dedicated twice. Pope Sergius III dedicated them in honor of Saint John the Baptist in the 10th century, occasioned by the newly consecrated baptistry of the archbasilica. Pope Lucius II dedicated them in honor of John the Evangelist in the 13th century. Thus, Saint John the Baptist and Saint John the Evangelist became co-patrons of the archbasilica, while the primary Titular is still Christ the Savior, as the inscription in the entrance indicates and as is traditional for patriarchal cathedrals. Consequently, the archbasilica remains dedicated to the Savior, and its titular feast is the Feast of the Transfiguration of Christ on 6 August. The archbasilica became the most important shrine of the two Saint Johns, albeit infrequently jointly venerated. In later years, a Benedictine monastery was established in the Lateran Palace, and was devoted to serving the archbasilica and the two saints.

Every pope, beginning with Pope Miltiades, occupied the Lateran Palace until the reign of the French Pope Clement V, who in 1309 transferred the seat of the papacy to Avignon, a papal fiefdom that was an enclave in France. The Lateran Palace has also been the site of five ecumenical councils (see Lateran councils).

=== Fires and reconstruction ===
During the time the papacy was seated in Avignon, France, the Lateran Palace and the archbasilica deteriorated. Two fires ravaged them in 1308 and 1362. After both fires the pope sent money from Avignon to pay for their reconstruction and maintenance. Nonetheless, the archbasilica and Lateran Palace lost their former splendor. When the papacy returned from Avignon and the pope again resided in Rome, the archbasilica and the Lateran Palace were deemed inadequate considering their accumulated damage. The popes resided at the Basilica di Santa Maria in Trastevere and later at the Basilica di Santa Maria Maggiore. Eventually, the Palace of the Vatican was built adjacent to the Basilica of Saint Peter, which existed since the time of Emperor Constantine I, and the popes began to reside there. It has remained the official residence of the pope ever since, though Pope Francis chose to reside in the Domus Sanctae Marthae in the Vatican City, not in the Papal apartments.

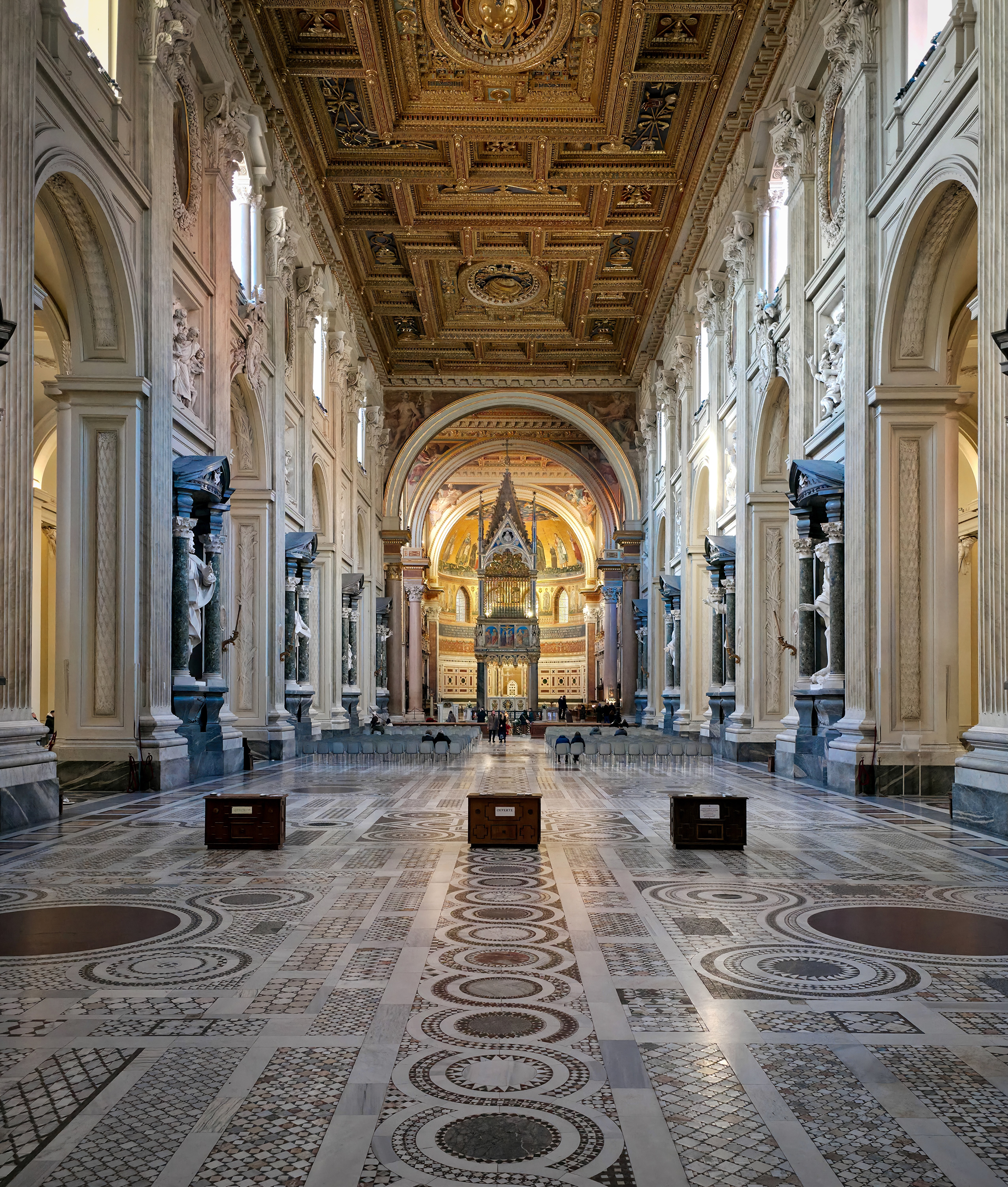
Main body of the basilica, after the radical transformation by Francesco Borromini in the 17th century

There were several attempts at reconstruction of the archbasilica before a definitive program of Pope Sixtus V. Sixtus V hired his favorite architect, Domenico Fontana, to supervise much of the project. The original Lateran Palace was demolished and replaced with a new edifice. On the square in front of the Lateran Palace is San Giovanni Addolorata Hospital and the largest standing ancient Egyptian obelisk in the world, known as the Lateran Obelisk. It weighs an estimated 455 tons. It was commissioned by the Egyptian Pharaoh Thutmose III and erected by Thutmose IV before the great Karnak temple of Thebes, Egypt. Intended by Emperor Constantine I to be shipped to Constantinople, the very preoccupied Constantius II had it shipped instead to Rome, where it was erected in the Circus Maximus in AD 357. At some time it broke and was buried under the Circus. In the 16th century it was discovered and excavated, and Sixtus V had it re-erected on a new pedestal on 3 August 1588 at its present site.

Further renovation of the interior of the archbasilica ensued under the direction of Francesco Borromini, commissioned by Pope Innocent X for the 1650 Jubilee. The twelve niches created by his architectural scheme were eventually filled in 1718 with statues of the Apostles, sculpted by the most prominent Roman Rococo sculptors. Under Alexander VII Borromini also oversaw the removal of the doors of the Curia Julia and their restoration in the front entrance of the archbasilica. The restored doors feature motifs of the Chigi family. During the disassembly of the doors for transportation ancient coins from the reign of Domitian were found.

The vision of Pope Clement XII for reconstruction was an ambitious one in which he launched a competition to design a new façade. More than 23 architects competed, mostly working in the then-current Baroque idiom. The putatively impartial jury was chaired by Sebastiano Conca, president of the Roman Academy of Saint Luke. The winner of the competition was Alessandro Galilei.

The façade as it appears today was completed in 1735. It reads in Latin: Clemens XII Pont Max Anno V Christo Salvatori In Hon SS Ioan Bapt et Evang; this highly abbreviated inscription is expanded thus: Clemens XII, Pont[ifex] Max[imus], [in] Anno V, [dedicavit hoc aedificium] Christo Salvatori, in hon[orem] [sanctorum] Ioan[is] Bapt[tistae] et Evang[elistae]. This translates as "Pope Clement XII, Pontifex Maximus, in the fifth year of his reign, dedicated this building to Christ the Savior, in honor of Saints John the Baptist and John the Evangelist". Galilei's façade removed all vestiges of traditional, ancient, basilical architecture and imparted a neo-classical facade.

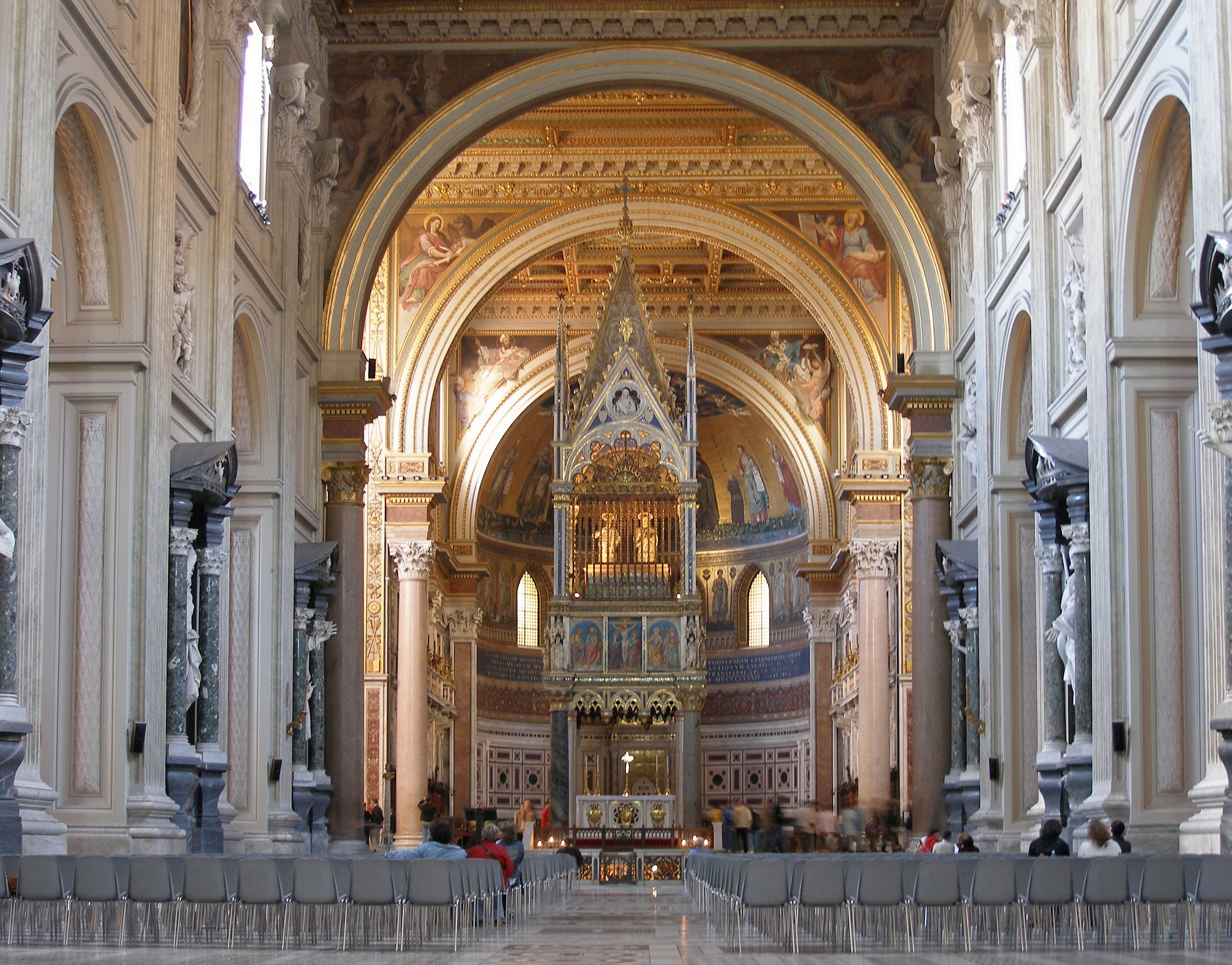
Nave

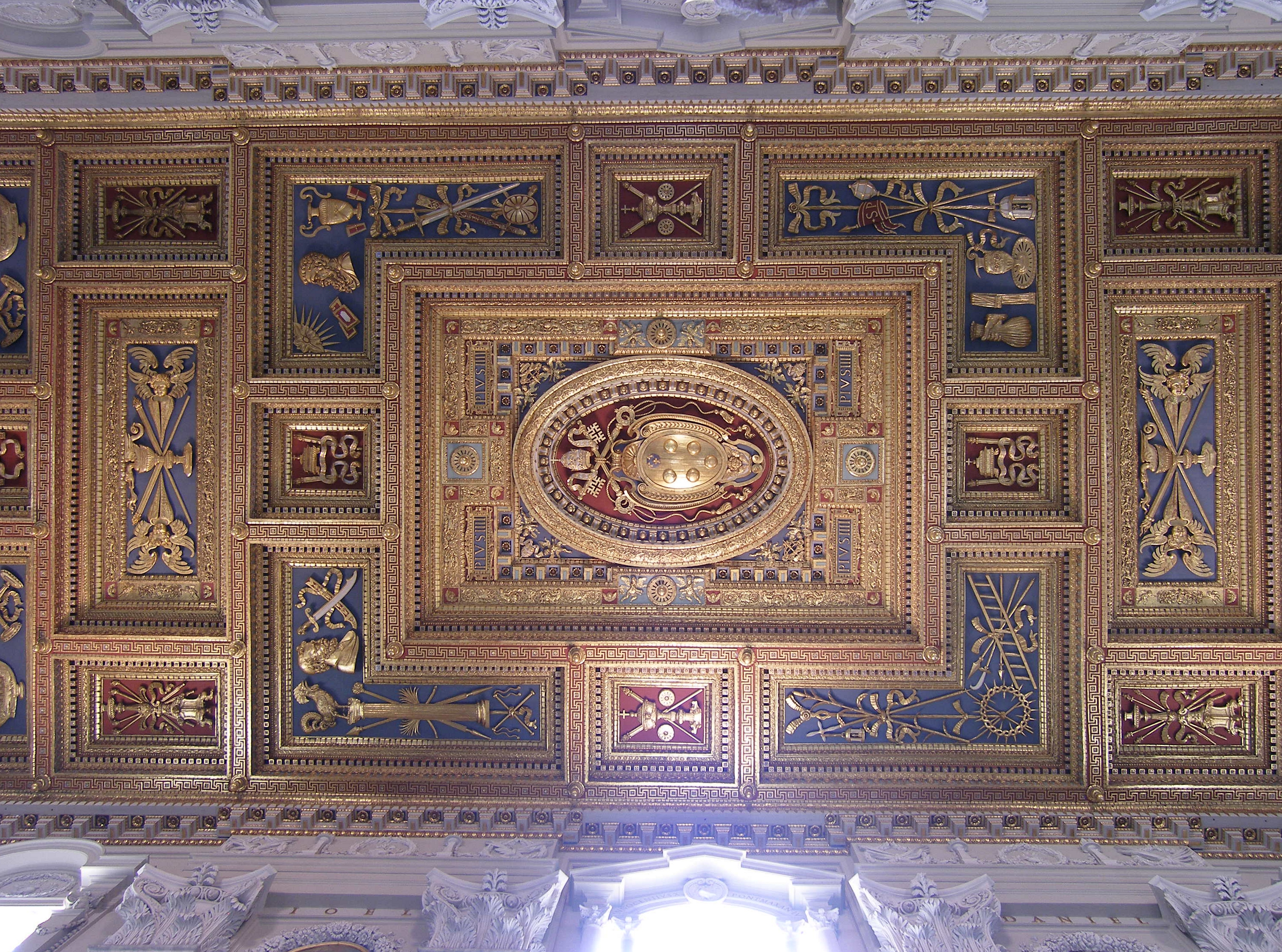
Ceiling

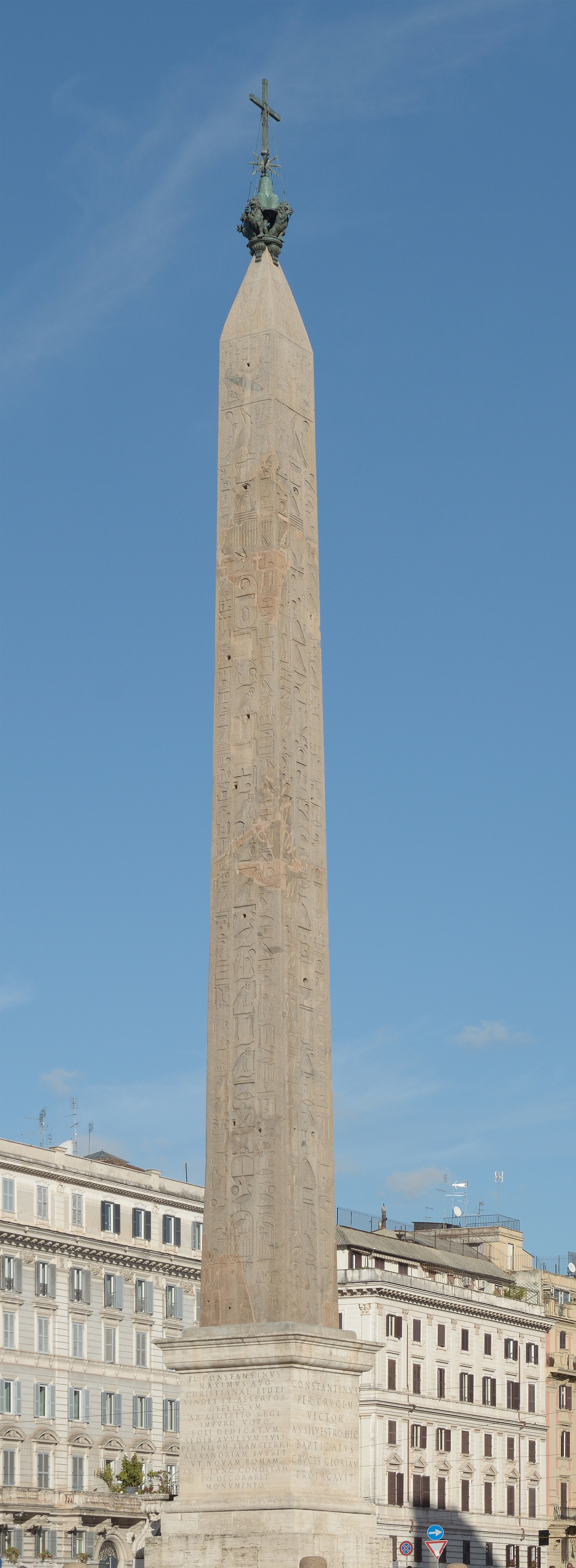
The Lateran Obelisk

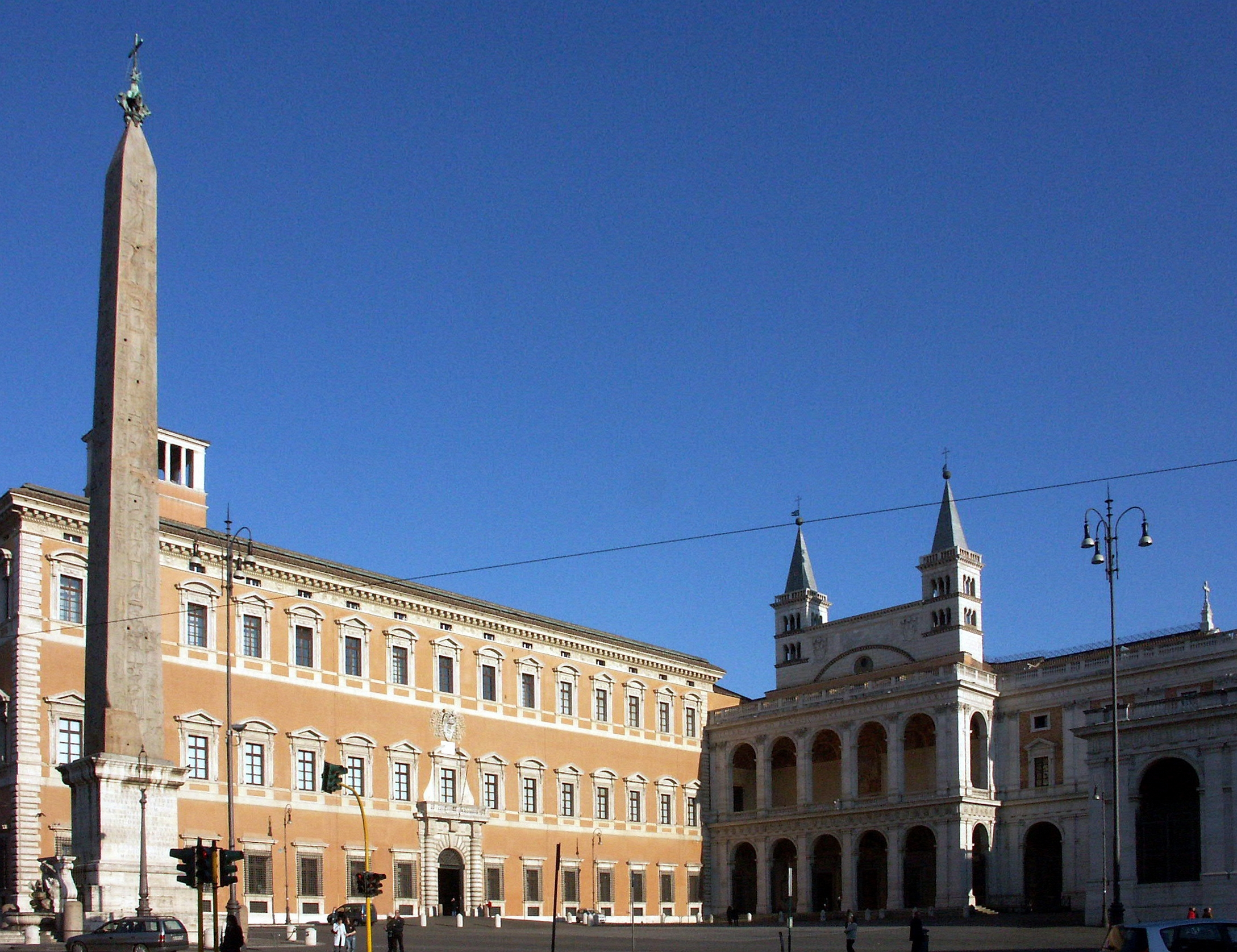
The Loggia delle Benedizioni, on the rear left side. Annexed, on the left, is the Lateran Palace.

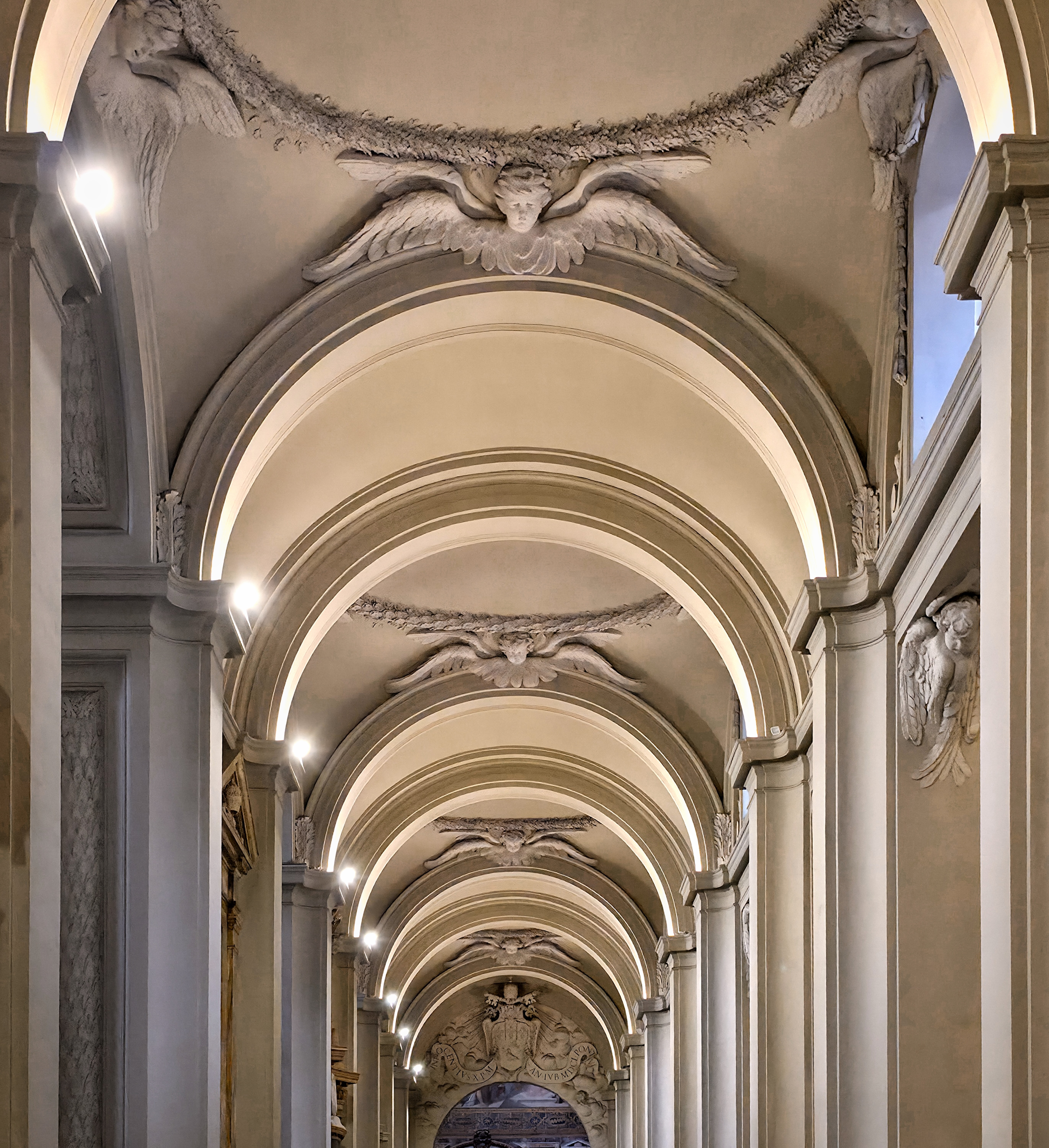
Borromini's nave aisle

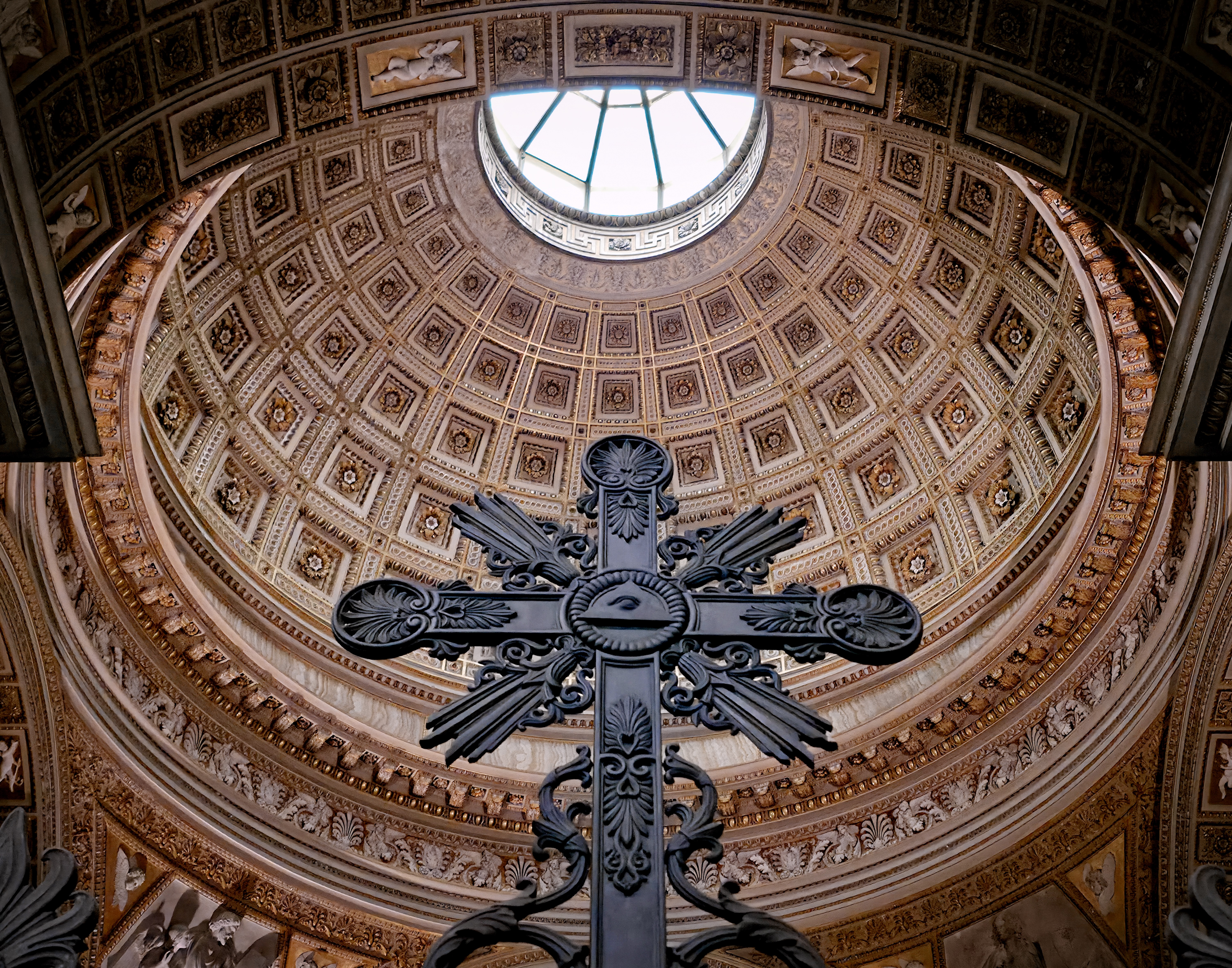
Torlonia Chapel Dome

=== World War II ===
During the Second World War, the Lateran and its related buildings were used under Pope Pius XII as a safe haven from the Nazis and Italian Fascists for numbers of Jews and other refugees. Among those who found shelter there were Meuccio Ruini, Alcide De Gasperi, Pietro Nenni and others. The Daughters of Charity of Saint Vincent de Paul and the sixty orphan refugees they cared for were ordered to leave their convent on the Via Carlo Emanuele. The Sisters of Maria Bambina, who staffed the kitchen at the Pontifical Major Roman Seminary at the Lateran offered a wing of their convent. The grounds also housed Italian soldiers.

Vincenzo Fagiolo and Pietro Palazzini, vice-rector of the seminary, were recognized by Yad Vashem for their efforts to assist Jews.

== Architecture ==
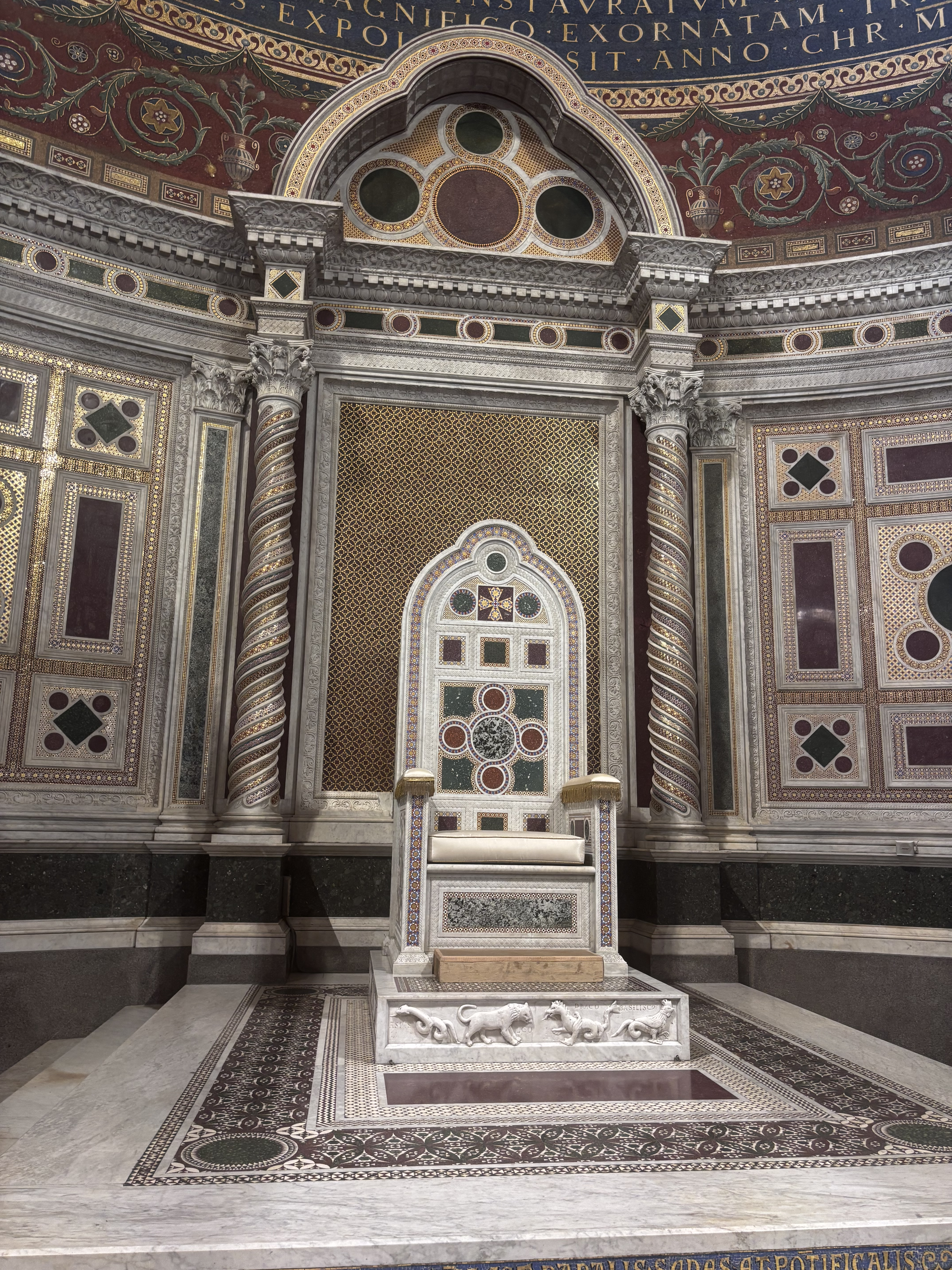
The Papal Throne

=== History ===
An apse lined with mosaics and open to the air still preserves the memory of one of the most famous halls of the ancient palace, the "Triclinium" of Pope Leo III, which was the state banqueting hall. The existing structure is not ancient, but some portions of the original mosaics may have been preserved in the tripartite mosaic of its niche. In the center Christ gives to the Apostles their mission; on the left he gives the keys of the kingdom of heaven to Pope Sylvester I and the Labarum to Emperor Constantine I; and on the right Peter gives the papal stole to Pope Leo III and the standard to Charlemagne.

Some few remains of the original buildings may still be traced in the city walls outside the Gate of Saint John, and a large wall decorated with paintings was uncovered in the 18th century within the archbasilica behind the Lancellotti Chapel. A few traces of older buildings were also revealed during the excavations of 1880, when the work of extending the apse was in progress, but nothing of importance was published.

A great many donations from the Popes and other benefactors to the archbasilica are recorded in the Liber Pontificalis, and its splendor at an early period was such that it became known as the "Basilica Aurea", or "Golden Basilica". This splendor drew upon it the attack of the Vandals, who stripped it of all its treasures. Pope Leo I restored it around AD 460, and it was again restored by Pope Hadrian I.

In 897, it was almost totally destroyed by an earthquake: ab altari usque ad portas cecidit ("it collapsed from the altar to the doors"). The damage was so extensive that it was difficult to trace the lines of the old building, but these were mostly respected and the new building was of the same dimensions as the old. This second basilica stood for 400 years before it burned in 1308. It was rebuilt by Pope Clement V and Pope John XXII. It burned once more in 1360, and was rebuilt by Pope Urban V.

Through vicissitudes the archbasilica retained its ancient form, being divided by rows of columns into aisles, and having in front a peristyle surrounded by colonnades with a fountain in the middle, the conventional Late Antique format that was also followed by the old Saint Peter's Basilica. The façade had three windows and was embellished with a mosaic representing Christ as the Savior of the world.

The porticoes were frescoed, probably not earlier than the 12th century, commemorating the Roman fleet under Vespasian, the taking of Jerusalem, the Baptism of Emperor Constantine I and his "Donation" of the Papal States to the Catholic Church. Inside the archbasilica the columns no doubt ran, as in all other basilicas of the same date, the whole length of the church, from east to west.

In one of the rebuildings, probably that which was carried out by Pope Clement V, a transverse nave was introduced, imitated no doubt from the one which had been added, long before this, to the Basilica of Saint Paul Outside the Walls. Probably at this time the archbasilica was enlarged.

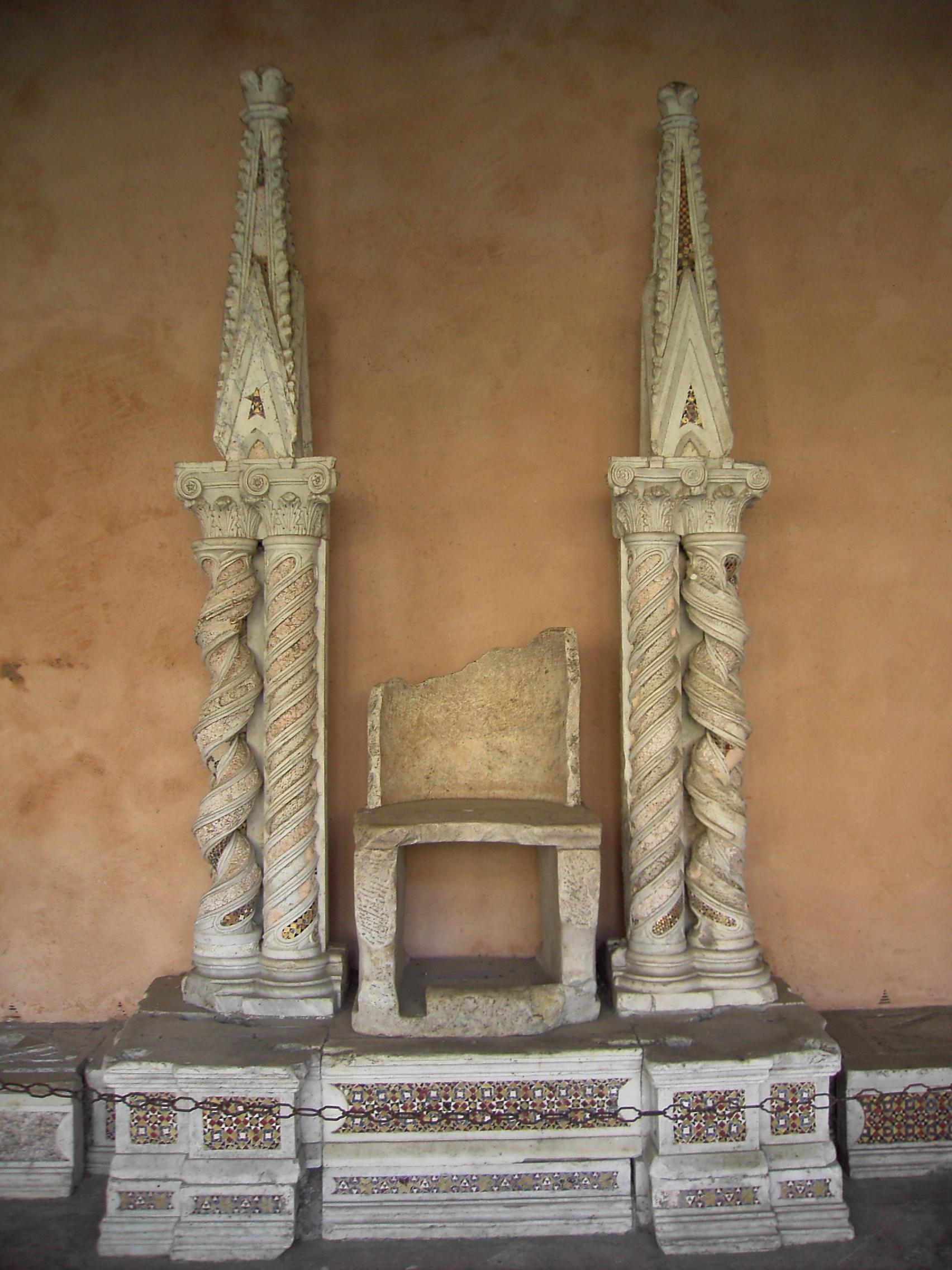
The sedia stercoraria where Psalm 112 was sung in the distant past

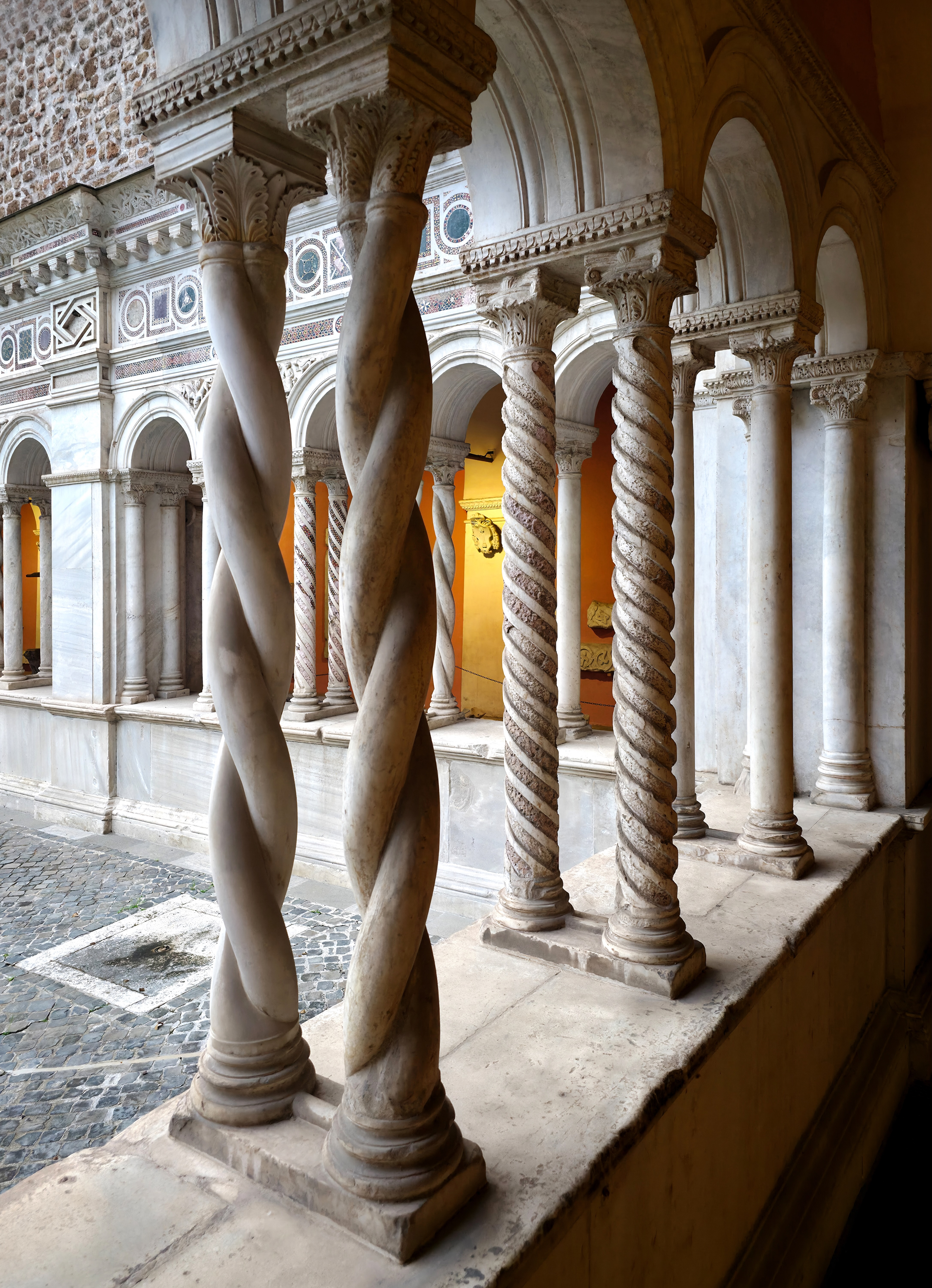
Lateran Cloister

Some portions of the older buildings survive. Among them the pavement of medieval Cosmatesque work, and the statues of Saint Peter and Saint Paul, now in the cloister. The graceful ciborium over the high altar, which looks out of place in its present surroundings, dates from 1369. The throne of red marble on which the popes sat is now in the Vatican Museums. It was part of a pair, but the other was plundered and taken away by Napoleon and is now in the Louvre. Another papal throne, the sedia stercoraria, is now in the Lateran Cloister. It owes its unsavory name to the anthem sung at previous papal coronations, "De stercore erigens pauperem" ("lifting up the poor out of the dunghill", from Psalm 112).

From the 5th century, there were seven oratories surrounding the archbasilica. These before long were incorporated into the church. The devotion of visiting these oratories, which was maintained through the Mediaeval Ages, gave rise to the similar devotion of the seven altars, still common in many churches of Rome and elsewhere.

Of the façade by Alessandro Galilei (1735), the cliché assessment has been that it is the façade of a palace, not of a church. Galilei's front, which is a screen across the older front creating a narthex or vestibule, does express the nave and double aisles of the archbasilica, which required a central bay wider than the rest of the sequence. Galilei provided it, without abandoning the range of identical arch-headed openings, by extending the central window by flanking columns that support the arch, in the familiar Serlian motif.

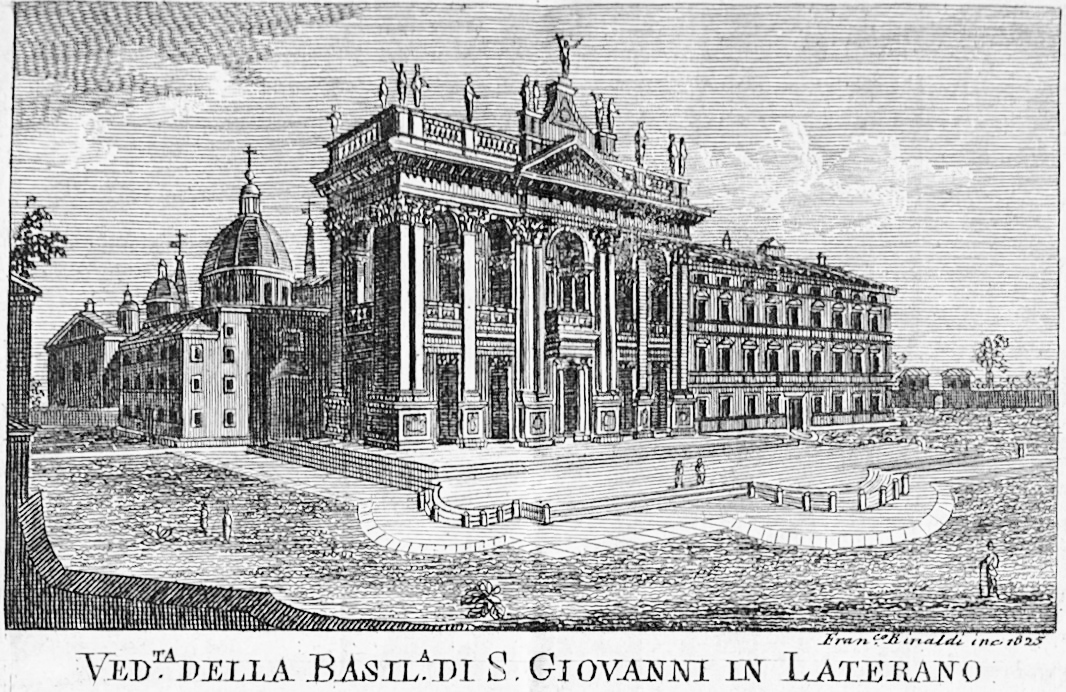
Archbasilica of Saint John Lateran, Lithograph, 1825

By bringing the central bay forward very slightly, and capping it with a pediment that breaks into the roof balustrade, Galilei provided an entrance doorway on a more than colossal scale, framed in the paired colossal Corinthian pilasters that tie together the façade in the manner introduced at Michelangelo's palace on the Campidoglio.

In the narthex of the church, is a 4th-century statue of emperor Constantine. It was found elsewhere in Rome, and moved to this site by order of Pope Clement XII.

Between the archbasilica and the city wall there was a great monastery, in which dwelt the community of monks whose duty it was to provide the services in the archbasilica. The only part of it which still survives is the 13th century cloister, surrounded by columns of inlaid marble. They are of a style intermediate between the Romanesque proper and the Gothic, and are the work of Vassellectus and the Cosmati.

=== Statues of the Apostles ===
The twelve niches created in Francesco Borromini's architecture were left vacant for decades. When in 1702 Pope Clement XI and Benedetto Cardinal Pamphili, archpriests of the archbasilica, announced their grand scheme for twelve larger-than-life sculptures of the Apostles (Judas Iscariot replaced by Saint Paul, instead of Saint Matthias) to fill the niches, the commission was opened to all the premier sculptors of late Baroque Rome. (Note: "The largest sculptural task in Rome during the early eighteenth century," per Rudolf Wittkower, Art and Architecture in Italy, 1600–1750, Revised Edition, 1965, p. 290, provides that "the distribution for commissions is, at the same time, a good yardstick for measuring the reputation of contemporary sculptors.") Each statue was to be sponsored by an illustrious prince with the Pope himself sponsoring that of Saint Peter and Cardinal Pamphili that of Saint John the Evangelist. Most of the sculptors were given a sketch drawn by Pope Clement's favorite painter, Carlo Maratta, to which they were to adhere, but with the notable exception being Pierre Le Gros the Younger, who successfully refused to sculpt to Maratta's design and consequently was not given a sketch.

The sculptors and their sculptures follow and are dated according to Conforti (the dates reflect archival findings but models for most must have existed before):

- Pierre-Étienne Monnot
  - Saint Paul (1704–1708)
  - Saint Peter (1704–1711)
- Francesco Moratti
  - Saint Simon (1704–1709)
- Lorenzo Ottoni
  - Saint Jude Thaddeus (1704–1709)
- Giuseppe Mazzuoli
  - Saint Philip (1705–1711)
- Pierre Le Gros
  - Saint Thomas (1705–1711)
  - Saint Bartholomew (c. 1705–1712)
- Angelo de' Rossi
  - Saint James the Lesser (1705–1711)
- Camillo Rusconi
  - Saint Andrew (1705–1709)
  - Saint John (1705–1711)
  - Saint Matthew (1711–1715)
  - Saint James the Greater (1715–1718)

South wall

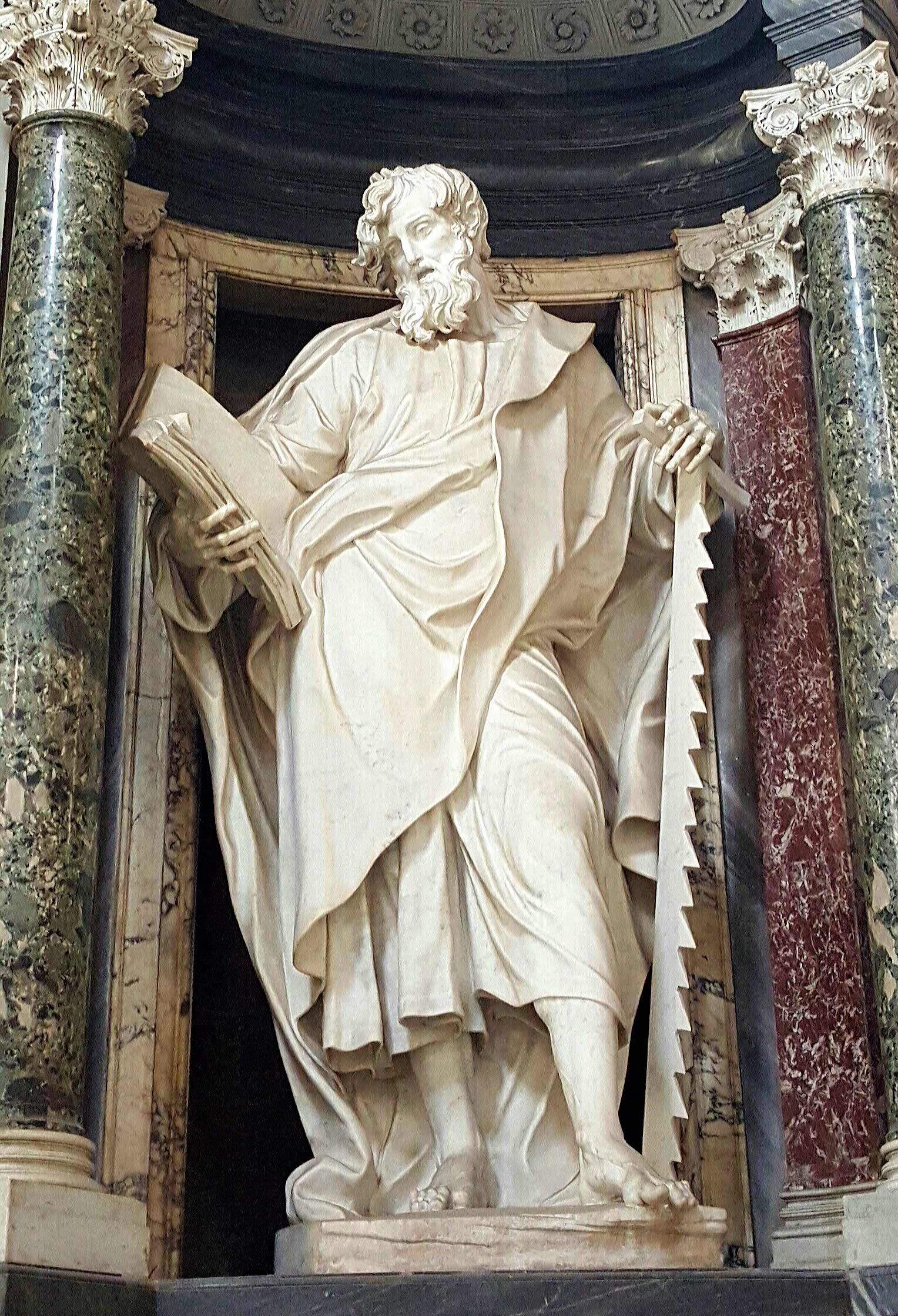
Saint Simon
by Moratti

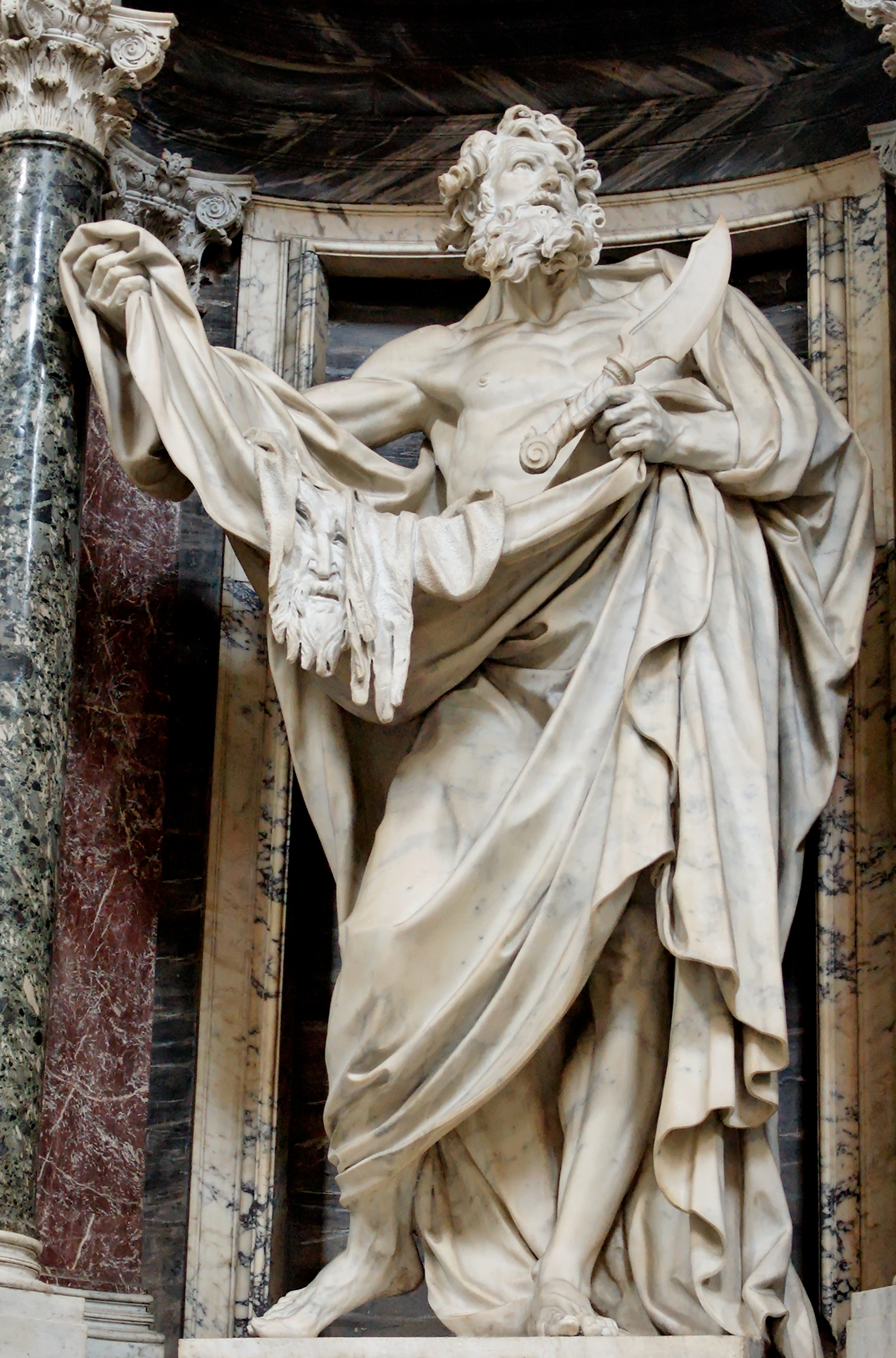
Saint Bartholomew
by Le Gros

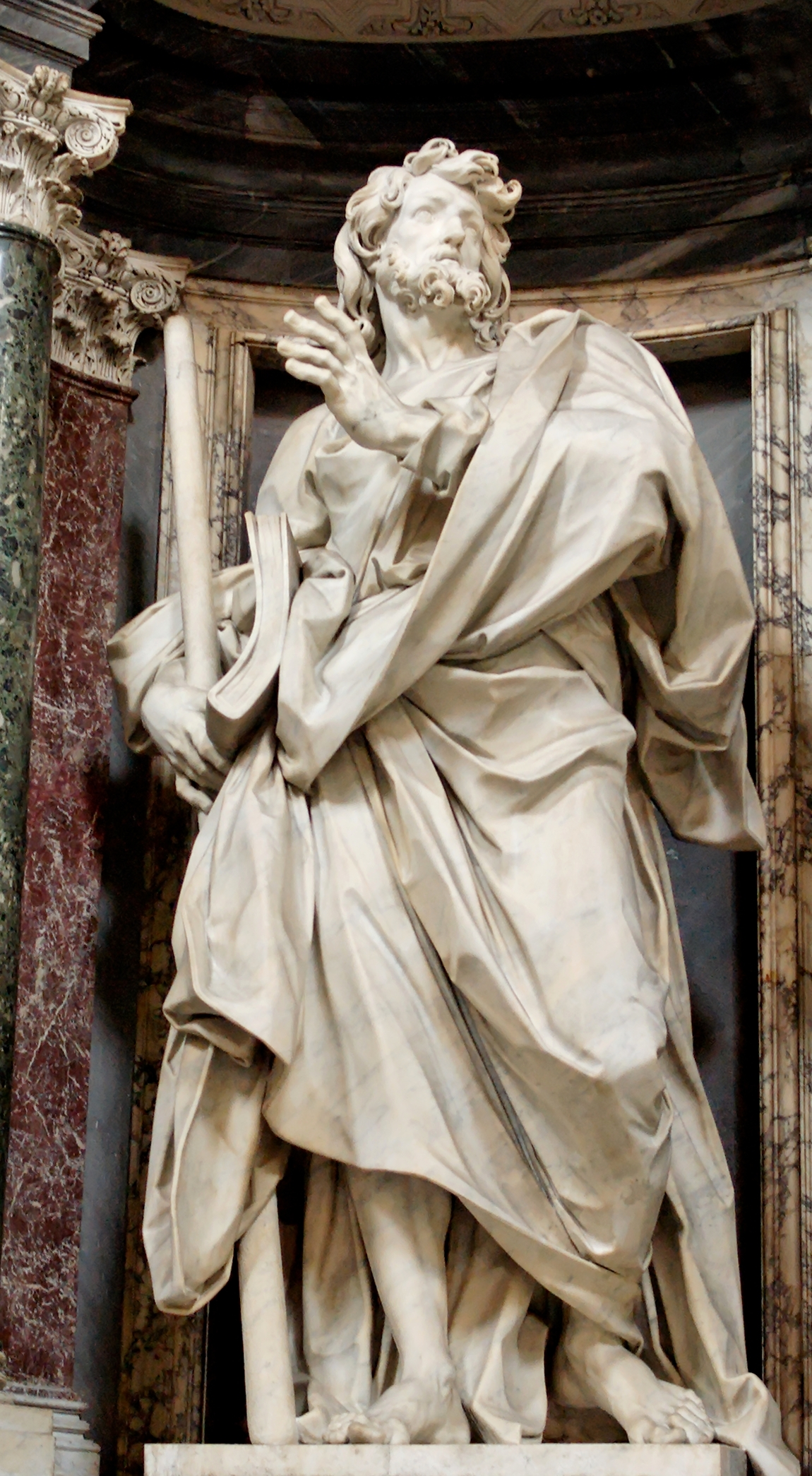
Saint James the Lesser
by de' Rossi

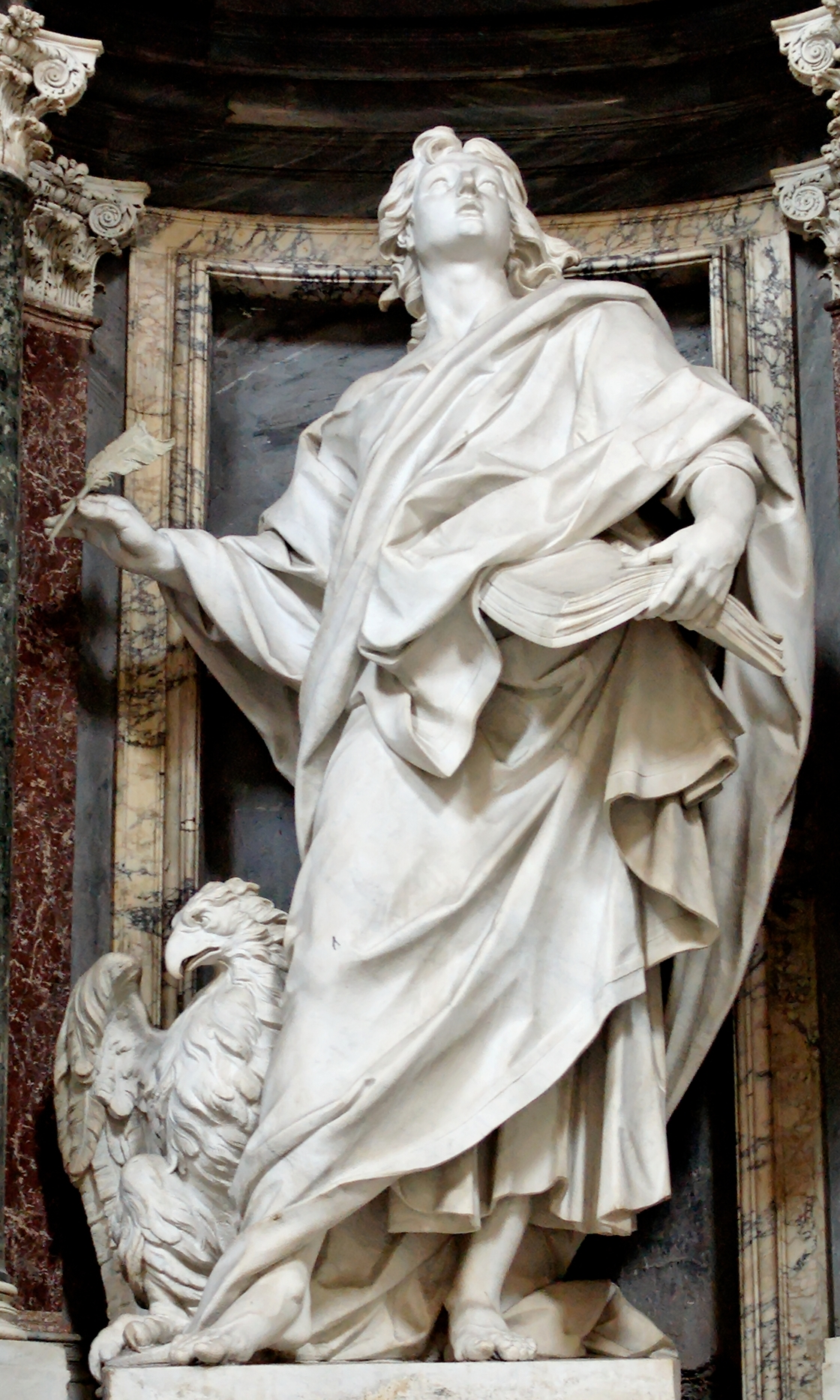
Saint John
by Rusconi

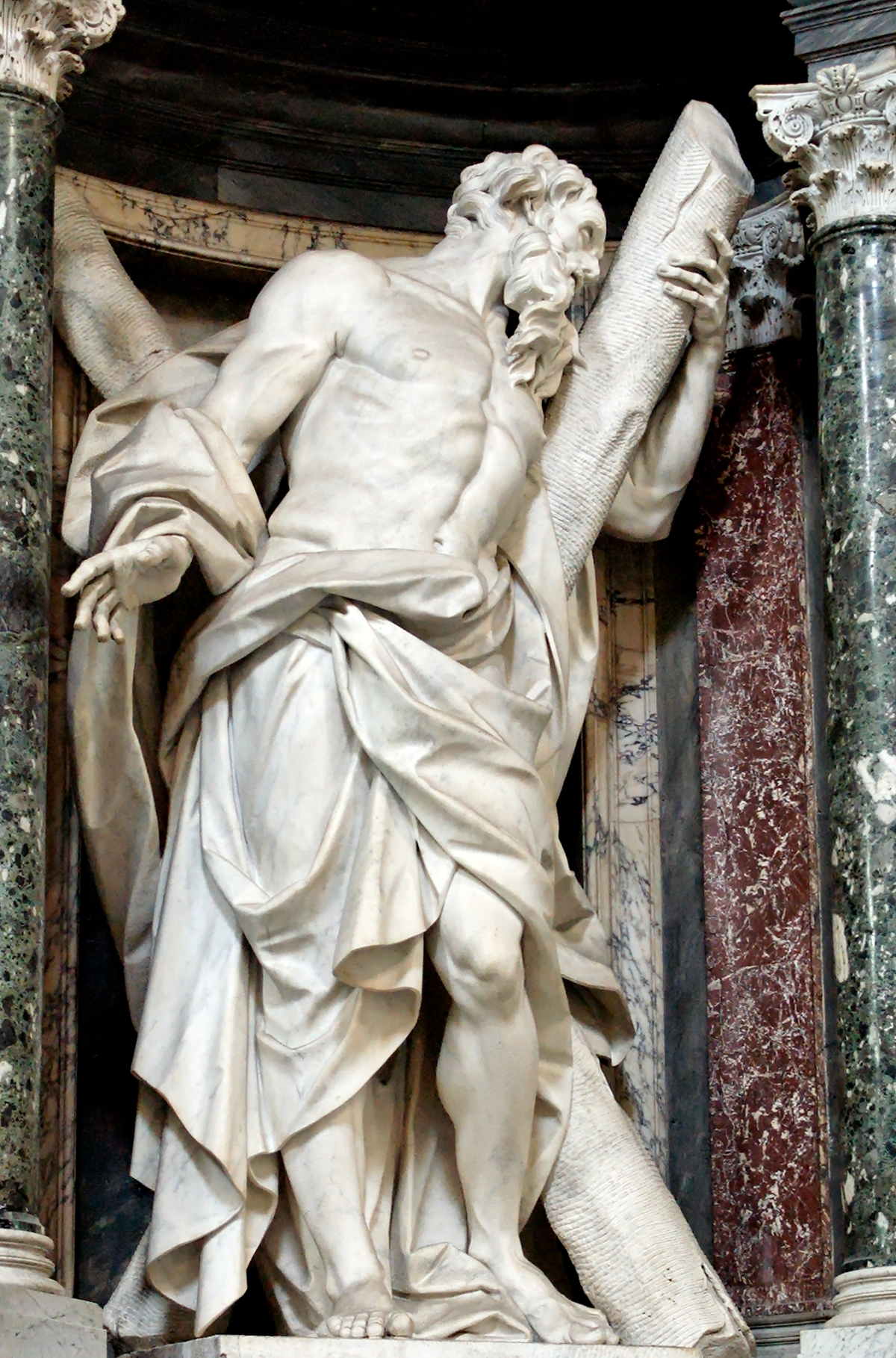
Saint Andrew
by Rusconi

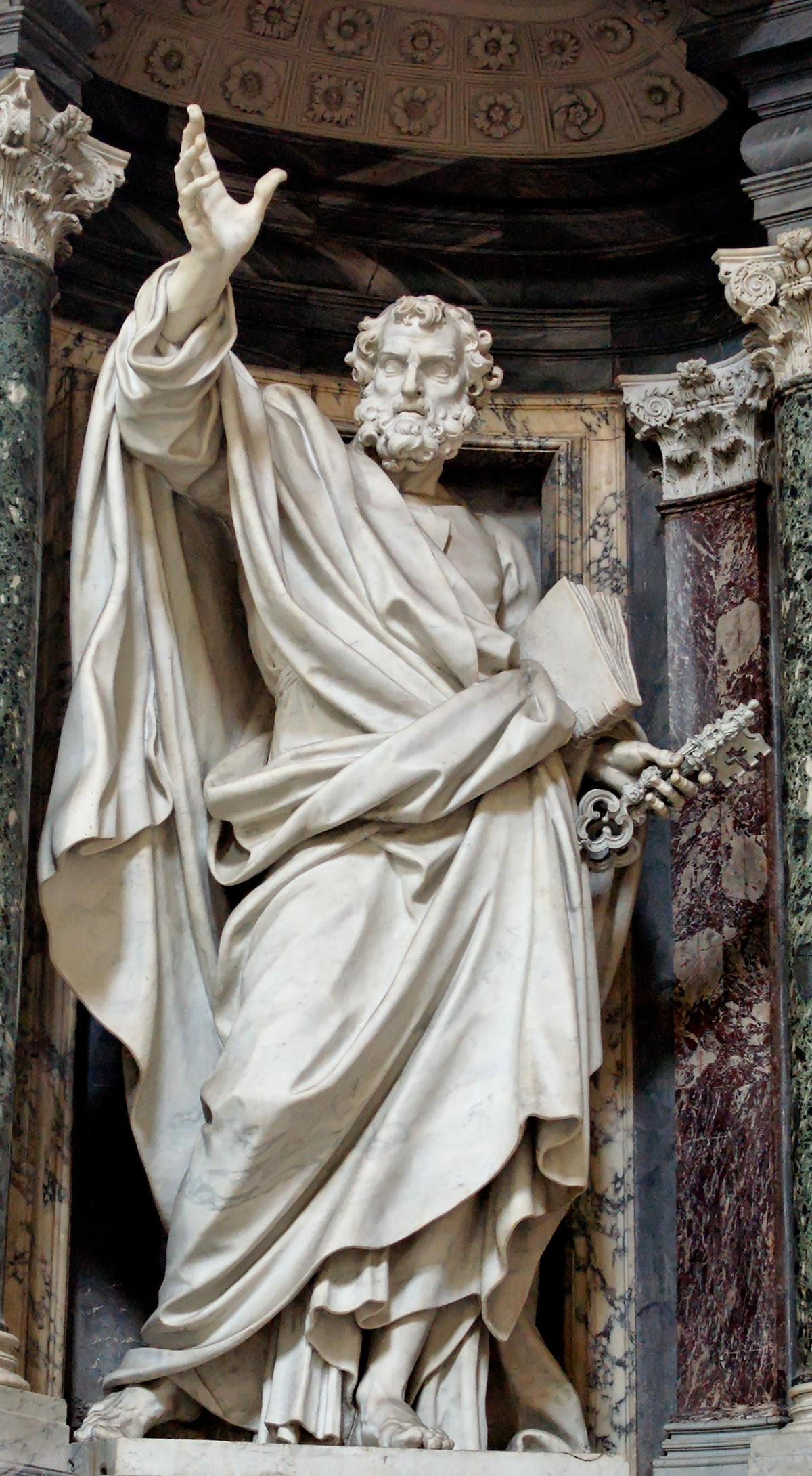
Saint Peter
by Monnot

North wall

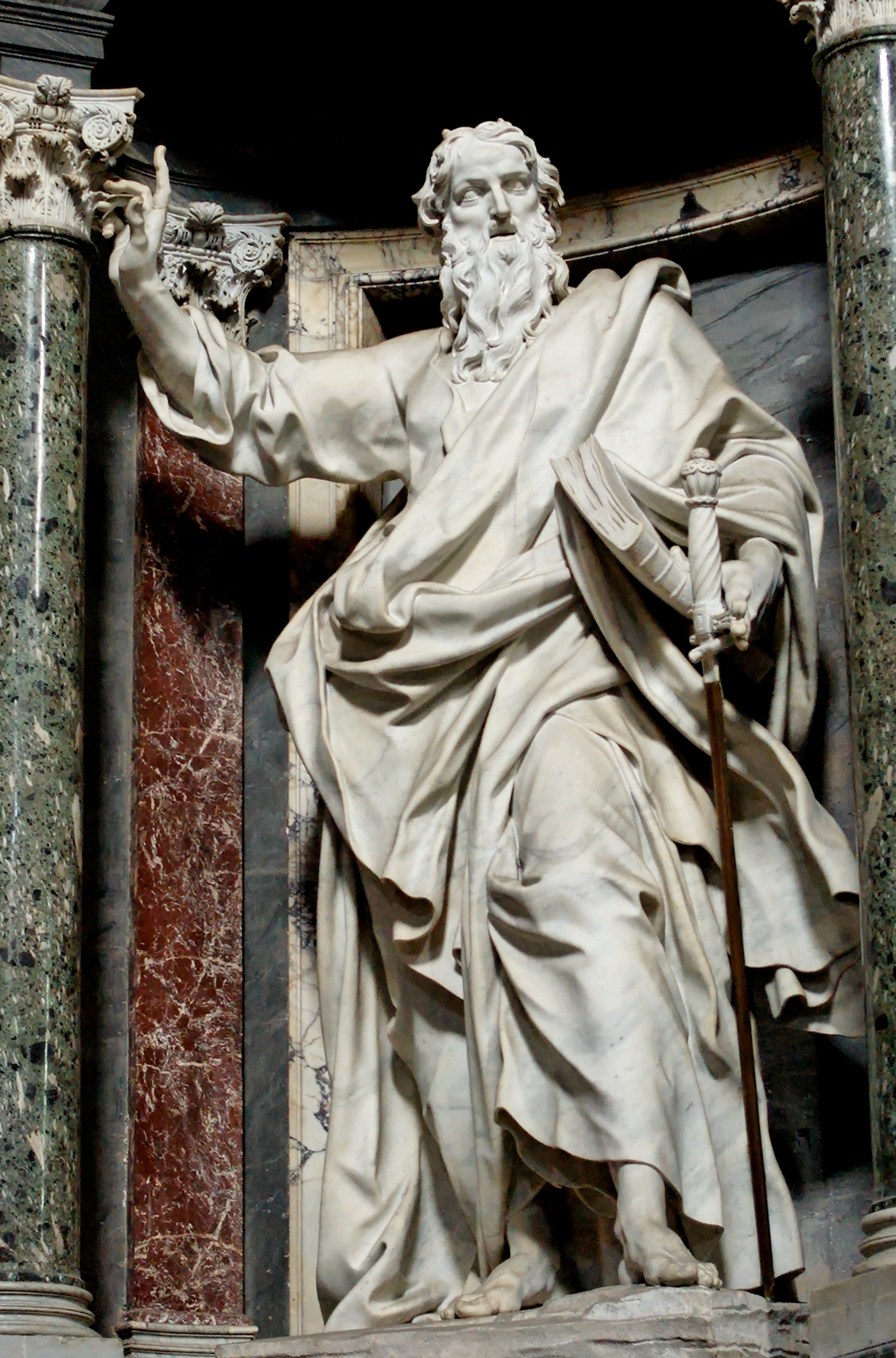
Saint Paul
by Monnot

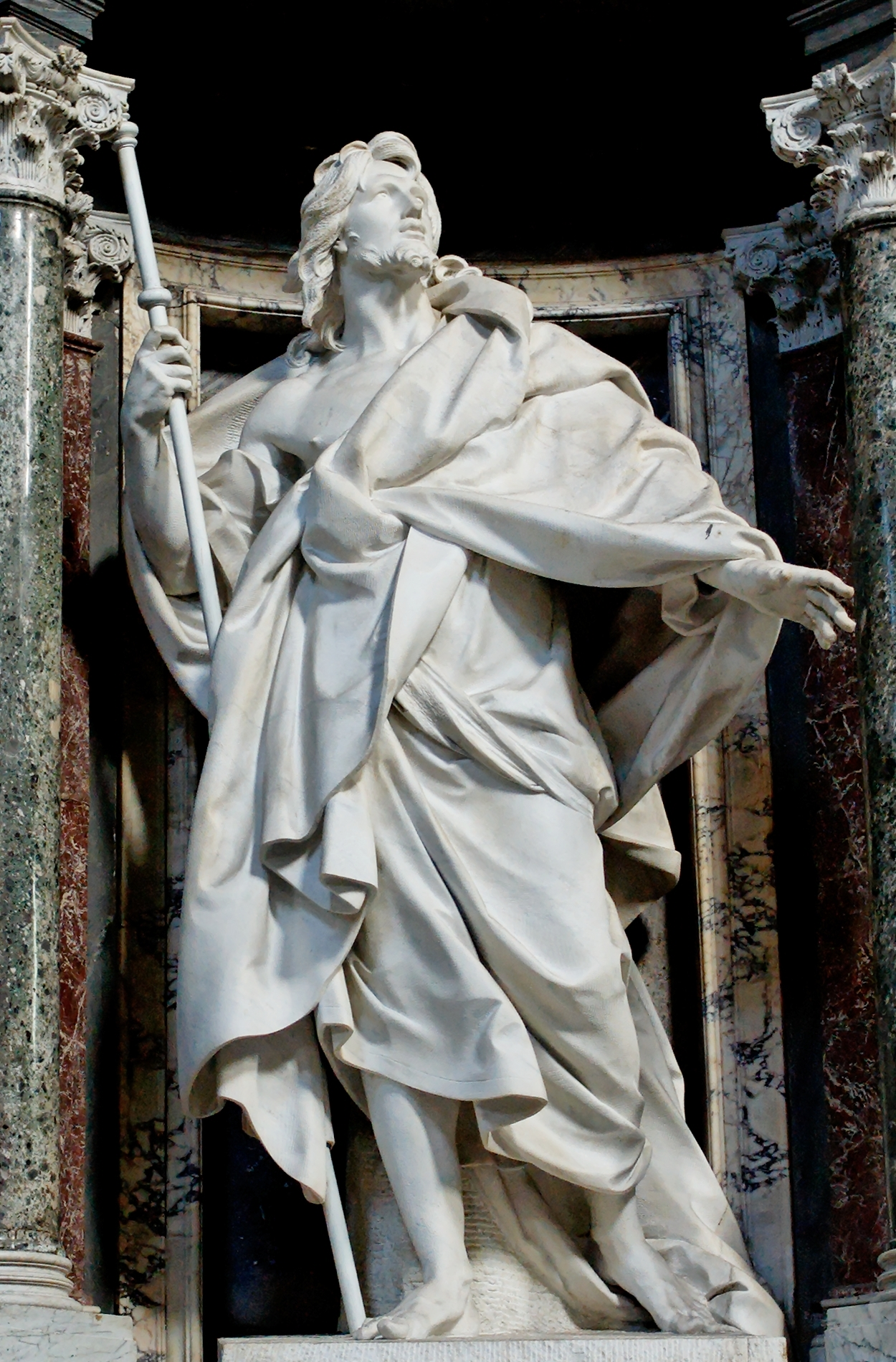
Saint James the Greater
by Rusconi

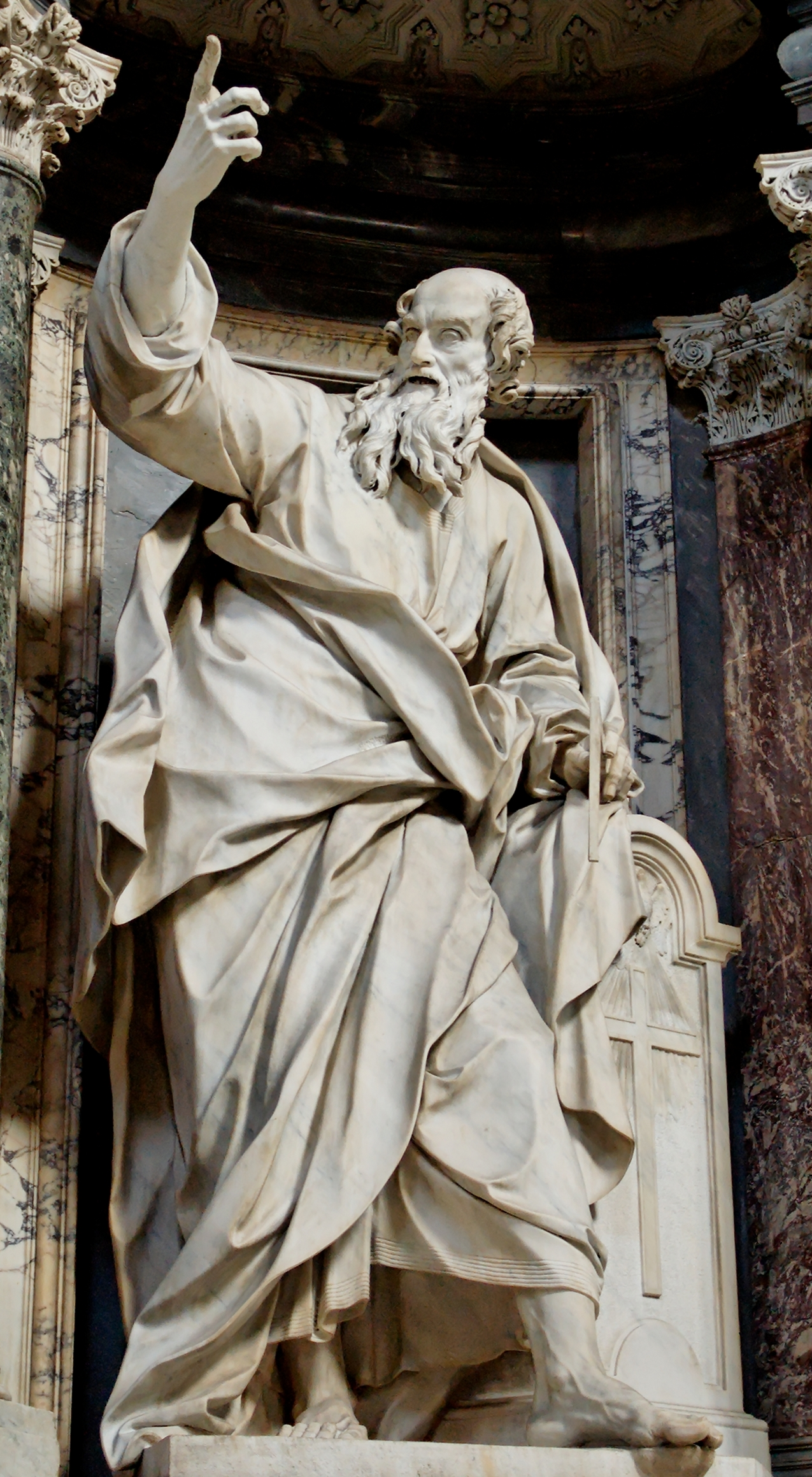
Saint Thomas
by Le Gros

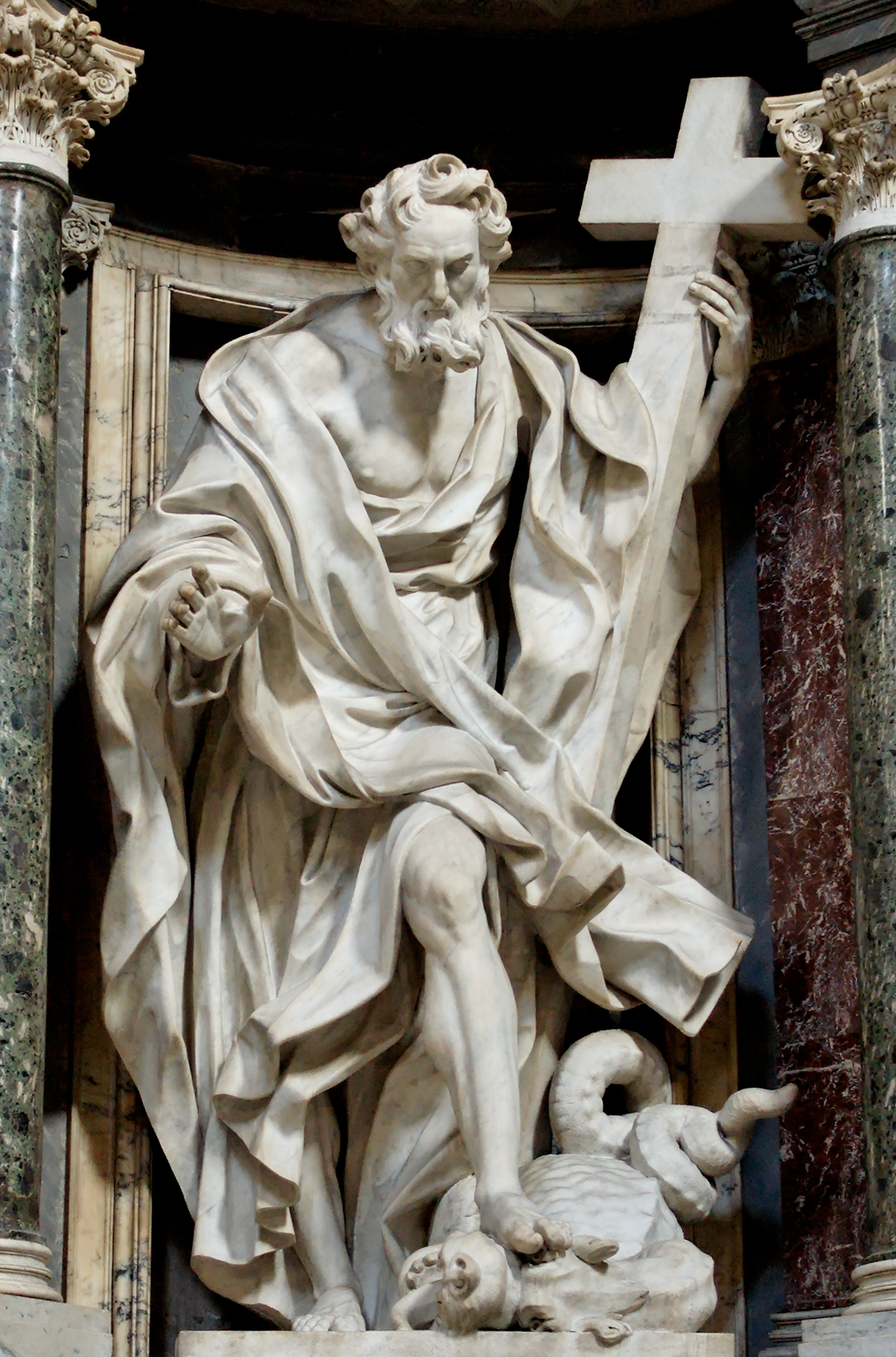
Saint Philip
by Mazzuoli

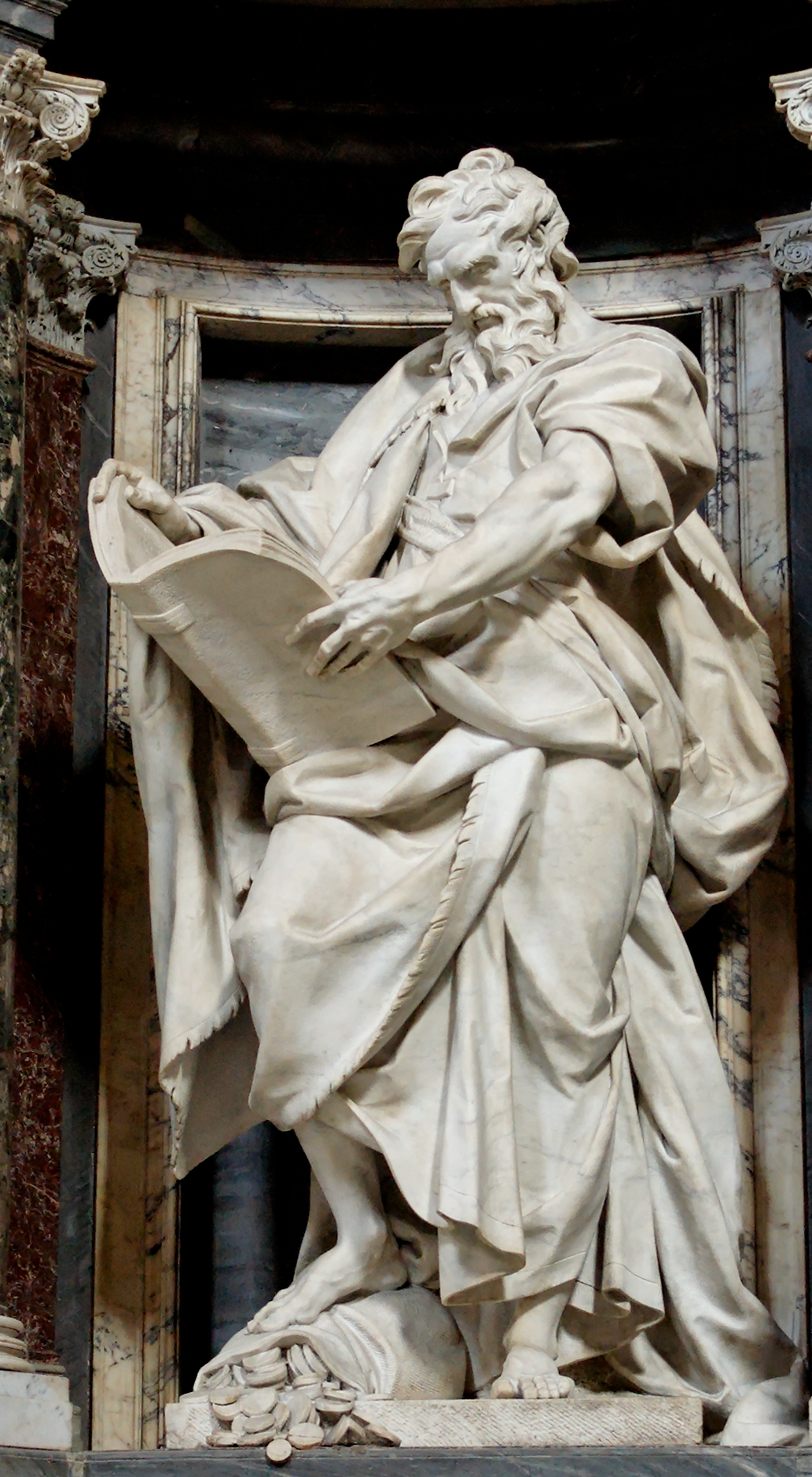
Saint Matthew
by Rusconi

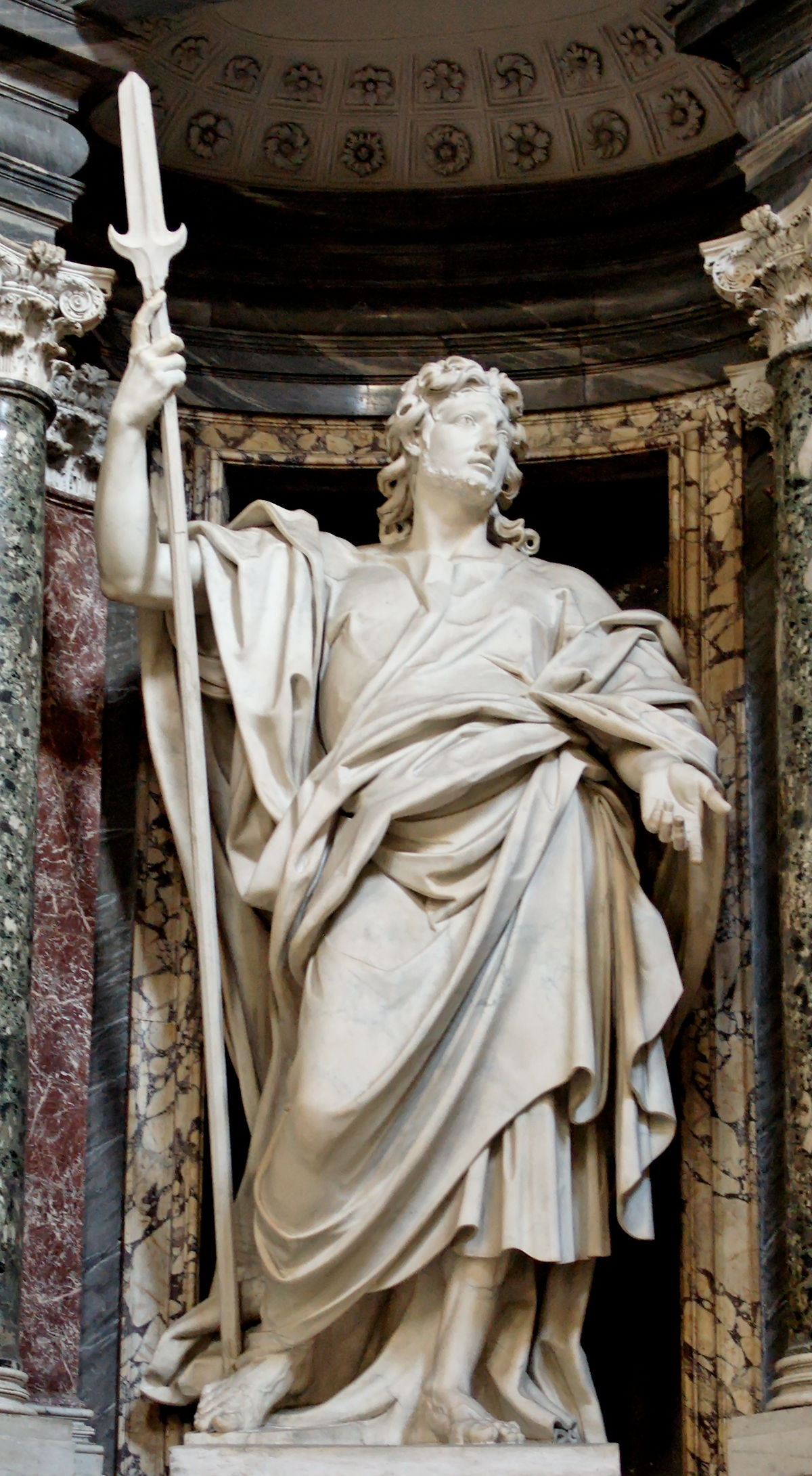
Saint Jude Thaddeaus
by Ottoni

=== Papal tombs ===
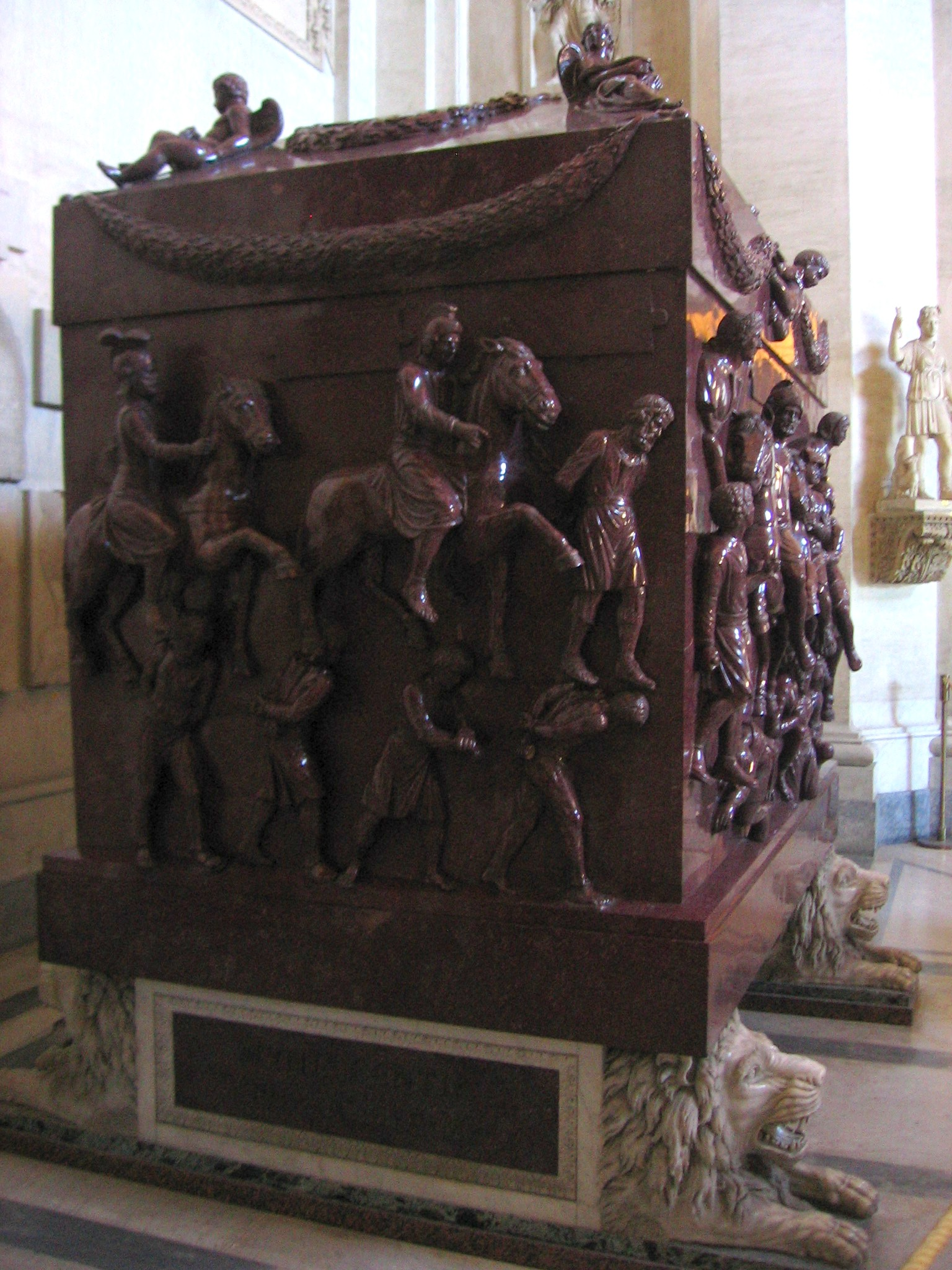
The Sarcophagus of Saint Helena, reused by Pope Anastasius IV, the only tomb to survive the Lateran fires. It is currently in the Vatican Museums.

There are six extant papal tombs inside the archbasilica: Alexander III (right aisles), Sergius IV (right aisles), Clement XII (left aisle), Martin V (in front of the confessio); Innocent III (right transept); and Leo XIII (left transept). Leo XIII (d. 1903) was the last pope not to be entombed in Saint Peter's Basilica for over a century, until the death of Pope Francis in 2025, who is buried at Santa Maria Maggiore.

Twelve additional papal tombs were constructed in the archbasilica starting in the 10th century, but were destroyed during the two fires that ravaged it in 1308 and 1361. The remains of these charred tombs were gathered and reburied in a polyandrion. The popes whose tombs were destroyed are: Pope John X (914–928), Pope Agapetus II (946–955), Pope John XII (955–964), Pope Paschal II (1099–1118), Pope Callixtus II (1119–1124), Pope Honorius II (1124–1130), Pope Celestine II (1143–1144), Pope Lucius II (1144–1145), Pope Anastasius IV (1153–1154), Pope Clement III (1187–1191), Pope Celestine III (1191–1198), and Pope Innocent V (1276). Popes who reigned during this period, whose tombs are unknown, and who may have been buried in the archbasilica include Pope John XVII (1003), Pope John XVIII (1003–1009), and Pope Alexander II (1061–1073). Pope John X was the first pope buried within the walls of Rome, and was granted a prominent burial due to rumors that he was murdered by Theodora during a historical period known as the saeculum obscurum. Cardinals Vincenzo Santucci and Carlo Colonna are also buried in the archbasilica.

The skull of Saint Peter is also claimed to reside in the archbasilica since at least the ninth century, alongside the skull of Saint Paul.

=== Baptistery and Holy Stairs ===
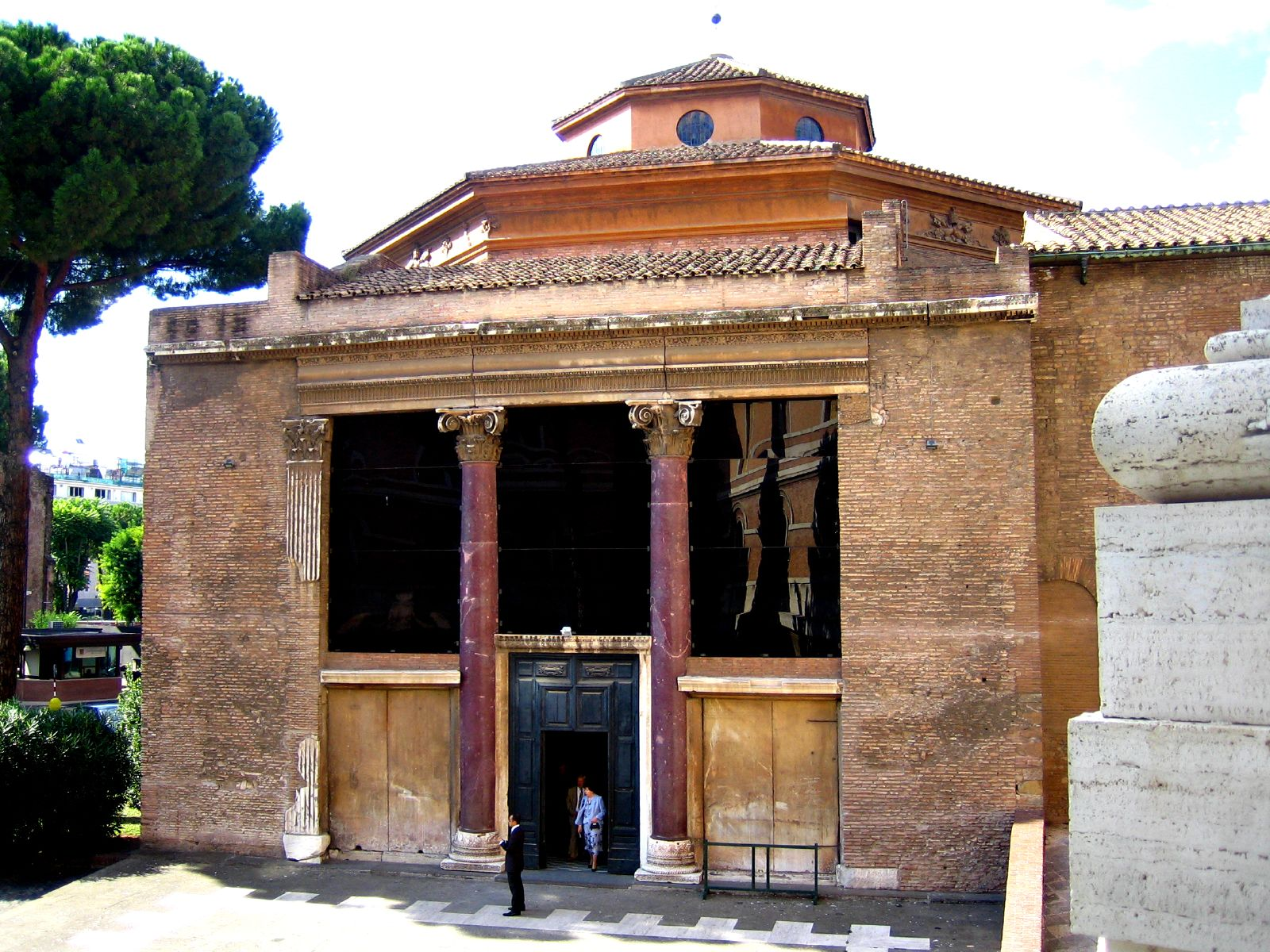
The entrance to the Lateran Baptistery, adjacent to the Archbasilica

The octagonal Lateran baptistery stands somewhat apart from the archbasilica. It was founded by Pope Sixtus III, perhaps on an earlier structure, for a legend arose that Emperor Constantine I was baptized there and enriched the edifice. The baptistery was for many generations the only baptistery in Rome, and its octagonal structure, centered upon the large basin for full immersions, provided a model for others throughout Italy, and even an iconic motif of illuminated manuscripts known as "the fountain of life".

The Scala Sancta, or Holy Stairs, are white marble steps encased in wooden ones. They supposedly form the staircase which once led to the praetorium of Pontius Pilate in Jerusalem and which, therefore, were sanctified by the footsteps of Jesus Christ during His Passion. The marble stairs are visible through openings in the wooden risers. Their translation from Jerusalem to the Lateran Palace in the 4th century is credited to Saint Empress Helena, the mother of the then-Emperor Constantine I. In 1589, Pope Sixtus V relocated the steps to their present location in front of the ancient palatine chapel named the Sancta Sanctorum. Ferraù Fenzoni completed some of the frescoes on the walls.

== Tabula Magna Lateranensis ==
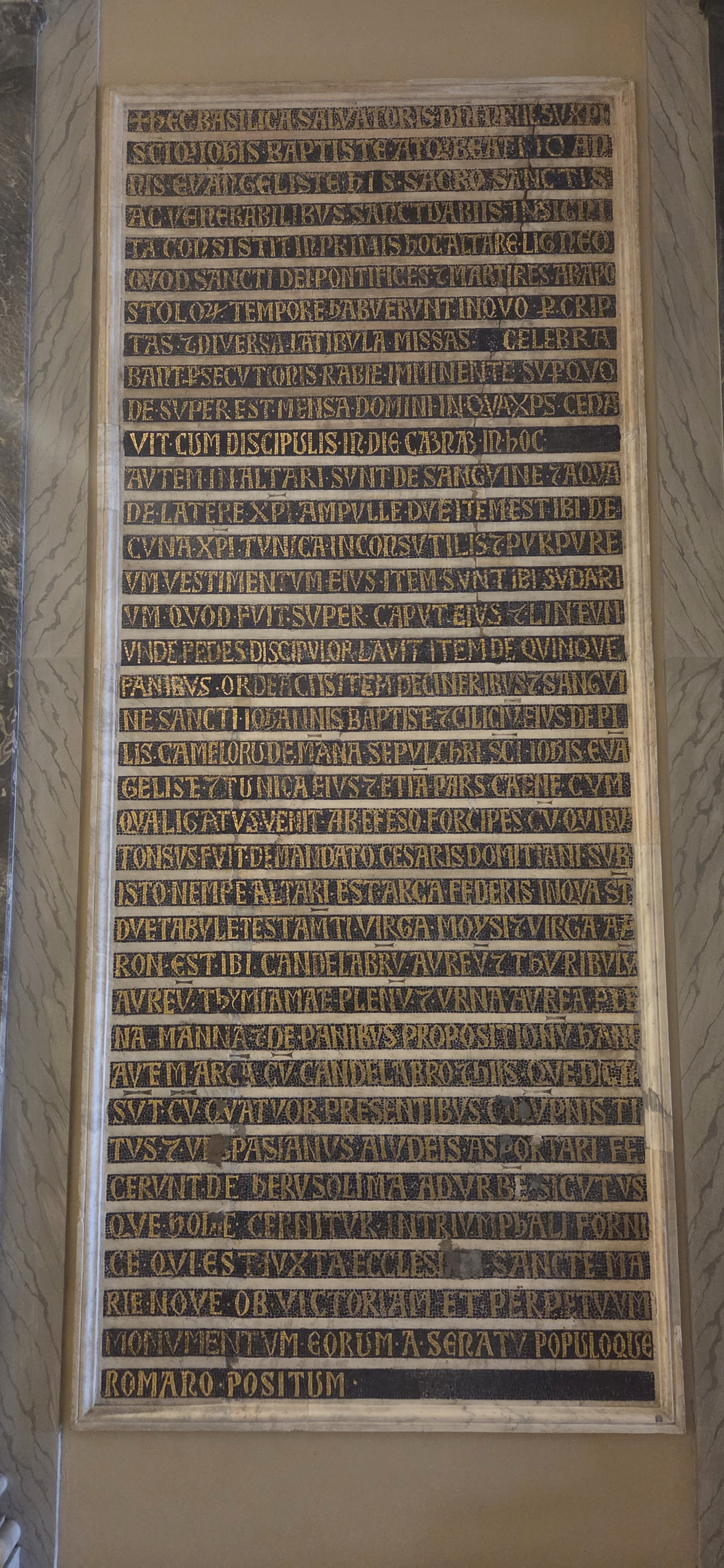
Tabula Magna Lateranensis (13th century), located on the left side of the sacristy door, in which are listed the main relics preserved in the basilica

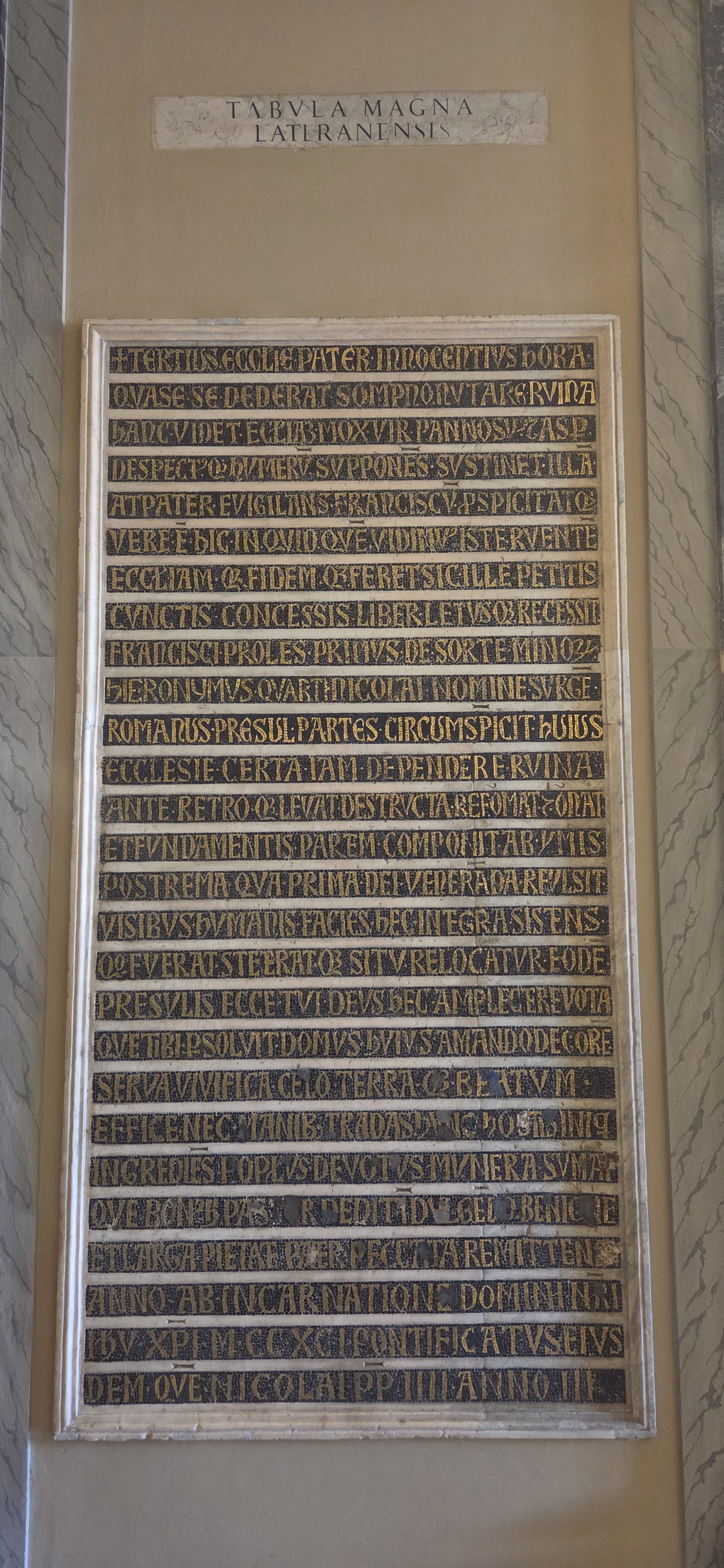
Thirteenth-century panel similar to the Tabula Magna Lateranensis (the title at the top, added in the nineteenth century, is misleading), located on the right side of the sacristy door, describing some works done in the ninth century

== Notable people ==
=== Archpriests ===
Pope Boniface VIII instituted the office of Archpriest of the Archbasilica circa 1299.

List of Archpriests of the Archbasilica:

- Gerardo Bianchi (c. 1299–1302)
- Pietro Valeriano Duraguerra (1302)
- Matteo Rosso Orsini (1302–1305)
- Pietro Colonna (1306–1326)
- Bertrand de Montfavez (1326–1342)
- Giovanni Colonna (1342–1348)
- Pierre Roger de Beaufort (1348–1370)
- Ange de Grimoard (1371–1388)
- Pietro Tomacelli (1388?–1389)
- Francesco Carbone (1389–1405)
- Antonio Caetani (seniore) (1405–1412)
- Oddone Colonna (1412–1417)
- Alamanno Adimari (1418–1422)
- Guillaume Fillastre (1422–1428)
- Alfonso Carillo de Albornoz (1428–1434)
- Lucido Conti (1434–1437)
- Angelotto Fosco (1437–1444)
- António Martinez de Chaves (1444 – 6 July 1447)
- Domenico Capranica (1447–1458)
- Prospero Colonna (1458–1463)
- Latino Orsini (1463–1477)
- Giuliano della Rovere (1477–1503)
- Giovanni Colonna (1503–1538)
- Alessandro Farnese (1508–1534)
- Giovanni Domenico de Cupis (1534–1553)
- Ranuccio Farnese (1553–1565)
- Mark Sitticus von Hohenems (1565–1588)
- Ascanio Colonna (1588–1608)
- Scipione Caffarelli-Borghese (1608–1620)
- Giambattista Leni (1620–1627)
- Francesco Barberini (1627–1629)
- Girolamo Colonna (1629–1666)
- Flavio Chigi (1666–1693)
- Paluzzo Paluzzi Altieri degli Albertoni (1693–1698)
- Benedetto Pamphili (1699–1730)
- Pietro Ottoboni (1730–1740)
- Neri Maria Corsini (1740–1770)
- Mario Marefoschi Compagnoni (1771–1780)
- Carlo Rezzonico (1781–1799)
- Francesco Saverio de Zelada (1800–1801)
- Leonardo Antonelli (1801–1811)
- Bartolomeo Pacca (1830–1844)
- Benedetto Barberini (28 April 1844 – 10 April 1863)
- Lodovico Altieri (1863–1867)
- Costantino Patrizi Naro (1867–1876)
- Flavio Chigi (24 December 1876 – 1885)
- Raffaele Monaco La Valletta (1885–1896)
- Francesco Satolli (16 December 1896 – 8 January 1910)
- Pietro Respighi (10 January 1910 – 22 March 1913)
- Domenico Ferrata (7 April 1913 – 10 October 1914)
- Basilio Pompili (28 October 1914 – 5 May 1931)
- Francesco Marchetti-Selvaggiani (26 May 1931 – 13 January 1951)
- Benedetto Aloisi Masella (27 October 1954 – 30 August 1970)
- Angelo Dell'Acqua (7 November 1970 – 27 August 1972)
- Ugo Poletti (26 March 1973 – 17 January 1991)
- Camillo Ruini (1 July 1991 – 27 June 2008)
- Agostino Vallini (27 June 2008 – 26 May 2017)
- Angelo De Donatis (26 May 2017 – 6 April 2024)
- Baldassare Reina (6 October 2024 – present)

=== Others ===
- Giuseppe Olivieri, Italian composer who was maestro di cappella at the archbasilica in 1622–1623.

== Gallery ==
Front entrance and bronze door

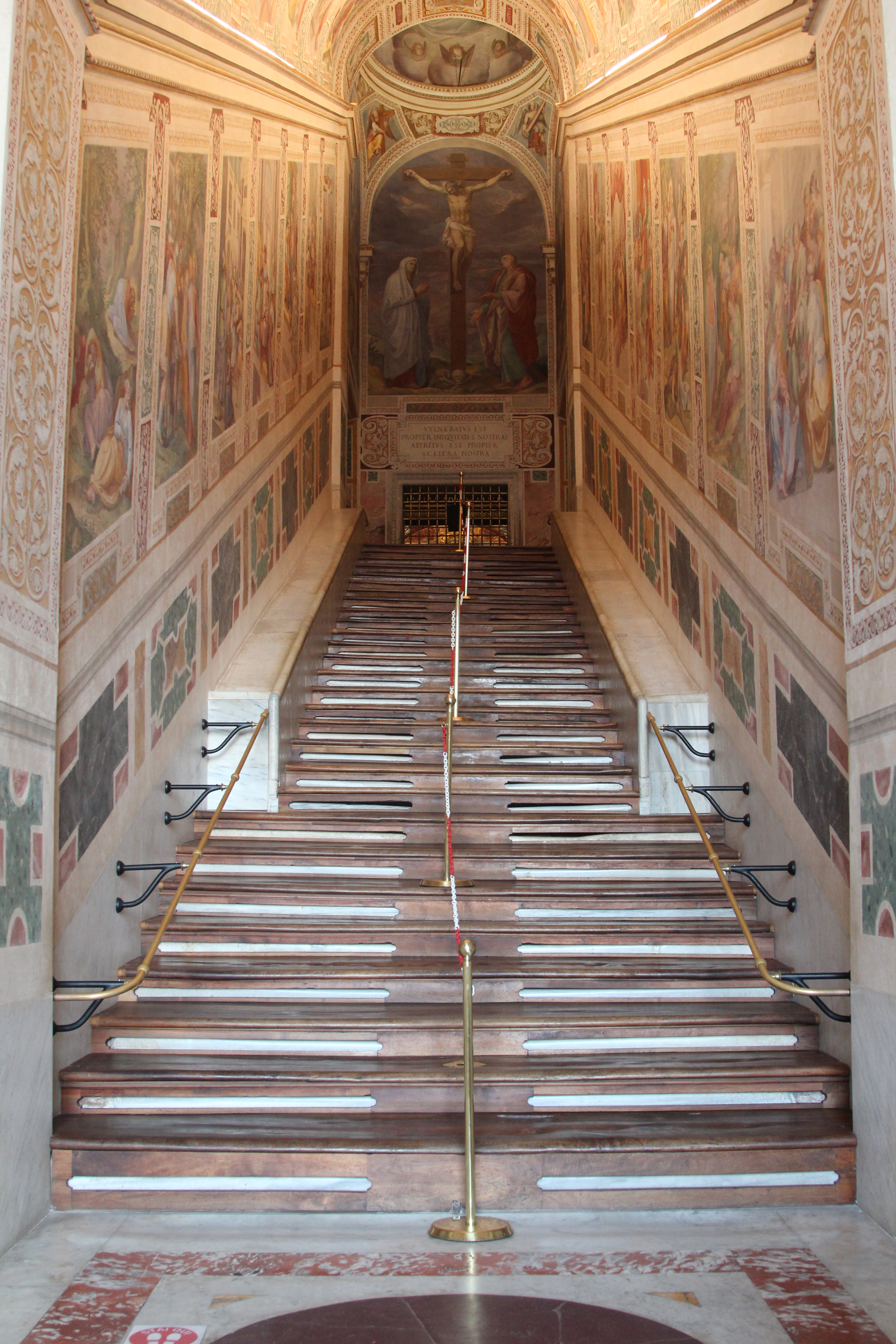
The Scala Sancta

Alessandro Galilei completed the late Baroque façade of the archbasilica in 1735 after winning a competition for the design.

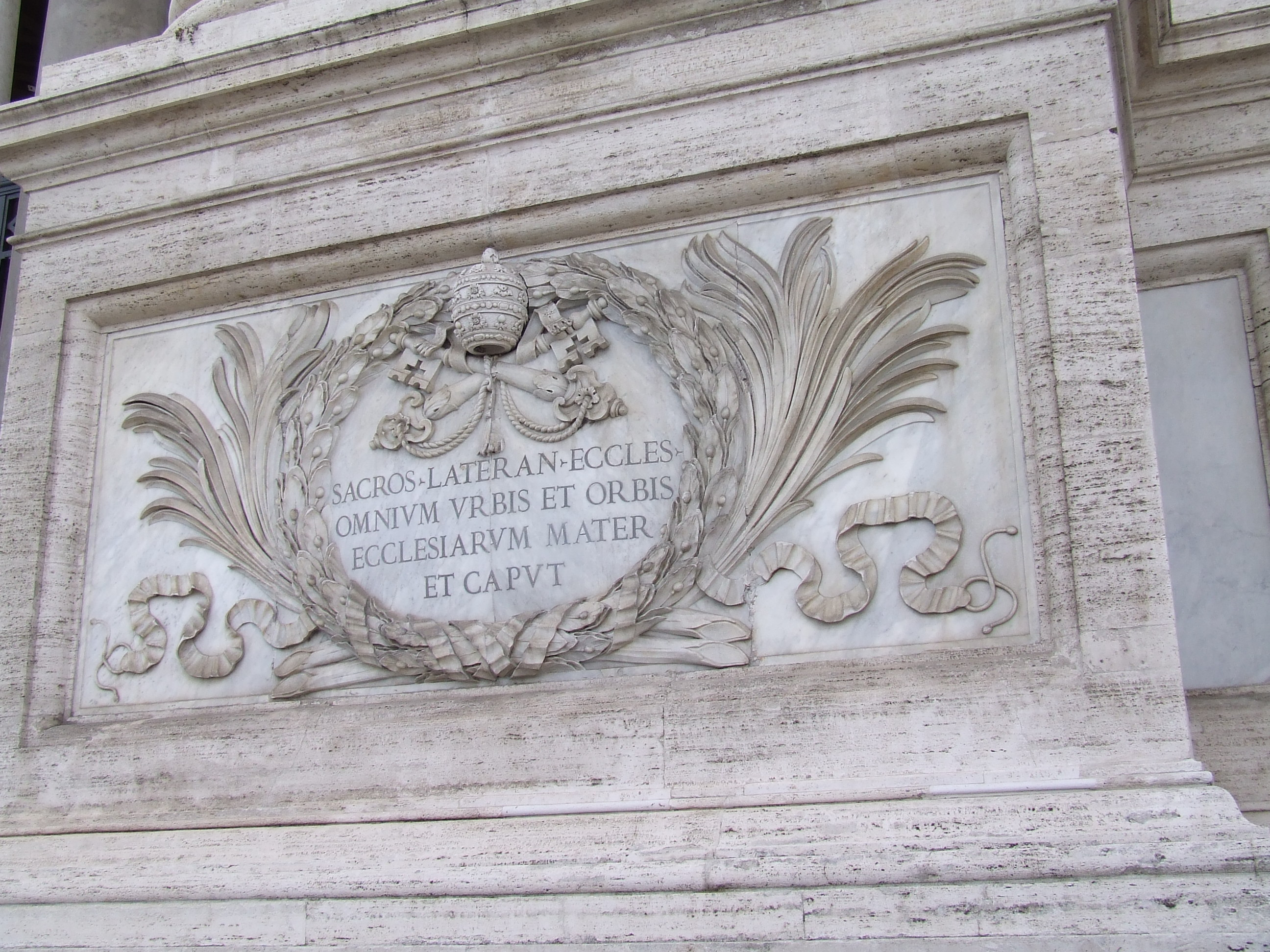
Next to the main entrance is the inscription of the archbasilica's declaration to being the mother church of the world.

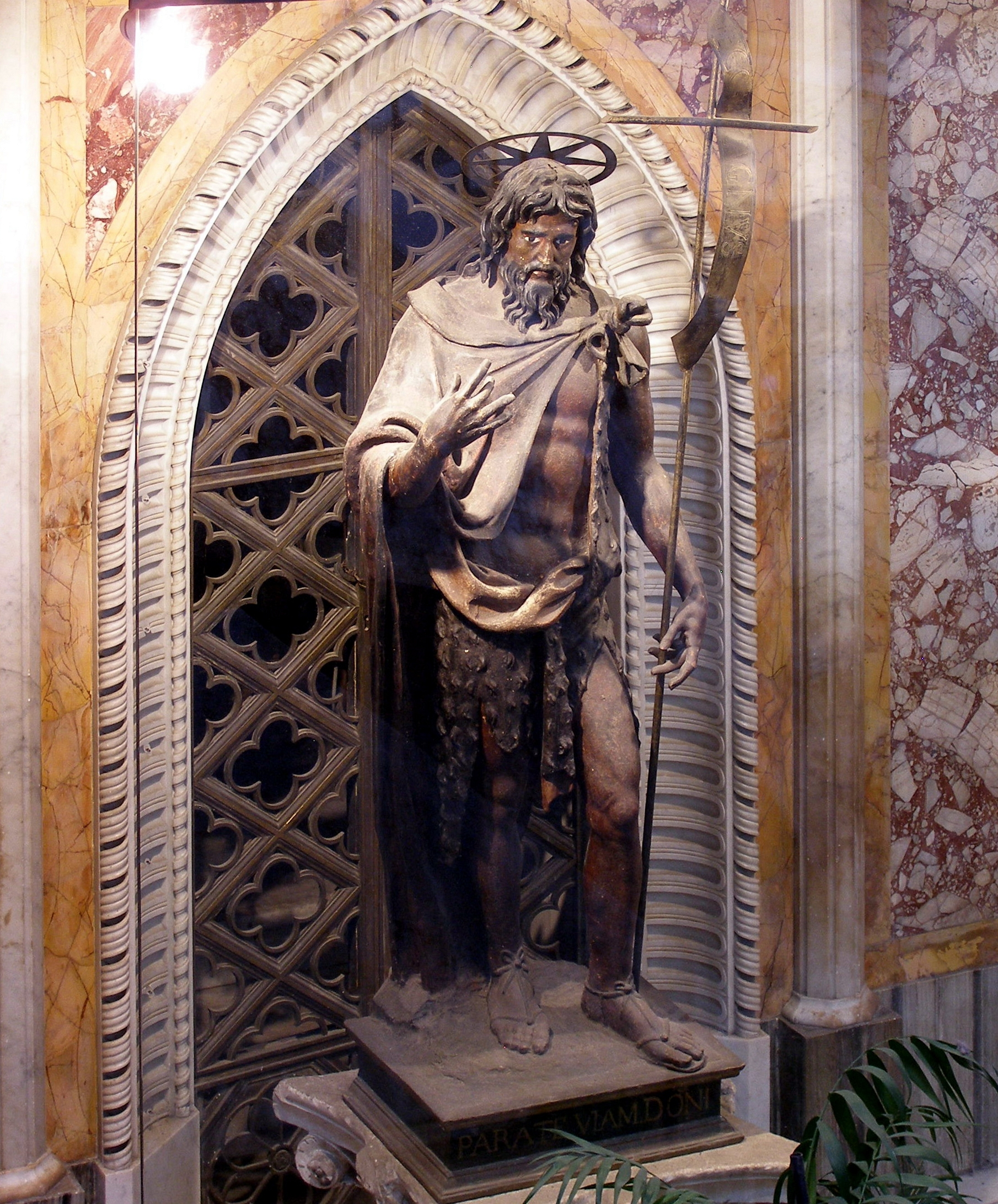
Statue of Saint John the Baptist

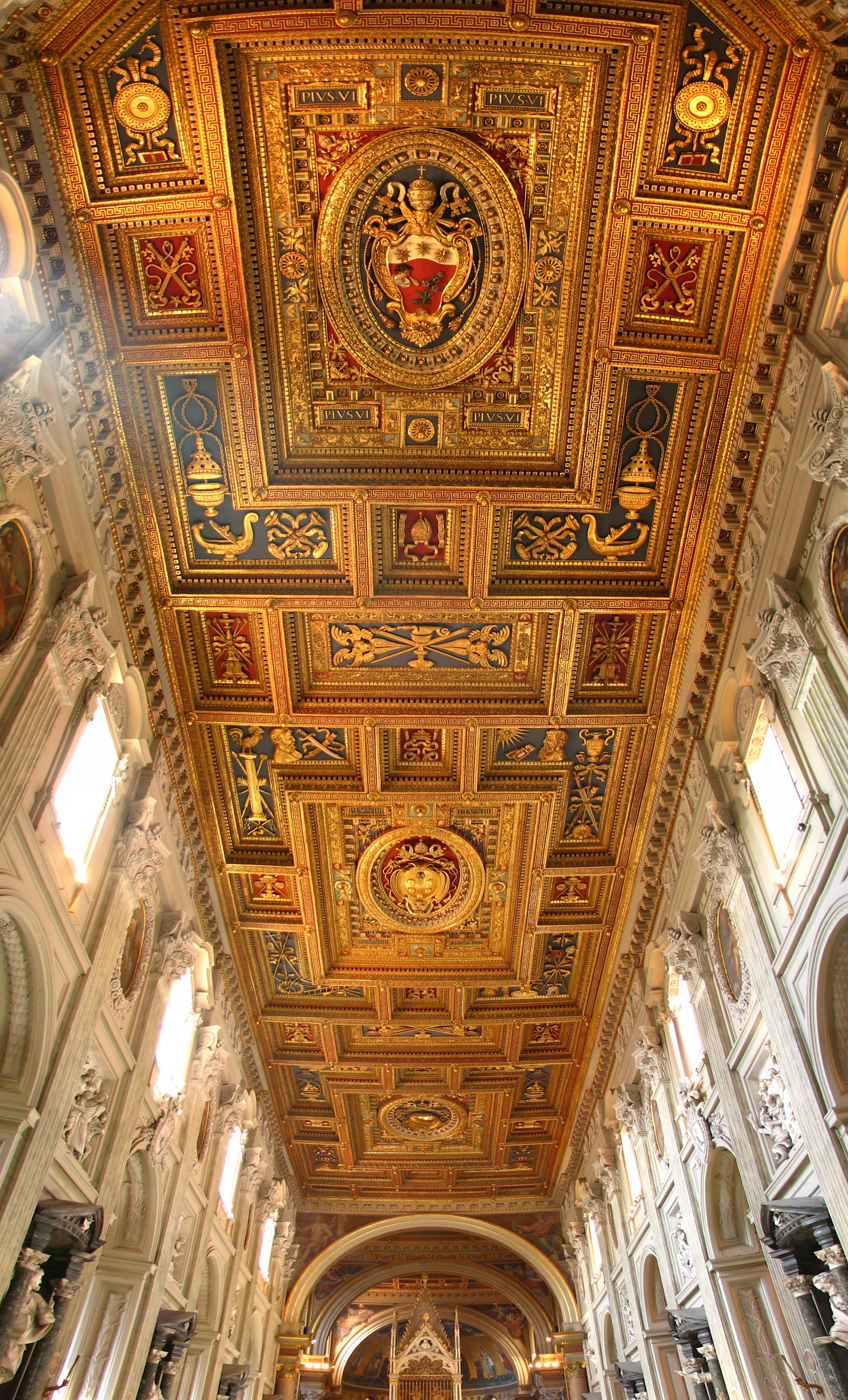
The decorated ceiling

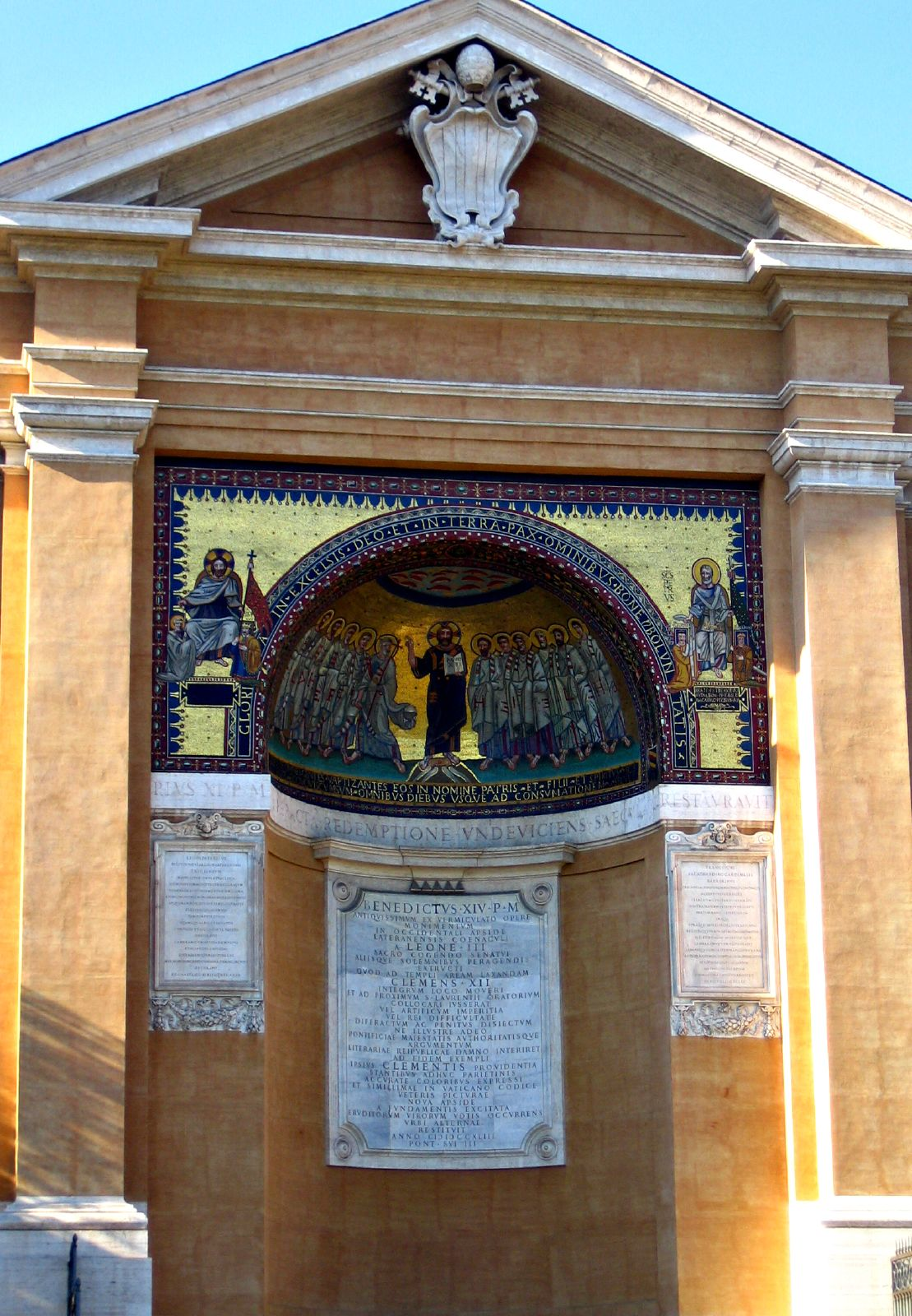
Apse depicting mosaics from the Triclinium of Pope Leo III in the ancient Lateran Palace

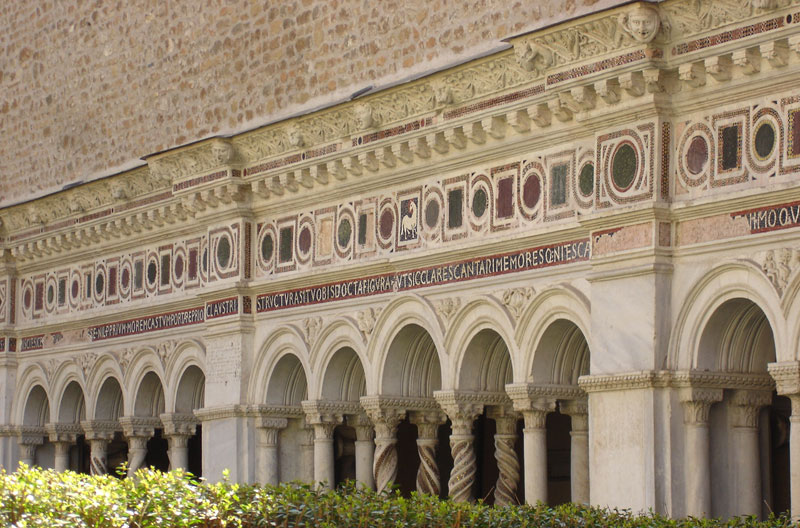
The cloister of the attached monastery, with a cosmatesque decoration

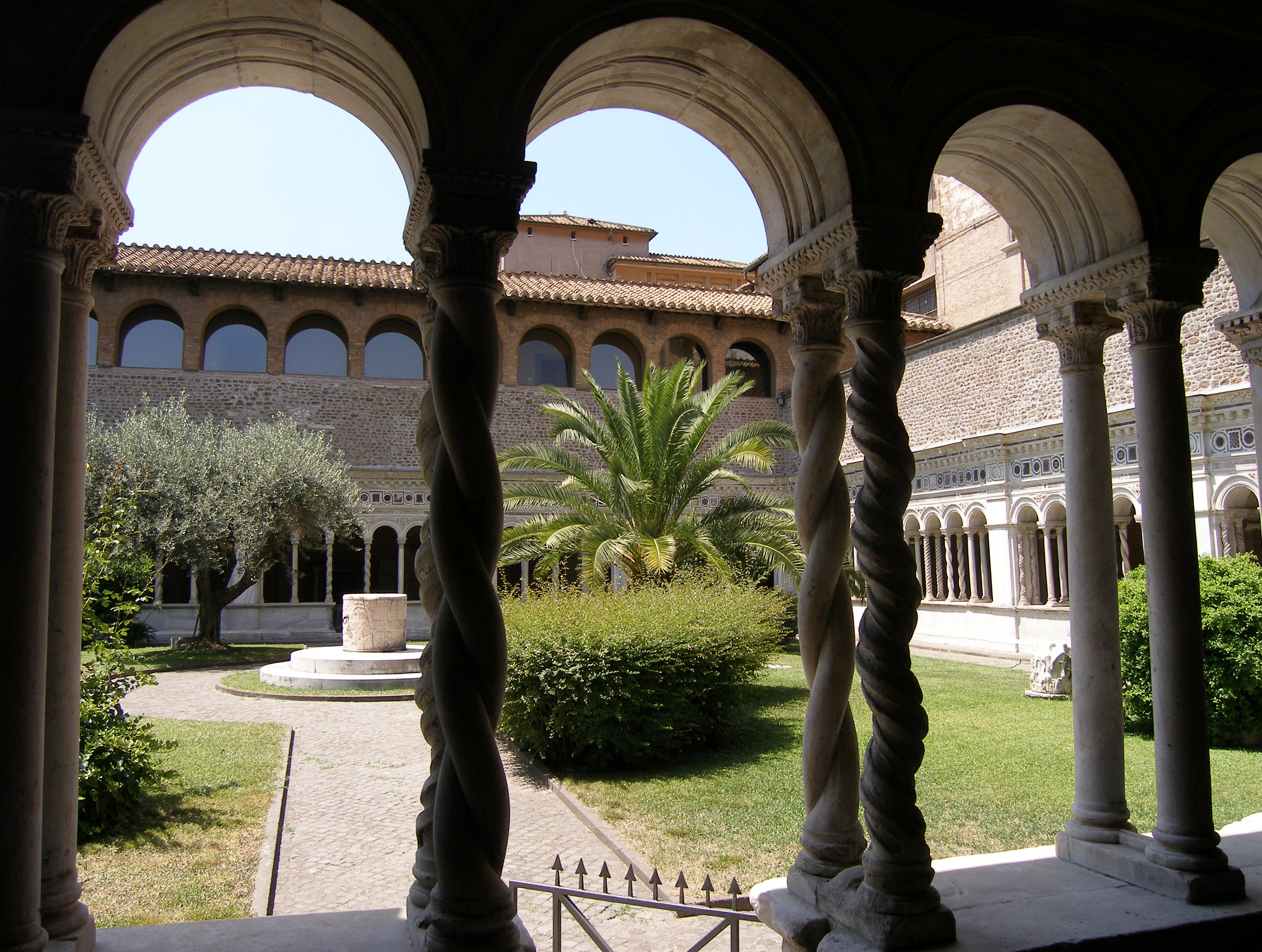
The cloister of the attached monastery

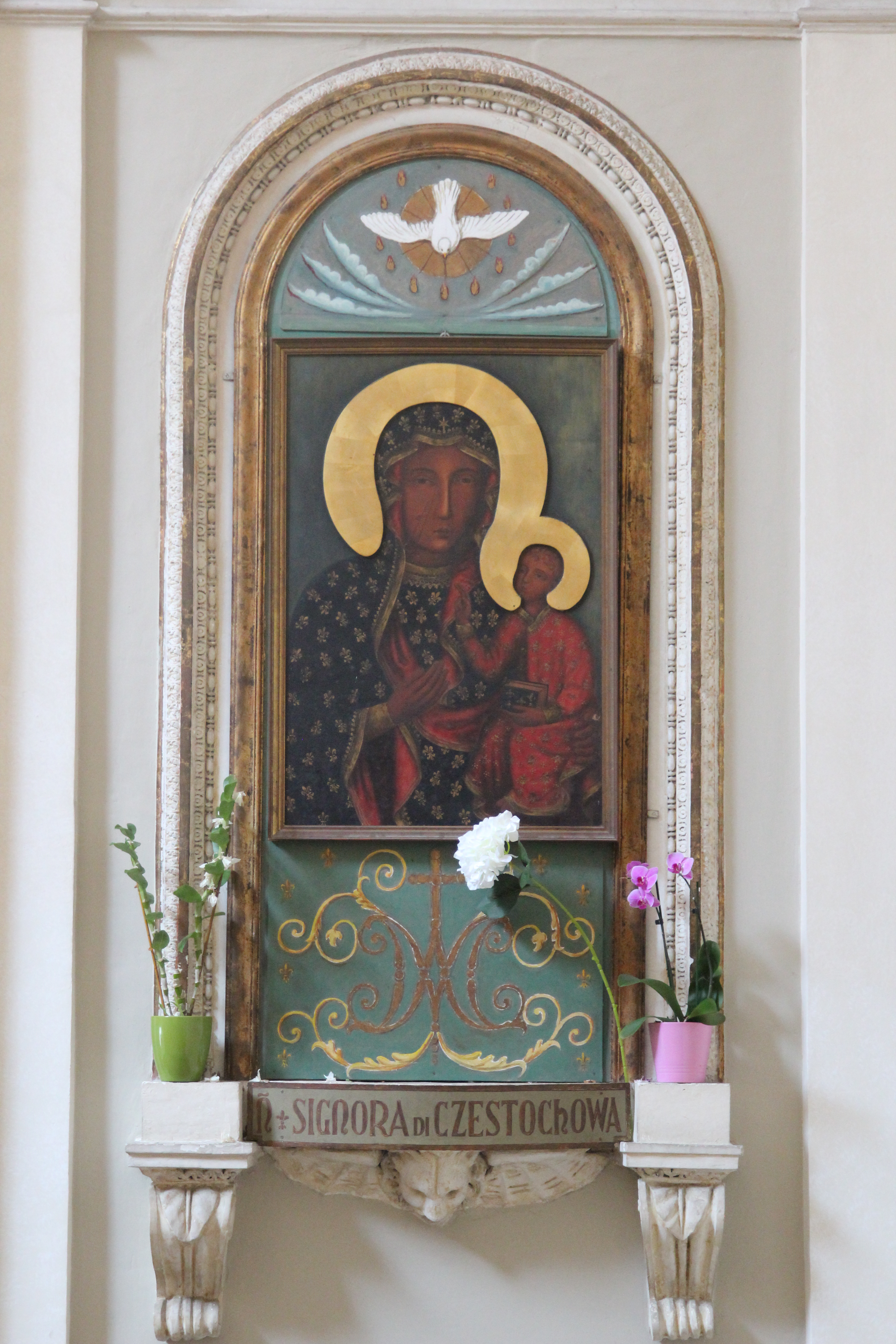
Our Lady of Częstochowa depicted in the archbasilica

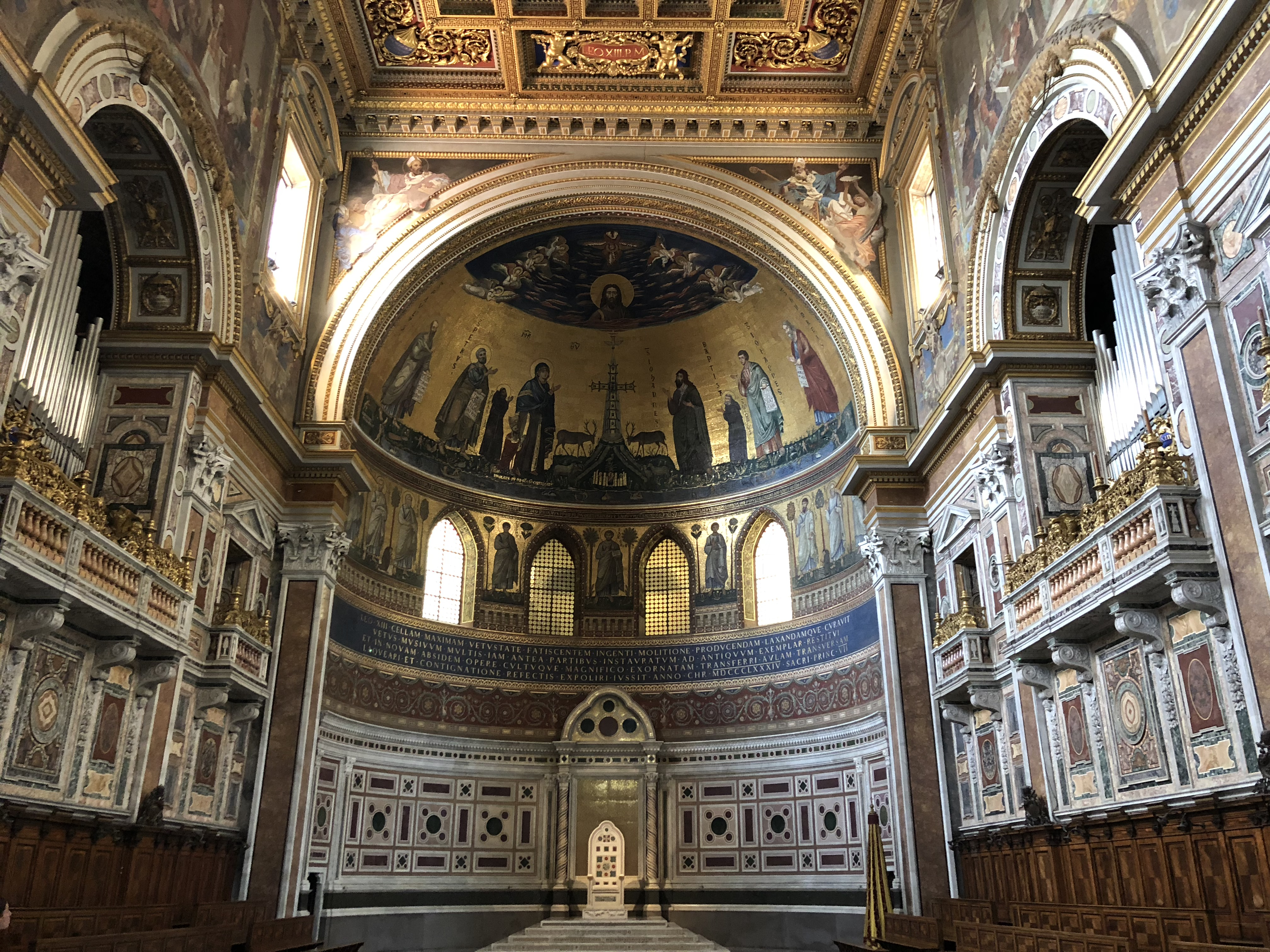
Interior picture of the Apse in the Archbasilica of Saint John Lateran containing the Papal cathedra

== See also ==
- Early Christian art and architecture
- Colegio de San Juan de Letran, a Philippine school named after the archbasilica
- Index of Vatican City-related articles
- Schola Castra Nova Equitum Singularium

Preceded by Ponte Sant'Angelo	Landmarks of Rome; Archbasilica of Saint John Lateran	Succeeded by Santa Maria Maggiore
