= Mirocles =

Bishop of Milan from before 313 to c. 316

- Bishop of Milan
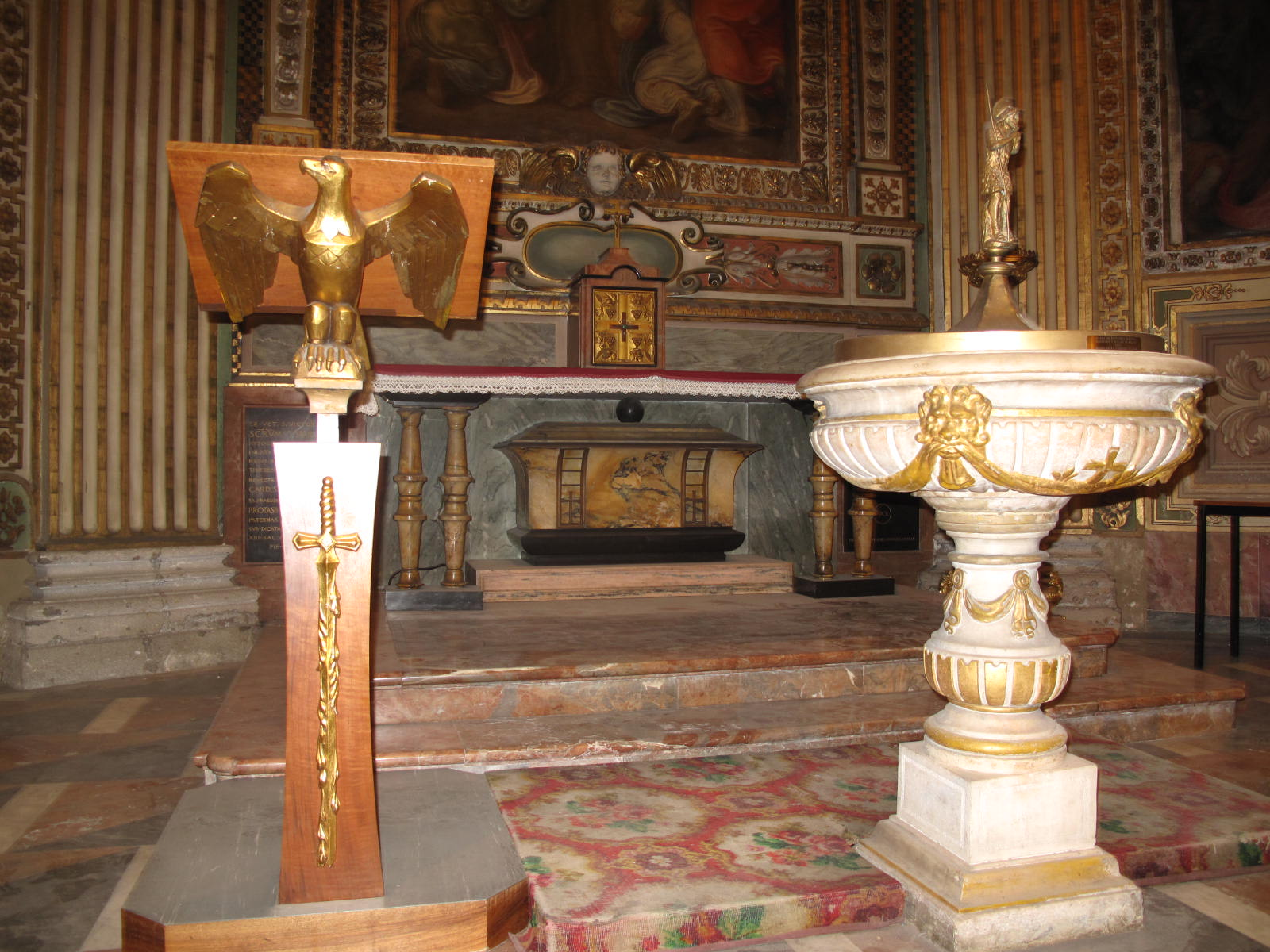
- Altar and Urn of Saint Mirocles
- Church: Catholic Church
- Appointed: before 313 AD
- Term ended: c. 316
- Predecessor: Monas
- Successor: Maternus

Personal details
- Born: c. 3rd century AD
- Died: 30 November c. 316 AD Milan, Roman Italy, Roman Empire

Sainthood
- Feast day: 3 December
- Venerated in: Catholic Church

Mirocles (or Merocles, Italian: Mirocle, born c. 3rd century AD - died c. 316 AD) was Bishop of Milan from before 313 to c. 316. He is honoured as a Saint in the Catholic Church and his feast day is on December 3.

== Life ==
Almost nothing is known about the life of Mirocles. He was elected as bishop of Milan in some year before 313 and he reigned till about 316. He perhaps was born to a family of Pavia, to which will born also Epiphanius.

Mirocles was the bishop of Milan when in 313 the Emperors Constantine I and Licinius issued the Edict of Milan which proclaimed the religious toleration in the Roman Empire. After the Edict of Milan, Mirocles started the erection of the basilica vetus, which was the first cathedral of the town and that was placed on the area nowadays occupied by the present Cathedral of Milan.

Sources record the presence of Mirocles to the Lateran council held in October 313 in Rome, under Pope Miltiades, which took a stand in the Donatism issue, condemning Donatus Magnus charged to re-baptizing clergy who had lapsed and which sided with Caecilianus bishop of Carthage. Mirocles participated also in the following council of all the Western bishops held in Arles on 1 August 314, which confirmed the condemnation of Donatus and ruled about canon law.

Mirocles possibly founded also the church of San Vittore al Corpo in Milan (rebuilt many times during the next centuries) in honor of saint Victor Maurus, who was martyred during the reign of Emperor Diocletian in 303.

Mirocles died on the 30 November of about 316, and his feast day was set on 3 December. His body was buried in Milan in the church of San Vittore al Corpo.
