= Religious policies of Constantine the Great =

Roman religious policy under Constantine I

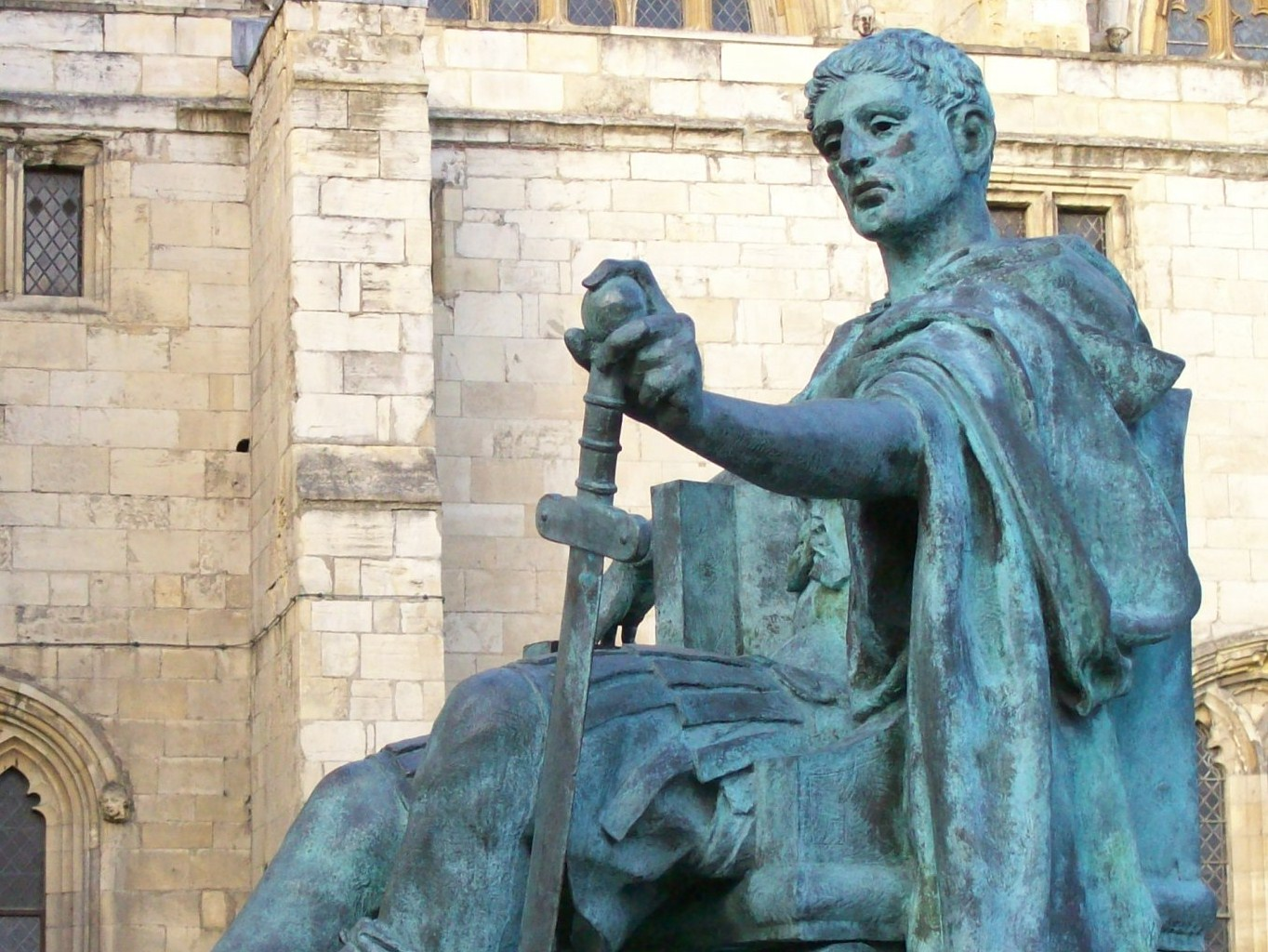
Constantine the Great, a sculpture by Philip Jackson in York

The religious policies of Constantine the Great have been called "ambiguous and elusive." Born in 273 during the Crisis of the Third Century (AD 235–284), Constantine the Great was thirty at the time of the Great Persecution. He saw his father become Augustus of the West and then shortly die. Constantine spent his life in the military warring with much of his extended family, and converted to Christianity sometime around 40 years of age. His religious policies, formed from these experiences, comprised increasing toleration of Christianity, limited regulations against Roman polytheism with toleration, participation in resolving religious disputes such as schism with the Donatists, and the calling of councils including the Council of Nicaea concerning Arianism. John Kaye characterizes the conversion of Constantine, and the Council of Nicea that Constantine called, as two of the most important things to ever happen to the Christian church.

== Historical background ==
=== Politics and persecution in Constantine's early years ===
==== Politics ====
The Crisis of the Third Century (AD 235–284), was a period of heavy barbarian invasions and migrations into Roman territory. According to Peter Brown, imperial Rome's system of government was an easy–going system which governed indirectly through the regional, local elites, and was not built to survive the strain of continuous invasions and civil wars. During this period of crisis, life in a "beleaguered superpower" included bankruptcies, political fragmentation and military losses. Constantine was born during this period in AD 273 and was raised a polytheist by his polytheist parents.

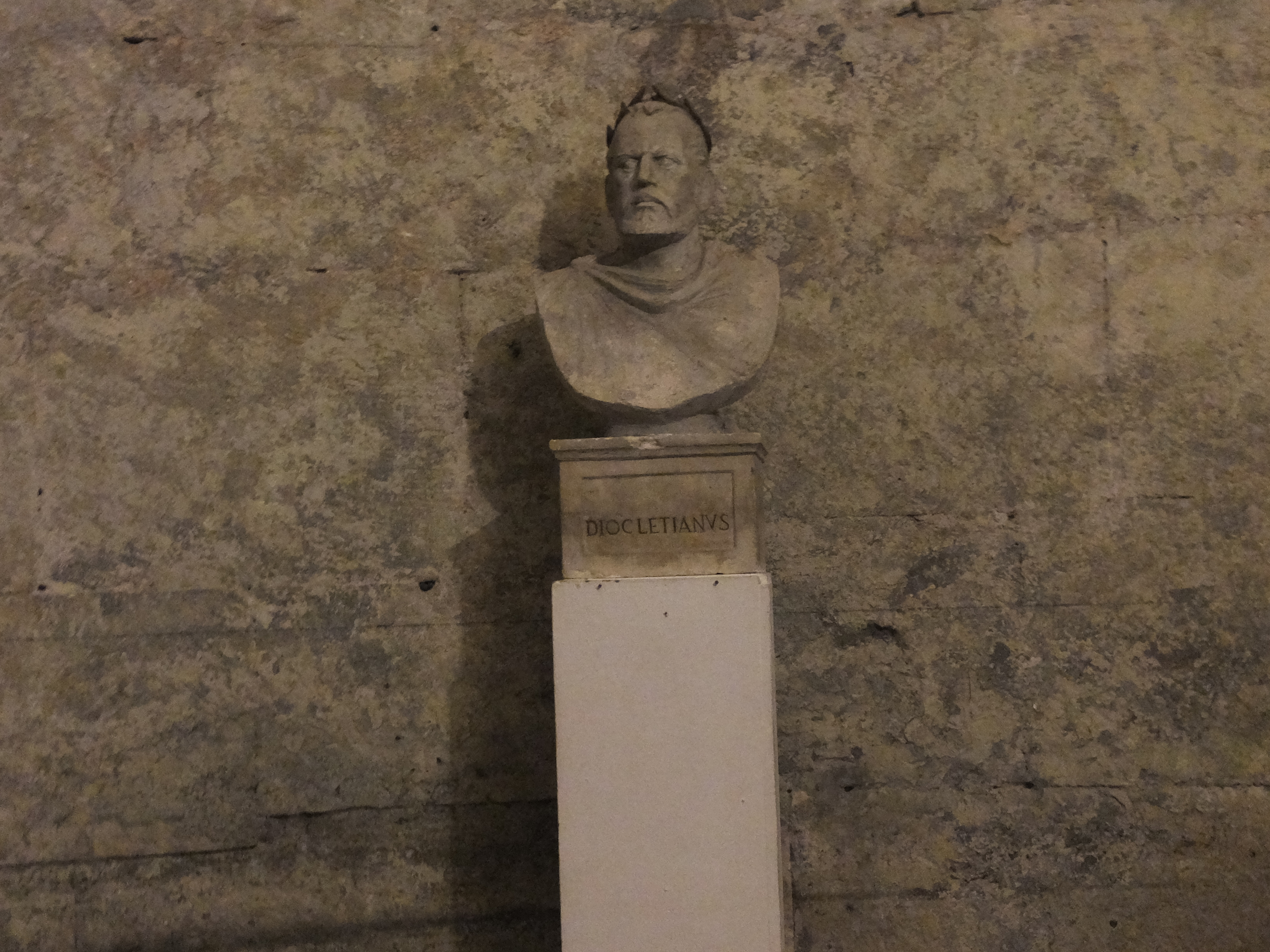
Roman Emperor Diocletian - panoramio

The third century crisis had begun with the assassination of Emperor Severus Alexander by his own troops in 235 which led to a 50-year long leadership crisis with at least 26 claimants to the title of emperor. By 268, the empire had split into three competing states. The crisis didn't end until Diocletian took the reins and implemented reforms in 284. He restructured the Roman government by establishing the Tetrarchy, a system with four men ruling jointly over an empire divided into two parts, East and West. Each part was headed by an Augustus who had a subordinate Caesar. Diocletian ruled as head Augustus in the East, from AD 284–305, with Maximian as Augustus in the West, AD 286–305. Diocletian established administrative capitals located closer to the empire's borders for each of the four Tetrarchs. These changes helped restore imperial power by the end of the third century.

While the Tetrarchy itself didn't last long, Jonathan Bardill says that it made some permanent changes to the empire. Government became more centralized around the imperial court as the only certain source of power and influence, and elites lost some of their wealth and status. Capital cities emerged in each region while other cities shrank. The cities were no longer as unique and different as they had been. The empire could no longer be seen as "a commonwealth of cities." Instead, what all cities had in common was ideology: a shared loyalty to the emperor and his followers.

Brown says that the empire became more intrusive into the personal lives of its subjects as it also became more committed to an ideological stance.

==== Persecution ====
This led to a suppression of Christianity that was more severe than any seen before and which took place on an empire-wide scale. On 24 February, AD 303, Diocletian issued the first of a series of edicts that rescinded Christians' legal rights and demanded compliance with traditional polytheistic religious practices. Christianity had existed for over 250 years; both the Church and the empire had changed in that time. The Church was no longer composed of tiny scattered groups. According to Peter Brown, it had become a 'universal church' that functioned as a "city within a city." There was a "Christian gentry" established in Asia Minor, and a developed hierarchy within the church, of leaders who were prominent in the Roman world of their day.

Persecution began with this leadership, forcing Christian bishops to participate in sacrifice to the traditional Roman gods or die. According to Norman H. Baynes, in the second year of the persecution, after the arrival of Urbanus as governor of Palestine, the imperial edict extending the order for sacrifice to the general public was then also published.

Known to Christians as the Great Persecution, Baynes says it had two phases. The first phase began with the issue of the First Edict in 303; the second phase began with the issue of the Fourth Edict, whose date and authorship are debated. David M. Potter says these edicts were enforced more in the East than in the West.

In addition to martyrdom, the First Edict also saw churches destroyed and demanded that the written scriptures and other Christian books be surrendered. At a time when the Emperor's law was seen as the divine source of order and peace, the Church claimed to possess its own universal divine law in the Christian scriptures, so the soldiers were sent out to confiscate and burn them. This is what scholars such as Maureen A. Tilley see as the cause of the Donatist schism. Donatists believed that every book of scripture was not just pen and ink, but was the physical manifestation of the Word of God, and that handing over the scriptures to be burnt, and handing over a martyr to die, were two sides of the same coin. Those who cooperated with the soldiers were, in the Latin, traditores, which originally referred to "handing over", but came to mean: traitors. Thereafter, Donatists refused to allow traditores back into church leadership positions. The Donatists would later become a thorn in Constantine's side which lasted throughout his reign.

In 305, Diocletian decided to resign and he compelled Maximian to retire as well. Galerius was Diocletian's son-in-law; both he and Constantius I, who was Constantine's father, had previously both been adopted by Diocletian. They were accordingly appointed Augustii of the East and West, respectively, on 1 May AD 305. Very soon after Diocletian stepped down, his successors began to struggle for control of the Roman Empire.

=== Family that divides together ===
Constantine and his father left Gaul and crossed into Britain to win a great battle over the Picts, but on 25 July 306, Constantine's father Constantius died in Eboracum (York). Afterwards, Constantine's father's troops proclaimed Constantine as Augustus in the West, and he agreed. However, Galerius didn't. Even though Constantine was the son of the Western Augustus Constantius, Diocletian had made a "rule" in 305 that sons should not follow their fathers in power. David Potter says stories circulating at the time said this was all part of the machinations of Galerius to prevent Constantine from becoming the senior emperor. The West at this time was still largely undeveloped. The military's support of Constantine forced Galerius as Augustus of the more developed and wealthier East, to recognize Constantine's claim, but only partially. Galerius appointed his own supporter Valerius Severus to the position of Augustus of the West, and proclaimed Constantine as Severus' subordinate Caesar.

Then, on 28 October 306, Maxentius, son of Maximian, declared himself Augustus of the West, holding Italy and living in Rome from AD 306–312. Maxentius summoned his father, Maximian, out of retirement for support. Maxentius was then declared a usurper, and Galerius ordered his co-Augustus, Severus, to dislodge Maxentius from Italy in early 307. Once Severus arrived in Italy, however, his army defected to Maxentius. Severus was captured and taken to the camp Tres Tabernae outside of Rome, where he either committed suicide, or was executed, in 307.

Galerius himself marched on Maxentius in Rome in the autumn of that year, but also failed to take the city. Constantine watched from Gaul and avoided conflict with both Maxentius and the Eastern emperors for most of this period. Constantine's holdings at this time were not much: mostly Britain, Gaul and Spain. Leithart says that, Constantine realized Galerius was an insecure foundation to build his future on, so Constantine made alliance with Maximian and Maxentius, sealing that alliance by marrying Maximian's daughter Fausta in the summer of AD 307.

In the spring of 308, Maximian attempted to depose his son, Maxentius, asking his former army to choose between father and son. They chose the son, and Maximian fled to his son-in-law Constantine.

Galerius nephew and Caesar was Maximinus II, also known as Maximinus Daia. After Severus' death, Maximinus expected to be raised to Augustus in his place and was bitterly disappointed in 308 AD, when at the Conference of Carnuntum, Licinius was declared Augustus of the West instead. In 310 AD, a bitter and disappointed Maximinus II allowed his troops to proclaim him Augustus. That makes five men with serious claims to the same position of Augustus in the West. The empire was in full out civil war.

Two claimants to the position of Augustus died in 310: The first was Alexander of Carthage who had proclaimed himself emperor in AD 308. Maxentius sent his praetorian prefect Rufius Volusianus to deal with Alexander who was subsequently taken prisoner and executed by strangulation. The next to die was Maximian, Constantine's father-in-law. In 310, Constantine deployed his father-in-law on a mission to Arles where Maximian proceeded to announce that Constantine was dead; then he declared himself emperor. Response wasn't what he hoped, and he fled to Marseilles, but Constantine force-marched his army there, and Maximian was caught and allowed, or ordered, to commit suicide. Constantine then broke off his alliance with his brother-in-law Maxentius and joined with Licinius who was to marry Constantine's sister, Constantia.

Peter Leithart points out that Constantine spent his life in the military, often fighting other Romans, who also happened to be members of his extended family. By the time Constantine's life ended, "he was responsible for the death of his father-in-law Maximian, his brother-in-law Maxentius, his sister's husband Licinius and their son, Constantine's nephew, his wife Fausta and her and Constantine's son Crispus, and a few other relatives."

==== Civil War ====
By 310, Galerius' health was failing and his power eroding. After his death in 311, the Balkan territories were quickly occupied by Licinius, while Maxentius obtained the populous and prosperous Asia Minor for himself to add to his holdings in Italy.

In the spring of 312, Constantine determined he needed to deal with Maxentius himself. Potter says scholars don't know who approached who, but Licinius and Constantine came to an agreement that appears to have involved mutual military support against Maxentius. While Licinius kept some of Maxentius' troops occupied in northern Italy, Constantine gathered an army of 40,000 soldiers and crossed the Alps heading toward Rome. According to Peter Leithart, Constantine met Maxentius' forces at Susa, Turin and Verona where he was victorious each time. According to T.Barnes, the praetorian prefect Ruricius Pompeianus, Maxentius' most senior general, was killed at Verona. "By October, Constantine was camped within sight of Rome, on the Tiber, near the Milvian Bridge."

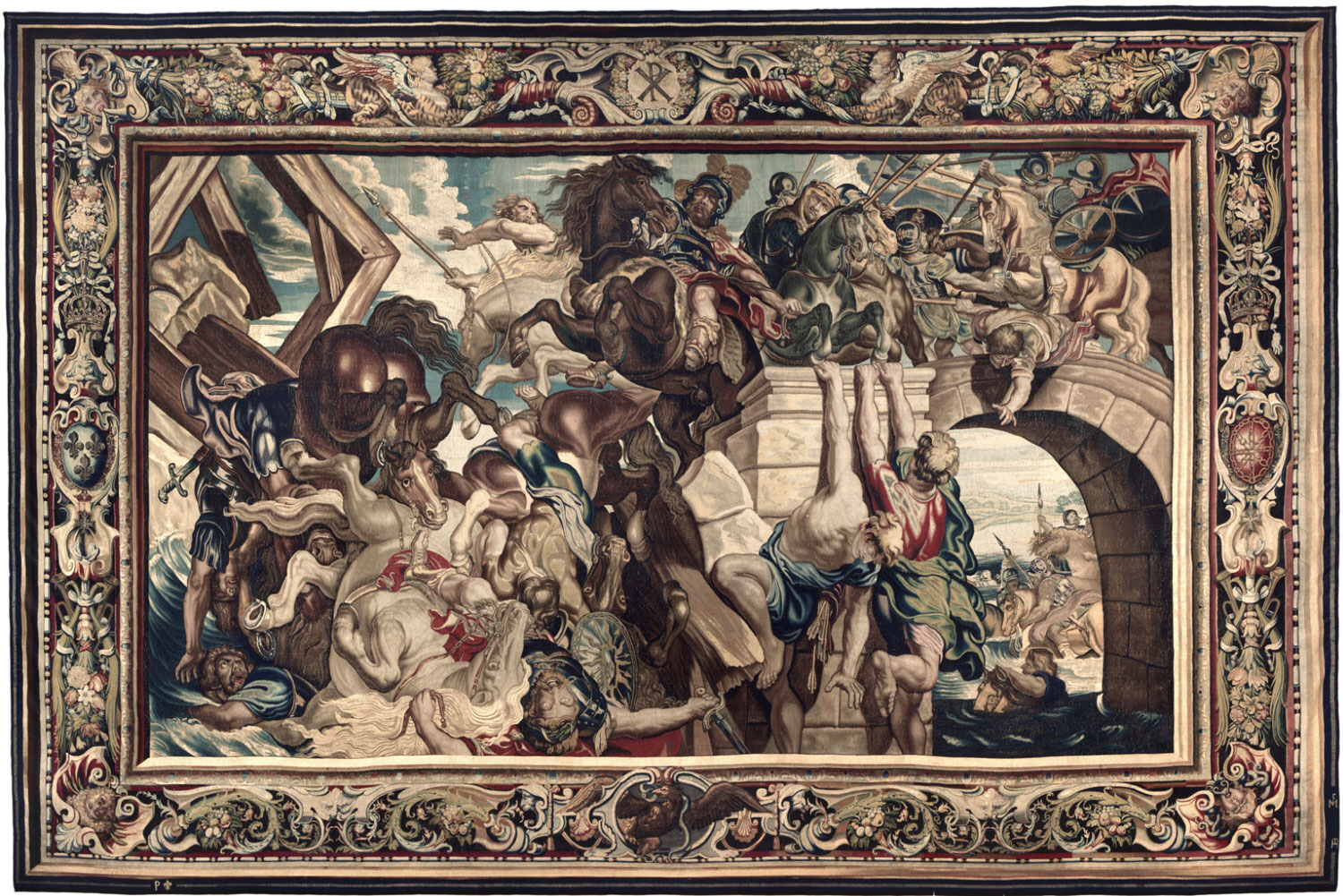
Triumph of Constantine over Maxentius at the Battle of the Milvian Bridge (tapestry) - 1623-1625

Averil Cameron says Lactantius records that Constantine had a dream the night before battle where he was told to place the chi-rho (a symbol of Christ) on his soldiers' shields. Eusebius, however, makes no mention of such a vision. Eusebius compares the battle to the triumph of Moses over Pharaoh at the Rea Sea since Maxentius and his soldiers "sank as lead into the mighty waters" as the Book of Exodus says of Pharaoh. Bardill says the two armies met at the Saxa Rubra as Constantine approached the capitol from his camp. Maxentius' troops were forced back to the Tiber river where Maxentius had destroyed the bridge in hopes of trapping Constantine's troops. They would have been forced to cross the Tiber on the remaining pontoons, but it was Maxentius who was trapped instead. Maxentius drowned when the pontoons came apart.

According to Troels Myrup Kristensen, the day after the battle, Maxentius body was found and decapitated, and his head was paraded through the streets of Rome before being taken to Africa.

== Conversion to Christianity ==
Nine years after Diocletian celebrated twenty years of stable rule with a smoking altar in the Roman Forum and the most severe persecution of Christians in the empire's history, the victorious Constantine I entered Rome and bypassed the altar on the capitol without offering sacrifice. According to Church historians writing after his death, Constantine had by then converted to Christianity, making him the first Christian Roman emperor. In his Oration to the Assembly of the Saints Constantine says he was not a child or a youth when he converted. Bardill says this is likely, as Constantine's parents were both polytheists; his mother was only persuaded to convert after Constantine had already done so. Bardill considers it likely Constantine converted some time between 310 and 315.

Brown calls Constantine's conversion a "very Roman conversion." "He had risen to power in a series of deathly civil wars, destroyed the system of divided empire, believed the Christian God had brought him victory, and therefore regarded that god as the proper recipient of religio. He did all of this without according religio to the traditional gods," and Brown says "this is how his subjects came to realize he was a Christian."

Brown says Constantine was over 40, had most likely been a traditional polytheist, and was a savvy and ruthless politician when he declared himself a Christian. His first step after conquering was to eclipse the memory of Maxentius, which he did by filling the center of Rome with monuments such as the Triumphal Arch and the Arch of Constantine. These monuments contain no reference to Christianity. However, in 312, Constantine ordered a statue of himself and Bardill quotes Eusebius as saying Constantine determined his statue should have "a trophy of the Savior's Passion to be set up beneath the hand of his own statue—indeed, he ordered them to place him in the most frequented spot in Rome, holding the saving sign in his right hand." Some time after 324, he wrote to the king of Persia, Shapur II: "Him I call upon with bended knee, shunning all abominable blood and hateful odors [of pagan sacrifice]."

Noel Lenski observes that the myth of Constantine being baptized by Pope Sylvester developed toward the end of the fifth century in a romantic depiction of Sylvester's life which has survived as the Actus beati Sylvestri papai (CPL 2235). Lenski says this story absolved the medieval church of a major embarrassment: Constantine's baptism by an Arian bishop, Eusebius of Nicomedia, which occurred while on campaign to Persia. According to Hans Pohlsander and Noel Lenski, Constantine swung through the Holy Land with the intent of being baptized in the Jordan river, but he became deathly ill at Nicomedia where he was swiftly baptized. He died shortly thereafter on 22 May 337 at a suburban villa named Achyron.

Francis Opoku writes that, "Whilst some are of the opinion that Constantine‟s conversion was genuine, others think that his policies to support Christians were for political expediency." As a converted Christian, why did he still have the unconquered sun —Sol Invictus— on his coins? Why was he never a properly instructed catechumen? Why was he not baptized until he was on his death bed? Constantine's initial grasp of Christianity was shallow, but as time went on Opoku says, it does seem as though he came to see himself as God's appointed sovereign, rewarded with divine favor. According to Opoku, "It thus appeared that Constantine gained, rather than lost, his willingness to exchange the style and title of a god for that of God's vice-regent."

=== Constantine's religious beliefs and policies ===
In Peter J. Leithart's view, Constantine was "a sincere if a somewhat simple believer." He ended the persecution of Christians, restored confiscated property to the churches, and adopted a policy toward non-Christians of toleration with limits. "He did not punish pagans for being pagans, or Jews for being Jews, and did not adopt a policy of forced conversion." Pagans remained in important positions at his court. He never engaged in a purge. Maxentius' supporters were not slaughtered when Constantine took the capital; Licinius' family and court were not killed. There were no pagan martyrs. Leithart says Constantine attributed his military success to God, and during his reign, the empire was relatively peaceful.

==== Paganism ====
Following the Battle of the Milvian Bridge, Constantine and his co-Augustus Licinius issued the Edict of Milan which granted religious toleration. The Edict protected all faiths from religious persecution, and allowed anyone to worship whichever deity they chose. According to H. A. Drake, much has been written from differing views on Constantine's religious policies, but "Constantine's commitment to unity in the church [is] one policy on which virtually all parties agree." Conflicting views only arise when the topic shifts to whether or not this unity included pagans. Drake says that Jacob Burckhardt characterized Constantine as being "essentially unreligious", using the Church solely to support his power and ambition. However, Drake goes on to say that "critical reaction against Burckhardt's anachronistic reading has been decisive." Burckhardt used a method rooted in the Reformation by choosing politics to question Constantine's religious conviction. According to Drake, this doesn't give an accurate view because politics is in everything and religion isn't determined by it.

Constantine never directly outlawed paganism. In the words of an early edict, he decreed that polytheists could "celebrate the rites of an outmoded illusion," so long as they did not force Christians to join them. In addition, there are accounts that indicate Constantine remained somewhat tolerant of the pagans. His provisions in the earlier Edict of Milan were restated in the Edict of the Provincials. Drake points out that this edict called for peace and tolerance: "Let no one disturb another, let each man hold fast to that which his soil wishes…" Constantine never reversed this edict. Drake contemplates whether Constantine may have been trying to create a society where the two religions were syncretized. However, Constantine also "assails pagan temples as 'temples of falsehood'," and denounces paganism as idolatry and superstition in the same document. Constantine and his contemporary Christians did not treat paganism as a living religion; it was defined as a superstitio— an 'outmoded illusion.'

According to Burckhardt and his followers, being Christian automatically meant being intolerant; however, as Drake points out, that assumes a uniformity of belief within Christianity that does not exist in the historical record. Brown says that the church was never monolithic. In Drake's view, there are indications that Constantine did not convert to a belief in a church of a few pristine elect, but to a belief in Christianity as a "big tent" capable of containing different wings. Drake says the evidence indicates Constantine favored those who favored consensus, chose pragmatists over ideologues of any persuasion, and wanted peace and harmony "but also inclusiveness and flexibility." In his article "Constantine and Consensus", Drake concludes that Constantine's religious policy was aimed at including the Church in a broader policy of civic unity, even though his personal views undoubtedly favored one religion over the other.

Some of Constantine's choices have not left historians with a simple reading of his beliefs. Johann Peter Kirsch says the consensus of the sources is that Constantine had both his son and wife executed at his instigation. He also ordered the execution of eunuch priests in Egypt because they transgressed his moral norms. According to MacMullen, Constantine made many derogatory and contemptuous comments relating to the old religion; writing of the "true obstinacy" of the pagans, of their "misguided rites and ceremonial", and of their "temples of lying" contrasted with "the splendours of the home of truth".

Although Constantine is regarded as the first Christian emperor, this does not mean that there were no longer any pagans in the empire. Christians most likely formed between sixteen and seventeen percent of empire at the time of Constantine's conversion. They did not have the numerical advantage to form a sufficient power–base to begin a systematic persecution of pagans. However, Brown reminds us "We should not underestimate the fierce mood of the Christians of the fourth century:" repression, persecution and martyrdom do not generally breed tolerance of those same persecutors. Brown says Roman authorities had shown no hesitation in "taking out" the Christian church that they saw as a threat to empire, and that Constantine and his successors did the same for the same reasons. Constantine would sporadically prohibit public sacrifice and close pagan temples; very little pressure, however, was put on individual pagans. Just as persecution of Christians had been sporadic, actions against pagans were also sporadic.

Lives were lost around the imperial court for various reasons and intrigues, but there is no evidence of judicial killings for illegal sacrifices before Tiberius Constantine (574-582). Drake and Hans-Ulrich Wiemer are two among many who agree that Constantine was generally not in favor of suppression of paganism by force. Instead, Constantine took steps to legally limit the public practice of pagan worship. Constantine's main approach was to use enticement by making the adoption of Christianity beneficial.

===== Ban on new temples and pillaging the old =====
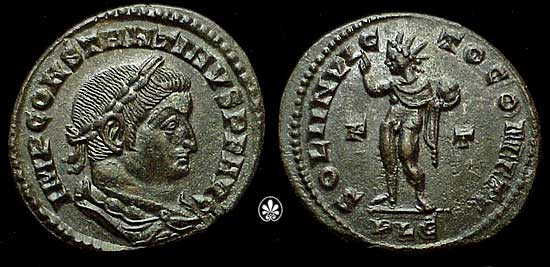
Follis issued 309/'10 by Constantine at Lugdunum. The reverse describes Constantine as the "companion of Sol Invictus". (Latin: SOLI INVICTO COMITI)

On Sunday 8 November 324, Constantine consecrated Byzantium as his new residence, Constantinoupolis — "city of Constantine" — with the local pagan priests, astrologers, and augurs. However, the emperor still went back to Rome to celebrate his Vicennalia: his twenty-year jubilee. Two years after the consecration of Constantinople, Constantine left Rome behind, returning to Constantinople permanently. On Monday 4 November 328, new rituals to dedicate the city as the new capital of the Roman empire were performed. Among the attendants were the Neoplatonist philosopher Sopater and pontifex maximus Praetextus. In commemoration, Constantine had a statue of the goddess of fortune Tyche built, and a column made of porphyry, where he placed a golden statue of Apollo with the face of Constantine looking toward the sun. Litehart says "Constantinople was newly founded, but it deliberately evoked the Roman past religiously as well as politically." On 11 May 330, the dedication of the city was celebrated with the festival of Saint Mocius and the striking of commemorative medallions and coins. Up until 325, Constantine had "continued to pay his public honors to the Sun" on coins that showed him jointly with Sol Invictus, whereas these later coins showed the labarum instead.

Although by this time Constantine openly supported Christianity, the city still offered room to pagan cults: there were shrines for the Dioscuri and Tyche. Hans-Ulrich Wiemer says there is good reason to believe the ancestral temples of Helios, Artemis and Aphrodite remained functioning in Constantinople as well. The Acropolis, with its ancient pagan temples, was left as it was.

Labarum of Constantine the Great

Several scholars indicate that in the new capital city of Constantinople, Constantine made sure there were no new pagan temples built and refused to allow blood sacrifice. However, according to French historian Gilbert Dagron, Constantine's reign did not constitute the end of temple construction altogether. He both permitted and commissioned temple construction in areas outside Constantinople. Trombley says the dedication of new temples is attested in the historical and archaeological records until the end of the 4th century.

Constantine pillaged many pagan sanctuaries, but according to Hans-Ulrich Wiemer, that pillaging was motivated more by a desire to supply his new capital with "imposing statuary" than it was by a desire to destroy paganism. Noel Lenski also says Constantinople was "literally crammed with statuary gathered, in Jerome's words, by 'the virtual denuding' of every city in the East." According to Ramsay MacMullen, Constantine did this as an act of anti-paganism. However, Wiemer says that Libanius, the contemporary chronicler of Constantine, writes in a passage from his In Defense of the Temples, that Constantine looted the Temples in order to get their treasures to build Constantinople, not because of anti-paganism.

According to Wiemer, Constantine destroyed some pagan sanctuaries, including the prestigious Asclepias at Cilician Aegeae. Constantine is also said to have destroyed the Temple of Aphrodite in Lebanon. He did 'confiscate' the military colony of Aelia Capitolina (Jerusalem), destroying a temple there for the purpose of constructing a church. Christian historians had alleged that Hadrian (2nd century) had constructed a temple of Aphrodite on the site of the crucifixion on Golgotha hill in order to suppress Jewish-Christian veneration there. Constantine used that to justify the temple's destruction, saying he was simply 'reclaiming' the property.

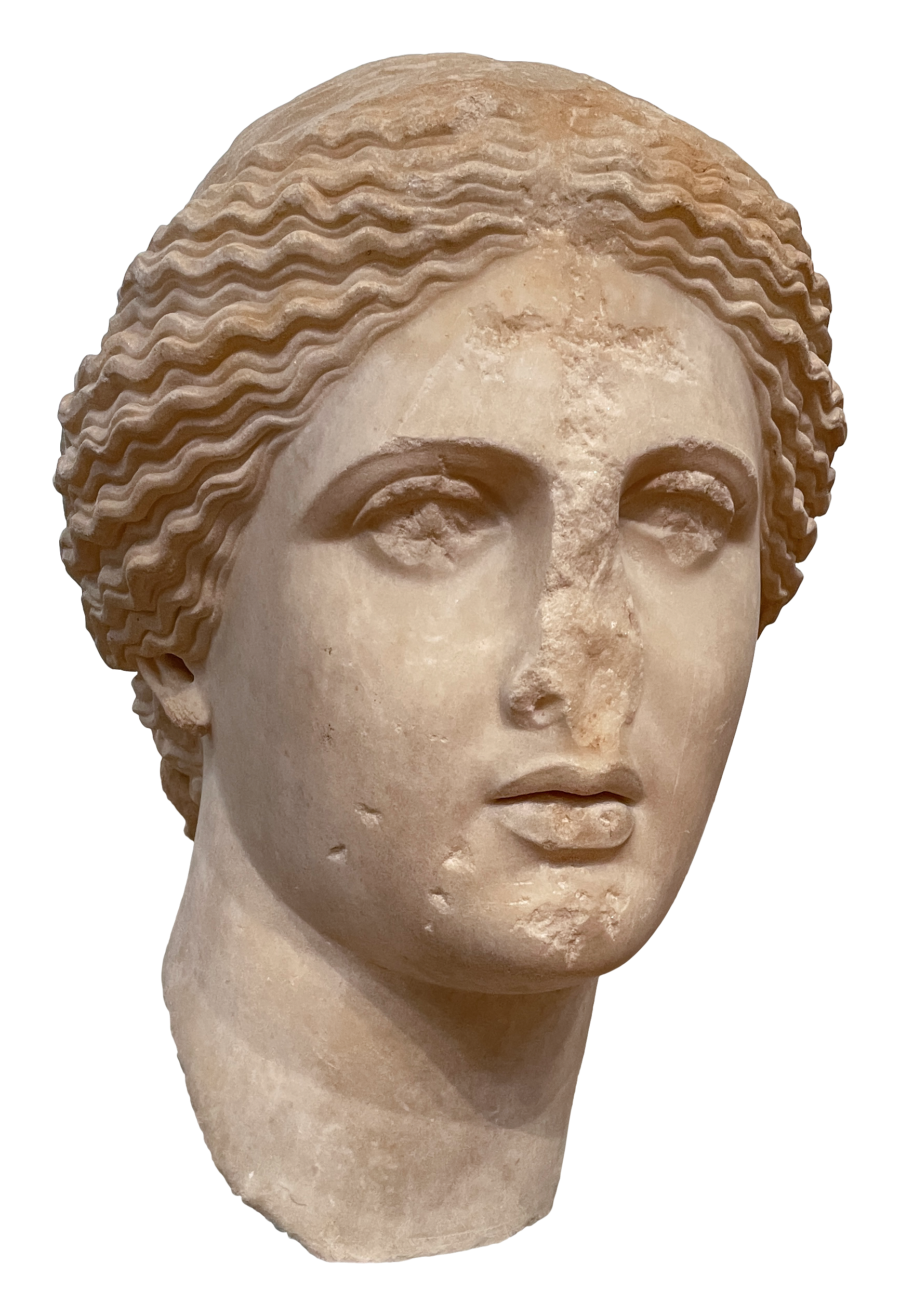
Head of Aphrodite, 1st century AD copy of an original by Praxiteles. The Christian cross on the chin and forehead was intended to "deconsecrate" a Holy pagan artifact. Found in the Agora of Athens. National Archaeological Museum in Athens.

Using the same vocabulary of reclamation, Constantine acquired several more sites of Christian significance in the Holy Land for the purpose of constructing churches. At the sacred oak and spring at Mambre, a site venerated and occupied by both Jews and pagans alike, written sources say that Constantine ordered the burning of the idols, the destruction of the altar, and erection of a church. The archaeology of the site, however, demonstrates that Constantine's church along with its attendant buildings, only occupied a peripheral sector of the precinct, leaving the rest unhindered.

Most of these sites had been "polluted" by pagan shrines and needed "desacrilization" or deconsecration before they could be used. (The practice of "cleansing" a sacred site of its previous spiritual influences was not limited to Christians.) According to Bayliss, the historical writings of Prudentius indicate the deconsecration of a temple merely required the removal of the cult statue and altar. However, this was often extended to the removal or even destruction of other statues and icons, votive stelae and all other internal imagery and decoration. Such objects were not always destroyed, some were desacralized or "cleansed" by having crosses chiseled onto them and perhaps a rite performed over them. Some were simply relocated and displayed as works of art. For example, the Parthenon frieze was preserved after the Christian conversion of the temple, although in modified form.

Constantine and his successors brought wealth, peace, and the opportunity to build a strong local position, to the churches. Christianity had already shown itself as able to distribute money in support of its religious causes; following the Roman tradition of endowments, Constantine became a donor of over-powering generosity. After 320, Constantine supported the Christian church with his patronage, built basilicas, and endowed the church with land and other wealth. He set up St.Peter's in Rome and San Giovanni in Laterano; in Antioch, he built a large golden domed octagon and the Church of the Holy Sepulchre in Jerusalem.

The construction of the Church of the Holy Sepulchre, and other churches built by Constantine after his mother the empress Helena undertook a trip to Palestine (326–328 AD), were only the beginning. By the end of the Byzantine period (235/325 - 614 AD), Mark A. Meyers writes that approximately 400 churches and chapels, along with over a hundred new synagogues, had been built in Palestine and Jordan.

Under Constantine, most of the temples remained open for the official pagan ceremonies and for the more socially acceptable activities of 'libation' and the offering of incense. Church restrictions opposing the pillaging of pagan temples by Christians were in place even while the Christians were being persecuted by the pagans. Despite the polemic of Eusebius, Constantine's principal contribution to the downfall of the temples lay primarily in his neglect of them.

===== Ban on sacrifices =====
Scott Bradbury writes that Constantine's policies toward pagans are "ambiguous and elusive" and that "no aspect has been more controversial than the claim he banned blood sacrifices." Sources on this are contradictory: Eusebius says he did; Labanius says it was Constantius II who did so and not Constantine I. According to R. Malcolm Errington, in Book 2 of Eusebius' De vita Constantini, chapter 44, Eusebius explicitly states that Constantine wrote a new law "appointing mainly Christian governors and also a law forbidding any remaining pagan officials from sacrificing in their official capacity."

Other significant evidence fails to support Eusebius' claim of an end to sacrifice. Constantine, in his Letter to the Eastern Provincials, never mentions any law against sacrifices. Errington says it is generally seen that the Letter's purpose "is to flatter and praise the Christians, to show the personal commitment of the emperor to their cause, while at the same time preventing a crusade against the unbelieving." Archaeologist Luke Lavan writes that blood sacrifice was already declining in popularity, just as construction of new temples was also declining, but that this seems to have little to do with anti-paganism. Drake says Constantine personally abhorred sacrifice and removed the obligation to participate in them from the list of duties for imperial officials, but evidence of an actual sweeping ban on sacrifice is slight, while evidence of its continued practice is great.

===== Legislation against magic and private divination =====
Michelle Salzman says that, in the fourth century, there was a conceptual connection between superstito as illicit divination or magic and fear of the divine. Laws against the private practice of divination had been enacted in the early imperial period of AD 1-30 before the time of the emperor Tiberius. Luke Lavan explains, private practices were associated with treason and secret plots against the emperor. The fear of a rival, had led many emperors to be severe against those who attempted to divine their successor. Maijastina Kahlos says that Christian emperors inherited this fear of private practices, including the fear of private divination. Emperors had long thought to keep knowledge of the future for themselves, therefore private divination, astrology, and 'Chaldean practices' became associated with magic and carried the threat of banishment and execution long before Constantine.

From emperor to emperor, private and secret rituals were constantly at risk of falling into the category of magic. However, Constantine's decree against private divination did not classify divination as magic, therefore, Constantine allowed the haruspices to practice their rituals in public. According to Kahlos, he still labeled it "superstitio."

==== Donatism ====
After the Diocletianic persecution, many of those who had cooperated with the authorities wanted to return to their positions in the church. Maureen Tilley, President of the North American Patristics Society, says the different responses to this 'returning' among the North African Christians were already becoming apparent by AD305.

According to Tilley, many of the North African Christians had a long established tradition of a "physicalist approach to religion." The sacred scriptures were not simply books to them, but were the Word of God in physical form; they saw handing over the Bible, and handing over a person to be martyred, as "two sides of the same coin." During the Great Persecution, "When Roman soldiers came calling, some of the [Catholic] officials handed over the sacred books, vessels, and other church goods rather than risk legal penalties" over a few objects. These cooperators became known as traditores; the term originally meant one who hands over a physical object, but it came to mean "traitor". The North African Christians who were the rigorists known as Donatists, continued to resent Roman government, and refused to accept the traditores back into church leadership positions, citing the need for ecclesiastical purity. This rejection extended to the traditores' descendants as well.

Catholics wanted to wipe the slate clean and accommodate the new government. There were also different views of baptism and some other practices, but Alan Cameron says Donatism was not an actual heresy with differences in important doctrine, instead, it was a schism over differences in practices.

In 311, the bishop of Carthage, Mensurius, died. The twelve bishops of the region were supposed to gather and elect a successor, but instead, the Donatists and the Catholics, each elected one of their own, and neither would accept the other's nominee. The rigorists elected Majorinus who was succeeded by Donatus, giving the movement its name.

The Donatists appealed to Constantine to decide who would be the real bishop of Carthage. Christians expected Constantine to be the arbiter of all religious disputes. It was simply part of the emperor's job. Harold A. Drake says that, "since the Jovian dynasty when Diocletian established the empire as one expressly based on divine support, the lack of consensus on religious matters was no small thing." Constantine had already appointed a council at Rome under Pope Miltiades in 313 to deal with the issue of Donatism, and in 314, he also appointed an appeals commission that met at Arles to sort out who should be the rightful bishop. The commission found in favor of the Catholic bishop. The Donatists rejected the commission's findings and refused compromise.

Therefore, Tilley says, "it became Constantine's imperial and religious duty" to impose acceptance. Constantine responded with moderate to severe repression. The first Donatist' martyr stories come from the years 317 to 321. Tilley indicates this was a response of the state to the need for public order and was also a specifically Roman response from the emperor's need to keep the pax deorum (‘the benevolence of gods’) – the peace between Heaven and earth.

Sociologist Joseph Bryant sees the Donatist controversy as the culmination of the dynamic process of a sect changing into a church. Bryant asserts that Christianity changed from being a "marginal, persecuted, and popularly despised ... sect" in the first century, to a fully institutionalized church capable of embracing the entire Roman empire, by the third century. He explains that, "The governing principle of the sectarian pattern of association is not in the institutional apparatus, but in the personal holiness of its members". A church, on the other hand, is an organization where sanctity is found in the institution rather than the individual. To become a church, Bryant says "Christianity had to overcame its alienation from the 'world' and successfully weather persecution, accept that it was no longer an ecclesia pura, (a sect of the holy and the elect), but was instead a corpus permixtum, a 'catholic' Church geared to mass conversions and institutionally endowed with extensive powers of sacramental grace and redemption".

Without what Peter Brown has called "the conversion of Christianity" to the culture and ideals of the Roman world", Brown says Constantine would never have converted, but this "momentous transformation" also threatened the survival of the marginal religious movement as it naturally led to divisions, schisms and defections. Bryant explains that, "once those within a sect determine that the 'spirit' no longer resides in the parent body, 'the holy and the pure' typically find themselves compelled – either by conviction or coercion – to withdraw and establish their own counter-church, comprised of the 'gathered remnant' of God's elect".

Since Constantine had commissioned more than one investigation into the Donatist issues, and because they had all ruled in support of the Catholic cause, yet the Donatists refused to submit to either imperial or ecclesiastical authority, that would have been sufficient cause to act. Constantine became the first Emperor in the Christian era to persecute specific groups of Christians. Brown says Roman authorities had shown no hesitation in "taking out" the Christian church they saw as a threat to empire, and Constantine and his successors did the same, for the same reasons.

Constantine's persecution of these Christians was no more successful than Diocletian's had been, and in 321, Constantine acknowledged failure and cancelled the laws against the Donatists. For the next 75 years, both parties existed, often directly alongside each other, with a double line of bishops for the same cities. This eventually led to a second phase of persecution, but the Donatists survived until Arab armies overran North African in the closing years of the seventh century.

==== Arianism and the Council of Nicea ====
John Kaye characterizes the conversion of Constantine, and the council of Nicea that Constantine called, as two of the most important things to ever happen to the Christian church. Throughout his reign, Constantine's involvement with the church was dominated by its many conflicts defining orthodoxy versus heterodoxy, or heresy. Michele R. Salzman indicates heresy was a higher priority than pagans for most Christians of the fourth and fifth centuries including Constantine.

The most notable of these heresies was the 56-year long Arian controversy with its debate of Trinitarian formulas. Donatism was a 'schism' (differences were over practices not doctrine) that was geographically limited to northern Africa; Arianism, on the other hand, was seen as an actual heresy: wrong belief. Arians believed the Father, Son and Holy Ghost were not equals. Most fourth and fifth century church controversies centered on the nature of Christ and his exact relation to God and man. Unlike Donatism, Arianism was spread throughout much of the empire, including among Germanic tribes, like the Visigoths, who were just converting.

While it is generally accepted that Arianism began in 318, William Telfer writes that dating its beginning is highly problematic. Kaye says it started in Alexandria, between the bishops Arius and Alexander, and quickly spread through Egypt and Libya and the other Roman provinces. Bishops engaged in "wordy warfare," and the people divided into parties, while the pagans ridiculed them all. At the center of the controversy was Athanasius who became the "champion of orthodoxy" in Alexander's place.

Constantine got news of the conflict sometime before his last war with Licinius, and was deeply distressed by it. After fruitless letter writing and the sending of other bishops to promote reconciliation, Constantine called for all church leaders to convene in 325 in Nicea in Bithynia (in present-day Turkey) to settle the issue. Constantine presided at the council. Kaye references Sozomen as saying Constantine opened with a speech in which he exhorted the bishops as friends and ministers to resolve conflict and embrace peace. Sozomen says the bishops accordingly broke out in mutual accusation. Constantine mediated, occasionally severely corrected, persuaded and praised, and eventually brought them to agreement. The result was the Nicene Creed, from which five bishops abstained. They were banished for a time, then eventually returned. Athanasius was then ousted from his bishopric in Alexandria in 336 by the Arians, forced into exile, and lived much of the remainder of his life in a cycle of forced movement as power went back and forth between the two groups.

The controversy became political after Constantine's death. Athanasius died in 373, but his orthodox teaching was a major influence in the West, and on Theodosius, who became ruler in 381. The Nicene creed remained the official creed of the church.

== See also ==
- Serpent Column
