= Gaguari =

Africa Proconsularis (AD 125)

Gaguari (Latin: Gaguaritanus) is a former diocese of North Africa and since 1933 a titular bishopric. The location of the former diocese is for the moment unknown. Under Roman hegemony, the bishop belonged to the province of Byzacène. This province was located in North Africa. The exact location of Gaguari can not be determined for the current state of research. However, everything leads us to believe that the bishopric site localizes to the current Sahel of Tunisia.

== History ==
In the early years of the fourth century, the emperor Diocletian undertook a great persecution against Christians. In North Africa, the governors of the provinces of proconsular Africa and Numidia ordained as priests and bishops engaged texts and objects of worship. Those who had not opposed the abuses were called lapsi ("the lapsed") and those who supplied texts and objects were called traditores ("deliverers").

Since the administration and the sacraments of the persons guilty of this weakness were held to be invalid, the accusation, whether true or not, became a means of undermining the authority and ambition of certain men. It is in this context of suspicion that originated and developed the Donatism. After the election of Cecilian as bishop of Carthage in 311, a group of Numidian bishops under the direction of their primate Secundus of Tigisis decreed the ordination invalid. One of the electoral bishops, Felix of Aptunga, would have been a traitor. They then elected Majorinus bishop of Carthage. This is the beginning of the Donatist schism which owes its name is the successor of Majorinus, Donatus, an influential priest of the movement.

Several reasons are attributed to the rise of Donatism, political, religious and social. However, it would appear to be a clash of strong personalities that brought rapid development of schism.

Under the reign of Constantine I, several measures of repression to Donatism were applied in vain. This is why, in 321, Constantine published an edict to authorize Donatism.

After 25 years of existence, the Donatist Church had its own network of bishops, organized its own councils, gathered its own renamed faithful since the sacraments of the other bishops were not valid from the Donatist point of view. The "Counter-Church" then had 270 bishops and subsisted by itself. However, the Emperor Constantius II ordered the merger of rival churches in 347. This measure led to an outburst of violence against the imperial order in Numidia. In 361 or 362, the Emperor Julian decided to grant an edict of tolerance to all Christian sects banned by Constance, which gave him new momentum to Donatism. His successor, Theodosius I, also failed to solve the Donatist schism.

The conflict took a decisive turn after the appointment of the bishop Aurelius in 391. He decided to join Augustine of Hippo, in order to stem Donatism. Thus, a Council of Carthage (411), brought together bishops from both sides. It is at this point that Rogatus, Bishop of Gaguari, renounced Donatism for Catholicism. The schism ended gradually from 413 under the action of Augustine and the repression of Honorius.

== Historical records ==
Gaguari seems to have been forgotten, but it is nevertheless listed in many books.

Various parameters in the ancient world may explain the disappearance of a bishop (or traces of this diocese) to Gaguari. First, there were a large number of bishoprics in ancient North Africa, especially during the Donatist schism. The organization of the African provinces left a certain autonomy to the cities. Subsequently, these cities will require more religious freedoms: they wanted to have their own bishop. This explains the large number of bishops at the time, . Unfortunately, only half of them have been identified as Gaguari.

Second, from 645, the councils that previously met all the bishops of North Africa will now meet more than the provincial level. Details of these meetings are today largely unknown, only synodal letters were retained. Third, the seats of bishops (and therefore Gaguari) at the time of Donatism can be of different types: a city or town more or less large, a big farm or a community of families. Fourth, recurrent Berber revolts in the southern province of Byzacène did reduce the number of bishop from 115 to 43, between 484 and 646 also observed a decrease in community size.

== Bishops ==
=== Ancient diocese ===
- Rogatus (fl. 411), abandoned the Donatists in favor of the Catholics at the Council of Carthage
- Victor (fl. 480), bishop during a persecution by the Vandals

=== Titular diocese ===
- Mario Roberto Emmett Anglim (1922–1973): Born March 4, 1922 the United States. He was a member of the "Congregation of the Most Holy Redeemer" in 1942. He was ordained priest in the same congregation in 1948. In 1964 he became bishop of Coari in Brazil. It is March 23, 1966 he received the bishopric holder Gaguari by Paul VI. He died on 13 April 1973.
- Diego Gutiérrez Pedraza (1926–1990): Born September 26, 1926 in Spain. In 1951 he was ordained a priest in "The Order of Saint Augustine". In 1973, he became bishop of Cafayate in Argentina and titular bishop of Gaguari. On 3 November 1977, he renounced the title of titular bishop of Gaguari. He died on 23 November 1990.
- Jose Sixto Parzinger Foidl (1931): Born December 21, 1931 in Austria, he was ordained priest of the "Order of Friars Minor Capuchin" in 1960. He became Apostolic Vicar in December 1977 in Araucania, in Chile, and titular bishop of Gaguari. In 2001, he renounced the diocese and was the holder of Villarrica in Chile. He was discharged from this position in 2009.
- Francisco Moreno Barron (1954): Born October 3, 1954 in Spain, he was ordained a priest in the Archdiocese of Morelia in Mexico in 1979. In 2002 he became auxiliary bishop of Morelia and titular bishop of Gaguari. In 2008 he ceased his previous positions to become bishop of Tlaxcala in Mexico.
- Manuel Cruz Aurelio (1953) : Born December 2, 1953 in Cuba, he was ordained priest in 1980 in the Archdiocese of Newark to the United States. He became auxiliary bishop of Newark in 2008 as well as titular bishop of Gaguari. Currently he is still in office.
