= Purpurius =

Purpurius was a Donatist bishop from 305 to 320 AD, who was instrumental in establishing the Donatist movement of Roman North Africa.

He is known from several correspondences. It was Purpurius who first introduced the likening of the Donatist community as a new expression of the Israelites following Moses in the Desert.

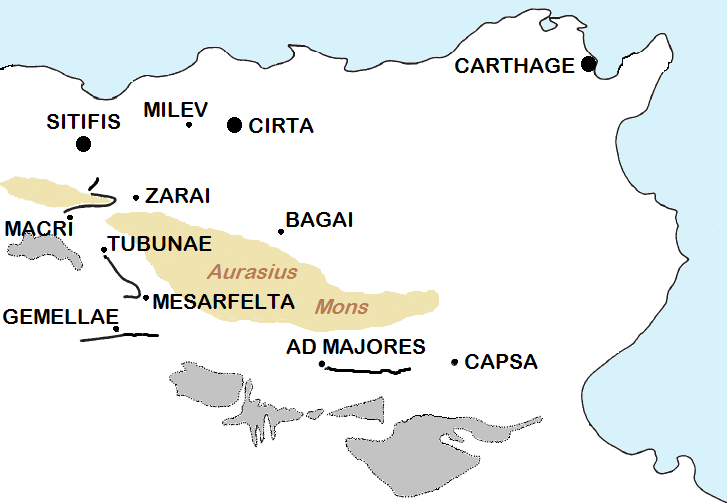
Cirta in Roman times was protected to the south and west by the "Limes romanus" called Fossatum Africae

He was an attendee at the Synod of Cirta, the beginning of the Donatist movement. Optatus tells he had a dispute with Secundus of Tigisis, who charged him as a murderer, a charge he admitted. The accusation was he had murdered his nephews at Milevus, though we are not told what the circumstance of the act were. Augustine describes him as a violent man.

Optatus also claims he was brigand and had stolen vinegar from the imperial stores.

These accusations, however, did not exclude him from the meeting. As historian Maureen Tilley puts it

...since Purpurius had not been a traditor... he was still a member – albeit a sinful member – of the true church. His private affairs, even murder, were no bar to his participation in the ritual of consecration.
