= Secundus of Tigisis =

Early church leader, primate of Numidia

Secundus of Tigisis (fl. 310) was an early church leader and primate of Numidia. He was a leading organiser of the early Donatist movement in Carthage.

== Biography ==
=== Personal life ===
Little is known about Secundus' personal life. He lived in Numidia during the Diocletianic Persecution and was Bishop of Tigisis. Later in life, Secundus was convicted by a Roman court of being a traditor and a thief, but it is possible that this verdict was motivated by Secundus' support of the Donatist Schism.

He is mentioned in the Notitia Provinciarum et Civitatum Africae.

=== Council of Cirta (305) ===
The Council of Cirta was held in the spring of AD 305 to elect a new bishop for the town. The Bishops present included Secundus of Tigisis, Donatus of Mascula, Marinus of Aquae Tibilitanae, Donutus of Calama, Purpurius of Limata, Victor of Garbis, Felix of Rotarium, Nabor of Centurio, Silvanus, and Secundus the younger. All of those present were accused of crimes, including thievery, book burning, and burning incense as an offering to pagan gods. Secundus was elected primate of the council, but not without controversy. Secundus was known to be opposed to the consecration of traditors, or bishops who had turned over the Scriptures to the Romans during the Diocletianic Persecution. At the beginning of the meeting, Secundus asked those assembled whether they had been traditors. Nearly all at once confessed that they were guilty. One bishop, Purpurius of Limata, accused Secundus of capitulating during the persecution. Secundus denied this, and Purpurius refused to take back his accusation. Secundus accused Purpurius of murder, which Purpurius admitted but countered with the accusation that Secundus had been a traditor. After a lengthy debate, the Council set aside the issue of traditors and appointed Silvanus, a confessed traditor, as Bishop of Cirta.

Following the meeting, Mensurius, the Bishop of Carthage, wrote to Secundus to explain his actions during the persecution, claiming that he had only handed over heretical works. Mensurius explained that he had taken the canonical texts from the church to his own house, and had replaced them with heretical writings. When the authorities came to the Church, Mensurius claimed that he gave them the heretical texts rather than the real ones. Even though the officials asked for more, the proconsul of the province had refused to search the Bishop's private home. Secundus responded without directly blaming Mensurius, but he pointedly praised the martyrs in his own province who had been tortured and put to death for refusing to surrender the Scriptures, and mentioned that he himself replied to the officials who asked him for the Scriptures: "I am a Christian and a bishop, not a traditor."

=== Donatist Controversy ===
The Bishop of Carthage, Mensurius, died in 311. Caecilian, a deacon under Mensurius and a traditor, was appointed as his successor and consecrated by Felix of Aptungi. Secundus was opposed to the election of a traditor as bishop, and presided over the rival Council of 70 that elected Majorinus instead. In 315, Majorinus died and was succeeded by Donatus Magnus, who would serve as Bishop of Carthage for 40 years.

Those who supported Donatus rather than Caecilian as Bishop of Carthage soon became known as the Donatists. The Donatists held that both Caecilian and his predecessor, Mensurius, had been traditors and thus the sacraments they administered were invalid. The Donatists appealed to Emperor Constantine, who asked Pope Miltiades to oversee a hearing with three neutral bishops. The Pope held a hearing, but summoned 16 additional Bishops who all opposed the Donatists. Both Cecilian and Donatus appeared with a delegation of 11 each. The decision of the tribunal favored Cecilian, causing Donatus to appeal to the Emperor a second time. Constantine convened the Synod of Arles, which also condemned Donatism. Donatus and Secundus refused to recant, and Donatism continued to be popular among Berbers in North Africa until the arrival of Islam.

== Assessment ==
Secundus has been described as having intemperate zeal. He certainly believed in Rigorism, or the idea that in times of crisis there is no moral path except that supported by the Church. His intransigence in this belief, as well as the intransigence of Donatus, is often cited as a prime cause of the schism, since neither man would have accepted a more moderate candidate for bishop if he was proposed by Mensurius.
