= Abthugni =

Ancient city in Roman North Africa

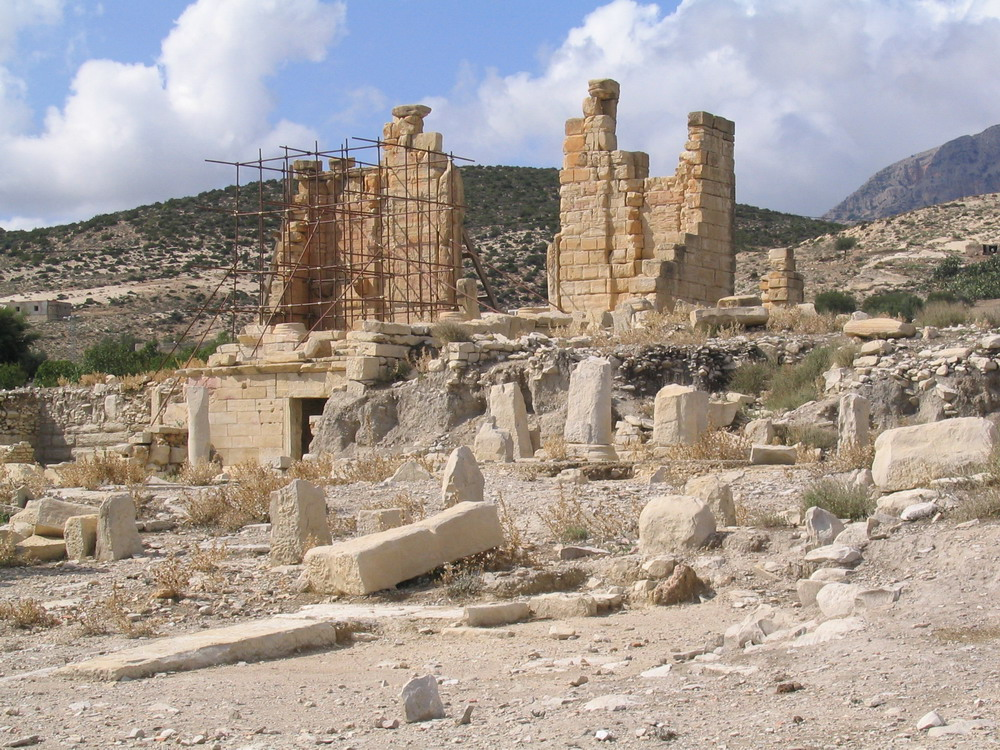
- The ruins at Abthugni

- Location within Tunisia
- 36°12′00″N 10°01′00″E
- Type: Settlement

Abthugni (Punic: 𐤀𐤐𐤁𐤂𐤍, ʾpbgn, or 𐤀𐤐𐤕𐤁𐤂𐤍, ʾptbgn) was an ancient city in Roman North Africa at present day Suwar (Henchir-es-Souar) in Tunisia. It was, in Roman times, in the province of Africa Proconsularis, Africa, and latter in Byzacena. In late antiquity Abthugni was also the seat of a bishop, and the diocese is a titular see of the Roman Catholic Church to this day.

== Location ==
The city was located at Henchir-es-Souar in the hill country south of Uthica, 25 kilometres (16 mi) from Zaghouan at an elevation of 200 feet (61 m) above sea level. It was a suffran of Carthage. According to Ferchiou, the name of the place is to be reconstructed as Abtugnos.

== History ==
The city was probably founded in the 3rd century BC, and was well established by 30 BC.

Numerous inscriptions have been found documenting the history of Abthugni

The Roman consul Gaius Rutilius Gallicus performed survey work near Abthugni during the reign of Vespasian. Hadrian made Abthugni a city of Municipium status.

During the Diocletian Persecution the city's Christian community is said to have meet near a cemetery outside the city area, to avoid the jurisdiction of the town officials. In the 4th century during the time of the emperor Valens some of the public buildings were restored.

The town was a Byzantine fortress in late antiquity.

== Archaeology ==
There are a few ruins of the city, including several temples, baths and tombs. The first investigations at the Capitolium of Abthugnos were undertaken by Gauckler and Cagnat at the end of the 19th century. Ernest Babelon lists many preserved buildings, including two temples, the Byzantine city wall, a rectangular basin, and a mausoleum. Recent work was led by Nadié Ferchiou, in the course of which the entire Forum area and the Capitolium were excavated.

Considerable ruins in the Byzantine enclosure include two temples, including a capitol and a rectangular pool which is accessed by thirteen steps. There is also a mausoleum and great many ruined monuments.

== Bishopric ==
The city was the seat of an ancient bishopric. Known bishops include *Felix of Aptunga, one of three bishops who consecrated Cæcilianus, therefore precipitating the Donatist controversy. The proto-Donatist in Cirta called his consecration invalid,

- Magnus fl. 345-348
- Felix fl. 411
- Saturnus fl. 525

The diocese ceased to function effectively in the late 7th century with the coming of Islamic armies. However the diocese was re-founded in name in 1933.

The current bishop is Adelio Pasqualotto who replaced Paul Henry Walshin December 2014.
