= Caecilianism =

Caecilianism or Caecilianists may refer to:

- the party of Caecilianus during the 4th-century Donatist schism
- Cecilian Movement, 19th-century church music reform
