= Lateran council =

Catholic church council

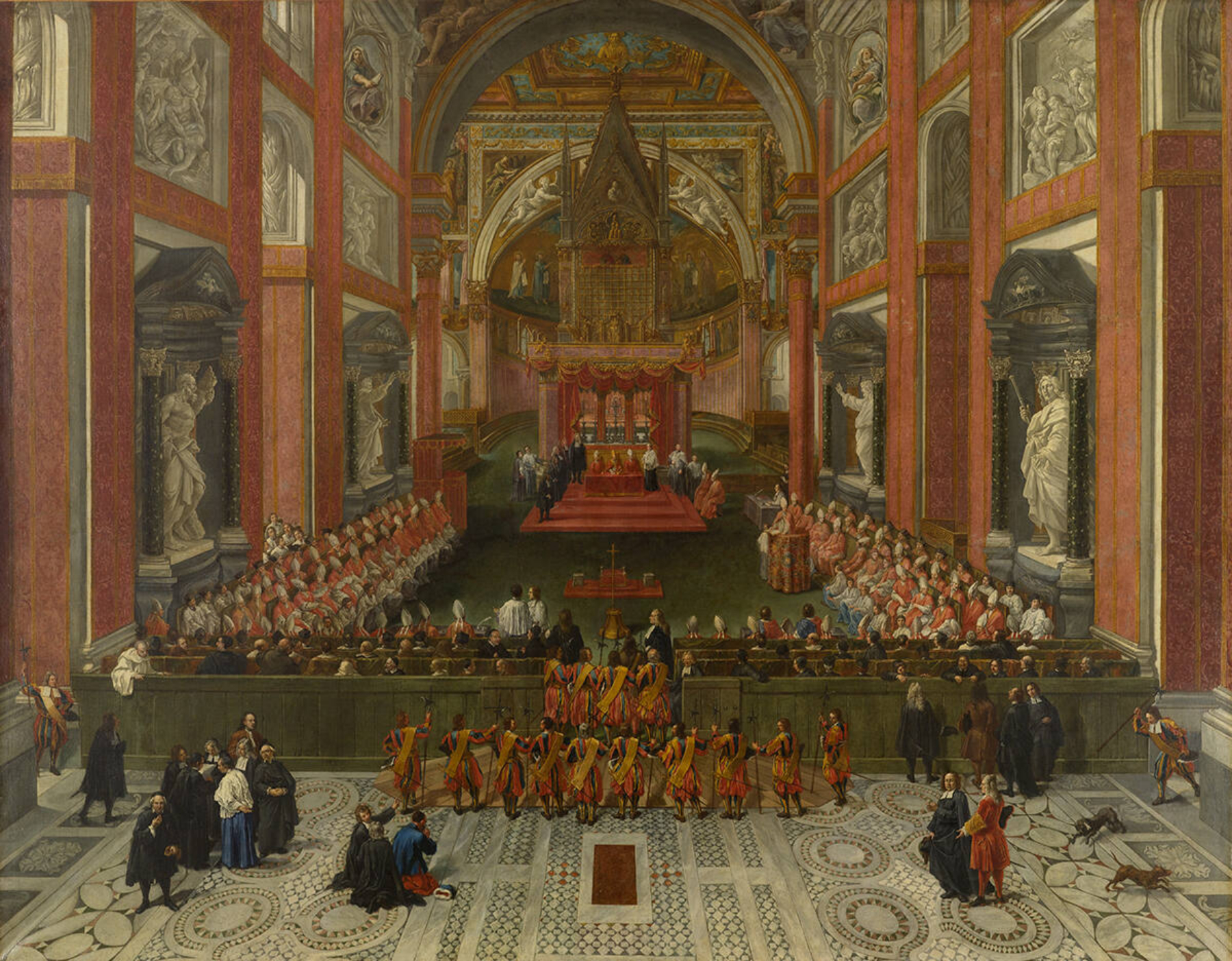
The Provincial Roman Synod of 1725 by Pier Leone Ghezzi

The Lateran councils were ecclesiastical councils or synods of the Catholic Church held at Rome in the Lateran Palace next to the Lateran Basilica. Ranking as a papal cathedral, this became a much-favored place of assembly for ecclesiastical councils both in antiquity (313, 487) and more especially during the Middle Ages.

== Prominent synods ==
Among these numerous synods the most prominent are five which the tradition of the Catholic Church has classed as ecumenical councils:

1. The First Council of the Lateran (1123) followed and confirmed the concordat of Worms.
2. The Second Council of the Lateran (1139) declared clerical marriages invalid, regulated clerical dress, and punished attacks on clerics by excommunication.
3. The Third Council of the Lateran (1179) limited papal electees to the cardinals alone, condemned simony, and forbade the promotion of anyone to the episcopate before the age of thirty.
4. The Fourth Council of the Lateran (1215) dealt with transubstantiation, papal primacy, and conduct of clergy. It said Jews and Muslims should wear a special dress to distinguish them from Christians.
5. The Fifth Council of the Lateran (1512–1517) attempted reform of the church.

A number of non-ecumenical councils were held at the Lateran, including the Lateran Council of 649 against Monothelitism, the Lateran Council of 769 against iconoclasm, and the Lateran Council of 964.

== Other noteworthy synods ==
- In the synod of 313, Donatism was declared a heresy. This was followed up a year later in the Council of Arles.
