= Donatus Magnus =

Founder of Donatism (d. c. 355)

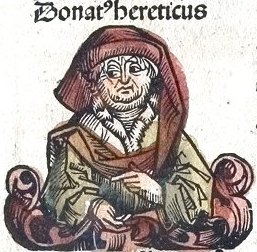
A depiction of Donatus from the Nuremberg Chronicle, where he is labeled a heretic

Donatus Magnus, also known as Donatus of Carthage, was a prophetic and charismatic leader who emerged in the early fourth century as the founder of the Donatist movement, a Christian sect that arose in North Africa as a result of the Diocletianic Persecution.

== Life ==
Donatus was born in Theveste around the year 270 into an ancient Christian family reputedly evangelized by the Apostle Simeon the Zealot during his mission to Carthage and Africa. He later appears in Church records as Donatus of Casae Nigrae in October 313, when the Roman bishop accused him of re-baptizing clergy who had lapsed and of fomenting a schism within the Church. Casae Nigrae was a settlement situated on the far southern edge of the Numidian plains, south of Theveste.

== The Schism ==
During the wave of Christian persecutions under the Roman Emperor Diocletian, Roman authorities demanded that Christians surrender their sacred scriptures, intending to revise them to depict Jesus in a manner more sympathetic to Roman authority. To escape torture, exile, or execution, many Christians of Roman origin complied, handing over their scriptures, liturgical texts, and other ecclesiastical possessions to the imperial officials. These individuals came to be known as traditores.

The schism between the two Christian factions revolved primarily around the status of traditor clergy. The Libyco-Punic party argued that those who had surrendered sacred texts under persecution had forfeited their spiritual authority and could not be reinstated without undergoing re-baptism and re-ordination. They maintained that sacraments administered by traditores were invalid and viewed scriptures written in Latin and Greek as potentially corrupted, favoring texts preserved in their own native tongue unblemished by the hand of Roman scribes. In contrast, the Greco-Roman faction held that traditores could be restored to office without the need for re-baptism or re-ordination and accept their canon.

During the Diocletianic Persecution in Carthage, many Christians barricaded themselves inside the church, choosing martyrdom over surrender as they courageously defended sacred property from pagan confiscation. The Romans enlisted a traditor named Mensurius to persuade the Christians of Carthage to submit to imperial authority. Acting on Mensurius’s orders, his servant Caecilian approached the besieged believers with false assurances: that the persecution had ended, that their act of defiance would be pardoned, and that Church property would remain untouched if they peacefully departed. Trusting his promises, the Christians emerged from the church, only to be ambushed by Roman soldiers lying in wait. Many were captured and crucified before the gates of Carthage. As a reward for his betrayal, the Romans appointed Mensurius as Bishop of Carthage.

Following the death of Mensurius of Carthage in 311, Caecilian was appointed his successor by the Roman authorities. He was consecrated as Bishop of Carthage and Primate of Africa by Felix of Aptungi, himself a known traditor. In response, Secundus of Tigisis, the legitimate Primate of Numidia, convened a council of seventy bishops at Cirta, which declared Caecilian’s ordination invalid on the grounds that it had been performed by a traditor. Caecilian, who already occupied the basilica, refused to attend the council in person but sent word that, should his consecration be deemed invalid, he was willing to be re-consecrated. In Carthage, it was widely known that Caecilian had been the preferred candidate of the Roman occupiers and that both he and Felix of Aptungi had previously surrendered the Sacred Scriptures.

The council responded by consecrating Majorinus as Bishop of Carthage. This marked the beginning of a deep ecclesiastical divide, as many cities across North Africa soon found themselves with two rival bishops, one aligned with the Roman-backed Caecilian, and the other loyal to Majorinus. After the early death of Majorinus, Donatus was elected to succeed him. In 313 AD, Donatus was consecrated as Bishop of Carthage and Primate of Africa, emerging as the leader of the movement that would come to be known by its opponents as the Donatist Church.

Caecilian’s supporters appealed to the emperor, who referred the matter to Pope Miltiades, himself of Roman descent and a known traditor.

=== Lateran council ===
Miltiades summoned Caecilian to the Lateran, along with ten bishops from among his accusers and ten from his own communion. He then convened a synod, appointing an additional fifteen Roman bishops, as well as three leading bishops from Gaul: Reticius of Autun, Maternus of Cologne, and Marinus of Arles.

The Lateran Council convened over three days, from October 2 to 4, 313. The proceedings were poorly managed, as Miltiades ruled in favor of Caecilian by default, disregarding testimonies and written evidence that implicated him. This blatant partiality enraged many Christians who supported Donatus' position, who walked out in protest. The council concluded abruptly, with the Bishop of Rome affirming Caecilian’s position as Bishop of Carthage and condemning Donatus’s doctrine of re-baptism for bishops and priests.

The Donatists once again appealed to the emperor, who responded by convening the Council of Arles in 314; however, this council also ruled against them. Despite these adverse judgments, Donatism continued to spread throughout North Africa. It later emerged that Miltiades and his successor, Sylvester I, had both surrendered sacred texts and offered incense to Roman deities, actions that prompted Petilianus, the Donatist bishop of Constantine, to excommunicate them around 400 AD.

== Aftermath ==
During his approximately forty-year tenure, Donatus authored a Gospel in Punic, reportedly inspired by a divine revelation. This text was regarded by his followers as the only Gospel free from Roman tampering. He also expanded the Donatist churches throughout North Africa becoming the defacto the legitimate Primate of Africa. However the Donatists were unable to convince successive councils that Caecilian had been a traditor or that his consecration was invalid due to having been performed by a traditor.

Donatus succeeded in expanding the Donatist churches following the effective removal of Caecilian from office, as he was a figure widely despised, largely due to his association with the unpopular Roman administration, especially among the rural populations of Libyan and Phoenician descent who, like Donatus and his followers, sought to assert their identity and autonomy.

== Donatism after Donatus ==
By the end of Donatus’s tenure, the Donatist Church had emerged as the dominant Christian community in North Africa. However, internal divisions fractured the movement into factions such as the Urbanists, Rogatists, Claudianists, Maximianists, and Agonistici.

Among these, the Agonistici, also known as Circumcellions by outsiders, were zealous Donatists of Punic descent, who were fiercely committed to liberating the Punic people from Roman domination and establishing a Donatist state. They conducted raids against Roman settlers in the interior regions of Carthaginian territory. Their militant attitude and growing successes against Roman authority propelled them to a leadership role within the Donatist movement, prompting outsiders to equate the entire Donatist Church with their violent actions and respond with severe reprisals.

== See also ==
- Donatism

== Sources ==
- Beaver, R. Pierce, “The Donatist Circumcellions”. (Church History, Vol. 4, No.2 June 1935) pp. 123–133.
- Edwards, Mark ed. trans. Optatus: Against the Donatists. Liverpool: Liverpool University Press, 1997.
- Frend, W. H. C., The Donatist Church. Oxford: Clarendon Press, 1971.
- McGrath, Alister E. Reformation Thought, an Introduction. Blackwell Publishing, Third edition: January 1999.
- Gaddis, Michael. There Is No Crime for Those Who Have Christ. Berkeley: University of California Press: 2005. pp. 103 – 130.
- Tilley, Maureen A. trans., Donatist Martyr Stories – The Church in Conflict in Roman North Africa. Liverpool: Liverpool University Press: 1996.
- Tilley, Maureen A., "Dilatory Donatists or Procrastinating Catholics: The Trial at the Conference of Carthage" (Church History, Vol. 60, No.1 Mar. 1991) pp. 11 – 19.
- Donatus & the Donatist Schism. https://earlychurch.org.uk/donatism.php

Religious titles
Preceded by Majorinus	Donatist Bishop of Carthage; 313–347	Succeeded by Parmenian
