= Limata =

Limata was a Roman era city of Byzacena, in Roman North Africa. It was home to the Bishop, Purpurius, one of the founders of Donatist Movement.
