= Notitia provinciarum et civitatum Africae =

Byzantine-era list of bishops and sees

The Notitia provinciarum et civitatum Africae ("Notice of the Provinces and Cities of Africa") is a Byzantine-era document listing the bishops and sees in the Roman provinces of North Africa, Sardinia and the Balearics. The cause of its preparation was the council of Carthage held on 1 February 484 by the Arian king of the Vandals, Huneric (477–484).

It is arranged according to provinces in the following order: Proconsularis, Numidia, Byzacena, Mauretania Caesariensis, Mauretania Sitifensis, Tripolitana and Sardinia. It also names exiled bishops and vacant sees, and is an important authority for the history of the early African church and the geography of these provinces. It is preserved in the sole extant manuscript containing the History of the Vandal Persecution by Bishop Victor of Vita.

== Description ==
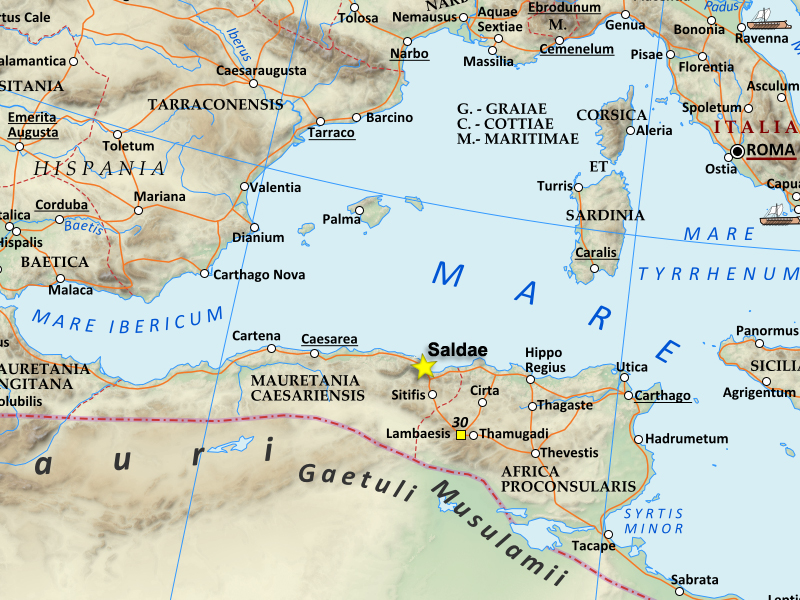
Roman North Africa

The Notitia provinciarum and civitatum Africae is the conventional long title in Latin, but it is also known simply as the Notitia Africae (NA).

The Notitia lists the Chalcedonian (Catholic) bishops (nomina episcorum catholicorum) who participated in the council held at Carthage on 1 February 484, as well as those who were victims of the Vandal Persecution and those who were exiled or fled (fugerunt). It also by implication describes the extent of the Vandal Kingdom at that time.

It lists four hundred and eighty-three dioceses in seven ecclesiastical provinces, five of which correspond to Roman provinces. The order of the provinces seems to follow the chronological order of their creation:

- The first list is the Proconsularis (or Zeugitana), which includes the diocese of Carthage, whose bishop is the primate of Africa.
- The second list is that of Numidia, the first bishop of which, Secundus of Tigisis, is attested in 305.
- The third list is that of Byzacena, which had a bishop by the middle of the 4th century.
- The fourth list is that of Mauretania Caesariensis, the provincial seat of which might go back to the 4th century and the acts of the council of Carthage (407).
- The fifth is a list of Mauretania Sitifensis, which was set up after the general council of Africa held at Hippo on 8 October 393.
- The sixth list is that of Tripolitania.
- Sardinia is not presented as a province but as an island. The list also contains the names of the Bishops of Mallorca and Menorca, in the Balearic Islands.

The author of the Notitia is unknown. It has long been attributed, wrongly, to Victor of Vita, and its author is designated, by convention, as Pseudo-Victor.

== Bishops named in the Notitia ==
- Fulgentius of Ruspe and Stephen
- Tiberiumus
- Paschasius
- Aemilianus
- Amourah
- Athenius of Cercina
- Aurilius of Kelibia
- Benantius of Oppidum Novum
- Collo
- Crescens
- Dantus
- Eugenius of Carthage
- Florentinus
- Fortunatas and Optantius
- Felix
- Fortunatianus of Cillium
- Frumentius
- Honartus of Tlemcen
- Reparatus of Cissi
- Leporis of Azura
- Martialis of Columnata
- Maximus of Cova
- Petrus
- Peregrinus (bishop)
- Pudentius of Madauros, M'Daourouch
- Tacanus of Albulae
- Tiberianus of Quiza
- Rogatus
- Quintian, Lucius and Julian
- Quodvultdeus of Coeliana
- Victor of Pomaria
- Victorian, Frumentius and Companions
- Vadius of Lesvi
- Vitalis of Castra Nova
- Bishop of Beniane, Tipasa, Bonusta, Macri.

== See also ==
- Notitia Dignitatum
- Annuario Pontificio
