= Felix of Aptunga =

Felix, Bishop of Aptunga, in proconsular Africa was a 4th-century churchman, at the center of the Donatist controversy. Felix was one of those who consecrated Caecilian as Bishop of Carthage in 311 A.D. This act led to a major schism in Early North African Christianity.

== Biography ==
Felix of Abthugni, the bishop of Aptunga had escaped arrest during the Diocletian Persecution in 303. He held an administrative office within the town council, and was on friendly relations with the local magistrate who was to implement the persecution. It is therefore probable he was warned of the coming persecution, and was away at the time. The cathedral and some documents were destroyed in his absence.

Felix consecrated Caecilian as Bishop of Carthage in 311. The proto-Donatist in a Council at Cirta called this consecration invalid because of Felix's participation.

However, Felix was considered to have been a traditor during the Diocletian Persecution and as such Caecilian's consecration was not supported by the majority of the Church. Furthermore, Felix should have consulted with Secundus of Tigisis, Primate of Numidia before doing such an act. Secundus and 70 bishops appointed Majorinus in his place, precipitating a schism in the Early North African Christianity that lasted for three centuries.

=== Trial ===
The Donatist faction accused Felix of being a traditor, and the Roman Emperor ordered Aelianus, the proconsul of Africa, to investigate. A hearing took place on February 15, 314 at Carthage. Felix was accused of apostasy by Ingentius, a Donatist, who had been a secretary to one of the city officials in Abthugni during the persecution. He would have known Felix from Aptunga. It is assumed this accusation was retaliatory after Felix had accused Maurus of Utica (a friend of Ingentius) of similar crimes.

On January 19, 314, Felix appeared before the court of Vicar Aelius Paulinus in Carthage to defend himself against his accusers. He was exonerated on February 15 by proconsul Aelianus.

=== Reception ===
Felix was supported by the writers Optatus, Augustine and Eusebius.

== See also ==
- Secundus of Tigisis
