= Caecilianus =

Bishop of Carthage, instrumental in the Donatist schism

Caecilianus, or Caecilian, was archdeacon and then bishop of Carthage in 311 AD. His appointment as bishop led to the Donatist controversy of the Late Roman Empire. He was also one of only five Western bishops at the First Council of Nicea.

== Background to the controversy ==
Caecilianus was an archdeacon of Carthage, who supported his bishop Mensurius in opposing the fanatical cult of martyrdom led by the Circumcellions. Mensurius forbade any to be honoured as martyrs who had given themselves up of their own accord or who had boasted that they possessed copies of the scriptures which they would not relinquish. Some of these he claimed were criminals and debtors to the state, who thought they might by this means rid themselves of a burdensome life, or wipe away the remembrance of their misdeeds, or at least gain money and enjoy in prison the luxuries supplied by the kindness of Christians.

A deacon of Carthage, Felix, was accused of writing a defamatory letter against the emperor Maxentius. Mensurius was said to have concealed his deacon in his house and was summoned to Rome. Mensurius was acquitted but died on his return journey. Before his departure from Africa, he had given the gold and silver ornaments of the church to the care of certain old men and had also consigned an inventory of these effects to an aged woman, who was to deliver it to the next bishop.

On the death of Mensurius (c.311), Caecilianus was nominated as his successor. The religious world of Carthage divided itself broadly into two sections, the moderate and rigoristic parties, or the supporters and opponents of the principles of Caecilianus. At the head of the latter was a devout and wealthy woman named Lucilla, who had been severely rebuked by the archdeacon for superstitious veneration of martyrs' relics.

== Election ==
The rigoristic party wished to fill the vacancy with one of their own followers. Two priests, Botrus and Caelestius, who each expected to be elected, had managed that only a small number of bishops should be present. Caecilian was duly chosen by the whole people, placed in the chair of Mensurius, and consecrated by Bishop Felix of Aptunga. Whether this was in the presence of any Numidian bishops seems uncertain. The old men who had charge of the treasure of the church were obliged to give it up; they joined with Botrus and Caelestius in refusing to acknowledge Caecilian as bishop.

Secundus, primate of Numidia and bishop of Tigisis, was presently invited to Carthage by the rigorist party. He came, attended by 70 bishops, and cited Caecilianus before them. Felix was denounced as a traditor, and consequently it was claimed that any ordination performed by him was invalid. Caecilianus was charged with unnecessary and heartless severity to those who had visited the confessors in prison; he was denounced as a "tyrannus" and a "carnifex" ("butcher".) Caecilian had possession of the basilica and the cathedra of Cyprian, and the people were with him, so that he refused to appear before an assembly so prejudiced; but professed his willingness to satisfy them on all personal matters, and offered, if right was on their side, to lay down his episcopal office, and submit to re-ordination. Secundus and the Numidian bishops answered by excommunicating Caecilianus and his party, and ordaining as bishop the lector Majorinus, a member of Lucilla's household.

== Schism ==
The church of Northern Africa went into schism. The party of Caecilianus broke off from that of Majorinus, and the Christian world was scandalized by fulminations, excommunications, invectives, charges and countercharges. Both parties confidently anticipated the support of the state; but Constantine, who was then in Gaul, took the side of the Caecilianus. In his largesse to the Christians of the province, and in his edicts favourable to the church there, he expressly stipulated that the party of Majorinus should be excluded: their views were, in his opinion, the "madness" of men of "unsound mind." The rigoristic party appealed to the justice of the emperor and courted full inquiry to be conducted in Gaul. Constantine referred the matter to Miltiades, the bishop of Rome.

== Council in Rome ==
Miltiades was a native of Africa and a Roman citizen. Miltiades, unwilling to jeopardise his relationship with the emperor but also unwilling to preside over a council with an uncertain outcome, changed the proceedings into a regular church synod and appointed 15 Italian bishops, above the three Gallic bishops recommended by the emperor.

The Council in Rome was held for three days from 2–4 October 313. Each side appeared with 10 bishops; Donatus Magnus, bishop of Casae Nigrae in Numidia, headed the party of Majorinus. The process was modeled on Roman civil proceedings, with Miltiades insisting on strict rules of evidence and argument. This frustrated the Donatists who left the council without presenting their case, which led Miltiades to rule in favour of Caecilianus by default. The council thus ended after only three sessions. The pope retained Caecilianus as bishop of Carthage and condemned Donatus' teachings. The Donatists again appealed to the emperor, who responded by convening the Council of Arles.

== Council of Arles ==
Constantine convened a Council of Arles in 314 A.D. Jurists went to Carthage, collected documents, tabulated the statements of witnesses, and laid their report before the bishops assembled. The council, presided over by Marinus, bishop of Arles, was composed of about 200 persons. Between 40 and 50 episcopal sees were represented at the council by bishops or proxies; the bishops of London, York, and Lincoln were there. Pope Sylvester I sent legates.

It confirmed the findings of the Council of Rome and recognized the validity of the election of Caecilian of Carthage, and confirmed the excommunication of Donatus of Casae Nigrae. The charge raised against his consecrator, Felix, was proved baseless. It was the most important ecclesiastical assembly the Christian world had yet seen, and its decisions were of permanent significance to the church. Its 22 canons dealing with various abuses that had crept into ecclesiastical life since the Diocletian Persecution are among the most important documents of early ecclesiastical legislation.

== Decision confirmed at Milan ==
The temper displayed by the victors was not calculated to soothe the conquered, and an appeal was at once made from the council to the emperor. Constantine was irritated, but after some delay he ordered the discussion of the question before himself personally. This occurred at Milan in 316. The emperor confirmed the previous decisions of Rome and Arles, and he followed up his judgment by laws and edicts confiscating the goods of the party of Majorinus, depriving them of their churches and threatening to punish their rebellion with death.

== After Milan ==
From this time the schism of the Northern African church lost its purely personal aspect, and became a stern religious contest on questions of discipline.
