= Reticius =

Bishop and writer

Saint Reticius

Bishop
- Died: ~334 AD
- Venerated in: Roman Catholic Church
- Canonized: Pre-Congregation
- Major shrine: Autun Cathedral
- Feast: May 15

Saint Reticius (or Rheticus, Rheticius) (French: Saint Rhétice) (early 4th century) was a bishop of Autun, the first one known to history, according to the Catholic Encyclopedia. He was a Gallo-Roman, and an ecclesiastical writer, and served as bishop of this see from around 310 to 334 AD.

He traveled on behalf of Emperor Constantine the Great in 313 to the Synod of Rome and in 314 to the Synod of Arles, in order to bring about a resolution to the dispute with the Donatists.

Gregory of Tours praised Reticius in his writings. Saint Jerome mentions Reticius in his De Viris Illustribus, claiming he "had a great reputation in Gaul in the reign of Constantine." He read Reticius On the Song of Songs.

Reticius was succeeded by Cassian of Autun, also venerated as a saint.
