= Mensurius =

Mensurius was a bishop of Carthage in the early 4th century during the early Christian Church.

During the Christian persecution of Diocletian he evaded turning over sacred scriptures to the Roman authorities, but was nevertheless considered a traditor by Donatists. He was accused of "countenancing" the Traditors.

In a letter to Secundus, Bishop of Tigisis, then the senior bishop of Numidia, he explains that he had himself had taken the texts from the church to his own house, and had substituted them for a number of heretical writings, which the authorities had seized without asking for more. But the proconsul, when informed of the deception refused to search the bishop's private house.

Secundus, in his reply, without blaming Mensurius, somewhat pointedly praised the martyrs who in his own province had been tortured and put to death for refusing to deliver up the Scriptures and that he himself had replied to the officials who came to search: "I am a Christian and a bishop, not a traditor." Some such as Petilian even considered him a thurificator.

Mensurius also forbade any to be honoured as martyrs who had given themselves up of their own accord, or who had boasted that they possessed copies of the scriptures which they would not relinquish. Some of these he claimed were criminals and debtors to the state, who thought they might by this means rid themselves of a burdensome life, or else wipe away the remembrance of their misdeeds, or at least gain money and enjoy in prison the luxuries supplied by the kindness of Christians.

In 308, Mensuris hid the deacon Felix who was accused of slander against the Emperor and defended him in Rome. After the acquittal he could not return to Carthage due to the blockade by Maxentius. His death outside of Africa and rejection of his successor Caecilianus contributed to the Donatists schisms in Northern Africa.
