= Synod of Rome (313) =

The synod of Rome (or council of Rome) of AD 313 was a synod of the Christian church convoked by the Roman emperor Constantine I and held under the presidency of Bishop Miltiades of Rome. The cause of the synod was a letter Constantine received from the governor of Africa, Gaius Annius Anullinus, in April, detailing the complaints of the Donatists and the dispute over the bishopric of Carthage. From Gaul, the emperor wrote to the bishop of Rome asking him to hear the Donatists' case. He also appointed three bishops from Gaul to assist the bishop of Rome, since these were acceptable to the Donatists, Gaul have largely escaped the most recent Christian persecutions. Constantine's intention was probably that Miltiades hold an informal arbitration.

Relying on precedent from the reign of Aurelian, Miltiades turned the arbitration into a council. To the three Gallic bishops he added fifteen from Italy and he insisted on following Roman legal procedures. The council met on Friday, 2 October 313, in the house of Fausta in the Lateran. They held a total of three sessions. During the sessions the Donatists failed to produce documents to back up their claims. On 4 October, the nineteen assembled bishops declared Donatus guilty of rebaptizing Christians and of laying hands on bishops and permitted his rival, Caecilian, to continue as bishop of Carthage.

Accounts of the council of Rome of 313 are preserved in Optatus' Against the Donatists, in the letters of Augustine of Hippo and in the acts of the Council of Carthage (411). Constantine's letter to Miltiades is also found in the Ecclesiastical History of Eusebius of Caesarea. The full acts of the council have not been preserved, but the final words of the verdict pronounced by Miltiades are quoted by Optatus:

Since it is patent that Caecilian has not been accused in respect of his calling by those who came with Donatus, and it is patent that he has not been convicted in any regard by Donatus, I judge that he should continue to be held in good standing by his ecclesiastical communion.

Constantine was displeased with Miltiades' actions, since his instructions had expressly stated that "I do not wish you to leave schism or division of any kind anywhere." He convoked the Council of Arles (314) to correct what he saw as Miltiades' mistakes, but the result was still the condemnation of the Donatists.

== Attendees ==
The three bishops from Gaul, sees unspecified, are named Maternus, Reticius and Marinus by Optatus.

The Italian bishops in attendance, according to Optatus, were:

- Merocles, bishop of Milan
- Florianus, bishop of Siena
- Zoticus, bishop of Quintianum near Tarquinia
- Stennius, bishop of Rimini
- Felix, bishop of Florence
- Gaudentius, bishop of Pisa
- Constantius, bishop of Faenza
- Proterius, bishop of Capua
- Theophilus, bishop of Benevento
- Sabinus, bishop of Terracina
- Secundus, bishop of Palestrina
- Felix, bishop of Tres Tabernae
- Maximus, bishop of Ostia
- Evandrus, bishop of Ursinum (probably Urbino)
- Donatianus, bishop of Forum Claudii

== Works cited ==
- Drake, H. A. (2021). "The Elephant in the Roome: Constantine at the Council". In Kim, Young Richard (ed.). The Cambridge Companion to the Council of Nicaea. Cambridge: Cambridge University Press. pp. 111–132.
- Edwards, Mark, ed. (1997). Optatus: Against the Donatists. Liverpool University Press.
- Maier, Jean-Louis, ed. (1987). Le dossier du Donatisme. Vol. 1. Berlin: Akademie Verlag.
