= Cassian of Autun =

4th-century bishop of Autun

Saint Cassian of Autun

Bishop
- Died: ~350 AD
- Venerated in: Roman Catholic Church
- Feast: August 5

Saint Cassian of Autun (French: Cassien) (died c. 350 AD) was a 4th-century bishop of Autun. He may have been an Egyptian by birth. He traveled to Autun and was a follower of Saint Reticius, bishop of Autun.

Cassian succeeded Reticius as bishop, serving for about twenty years, and was well liked by the people of his see. Gregory of Tours attributes miracles to Cassian.

After the peace bought by Constantine he had a vision and decided to embark with some companions to evangelize the Britons. Getting as far as Autun, he became the assistant of Saint Rhétice Autun.

On the death of Rhétice, he was elected bishop. he pursued the evangelization of Éduens and held the office for twenty years of episcopate. He was buried in St. Peter. Gregory of Tours, who came to Autun two centuries after his death, said he saw a great veneration on his tomb. The grave stone dust was reputed to cure all ills.

The abbot of Saint-Quentin in Vermandois wishing to obtain the relics of the saint who was in great miracles made the request to Modon bishop of Autun. He obtained the precious relic, and the body was taken to his monastery around the year 820. Charles the Bald restored the reliquary with a magnificent reliquary stored in the crypt of the Basilica of Saint-Quentin.

Highly revered in the Middle Ages, there were many celebrations of this saint, 1 January, February 9, 2 May, July 16, November 14, many dates of events in his life, like his arrival in Autun, his ordination and the various dates translations of his reliques.

Often confused with other Cassian, is the patron saint of the Church of Savigny-lès-Beaune since 1443, he is also the patron saint of three villages in Burgundy (Côte d'Or): Athie, Ecutigny and Veilly.
