= Majorinus =

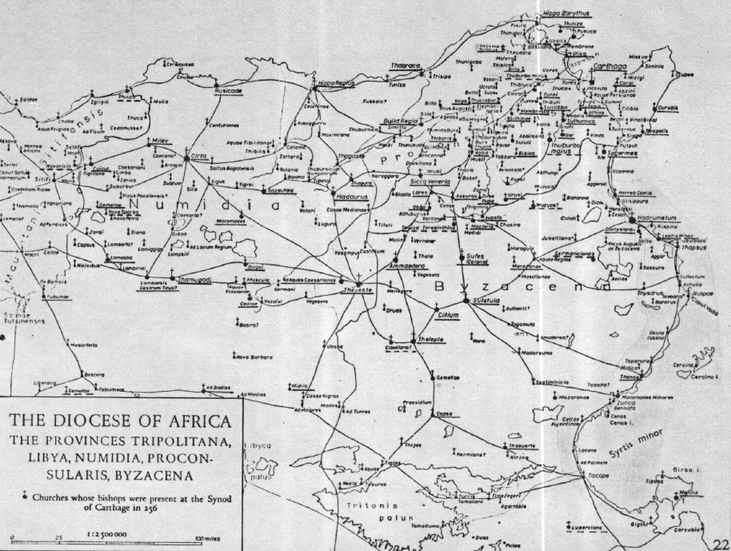
Dioceses of Africa, 256

Majorinus was the leader of a schismatic Christian sect in Roman North Africa known as the Donatists.

== Life ==
Very little is known of his early life, as Donatist writings were mostly destroyed in the following years. What we can garner of his life and beliefs is accessed through what his enemies said against him. He had been a reader or a lector in the church at Carthage, during the time that Caecilianus had been an archdeacon and Mensurius was bishop. He seems to have also had some domestic office in the household of a Roman noblewoman Lucilla.

In 311 Majorinus was chosen as bishop of Carthage by a council of 70 bishops in Cirta led by Secundus of Tigisis. Secundus was the primate of Numidia and as such was meant to be consulted prior to the appointment of Caecilianus, and this appointment was intended to depose Caecilianus. Caecilianus had been the understudy of the recently deceased Bishop Mensurius considered by many to be a traditor during the Diocletianic Persecution, though Mensurius denied the charges, saying instead that he had hidden Christians and church property. The council, however, held that Mensurius was traditor and that sacraments administered by Caecilianus were thus invalid. The situation was further complicated by the fact that Caecilianus was consecrated by Felix of Aptunga, another traditor. However rather than depose Caecilianus, his appointment created a 300-year-long schism in North African Christendom that would radically shape the intellectual life of Christianity.

== Opponents ==
Virtually everything we know of Majorinus comes from his enemies, many of whom did not hold back on their condemnation of him.

=== Optatus ===
Optatus claims that a dispute broke out between Lucilla—a woman of high rank and the deacon Caecilianus—who had reprimanded her for touching a relic of a saint. The offence, he claims, had festered and at the accession to the bishopric of Caecilianus, Lucilla joined with the Council of Bishops who Optatus called antichrists and betrayers. he concluded ....the Schism was brought to birth by the anger of a disgraced woman, was fed by ambition, and received its strength from avarice He describes Majorinus:

"Majorinus, a member of the household of Lucilla----at her instigation, and through her bribes----was consecrated Bishop by Betrayers, who in the Numidian Council had (as we have already said) acknowledged their crimes and granted pardon to one another. It is, therefore, clear that both the Betrayers who consecrated, and Majorinus who was consecrated, went forth from the Church."

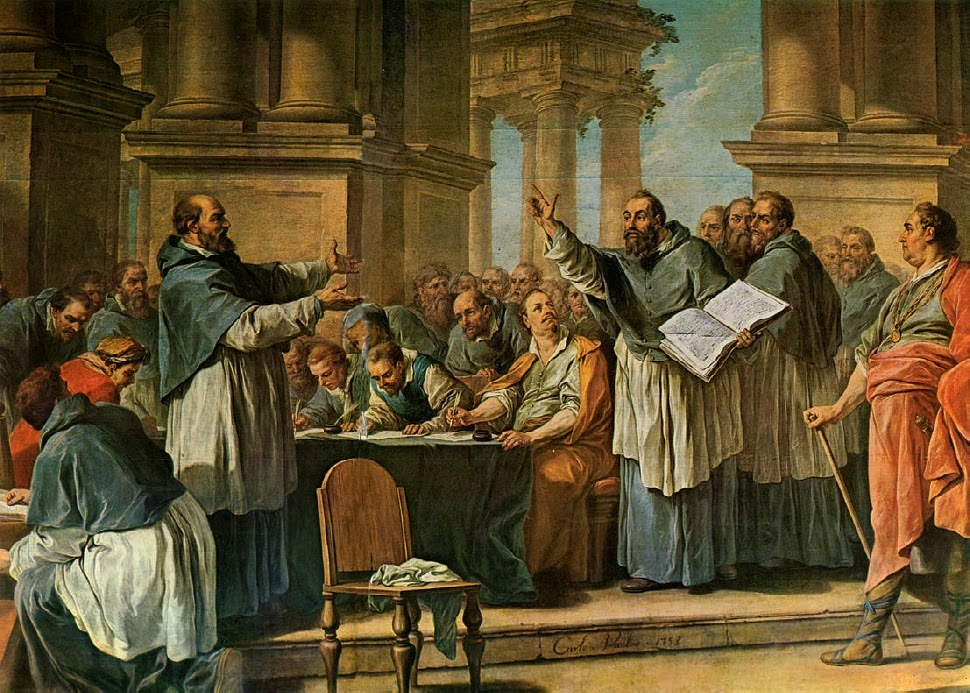
Augustine and donatists.

=== Eusebius ===
In Church History Eusebius continues the story of the bribes.

=== Augustine ===
Augustine was scathing of Majorinus His elevation to bishop was a Wicked Crime of Frenzied Discord For Augustine the chief evil of Majorinus was his schism with the Church. He wrote of the Donatists in an epistle:

"It is better indeed that men should be brought to serve God by instruction than by fear of punishment or by pain. But because the former means are better, the latter must not therefore be neglected.... Many must often be brought back to their Lord, like wicked servants, by the rod of temporal suffering before they attain the highest grade of religious development...."

== Significance ==
Although he was the first leader of the Donatists church, a significant event in the Early African Church and resulting in the formation of doctrinal authodoxy for the Catholic portion of the church, Majorinus seems to have been little more than a puppet for the rigorists. He had been a fairly low ranking clergy thrust into the dispute that had been raging for some time. This, a lack of theological output, and the relatively short tenure of his leadership had reduced his actual impact on history.
