= Optatus =

4th-century Christian theologian and priest

Saint Optatus of Milevis
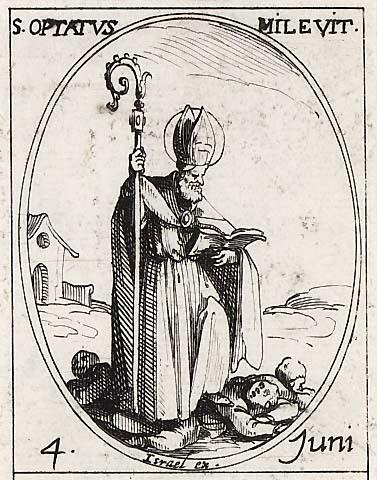

Church Father, Bishop of Melevis
- Died: c. 387
- Venerated in: Eastern Orthodox Church; Roman Catholic Church
- Feast: 4 June

Optatus, sometimes anglicized as Optate, was Bishop of Milevis, in Numidia, in the fourth century, remembered for his writings against Donatism.

== Biography and context ==
Augustine of Hippo suggests that Optatus was a convert: "Do we not see with how great a booty of gold and silver and garments Cyprian, doctor suavissimus, came forth out of Egypt, and likewise Lactantius, Victorinus, Optatus, Hilary?" (De doctrina Christiana, xl).

His (untitled) work against the Donatists is an answer to Parmenianus, the successor of Donatus in the primatial see of Carthage. According to Jerome (De viris illustribus, # 110), it was in six books and was written under Valens and Valentinian I (364-75). Seven books are now known, and the list of popes is carried as far as Siricius (384-98). Similarly the Donatist succession of antipopes is given (II, IV), as Victor, Bonifatius, Encolpius, Macrobius, Lucianus, Claudianus (the date of the last is about 380), though a few sentences earlier Macrobius is mentioned as the actual bishop.

The plan of the work is laid down in Book I, and is completed in six books. It seems, then, that the seventh book, which Jerome did not know in 392, was an appendix to a new edition in which Optatus made additions to the two episcopal lists. The date of the original work is fixed by the statement in I, xiii, that sixty years and more had passed since the persecution of Diocletian (303-5). Photinus (d. 376) is apparently regarded as still alive; Julian is dead (363). Thus the first books were published about 366–70, and the second edition about 385–90.

He died around 387.

== Doctrine ==
In his writings on the conflict between Christians and Donatists, Optatus is notably mild among Church Fathers in his views against schism. Optatus distinguishes between schismatics and heretics, saying that the former have rejected unity, but have true doctrine and true sacraments, and that therefore Parmenian should not have threatened them with eternal damnation.

Donatists and Christians were agreed as to the necessary unity of the church. The question was, where is this one church? Optatus argues that it cannot be only in a corner of Africa; it must be the catholica (the word is used as a substantive) which is throughout the world. Parmenian had enumerated six dotes, or properties, of the church, of which Optatus accepts five, and argues that the first, the cathedra (episcopal chair) belongs to the Christians, and therefore they have all the others.

The whole schism has arisen through the quarrel as to the episcopal succession at Carthage, and it might have been expected that Optatus would claim this property of cathedra by pointing out the legitimacy of the Christian succession at Carthage. But he does not. He replies: "We must examine who sat first in the chair, and where... You cannot deny that you know that in the city of Rome upon Peter first the chair of the bishop was conferred, in which sat the head of all the Apostles, Peter, whence also he was called Cephas, in which one chair unity should be preserved by all, lest the other Apostles should each stand up for his own chair, so that now he should be a schismatic and a sinner who should against this one chair set up another. Therefore in the one chair, which is the first of the dotes Peter first sat, to whom succeeded Linus." An incorrect list of popes follows, ending with, "and to Damasus Siricius, who is to-day our colleague, with whom the whole world with us agrees by the communication of commendatory letters in the fellowship of one communion. Tell us the origin of your chair, you who wish to claim the holy Church for yourselves". Optatus then mocks at the recent succession of Donatist antipopes at Rome.

Optatus argues, especially in book V, against the doctrine which the Donatists had inherited from Cyprian that baptism by those outside the church cannot be valid, and he anticipates Augustine's argument that the faith of the baptizer does not matter, since it is God who confers the grace. His statement of the objective efficacy of the sacraments ex opere operato is well known: "Sacramenta per se esse sancta, non per homines" (V, iv). Thus in baptism there must be the Holy Trinity, the believer and the minister, and their importance is in this order, the third being the least important. In rebuking the Donatists as sacrilegious, he says: "What is so profane as to break, scrape, remove the altars of God, on which you yourselves had once offered, on which both the prayers of the people and the members of Christ have been borne, where God Almighty has been invoked, where the Holy Ghost has been asked for and has come down, from which by many has been received the pledge of eternal salvation and the safeguard of faith and the hope of resurrection? ... For what is an altar but the seat of the Body and Blood of Christ?"

In book VII, Optatus argues that returning Donatists should be accepted into the church for the sake of charity and unity. As precedent, he cites the biblical episode of Peter's denial of Jesus, arguing that the other apostles did not separate from Peter after his sin.

An appendix contained an important dossier of documents which had apparently been collected by some Christian controversialist between 330 and 347. This collection was already mutilated when it was copied by the scribe of the only manuscript which has preserved it, and that manuscript is incomplete; citations from Augustine and from Optatus himself give some indication of what has been lost.

== Veneration ==
Optatus has apparently never received any ecclesiastical cultus; but his name was inserted in the Roman Martyrology on 4 June, though it is quite unknown to all the ancient martyrologies and calendars. He is also venerated in the Eastern Orthodox Church on the same date.

== The Constantinian Letters in the Appendix of Against the Donatists ==
Included after the main body of Optatus' work - originally untitled, now often referred to as Against the Donatists - is an appendix consisting of ten official documents relating to the Donatist Schism. Six of these (nos. 3, 5, 6, 7, 9, and 10) claim to be letters written by Constantine and are addressed to various actors involved in the Donatist Schism, including local officials (nos. 3 and 7), 'Catholic' - i.e. anti-Donatist - bishops (nos. 5, 9 and 10) and one (no. 6) to Donatist bishops. The letters thus show the personal involvement of the Roman emperor in the Donatist controversy between 312/313 and 330 AD.

Their authenticity, as well as that of the other four documents, has been the source of scholarly debate since the nineteenth century, though they are now generally seen as authentic. The authenticity of some or all documents has been challenged by scholars such as Otto Seeck (1889), Pierre Batiffol (1914), William Hugh Clifford Frend (1952), and Heinz Kraft (1955). Meanwhile, the authenticity of some or all documents has been defended by Louis Duchesne (1890), Norman Hepburn Baynes (1925/1931), H. Chadwick (1954), and Charles Odahl (1993). The authenticity of the documents has often been challenged on the basis of supposed anachronisms in the texts. Pierre Batiffol, for example, rejected Constantian authorship for Appendix 5 because of its use of specifically Christian formulas and Christian doctrines that he felt Constantine would not have used. Batiffol's view has been challenged by Charles Odahl (1993).

M.W. Edwards has argued that the appendix was not edited by Optatus himself, but seems to have compiled by an African belonging to the 'Catholic' party. First, Appendix 5 was composed during the aftermath of the Council of Arles (314), and not during the preparation for the Council of Rome (313), as Optatus suggests. Second, two documents mentioned by Optatus - the epistle of the Donatists to Constantine, cited at I.22, and "the protocol of Cirta", to which Optatus alludes at I.14 - are not included in the appendix. Since the documents mostly involve letters of official correspondence between Emperor Constantine and persons holding authority in Africa and Numidia, or letters written in these provinces and under the supervision of local magistrates, Edwards suggests that "Our archivist [i.e. the compiler of the appendix] would therefore seem to have been an African of the 'Catholic' party, who had access to public records in his own country, but did not hold any commerce with the Donatists or take pains in gathering evidence overseas."

== Sources ==
- Quick links to the separate books and parts of ‘Against the Donatists’, in a 1917 translation. www.tertullian.org.
- The editio princeps was by Cochlæus (Mainz, 1549). More manuscripts were used by Balduinus (Paris, 1563 and 1569), whose text was frequently reprinted in the seventeenth century. Louis-Ellies Dupin's edition includes a history of the Donatists and a geography of Africa (Paris 1700--); it is reprinted in Gallandi and in Migne (Patrologia Latina, XI). The best edition is that of Ziwza (CSEL, XXVI, Vienna, 1893), with description of the manuscripts.
- Donatism. Online Dynamic Bibliography.
- Mireille Labrousse, Sources Chrétiennes 412, 413
- Hermann Sieben, Fontes Christiani 56, 2013
