= Primate of Africa =

The Primate of Africa is an honorific title in the Catholic Church, but in early Christianity was granted to the leading bishop (primas) in Africa. There were at times primates in Numidia and Byzacena, and Donatist claimants, but generally the role of the Bishop of Carthage was seen as preeminent. Similar titles were used by the Patriarchs of Alexandria.

== History ==
In the 3rd century, at the time of Cyprian, the Bishop of Carthage exercised a real though not formalized primacy in the Early African Church, not only in the Roman province of Proconsular Africa in the broadest sense (even when divided into three provinces including Byzacena and Tripolitania) but also, in some supra-metropolitan form, over the Church in Numidia and Mauretania. The provincial primacy was associated with the senior bishop in the province rather than with a particular see and was of little importance in comparison to the authority of the bishop of Carthage, who could be appealed to directly by the clergy of any province.

Pope Leo confirmed the primacy of the Bishop of Carthage in 446 when he wrote: "Indeed, after the Roman Bishop, the leading bishop and metropolitan for all Africa is the Bishop of Carthage."

At the beginning of the 8th century and at the end of the 9th century, the Patriarch of Alexandria claimed jurisdiction over Carthage, however in 1053 Pope Leo IV confirmed the primacy of Carthage and twenty years later Pope Gregory VII reiterated Leo's statement. The Greek Orthodox Patriarchate of Alexandria is officially called "Patriarchate of Alexandria and all Africa".

Today the Archdiocese of Carthage and Primate of Africa has been incorporated into the Archdiocese of Tunis. The title of primate was applied to the Archbishop of Carthage and Tunis for a time from 1894 until Tunisian independence in 1964.

== See also ==
- Roman Catholic Archdiocese of Tunis
