= Circumcellions =

4th-century Christian group

The Circumcellions, or Agonistici (as called by Donatists), were bands of Roman Christian radicals in North Africa in the early to mid-4th century. They were initially concerned with remedying social grievances. They condemned poverty and slavery and advocated canceling debt and freeing slaves. The term "Circumcellions" may have been coined by critics who referred to them as "circum cellas euntes" (they go around larders) because "they roved about among the peasants, living on those they sought to indoctrinate."

== Background ==
The Circumcellions first appeared about 317 and were active primarily in Numidia and Mauretania Sitifensis. They promoted ideas of social reform along with eschatological hopes. Bishop Optatus of Milevis says that around 340 they started an uprising directed at creditors and slave owners. They regarded as martyrs those among them killed when the disturbance was put down. Augustine of Hippo likened them to a rustic mob encouraging violence against landlords.

They regarded martyrdom as the true Christian virtue and thus disagreed with the Episcopal see of Carthage on the primacy of chastity, sobriety, humility, and charity. Instead, they focused on bringing about their own martyrdom. On occasion, members assaulted Roman legionaries or armed travelers with simple wooden clubs to provoke them into attacking and martyring them. Others interrupted courts of law and verbally provoked the judge so that he would order their immediate execution (a normal punishment at the time for contempt of court).

== Views ==
Because it is written in the Gospel of John that Jesus had told Peter to put down his sword at Gethsemane (John 18:11), the Circumcellions avoided bladed weapons and used clubs, which they called "Israelites". Using their "Israelites", the Circumcellions would attack random travelers on the road while shouting "Laudate Deum!" ("Praise God!" in Latin). The motive behind these random beatings was to provoke the victims into killing them so they would die a martyr's death.

They preferred to be known as agonistici ("fighters" for Christ).

== In popular culture ==
In Umberto Eco's Baudolino (2000), the law of the Deacon of Pndapetzim is enforced by Circumcellion Nubian (Nubians) guards.

== See also ==
- Agon
