= Traditors =

Term used during Roman persecution of Christians

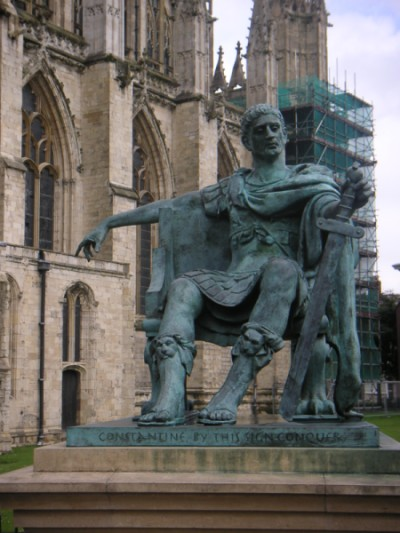
Sculpture of Constantine I in York, England.

Traditor, plural: traditores (Latin), is a term meaning "the one(s) who had handed over" and defined by Merriam-Webster as "one of the Christians giving up to the officers of the law the Scriptures, the sacred vessels, or the names of their brethren during the Roman persecutions". The word traditor comes from the Latin transditio from trans (across) + dare (to hand, to give), and is the source of the modern English words traitor and treason. The same root word, with a different context of what is handed to whom, gives the word tradition as well.

In the history of the Christian church, it refers to bishops and other Christians who turned over sacred scriptures or betrayed their fellow Christians to the Roman authorities under threat of persecution. During the Diocletianic Persecution between AD 303 and 305, many church leaders had gone as far as turning in Christians to the authorities and "handed over" sacred religious texts to authorities to be burned. Philip Schaff says about them: "In this, as in former persecutions, the number of apostates who preferred the earthly life to the heavenly, was very great. To these was now added also the new class of the traditores, who delivered the holy Scriptures to the heathen authorities, to be burned".

Some church members easily forgave the traditors, but the Donatists demanded clear signs of penance. They proclaimed that any sacraments celebrated by priests and bishops who did not perform full penance were invalid. The Donatist sect developed particularly in North Africa, where they accused Bishop Felix of Aptunga of having been a traditor. As the bishop had consecrated Caecilian bishop of Carthage, they held that the consecration was invalid and ordained an alternate bishop, Majorinus.

This caused a schism as some cities had two bishops; one in communion with Caecilian and the other loyal to Majorinus. The matter was taken up in 313 at a synod in Rome, where the Donatists failed to prove that Bishop Felix was a traditor. The synod ruled in favor of Caecilian. The Donatists appealed to Emperor Constantine who in 314 convened the Council of Arles. The issue was debated, and the decision went against the Donatists. The Donatists refused to accept the decision of the council. Their "distaste for bishops who had collaborated" with Rome came out of their broader view of the empire.

Held out as a counterexample to the traditors was the venerated Saint Vincent of Saragossa who preferred to suffer martyrdom rather than agree to consign Scripture to the fire. He is depicted in religious paintings holding the book whose preservation he preferred to his own life.

== See also ==
- Circumcellions, also called Agonistici
- Novatianism
