= Pope Miltiades =

Head of the Catholic Church from 311 to 314

Pope Saint Miltiades
- Bishop of Rome
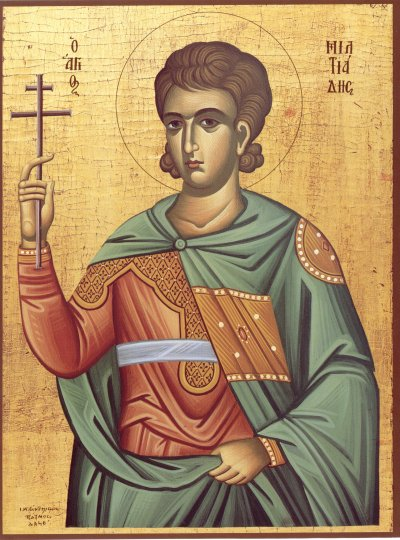
- Icon of Pope Miltiades
- Church: Catholic Church
- Papacy began: 2 July 311
- Papacy ended: 10 or 11 January 314
- Predecessor: Eusebius
- Successor: Sylvester I

Personal details
- Born: Unknown date Roman Africa, Roman Empire
- Died: 10 or 11 January 314 Rome, Italy, Roman Empire
- Buried: Catacomb of Callixtus, Appian Way, Rome, Italy
- Denomination: Christian

Sainthood
- Feast day: 10 December
- Venerated in: Catholic Church Eastern Orthodox Church Anglican Communion Oriental Orthodox Churches Anglicanism Lutheranism

Pope Miltiades (Ancient Greek: Μιλτιάδης, Miltiádēs), also known as Melchiades the African (Μελχιάδης ὁ Ἀφρικανός Melkhiádēs ho Aphrikanós), was the bishop of Rome from 311 to his death on 10 or 11 January 314. It was during his pontificate that Emperor Constantine the Great issued the Edict of Milan (313), giving Christianity legal status within the Roman Empire. The pope also received the palace of Empress Fausta where the Lateran Palace, the papal seat and residence of the papal administration, would be built. At the Lateran Council, during the schism with the Church of Carthage, Miltiades condemned the rebaptism of apostatised bishops and priests, a teaching of Donatus Magnus.

== Background ==
The year of Miltiades' birth is unknown. Still, it is known that he was of North African descent and, according to the Liber Pontificalis, compiled from the 5th century onwards, a Roman citizen. He was born in the present day North Africa, the Roman province of Africa. Miltiades and his successor, Sylvester I, were part of the clergy of Pope Marcellinus. It has been suggested that he was party to the alleged apostasy of Pope Marcellinus, which was repudiated by Augustine of Hippo. This view originated from letters, dated to between 400 and 410, written by Donatist Bishop Petilianus of Constantine, who claimed that Marcellinus, along with Miltiades and Sylvester, surrendered sacred texts and offered incense to Roman deities.

== Pontificate ==
In April 311, the Edict of Toleration was issued in Serdica (modern-day Sofia, Bulgaria) by the Roman emperor Galerius, officially ending the Diocletianic Persecution of Christianity in the Eastern part of the Empire.

The election of Miltiades to the papacy on 2 July 311, according to the Liberian Catalogue, marked the end of a sede vacante, the vacancy of the papacy, following the death of Pope Eusebius on 17 August 310 or 309 according to Liber Pontificalis not long after his exile to Sicily by the Emperor Maxentius. After his election, Church property that was confiscated during the Diocletianic Persecution was restored by Maxentius. This order, however, probably did not extend to all of the parts of Maxentius' jurisdiction.

The Liber Pontificalis, attributed the introduction of several later customs to Miltiades, such as not fasting on Thursdays or Sundays. However, subsequent scholarship now believes the customs likely pre-dated Miltiades. Miltiades prescribed the distribution of portions of the bread consecrated by the pope at all of the churches around Rome, the fermentum, as a sign of unity.

In October 312, Constantine defeated Maxentius at the Battle of the Milvian Bridge to become emperor. He later presented the pope with the palace of Empress Fausta, where the Lateran Palace, the papal residence and seat of central Church administration, would be built.

Being the first pope under Constantine, his pontificate coincided with Constantine's peace to the Church. In February 313, Constantine and Licinius, emperor of the eastern part of the Roman Empire, agreed to extend tolerance of Christianity to Licinius' territory, proclaimed by the Edict of Milan. Consequently, Christians not only attained the freedom of worship but also restored all places of Christian worship and were returned all confiscated property.

=== Lateran Council ===
During Miltiades' tenure as pontiff, a schism over the election of Bishop Caecilianus split the Church of Carthage. The opposing parties were supporters of Caecilianus, who was supported by Rome, and those of Donatus. The latter were mainly clergymen from North Africa who demanded that schismatics and heretics be re-baptised and re-ordained before taking office, the central issue dividing Donatists and Catholics. The supporters of Donatus appealed to Constantine and requested that judges from Gaul be assigned to adjudicate. Constantine agreed, and commissioned Miltiades with three Gallic bishops to resolve the dispute, the first time an emperor interfered in church affairs. Miltiades, unwilling to risk his relationship with the emperor but also unwilling to preside over a council with an uncertain outcome, changed the proceedings into a regular church synod and appointed an additional 15 Italian bishops.

The Lateran Council was held over three days, from 2–4 October 313. The process was modelled on Roman civil proceedings, with Miltiades insisting on strict rules of evidence and argument. This frustrated the Donatists, who left the council without presenting their case, which led Miltiades to rule for Caecilianus by default. The council thus ended after only three sessions. The pope retained Caecilianus as bishop of Carthage and condemned Donatus' teachings of rebaptism of bishops and priests. The adverse rulings failed to stop the continuing spread of Donatism across North Africa.

The Donatists again appealed to the emperor, who responded by convening the Council of Arles in 314, but it ruled against the Donatists too. By the time the council was convened, Miltiades had died on 10 or 11 January 314. He was succeeded by Sylvester I. He was buried in the Catacomb of Callixtus at the Appian Way and venerated as a saint. Licinius, who promulgated the Edict of Milan, violated the edict in 320 by persecuting Christians, sacking them from public offices, forbidding synods, and condoning executions. A civil war broke out between him and Constantine, with Constantine eventually defeating him in 324.

== Veneration ==
The feast of Miltiades in the 4th century, according to the Martyrologium Hieronymianum, was celebrated on 10 January. In the 13th century, the feast of Saint Melchiades (as he was then called) was included, with the mistaken qualification of "martyr", in the General Roman Calendar for celebration on 10 December. In 1969, the celebration was removed from that calendar of obligatory liturgical celebrations, and moved to the day of his death, 10 January, with his name given in the form "Miltiades" but without the indication "martyr".

== See also ==
- List of Catholic saints
- List of popes

== Footnotes ==
Titles of the Great Christian Church
Preceded by Eusebius	Pope; 311–314	Succeeded by Sylvester I
