= Tigisis in Numidia =

Tigisis
- Location within Algeria
- 36°06′38″N 06°56′48″E
- Type: Settlement
- Periods: Roman Empire
- Location: Aïn el-Bordj, Oum el Bouaghi Province, Algeria

Site notes
- Condition: In ruins

Tigisis, also known as Tigisis in Numidia to distinguish it from another Tigisis in Mauretania, was an ancient fortified town of North Africa near what is now Aïn el-Bordj, Algeria. It was near Lambese and Thamagada.

== History ==
Under the Roman Empire, Tigisis was a colony in the province of Numidia.

The account in Procopius's History of the Vandal War of an ancient Punic inscription near the town, which read "We fled here from the face of Joshua the Robber, son of Nun", could be the earliest reference to its national identity.

The emperor Justinian had Tigisis fortified with a wall and fourteen towers. Known as Tījis during the Islamic Middle Ages, the city was captured by a Kutama Berber force led by Abu Abdallah al-Shi'i in the winter of 907–908, during the latter's campaign against the Aghlabid emir in Kairouan. Proceeding eastward along the northern of the two main Roman roads to Kairouan, Abu Abdallah's army laid siege to Tijis and eventually got the 500-strong Aghlabid garrison to surrender in exchange for safe passage.

Tijis was later involved in the founding of the Hammadid dynasty: in 1014, the Zirid emir Badis ibn Mansur designated his son al-Mansur as the crown prince and heir to the throne. Attempting to create a principality for al-Mansur, Badis demanded that his governor Hammad ibn Buluggin hand over the cities of Tijis and Constantine. Hammad refused and declared independence by changing the sovereign's name mentioned in the khutba from that of the Fatimid caliph in Cairo to that of the Sunni Abbasid caliph in Baghdad.

== Diocese ==
The town of Tigisis was the seat of a bishopric during the Roman, Vandal, and Byzantine eras. The persecution under Diocletian appears to have reached its height in Tigisis during February 304.

Although the diocese ceased to function in the early 7th century, a titular continuation (Latin: Tigistanus in Numidia; Italian: Tigisi di Numidia) was established by the Roman Catholic Church in 1933.

=== Bishops ===
==== Ancient diocese ====
- Secundus of Tigisis (fl. 303–312), Donatist Primate of Numidia.
- Gaudentius (fl. 411), Donastist
- Domnicosus (fl. 484), Catholic

==== Titular diocese ====
- Michel-Gaspard Coppenrath (16 Feb 1968 – 5 Mar 1973)
- Mogale Paul Nkhumishe (5 Nov 1981 – 9 Jan 1984)
- Aldo Maria Lazzarín Stella (15 May 1989 – 16 Oct 2010)
- Peter Comensoli (20 Apr 2011 – 20 Nov 2014)
- Denis Jachiet (25 June 2016 – 14 November 2021)
