= Synod of Arles =

Arles (ancient Arelate) in the south of Roman Gaul (modern France) hosted several councils or synods referred to as Concilium Arelatense in the history of the early Christian church.

== Council of Arles in 314 ==
The first council of Arles took place a year after the Edict of Milan, in which Christianity became a legal religion. The council was opened by presiding bishop Marinus of Arles on 1 August 314 while bishop Chrestus of Syracusae had the imperial authority to organise the agenda. The council is notable also for the presence of three British bishops – Eborius, Restitutus and Adelfius – documenting the presence of Christianity in Roman Britain. This council was the first called by Constantine and is the forerunner of the First Council of Nicaea. Augustine of Hippo called it an ecumenical council. It had the following outcomes:

- Excommunication of "those who lay down their weapons in peacetime". The relevant canon has variously been interpreted as excommunicating peacetime conscientious objectors, supporting conscientious objectors, supporting Roman citizenship and excommunicating gladiators.
- Easter should be held on the same day throughout the world, rather than being set by each local church.
- Donatism was condemned as a heresy and Donatus Magnus was excommunicated. This had begun as an appeal by the Donatists to Constantine the Great against the decision of a synod in Rome in 313 at the Lateran under Pope Miltiades. The appeal had turned out unfavorably to the Donatists who afterwards became enemies of the Roman authorities.
- Canon against the non-residence of clergy.
- Canon against participation in races and gladiatorial fights (to be punished by excommunication).
- Canon against the rebaptism of heretics.
- Clergymen who could be proven to have delivered sacred books in persecution (the traditores) should be deposed, but their official acts were to be held valid.
- Ordination required the assistance of at least three bishops.
- Excommunication of all actors (theatrici) and charioteers.
- Canons on other matters of discipline.

== Council of Arles in 353 ==
The council of 353 was called in support of Arianism. It was attended, among others, by two papal legates, Bishop Vincentius of Capua and Bishop Marcellus of Campania. The legates were tempted into rejecting communion with Athanasius, while the synod refused to condemn Arius, despite an agreement to do so entered into before the synod began, an act which filled Pope Liberius with grief. Their consent was ultimately forced out of them by the Emperor Constantius, an Arian himself.

== Council of Arles in 435 ==
A council was held on New Year's Day of 435, to settle the differences that had arisen between the Abbot of Lérins and the Bishop of Fréjus.

== Councils of Arles in 443 and 452 ==
In the synod of 443 (452), attended also by bishops of neighbouring provinces, fifty-six canons were formulated, mostly repetitions of earlier disciplinary decrees. Neophytes were excluded from major orders; married men aspiring to the priesthood were required to promise a life of continency, and it was forbidden to consecrate a bishop without the assistance of three other bishops and the consent of the Metropolitan.

== Council of 451 ==
A council of 451 held after the close of the Council of Chalcedon in that year, sent its adhesion to the "Epistola dogmatica" of Pope Leo I, written by Flavian of Constantinople (see Eutyches)

== Council of 463 ==
Apropos of the conflict between the archiepiscopal See of Vienne and Arles a council was held in the latter city in 463, which called forth a famous letter from St. Leo I. Bishop Leontius of Arles presided; twenty bishops attended.

== Council of c. 475 ==
Another council was called "about the year 475". It was attended by thirty bishops; the pre-destinationist teachings of the priest Lucidus were condemned at this council. The bishops also insisted that Lucidus condemn his own opinions, and Lucidus complied, writing a letter retracting his "errors".

== Council of Arles in 506 ==
The council of 506 exemplified the close connection between the church and the Merovingian dynasty.

== Council of Arles in 524 ==
A regional council was held in 524, with 14 bishops and 4 presbyters present. This council was held under the presidency of St. Caesarius of Arles; its canons deal chiefly with the conferring of orders. A number of Caesarius of Arles' works have been published in Sources Chrétiennes.

== Councils of Arles in 554 and 682 ==
Little is known of the councils of 554 and 682.

== Council of Arles in 648/60 ==
The council in 648/660 was possibly a provincial council, at which Theudorius of Arles was to be judged.

== Council of 813 ==
An important council was held in 813, at the instigation of Charlemagne, for the correction of abuses and the reestablishment of ecclesiastical discipline. Its decrees insist on a sufficient ecclesiastical education of bishops and priests, on the duty of both to preach frequently to the people and to instruct them in the Catholic Faith, on the obligation of parents to instruct their children, etc.

== Council of 1034 ==
In 1034 a council was held at Arles for the re-establishment of peace, the restoration of Christian Faith, the awakening in the popular heart of a sense of divine goodness and of salutary fear by the consideration of past evils.

== Council of Arles in 1234/1236 ==
The 1234 Council opposed the Albigensian heresy. In 1236 a further council was held under the presidency of Jean Baussan, Archbishop of Arles, which issued twenty-four canons, mostly against the prevalent Albigensian heresy, and for the observance of the decrees of the Lateran Council of 1215 and that of Toulouse in 1229. Close inspection of their dioceses is urged on the bishops, as a remedy against the spread of heresy; testaments are declared invalid unless made in the presence of the parish priest. This measure, met with in other councils, was meant to prevent testamentary dispositions in favour of known heretics.

== Council of 1251 (Avignon) ==
In 1251, Jean, Archbishop of Arles, held a council near Avignon (Concilium Insculanum), among whose thirteen canons is one providing that the sponsor at baptism is bound to give only the white robe in which the infant is baptized.

== Councils of 1260, 1263, and 1275 ==
In 1260 a council held by Florentin, Archbishop of Arles, decreed that confirmation must be received for fasting, and that on Sundays and feast days the religious should not open their churches to the faithful, nor preach at the hour of the parish Mass. People were not to marry without the permission of the clergy. The laity should be instructed by their parish priests. The religious should also frequent the parochial service, for the sake of good example. This council also condemned the doctrines spread abroad under the name of Joachim of Fiore, a 12th-century monk and mystic.

Joachim of Fiore was further condemned at a Council held in 1263.

In 1275, twenty-two earlier observances were promulgated anew at a Council of Arles.

== See also ==
- Archdiocese of Arles (suppressed in 1822)
- Early Christianity § Southern Gaul
