= Donatism =

Christian sect

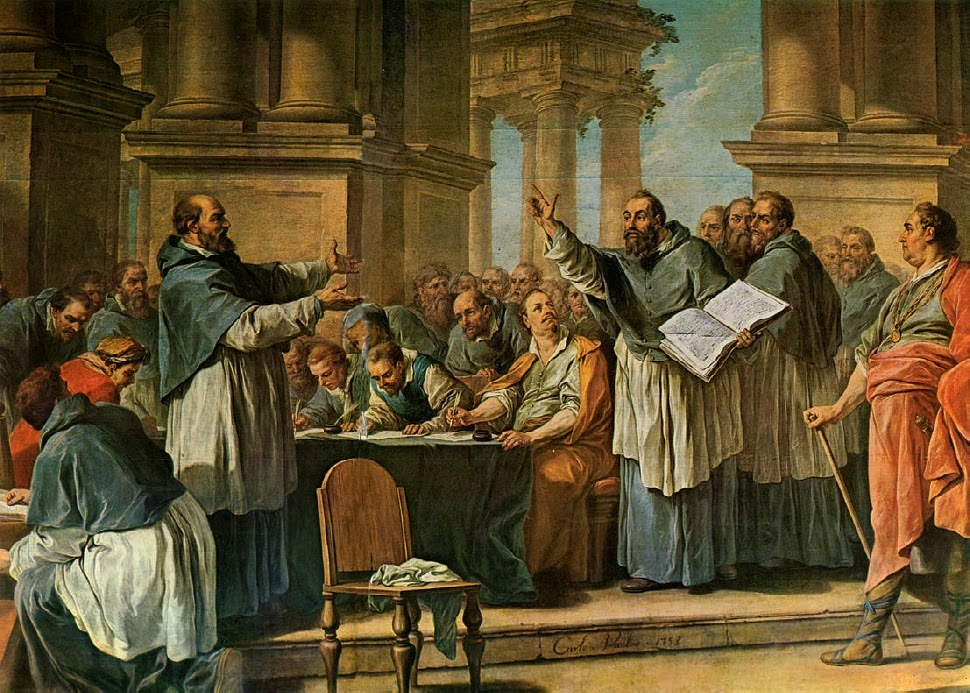
Charles-André van Loo's 18th-century Augustine arguing with Donatists

Donatism was a schism from the Catholic Church in the Archdiocese of Carthage from the fourth to the sixth centuries. Donatists argued that Christian clergy must be faultless for their ministry to be effective and their prayers and sacraments to be valid. Donatism had its roots in the long-established Christian community of the Roman province Africa Proconsularis (present-day Tunisia, the northeast of Algeria, and the western coast of Libya) and Mauretania Tingitana (corresponding roughly with the northern part of present-day Morocco), in the persecutions of Christians under Diocletian. Named after the Berber Christian bishop Donatus Magnus, Donatism flourished during the fourth and fifth centuries. Donatism mainly spread among the indigenous Berber population, and Donatists were able to blend Christianity with many of the Berber local customs.

== Origin and controversy ==
The Roman governor of Africa, often lenient to the large Christian minority under his rule throughout the Diocletianic Persecutions, was satisfied when Christians handed over their scriptures as a token repudiation of faith. When the persecution ended, Christians who did so were called traditores—"those who handed (the holy things) over"—by their critics (who were mainly from the poorer classes).

Like third-century Novatianism, the Donatists were rigorists; the church must be a church of "saints" (not "sinners"), and sacraments administered by traditores were considered invalid. In 311 Caecilian (a new bishop of Carthage) was consecrated by Felix of Aptungi, an alleged traditor. His opponents consecrated Majorinus, a short-lived rival who was succeeded by Donatus.

Two years later, a commission appointed by Pope Miltiades condemned the Donatists. They persisted, seeing themselves as the true church with valid sacraments. Because of their association with the violent Circumcellions, the Donatists were repressed by Roman authorities. Although they had local support, their opponents were supported by Rome and by the rest of the orthodox catholic Church. The Donatists were still a force during the lifetime of Augustine of Hippo, and disappeared only after the seventh- and eighth-century Muslim conquest. The Donatists refused to accept the sacraments and spiritual authority of priests and bishops who were traditores during the persecution, many of whom had returned to positions of spiritual authority under Constantine I.

Whether the sacrament of Penance could reconcile a traditor to full communion was questioned, and the church's position was that the sacrament could. The church still imposed years- (sometimes decades-) long public penance for serious sins. A penitent would first beg for the prayers of those entering a church from outside its doors. They would next be permitted to kneel inside the church during the Liturgy. After being allowed to stand with the congregation, the penitent would finally be allowed to receive the Eucharist again. According to Donatists, apostasy would permanently disqualify a man from church leadership.

The validity of sacraments administered by priests and bishops who had been traditores was denied by the Donatists. According to Augustine, a sacrament was from God and ex opere operato (Latin for "from the work carried out"). A priest or bishop in a state of mortal sin could continue to administer valid sacraments. The Donatists believed that a repentant apostate priest could no longer consecrate the Eucharist. Some towns had both Donatist and orthodox congregations.

== Impact ==
The sect developed and grew in North Africa, with unrest and threatened riots in Carthage connected to the bishop controversy. (Note: The remainder of this paragraph comes from Frend 1952, who derived his chronology primarily from Optatus' Against the Donatists (one of the only surviving primary sources).) Constantine, hoping to defuse the unrest, gave money to the non-Donatist bishop Caecilian as payment for churches damaged or confiscated during the persecution. Nothing was given to the Donatists; Constantine was apparently not fully aware of the seriousness of the dispute, which his gift exacerbated. The Donatists appealed to Rome for equal treatment; Constantine tasked Miltiades with resolving the issue, which led to the 313 commission. The Donatists refused to abide by the decision of the Roman council, demanding that a local council adjudicate the dispute and appealing directly to Constantine. In a surviving letter, a frustrated Constantine called for what became the first Council of Arles in 314. The council ruled against the Donatists, who again appealed to Constantine. The emperor ordered all parties to Rome for a hearing, ruled in favour of Caecilian and warned against unrest. A delegation from Rome travelled to Carthage in a vain attempt to seek compromise. The Donatists fomented protests and street violence, refusing to compromise in favor of the orthodox bishop.

When other Christians accepted the emperor's decision, the Donatists continued to resist and demonize him. After several attempts at reconciliation, in 317 Constantine issued an edict threatening death to anyone who disturbed the imperial peace; another edict followed, calling for the confiscation of all Donatist church property. Donatus refused to surrender his buildings in Carthage, and the local Roman governor sent troops to deal with him and his followers. The historical records for what ensued are unclear, with possibly their clergy being exiled.

Outside Carthage, Donatist churches and clergy were undisturbed. Constantine's efforts to unite the church and the Donatists failed, and by 321 he asked the bishops to show moderation and patience to the sect in an open letter. During the brief reign of Julian, the Donatists were revitalized and, due to imperial protection, occupied churches and carried out atrocities. Laws against the Donatists were decreed by Valentinian I after the defeat of the Donatist usurper Firmus in North Africa.

== Opposition ==
Augustine of Hippo campaigned against Donatism as bishop; through his efforts, orthodoxy gained the upper hand. According to Augustine and the church, the validity of sacraments was a property of the priesthood independent of individual character. Influenced by the Old Testament, he believed in discipline as a means of education.

In his letter to Vincentius, Augustine used the New Testament Parable of the Great Banquet to justify using force against the Donatists: "You are of opinion that no one should be compelled to follow righteousness; and yet you read that the householder said to his servants, 'Whomsoever ye shall find, compel them to come in.'" However, even though Augustine favoured the use of force, he rejected applying the death penalty to the Donatists.'"

In 409, Emperor Honorius's secretary of state, Marcellinus of Carthage, issued a decree which condemned the Donatists as heretical and demanded that they surrender their churches. This was made possible by a collatio in which St. Augustine legally proved that Constantine had chosen the Nicene church over the Donatists as the imperial church. The Donatists were persecuted by the Roman authorities to such a degree that Augustine protested their treatment.

The Council of Trent (1545–1563) taught that in the divine sacrifice of the Holy Mass "is contained and immolated, in an unbloody manner, the same Christ that offered Himself in a bloody manner upon the altar of the Cross. Hence, it is the same victim, the same sacrificing-priest who offers Himself now through the ministry of priests and who once offers Himself upon the Cross." The worth of the sacrifice does not depend on the celebrating priest (or bishop), but on the "worth of the victim and on the dignity of the chief priest- none other than Jesus Christ Himself". More specifically, the Decree on the Sacraments in General, approved on March 3, 1547, during the Seventh Session, at Canon 12 (DH 1612) states:

CANON XII.-If any one saith, that a minister, being in mortal sin,-if so be that he observe all the essentials which belong to the effecting, or conferring of, the sacrament,-neither effects, nor confers the sacrament; let him be anathema.

Similarly, Thomas Aquinas taught the doctrine of ex opere operato (Summa Theologiae III, q. 64, a. 5):

The ministers of the Church do not by their own power cleanse from sin those who approach the sacraments, nor do they confer grace upon them: it is Christ who does this by His own power while He employs them as instruments.- Therefore the ministers of the Church can confer the sacraments though they be wicked.

Aquinas affirmed the efficacy of the sacraments even when the ministers are unworthy and even if they lack faith (S. Th. Iii, q. 64, a. 5 and a. 9), provided that they have the intention of doing what the Church does (a. 7).

== Decline ==
The effects of Augustine's theological success and the emperor's legal action were somewhat reversed when the Vandals conquered North Africa. Donatism may have also gradually declined because Donatists and orthodox Christians were equally marginalised by the Arian Vandals, but it survived the Vandal occupation and Justinian I's Byzantine reconquest. Although it is unknown how long Donatism persisted, some Christian historians believe that the schism and its ensuing unrest in the Christian community facilitated the seventh-century Muslim conquest of the region.

== Related groups and individuals ==
Donatism is associated with a number of other groups, including:

- The Rogatists were a pacifist breakaway faction who rejected the excesses of the Circumcellions and Donatists.
- The Claudianists, who (with the Urbanists) were reconciled to the Donatists by Donatist Bishop Primian of Carthage.
- Ticonius was an influential thinker who was expelled by the Donatists for his rejection of rebaptism.
- Followers of Maximian, who broke away from the mainline Donatist group because of perceived impurities within mainline Donatism.
- The Circumcellions, a name given by opponents based on circum cellas euntes ("making a circuit around martyr shrines," but some older histories thought it meant "making circuits around barns") because of their practice of living as homeless roamers. Among Donatists they were known as agonistici, which means "soldiers of Christ". They regarded martyrdom as the supreme Christian virtue (disagreeing with the Episcopal see of Carthage on the primacy of chastity, sobriety, humility, and charity). Some mainline Donatists found them useful allies, but others were disgusted by their use of violence and sought to curb their influence by church councils.
- Apostolic churches, a sect emulating the Apostles about which little is known. But it is very plausible that they were influenced by precedent gnostic Apotactics.

In Mauretania and Numidia, the Catholic Encyclopedia claims that the splinter groups were so numerous that the Donatists could not name them all.

== Bishops ==
The Donatists followed a succession of bishops:

- Majorinus (311–313)
- Donatus Magnus (313–355; exiled 347)
- Parmenian (355–391)
- Primian (391–393)
- Maximianus (393–394)
- Primian (394–c. 400)

== Later influence ==
- Early Kharijites, a strict sect of Islam in the same Berber region.

== Epithet ==
For several centuries during the High Middle Ages and the Reformation, accusations of Donatism were levelled against church-reform movements which criticized clerical immorality on theological grounds. The early reformers John Wycliffe and Jan Hus were accused of Donatism by their theological opponents. Wycliffe taught that the moral corruption of priests invalidated their offices and sacraments, a belief characterizing Donatism. Hus similarly argued that a prelate's moral character determined his ecclesiastical authority, a position his contemporaries compared to Donatism and condemned as heresy at the Council of Constance.

During the Reformation, Roman Catholic Counter-Reformers such as Johann Eck accused the magisterial Reformers of Donatism (although the latter had partially distanced themselves from Wycliffe's theology to avoid such a charge). Magisterial Reformers like Ulrich Zwingli labeled radical Reformers, such as the Anabaptists, as Donatists; Roman Catholics were portrayed in Reformation rhetoric as Pelagian, another early Christian heresy. In Eastern Orthodoxy, the Bezpopovtsy (priestless) strain of Old Believers believed that because the Russian bishops acquiesced to Patriarch Nikon's reforms they (and the other patriarchs) forfeited any claim to apostolic succession.

Accusations of Donatism remain common in contemporary intra-Christian polemics. Conservative Lutherans are sometimes called Donatists by their liberal brethren, referring to their doctrine of church fellowship and their position that churches which deny that Jesus' body and blood are eaten during the Eucharist do not celebrate a valid Lord's Supper.

== See also ==
- State church of the Roman Empire
- Meletius of Lycopolis
- Great Apostasy
- Kharjites
- Novatianism
- Maximian of Bagai

== Sources ==
- Cantor, Norman F (1995), The Civilization of the Middle Ages
- Chisholm, Hugh, ed. (1911). "Donatists" . Encyclopædia Britannica. Vol. 08 (11th ed.). Cambridge University Press. p. 410, 411.
- Daniel, Robin (2010), This Holy Seed: Faith, Hope and Love in the Early Churches of North Africa, Chester: Tamarisk Publications, ISBN 978-0-9538565-3-4.
- Frend, WHC (1952), The Donatist Church: A Movement of Protest in Roman North Africa, Oxford University Press, ISBN 0-19-826408-9.
- Lohr, Winrich (2007), "Western Christianities", in Casidy, Augustine; Norris, Frederick W. (eds.), Cambridge History of Christianity, vol. 2:Constantine to 600c., Cambridge University Press
- Tilley, Maureen A, ed. (1996), Donatist martyr stories: the Church in conflict in Roman North Africa, Liverpool University Press, ISBN 0-85323-931-2.
- ——— (1997), The Bible in Christian North Africa: The Donatist World, Fortress Press, ISBN 0-8006-2880-2.
