= Archdiocese of Carthage =

Former Latin Catholic diocese established in Roman Carthage, now a titular see

Archdiocese of Carthage Archidioecesis Carthaginensis
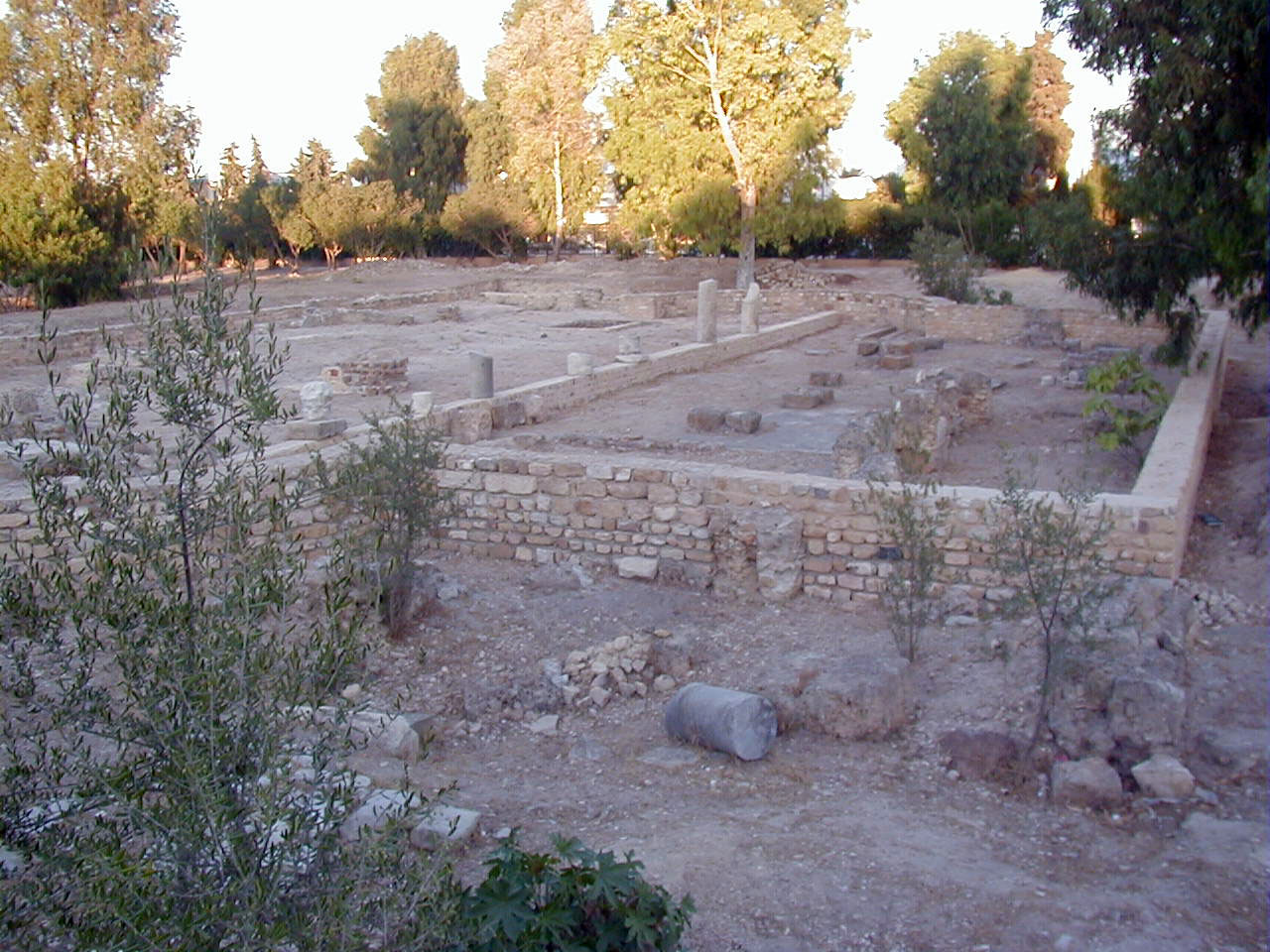
- Early Christian quarter in ancient Carthage
- Incumbent; Cyriacus of Carthage (last residing ca. 1070); Agostino Casaroli (last titular archbishop 1979)

Location
- Country: Roman Empire; Vandal Kingdom; Byzantine Empire; Umayyad Caliphate; Abbasid Caliphate; Fatimid Caliphate; French protectorate of Tunisia; Tunisia
- Ecclesiastical province: Early African church
- Metropolitan: Carthage
- Headquarters: Carthage
- Coordinates: 36.8528°N 10.3233°E)

Information
- Denomination: Catholic Church
- Sui iuris church: Latin Church
- Rite: African Rite
- Established: 2nd century
- Dissolved: In partibus infidelium in 1519

Leadership
- Pope: Leo XIV
- Titular archbishop: Vacant since 1979

The Archdiocese of Carthage is a Latin Catholic titular see originally established as a diocese in Carthage, Roman Empire, in the 2nd century. Agrippinus was the first named bishop, appointed around 230 AD.

The diocese, in its earlier form, was to the Early African church what the Diocese of Rome was to the Catholic Church in Italy. The archdiocese used the African Rite, a variant of the Western liturgical rites in Latin language, possibly a local use of the primitive Roman Rite. Famous figures include Saint Perpetua, Saint Felicitas, and their Companions (died c. 203), Tertullian (c. 155–240), Cyprian (c. 200–258), Caecilianus (floruit 311), Saint Aurelius (died 429), and Eugenius of Carthage (died 505). Tertullian and Cyprian are both considered Latin Church Fathers of the Latin Church.

Tertullian, a theologian of part Berber descent, was instrumental in the development of trinitarian theology, and was the first to apply Latin language extensively in his theological writings. As such, Tertullian has been called "the father of Latin Christianity" and "the founder of Western theology." Carthage remained an important center of Christianity, hosting several councils of Carthage.

Carthage exercised informal primacy as an archdiocese, being the most important center of Christianity in the whole of Roman Africa, corresponding to most of today's Mediterranean coast and inland of Northern Africa. As such, it enjoyed the title of primate of Africa.

In the 6th century, turbulent controversies in teachings affected the diocese: Donatism, Arianism, Manichaeism, and Pelagianism. Some proponents established their own parallel hierarchies.

The city of Carthage fell to the Muslim conquest of the Maghreb with the Battle of Carthage (698). The episcopal see remained but Christianity declined under persecution. The last resident bishop, Cyriacus of Carthage, was documented in 1076. It became a titular see with bishops appointed beginning in the 16th century, was briefly restored as a residential see in the 19th century, and was again made titular in 1964, being supplanted by the Archdiocese of Tunis. The titular see of Carthage has been vacant since 1979.

== History ==
=== Background ===
The temporal importance of the city of Carthage in the Roman Empire had previously been restored by Julius Caesar and Augustus. When Christianity became firmly established around the Roman province of Africa Proconsulare, Carthage became its natural ecclesiastical seat. The Diocese of Carthage was to the Early African church what the Diocese of Rome was to the Catholic Church in Italy. The archdiocese used the African Rite, a variant of the Western liturgical rites in Latin language, possibly a local use of the primitive Roman Rite.

=== Antiquity ===
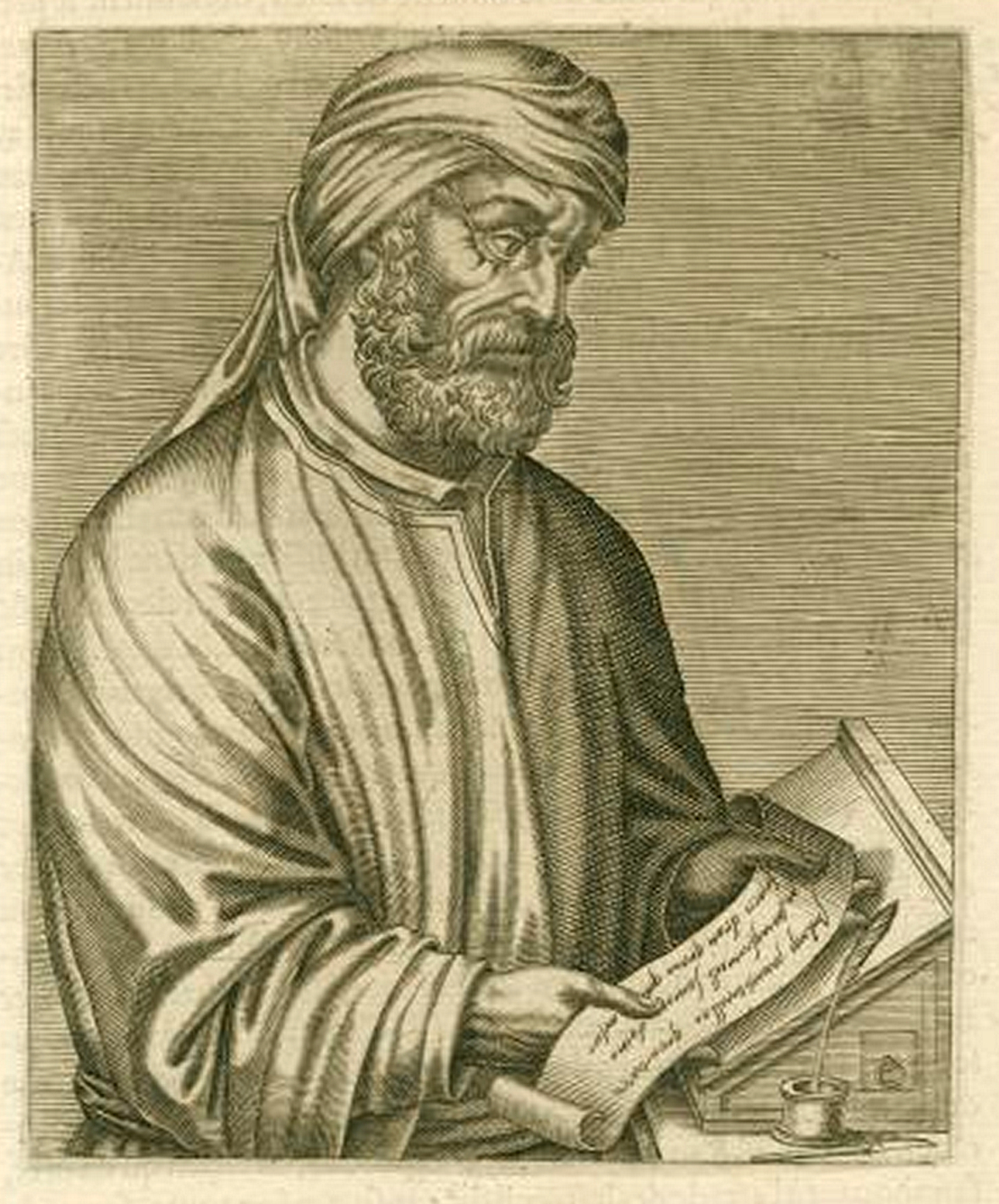
Tertullian (c. 155–240), a theologian of part Berber descent, was instrumental in the development of trinitarian theology, and was the first to apply Latin language extensively in his theological writings. As such, Tertullian has been called "the father of Latin Christianity" and "the founder of Western theology."

==== Earliest bishops ====
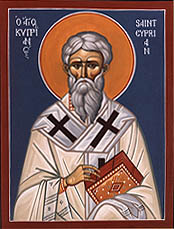
Cyprian of Carthage, Thascius Caecilius Cyprianus, bishop of Carthage, Church Father, died in martyrdom in 258.

In Christian traditions, some accounts give as the first bishop of Carthage Crescens, ordained by Saint Peter, or Speratus, one of the Scillitan Martyrs. Epenetus of Carthage is found in Pseudo-Dorotheus and Pseudo-Hippolytus lists of seventy disciples. The account of the martyrdom of Saint Perpetua and her companions in 203 mentions an Optatus who is generally taken to have been bishop of Carthage, but who may instead have been bishop of Thuburbo Minus. The first certain historically documented bishop of Carthage is Agrippinus around the 230s. Also historically certain is Donatus, the immediate predecessor of Cyprian (249–258).

==== Primacy ====
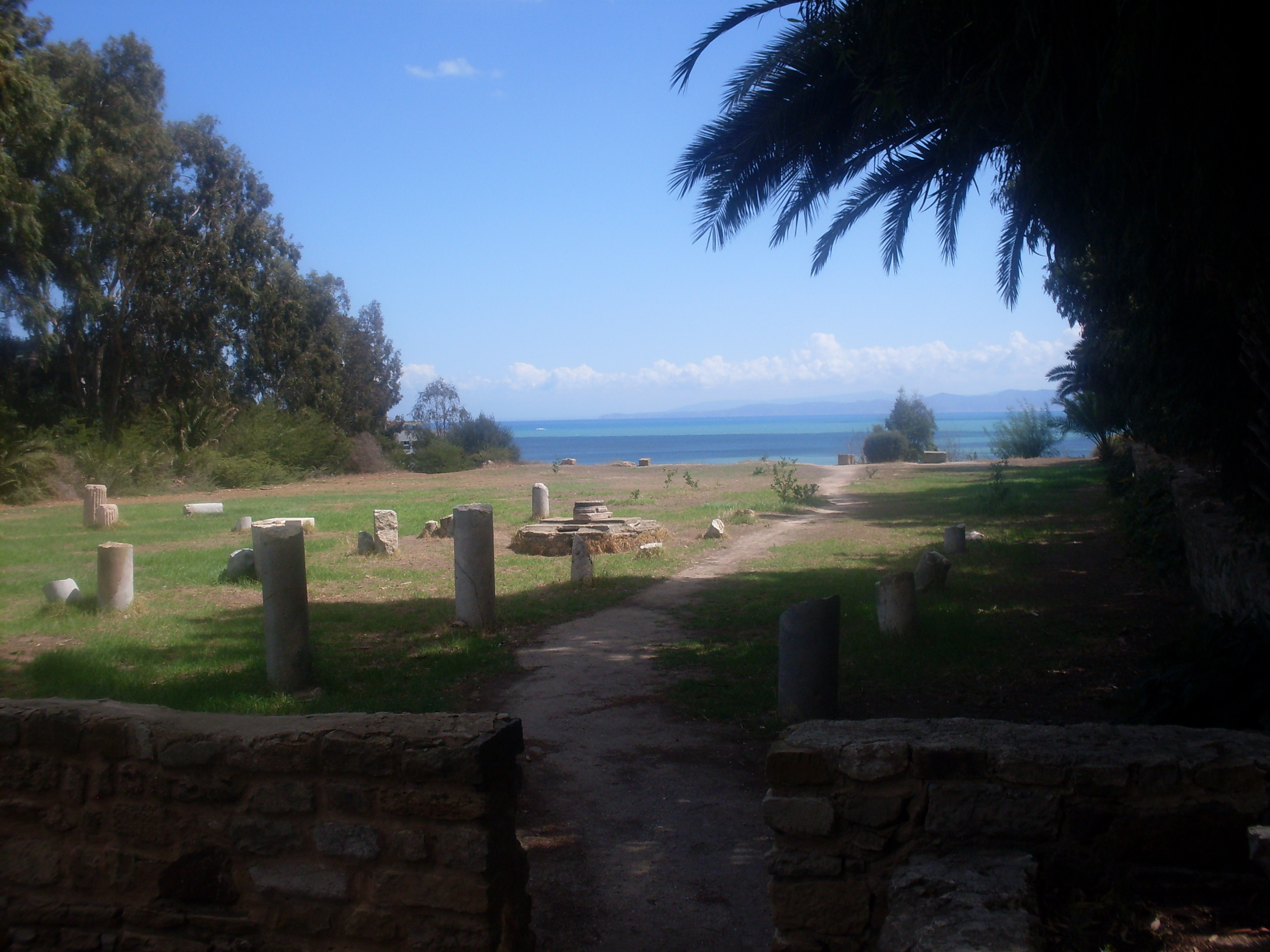
Ruins of the Basilica called of Saint Cyprian, discovered in 1915.

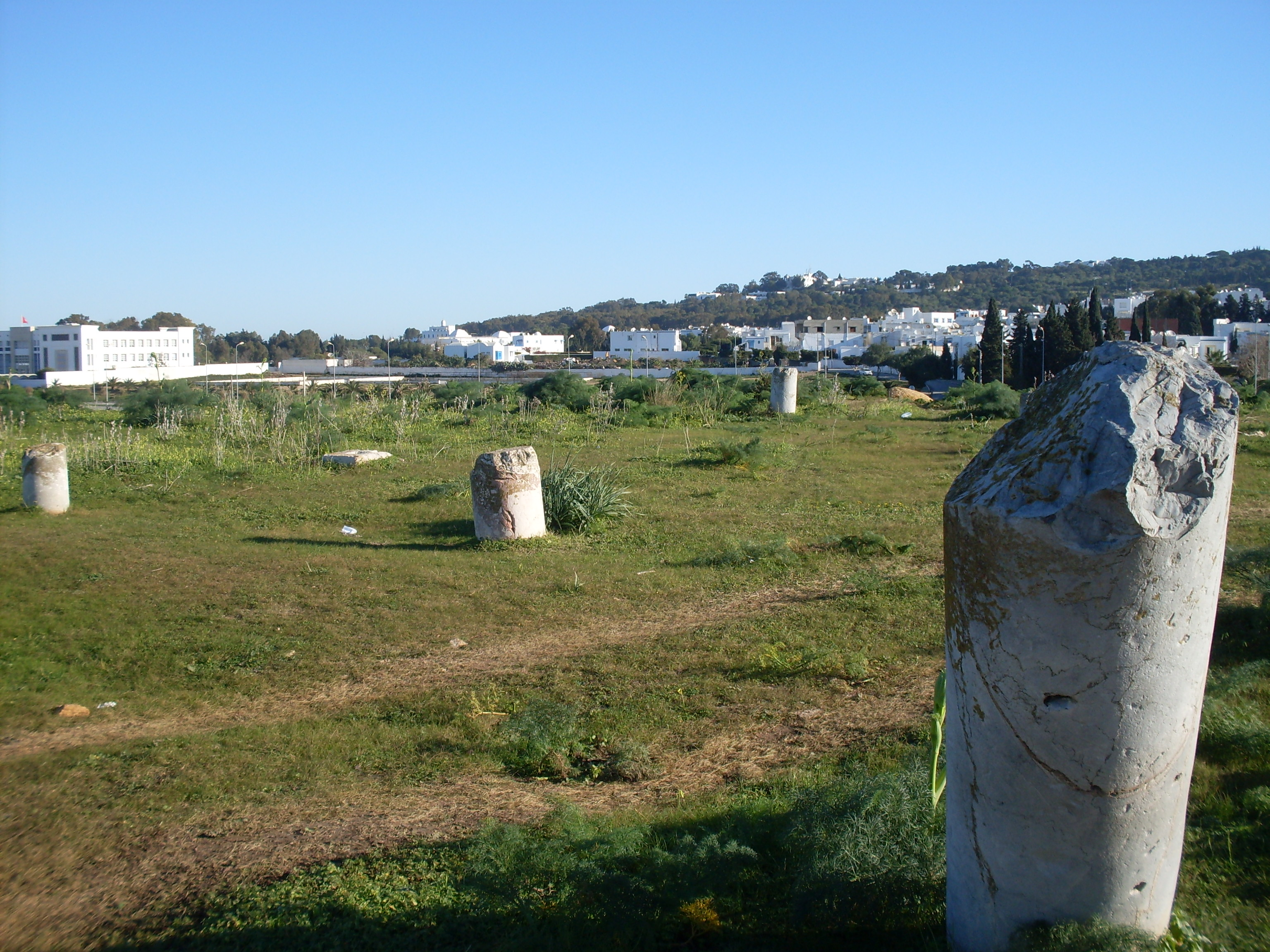
Ruins of the Basilica Majorum (also called of Meildfa) in Carthage, where inscription has been found dedicated to Saint Perpetua and Saint Felicitas.

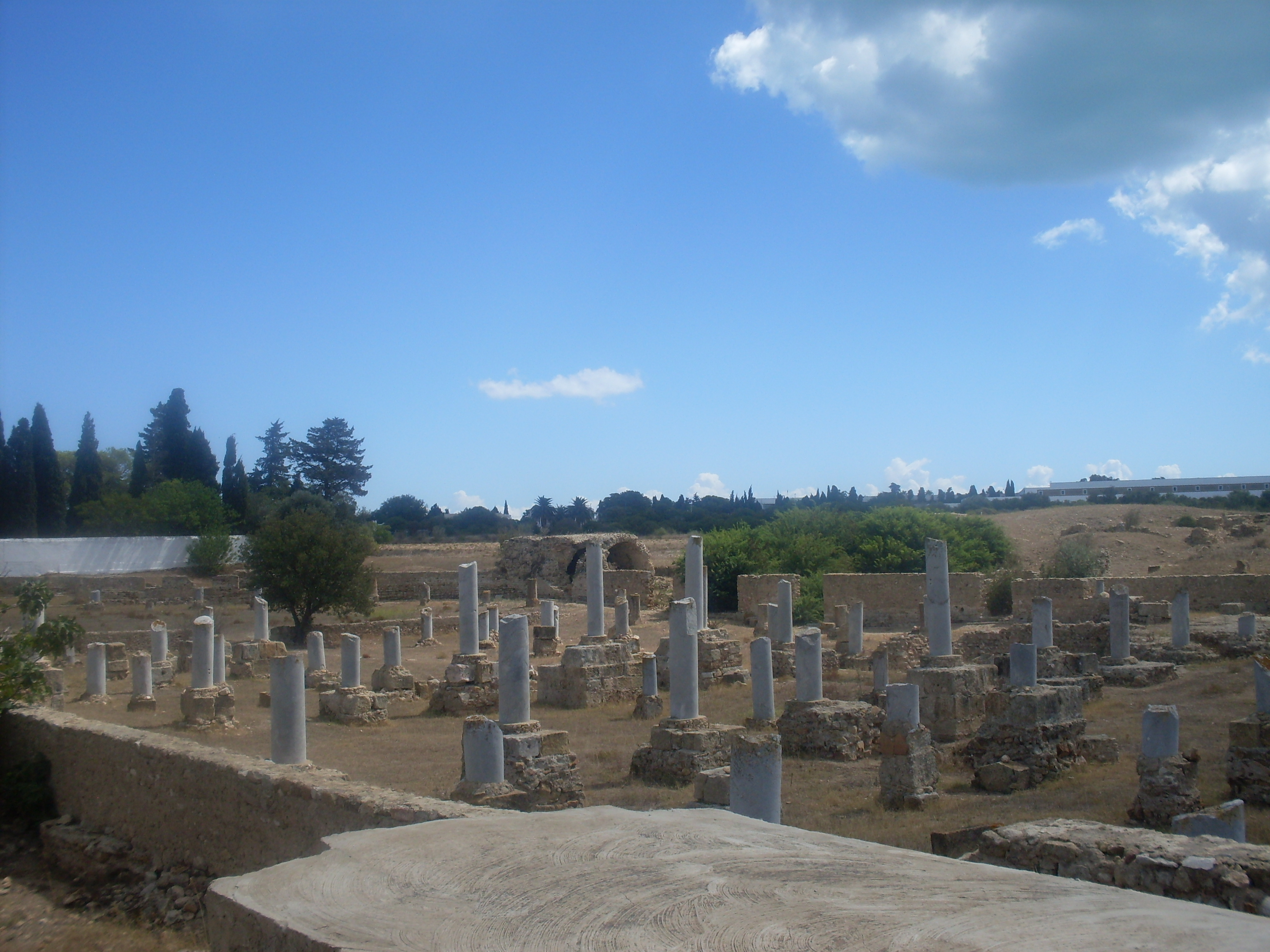
Ruins of the Basilica of Damous El Karita, the largest church building in Carthage, ornamented with more than 100 columns.

In the 3rd century, at the time of Cyprian, the bishops of Carthage exercised a real though not formalized primacy in the Early African Church. not only in the Roman province of Proconsular Africa in the broadest sense (even when it was divided into three provinces through the establishment of Byzacena and Tripolitania), but also, in some supra-metropolitan form, over the Church in Numidia and Mauretania. The provincial primacy was associated with the senior bishop in the province rather than with a particular see and was of little importance in comparison to the authority of the bishop of Carthage, who could be appealed to directly by the clergy of any province.

Carthage exercised informal primacy as an archdiocese, being the most important center of Christianity in the whole of Roman Africa, corresponding to most of today's Mediterranean coast and inland of Northern Africa. As such, it enjoyed the title of primate of Africa.

==== Division ====
Cyprian faced opposition within his own diocese over the question of the proper treatment of the lapsi who had fallen away from the Christian faith under persecution.

More than eighty bishops, some from distant frontier regions of Numidia, attended the Council of Carthage (256).

A division in the church that came to be known as the Donatist controversy began in 313 among Christians in North Africa. The Donatists stressed the holiness of the church and refused to accept the authority to administer the sacraments of those who had surrendered the scriptures when they were forbidden under the Emperor Diocletian. The Donatists also opposed the involvement of Emperor Constantine in church affairs in contrast to the majority of Christians who welcomed official imperial recognition.

The occasionally violent controversy has been characterized as a struggle between opponents and supporters of the Roman system. The most articulate North African critic of the Donatist position, which came to be called a heresy, was Augustine, bishop of Hippo Regius. Augustine maintained that the unworthiness of a minister did not affect the validity of the sacraments because their true minister was Christ. In his sermons and books Augustine, who is considered a leading exponent of Christian dogma, evolved a theory of the right of orthodox Christian rulers to use force against schismatics and heretics. Although the dispute was resolved by a decision of an imperial commission in the Council of Carthage (411), Donatist communities continued to exist as late as the 6th century.

==== Successors of Cyprian until before the Vandal invasion ====
The immediate successors of Cyprian were Lucianus and Carpophorus, but there is disagreement about which of the two was earlier. A bishop Cyrus, mentioned in a lost work by Augustine, is placed by some before, by others after, the time of Cyprian. There is greater certainty about the 4th-century bishops: Mensurius, bishop by 303, succeeded in 311 by Caecilianus, who was at the First Council of Nicaea and who was opposed by the Donatist bishop Majorinus (311–315). Rufus participated in an anti-Arian council held in Rome in 337 or 340 under Pope Julius I. He was opposed by Donatus Magnus, the true founder of Donatism. Gratus (344– ) was at the Council of Sardica and presided over the Council of Carthage (349). He was opposed by Donatus Magnus and, after his exile and death, by Parmenianus, whom the Donatists chose as his successor. Restitutus accepted the Arian formula at the Council of Rimini in 359 but later repented. Genethlius presided over two councils at Carthage, the second of which was held in 390.

By the end of the 4th century, the settled areas had become Christianized, and some Berber tribes had converted en masse.

The next bishop was Saint Aurelius, who in 421 presided over another council at Carthage and was still alive in 426. His Donatist opponent was Primianus, who had succeeded Parmenianus in about 391. A dispute between Primian and Maximian, a relative of Donatus, resulted in the largest Maximian schism within the Donatist movement.

==== Bishops under the Vandals ====
Capreolus was bishop of Carthage when the Vandals conquered the province. Unable for that reason to attend the Council of Ephesus in 431 as chief bishop of Africa, he sent his deacon Basula or Bessula to represent him. In about 437, he was succeeded by Quodvultdeus, whom Gaiseric exiled and who died in Naples. A 15-year vacancy followed. Pope Leo I confirmed the primacy of the bishop of Carthage in 446: "Indeed, after the Roman Bishop, the leading Bishop and metropolitan for all Africa is the Bishop of Carthage."

In 454, Deogratias was ordained bishop of Carthage. He died at the end of 457 or the beginning of 458, and Carthage remained without a bishop for another 24 years. Saint Eugenius was consecrated in around 481, exiled, along with other Catholic bishops, by Huneric in 484, recalled in 487, but in 491 forced to flee to Albi in Gaul, where he died. When the Vandal persecution ended in 523, Bonifacius became bishop of Carthage and held a Council in 525.

=== Middle Ages ===
==== Praetorian prefecture of Africa ====
The Eastern Roman Empire established its praetorian prefecture of Africa after the reconquest of northwestern Africa during the Vandalic War 533–534. Bonifacius was succeeded by Reparatus, who held firm in the Three Chapters Controversy and in 551 was exiled to Pontus, where he died. He was replaced by Primosus, who accepted the emperor's wishes on the controversy. He was represented at the Second Council of Constantinople in 553 by the bishop of Tunis. Publianus was bishop of Carthage from before 566 to after 581. Dominicus is mentioned in letters of Pope Gregory the Great between 592 and 601. Fortunius lived at the time of Pope Theodore I (c. 640) and went to Constantinople in the time of Patriarch Paul II of Constantinople (641 to 653). Victor became bishop of Carthage in 646.

==== Last resident bishops ====
At the beginning of the 8th century and at the end of the 9th, Carthage still appears in lists of dioceses over which the Patriarch of Alexandria claimed jurisdiction.

Two letters of Pope Leo IX on 27 December 1053 show that the diocese of Carthage was still a residential see. The texts are given in the Patrologia Latina of Migne. They were written in reply to consultations regarding a conflict between the bishops of Carthage and Gummi about who was to be considered the metropolitan, with the right to convoke a synod. In each of the two letters, the pope laments that, while in the past Carthage had had a church council of 205 bishops, the number of bishops in the whole territory of Africa was now reduced to five, and that, even among those five, there was jealousy and contention. However, he congratulated the bishops to whom he wrote for submitting the question to the Bishop of Rome, whose consent was required for a definitive decision. The first of the two letters (Letter 83 of the collection) is addressed to Thomas, Bishop of Africa, whom Mesnages deduces to have been the bishop of Carthage. The other letter (Letter 84 of the collection) is addressed to Bishops Petrus and Ioannes, whose sees are not mentioned, and whom the pope congratulates for having supported the rights of the see of Carthage.

In each of the two letters, Pope Leo declares that, after the Bishop of Rome, the first archbishop and chief metropolitan of the whole of Africa is the bishop of Carthage, while the bishop of Gummi, whatever his dignity or power, will act, except for what concerns his own diocese, like the other African bishops, by consultation with the archbishop of Carthage. In the letter addressed to Petrus and Ioannes, Pope Leo adds to his declaration of the position of the bishop of Carthage the eloquent declaration: "... nor can he, for the benefit of any bishop in the whole of Africa lose the privilege received once for all from the holy Roman and apostolic see, but he will hold it until the end of the world as long as the name of our Lord Jesus Christ is invoked there, whether Carthage lie desolate or whether it some day rise glorious again". When in the 19th century the residential see of Carthage was for a while restored, Cardinal Charles-Martial-Allemand Lavigerie had these words inscribed in letters of gold beneath the dome of his great cathedral. The building now belongs the Tunisian state and is used for concerts.

Later, an archbishop of Carthage named Cyriacus was imprisoned by the Arab rulers because of an accusation by some Christians. Pope Gregory VII wrote him a letter of consolation, repeating the hopeful assurances of the primacy of the Church of Carthage, "whether the Church of Carthage should still lie desolate or rise again in glory". By 1076, Cyriacus was set free, but there was only one other bishop in the province. These are the last of whom there is mention in that period of the history of the see.

==== Decline ====
After the Muslim conquest of the Maghreb, the church gradually died out along with the local Latin dialect. The Islamization of Christian appears to have been quick and the Arab authors paid scant attention to them. Christian graves inscribed with Latin and dated to 10th–11th centuries are known. By the end of 10th century, the number of bishoprics in the Maghreb region was 47 including 10 in southern Tunisia. In 1053, Pope Leo IX commented that only five bishoprics were left in Africa.

Some primary accounts including Arabic ones in 10th century mention persecutions of the Church and measures undertaken by Muslim rulers to suppress it. A schism among the African churches developed by the time of Pope Formosus. In 980, Christians of Carthage contacted Pope Benedict VII, asking to declare Jacob as an archbishop. Leo IX declared the bishop of Carthage as the "first archbishop and metropolitan of all Africa" when a bishop of Gummi in Byzacena declared the region a metropolis. By the time of Gregory VII, the Church was unable to appoint a bishop which traditionally would have only required presence of three other bishops. This was likely due to persecutions and possibly other churches breaking off their communion with Carthage. In 1152, the Muslim rulers ordered the Christians of Tunisia to convert or face death. The only African bishopric mentioned in a list in 1192 published by the Catholic Church in Rome was that of Carthage. Native Christianity is attested in the 15th century, though it was not in communion with the Catholic church.

The bishop of Morocco Lope Fernandez de Ain was made the head of the Church of Africa, the only church officially allowed to preach in the continent, on 19 December 1246 by Pope Innocent IV.

=== Modernity ===
In 1518, the Archdiocese of Carthage was revived as a Catholic titular see. It was briefly restored as a residential episcopal see 1884–1964, after which it was supplanted by the Roman Catholic Archdiocese of Tunis. The last titular Archbishop of Carthage, Agostino Casaroli, remained in office until 1979. Since then, the titular see has remained vacant.

== List of bishops ==
- Crescentius (c. 80)
- Epenetus (c. 115)
- Speratus (180)
- Optatus (203)
- Agrippinus (c. 240)
- Donatus I (?–248)
- Cyprian (248–258)
  - Maximus (251), Novatianist anti-bishop
  - Fortunatus (252), anti-bishop
- Lucianus (3rd century)
- Carpophorus (3rd century)
- Cyrus (3rd century)
- Caecilianus (311–325)
  - Majorinus (312 – c. 313), Donatist bishop
  - Donatus II (c. 313 – c. 350×355), Donatist bishop
- Rufus (337×340)
- Gratus (fl. 343/4–345×348)
  - Parmenianus (c. 350×355 – c. 391), Donatist bishop
- Restitutus (359)
- Geneclius (? – 390×393)
- Aurelius (fl. 393–426)
  - Primianus (c. 391), Donatist bishop
  - Maximianus (c. 392), Donatist bishop
- Capreolus (fl. 431–435)
- Quodvultdeus (c. 437 – c. 454)
- Deogratias (454–457/8)

sede vacante

- Eugenius (481–505)

sede vacante

- Boniface I (523 – c. 535)
- Reparatus (535–552)
- Primosus or Primasius (552 – c. 565)
- Publianus (fl. c. 565–581)
- Dominicus (fl. 592–601)
- Licinianus (d. 602)
- Fortunius
- Victor
- Gregory (fl. 646, 668)
- Maximus (mid-7th century)
- Felix (late 7th century)

sede vacante: 699?

- Theophilus, titular or exiled
- Stephen
- Boniface II (9th century)
- James (974×983)
- Thomas (1054)
- Cyriacus (1076)

== See also ==
- North Africa during Antiquity
- Early African church
- Primate of Africa
- Councils of Carthage
- Roman Catholic Archdiocese of Tunis

== Bibliography ==
- François Decret, Le christianisme en Afrique du Nord ancienne, Seuil, Paris, 1996 (ISBN 2020227746)
- Ekonomou, Andrew J. (2007). Byzantine Rome and the Greek Popes: Eastern influences on Rome and the papacy from Gregory the Great to Zacharias, A.D. 590–752. Lexington Books.
- Paul Monceaux, Histoire littéraire de l'Afrique chrétienne depuis les origines jusqu'à l'invasion arabe (7 volumes : Tertullien et les origines – saint Cyprien et son temps – le IV, d'Arnobe à Victorin – le Donatisme – saint Optat et les premiers écrivains donatistes – la littérature donatiste au temps de saint Augustin – saint Augustin et le donatisme), Paris, Ernest Leroux, 1920.
