= Victor Vitensis =

Roman African bishop (b. ca. 430)

Victor Vitensis (or Victor of Vita; born circa 430) was an African bishop of the Province of Byzacena (called Vitensis from his See of Vita). His importance rests on his Historia persecutionis Africanae Provinciae, temporibus Genserici et Hunirici regum Wandalorum (A History of the African Province Persecution, in the Times of Genseric and Huneric, the Kings of the Vandals).

== Life ==
Little is known of the author or his circumstances and so historians have put forward deductions based on the internal evidence of his work. It has been argued by John Moorhead that Victor wrote the Historia persecutionis whilst he was a priest in Carthage and that he 'had access to the archives of the See of Carthage'. The 'text originated in the Church of Carthage' and was published circa 488; however, scholars contend that Victor wrote much of his work in 484 but subsequently added perspectives from after Huneric's death. Danuta Shanzer has argued that the use of medical terminology in Victor's descriptions of torture indicate that he may have had a medical background. It is contested in academic discourse whether or not Victor was actually the bishop of Vita or simply born there.

== History ==
Victor is known for his Historia persecutionis Africanae Provinciae, temporibus Genserici et Hunirici regum Wandalorum (A History of the African Province Persecution, in the Times of Genseric and Huneric, the Kings of the Vandals). Divided into three books, the work is a predominantly contemporary narrative of the cruelties practiced against the orthodox Nicene Christians of Northern Africa by the Arian Vandals. The first book provides an account of the reign of Gaiseric, from the Vandal invasion of Africa in 429 until the king's death in 477; whilst, the second and third record events of Huneric's reign (477–484) – of which Victor was an eyewitness. Andy Merrills and Richard Miles have argued that with the work Victor 'created a coherent narrative of a Vandal persecution where previously there had been none'.

Victor throws much light on social and religious conditions in Carthage and on the African liturgy of the period, portraying 'the Vandals as being implacably and violently opposed to the true Catholic Faith'. His history contains many documents not otherwise accessible, e.g. the Confession of Faith drawn up for the orthodox bishops by Eugenius of Carthage and presented to Huneric at the conference in 484 of Catholic and Arian bishops. Two documents: a Passio beatissimorum martyrum qui apud Carthaginem passi sunt sub impio rege Hunerico (die VI. Non. Julias 484) and a Notitia Provinciarum et Civitatum Africae (List of the Provinces and Cities of Africa), formerly appended to all the manuscripts and now incorporated in the printed editions, are probably not Victor's. The former may be the work of one of his contemporaries. The latter is a list of the Catholic bishops who were summoned to the 484 conference and their Episcopal sees in the Latin provinces of North Africa, arranged according to provinces in this order: Africa Proconsularis, Numidia, Byzacena, Mauretania Caesariensis, Mauretania Sitifensis, Tripolitana, Sardinia.

=== Editions ===
- Early editions of Victor are found in Migne, Patrologia Latina, LVIII.
- Karl Felix Halm (Berlin, 1879) in Mon. Germ. Hist.: Auct. Antiq., III, 1; and Petchenig (Vienna, 1881); Corpus Scrip. Eccles. Lat., VII; Ferrere, De Victoris Vitensis libro qui inscribitur historia persecutionis Africanae Provinciae (Paris, 1898).

=== Translations ===
- Victor of Vita. History of the Vandal Persecution. Translated by John Moorhead, (Translated Texts for Historians; 10). Liverpool, 1992.

=== Studies ===
- A. H. Merrills, "totum subuertere uoluerunt: ‘social martyrdom’ in the Historia persecutionis of Victor of Vita", in Christopher Kelly, Richard Flower, Michael Stuart Williams (eds), Unclassical Traditions. Vol. II: Perspectives from East and West in Late Antiquity (Cambridge, Cambridge University Press, 2011) (Cambridge Classical Journal; Supplemental Volume 35), 102–115.
- Danuta Shanzer, 'Intentions and Audiences: History, Hagiography, Martyrdom, and Confession in Victor of Vita's Historia Persecutionis' in A.H. Merrills (ed.) Vandals, Romans and Berbers: New Perspectives on Late Antique North Africa (Aldershot, Ashgate Publishing Limited, 2004), pp. 271–290.
- Peter Heather, 'Christianity and the Vandals in the Reign of Geiseric', Bulletin of the Institute of Classical Studies 50 (2007), pp. 137–146.
