= Post-Vatican II Mass =

Post-Vatican II Mass may refer to:

- Preconciliar rites after the Second Vatican Council
- Mass of Paul VI
- Zaire Use
