= African Rite =

Defunct Christian, Latin liturgical rite

In the history of Christianity, the African Rite refers to a now defunct Christian, Latin liturgical rite, and is considered a development or possibly a local use of the primitive Roman Rite. Centered around the Archdiocese of Carthage in the Early African church, it used the Latin language.

The African Rite may be considered in two different periods: The ante-Nicene period when Christians were persecuted and could not freely develop forms of public worship, and when the liturgical prayers and acts had not become fixed; and the post-Nicene period when the simple, improvised forms of prayer gave way to more elaborate, set formularies, and the primitive liturgical actions evolved into grand and formal ceremonies.

== Background ==
The African liturgy was in use not only in the old Roman province of Africa of which Carthage was the capital, but also in Numidia and Mauretania -- in fact, in all of Northern Africa from the borders of Egypt west to the Atlantic Ocean, meaning the Early African church, centered around the Archdiocese of Carthage.

Christianity was introduced into proconsular Africa in the latter half of the 2nd century AD, probably by missionaries from Rome, and then spread rapidly through the other African provinces.

Although the language of the African Rite was Latin, it was modified by the introduction of many classical "Africanisms". Since it had been in use for at least more than a century before the Roman Church changed its official liturgical language from Koine Greek to the Latin idiom, it is probably the oldest Latin liturgical rite.

Since the African Church was dependent upon the bishopric of Rome, and since there was constant communication between Africa and Rome concerning ecclesiastical affairs, it may be supposed that liturgical questions were raised, different customs discussed, and the customs or formulas of one church adopted by the other.

A study of the African liturgy might thus be useful in tracing the origin and development of the different Latin liturgical rites, and to determine how one rite influenced (often enriched) another. The African liturgy seems to have influenced the Mozarabic and Gallican liturgies—similarities in phraseology show a common antique origin or a mutual dependence of the liturgies (possibly Antiochene and Coptic).

== Ante-Nicene period ==
No liturgical codices are extant - these were all lost due to the destruction of the Islamic invasion and due to the relatively rural character of the African regions, making the reconstruction of the ancient African liturgy difficult. Quotations and references from liturgical books and ceremonies are rare in the works of the early ecclesiastical writers and councils.

However, various sources illuminate customs which were peculiar to the African Church, as well as what formularies and ceremonies were common to all the Western churches:

- Two writers -- Tertullian and St. Cyprian -- furnish useful information on the African liturgy. Tertullian's writings are especially rich in descriptions of, and allusions to, ecclesiastical customs.
- The acts of the early martyrs, for example Saints Perpetua and Felicitas, are also illustrative.
- Finally, inscriptions on Christian (graveyard) monuments provide evidence on the beliefs and practices of the time.

=== Prayers ===
Christians' prayers were either private or liturgical. Privately they prayed every morning and evening, and many of them prayed frequently during the day—for example, at the third, sixth, and ninth hours, before meals, and before undertaking any unusual work or enterprise. The liturgical prayers were said chiefly during the reunions of the faithful to observe the vigils, or to celebrate the Agape feast and the Holy Eucharist (Mass).

These Christian assemblies in Africa seem to have been modelled on the same plans as those in other countries. To a certain degree, they imitated the Word services of the Jewish synagogue (including the solemn chanting of the readings), adding to it the Eucharistic service and some institutions specific to Christianity.

These gatherings were characterized by three elements: psalmody, the reading of passages from the Old and New Testaments, and prayer, to which a homily on the Scripture was generally added by the deacon, priest or bishop. Such meetings were sometimes distinct from the Mass, but sometimes they formed a preparation for the celebration of the divine mysteries.

The Church priests presided over the assembly, instructions and exhortations were given, prayers recited for the needs of the Church, the necessities of the brethren were considered and provided for, and various business pertaining to the Christian community was transacted, and finally, the Agape feast was probably - until entirely disappearing in the early 3rd century - celebrated as a fitting conclusion to a reunion of Christ's followers. The Agape feast seems to have been celebrated in Africa in the same manner as in other countries, and to have degenerated into an abuse to be suppressed here, as well as elsewhere. (Already the Apostle Paul condemned its abuses; these condemnations led to this custom to be suppressed by the apostolic Church or their immediate early successors.)

These liturgical meetings generally took place at night, or just before dawn, and hence Tertullian speaks of such an assembly as a coetus antelucanus, a "meeting before the dawn" (Apol., ii), while others speak of it as a vigil. The hour may have been chosen to enable Christians to evade their heathen persecutors, or to commemorate the time of the resurrection of Jesus.

The Christian liturgy, in a strict sense of the word, is the celebration of the Eucharist - involving unbloody sacrifice and a consummation. This generally followed the long prayers of a vigil. Traces of the ancient vigils survive in similarities with the preparatory part of today's Mass, or perhaps even more clearly in the first part of the Masses for the Ember days, or the Mass of the Pre-sanctified on Good Friday. Thus the Eucharist was celebrated very early in the morning ordinarily, and the regular day chosen for assisting at the Eucharist was on the - sacred - Sunday, in commemoration of the resurrection of Jesus.

=== Sabbath and feast days ===
The Sabbath, in the Jewish sense, was not observed by Christians during this early period. The Jewish festivals were also abandoned, as Tertullian (De idolatria, xiv) writes of the observance of festivals by Christians, "to whom Sabbaths are strange, and the new-moons and festivals formerly beloved by God". Sunday was now the Lord's day of the New Covenant, a day of rejoicing, on which it was forbidden to fast and to pray in a kneeling (penitential) posture: "We count fasting or kneeling in worship on the Lord's day to be unlawful". (Tert., De corona, iii.)

Since the resurrection of Jesus was honored on Sunday, it was only natural that Friday was considered appropriate for commemorating the passion and death of Christ. Hence the early Christians met for prayer on Friday, which was marked for meat abstinence and fasting in other Christian writings (Didache, Syria).

Christians also gathered on Wednesdays, but its origin as a meeting day cannot be accounted for. Tertullian referred to the Wednesday and Friday meetings as stations (stationes). In Africa, it appears to have been customary to celebrate the Eucharist on station days, although it does not seem to have been the practice in other churches. However, these were days of fasting in churches everywhere. Since fasting lasted only until the ninth hour, the liturgy would be celebrated and communion distributed about that time in the afternoon.

Of all Sundays, the feast of Easter was the greatest and was celebrated with special solemnity. Good Friday, called by Tertullian "Pascha", was a day of strict fasting which continued through Holy Saturday. Even though Good Friday was a preparation for the feast of Easter, it was the most solemn vigil during the year, and the one on which all vigils were modelled.

Holy Saturday does not seem to have had any special liturgical service assigned, the present service being the ancient Easter vigil anticipated. The Easter vigil may have been so solemnly observed because of the traditional belief that Jesus would return to judge the world on the feast of Easter, and early Christians hoped He would find them vigilant, prepared and praying.

Easter in Tertullian's time was followed by fifty days of rejoicing until Pentecost (gift of the Holy Ghost), which was considered the close of the Easter season rather than a solemn feast with a special significance.

In the 3rd century (200-300 AD), Lent, as a period of forty days fasting, was unknown in Africa. Of the greater feasts of the liturgical year, the earlier writers appear to know nothing -- Christmas (Nativity), the Circumcision of Jesus, the Epiphany, the festivals of the Blessed Virgin and the feasts of the Apostles do not seem to have been celebrated in the African Church, or at least not with special solemnity.

Festivals of local Christian martyrs seem to have taken precedence over what are now regarded as the greatest feasts of the Church, and their anniversaries were celebrated with great solemnity long before the immovable feasts were introduced. Only at a much later date were commemorations of foreign saints made. The early Christians had a great devotion towards the martyrs and confessors of the Christian faith, carefully preserved and venerated their relics, made pilgrimages to their tombs, and sought to be buried as near as possible to the relics of the martyrs. Thus the calendar of the African Church in the ante-Nicene period contained a comparatively small number of feast days.

=== The Eucharist ===
The most important liturgical function is the celebration of Mass, or the Eucharist. The African Church seems to have divided the Mass into the Mass of the catechumens, and the Mass of the faithful. Among the orthodox Christians, the catechumens were rigidly excluded from assisting at the propitiatory sacrifice of the Eucharist (Mass of the faithful).

Bread and wine were - and are - used as the matter of the sacrament, but a little water was already in early times added to the wine to signify the union of the people with Christ. St. Cyprian severely condemned bishops who used only water in the chalice, declaring that water is not the essential matter of the sacrifice and its exclusive use renders the sacrament invalid.

Both Tertullian's and St. Cyprian's writings have passages which seem to give the form of the Eucharist in the very words of Christ as quoted in Sacred Scripture. Sometimes there is great similarity between the African Rite's words and the phraseology of the still existing and still used Roman Canon. There are allusions to a Preface, the Sanctus, the "commemoration" of Jesus Christ, the Pater noster, and to different acclamations. These elements are found in all apostolic and early Christian liturgies.

Tertullian speaks often of the kiss of peace, and considers the ceremony very important. References are also made to a litany which was recited during the Mass, but no precise information is given concerning its place in the liturgy.

At Mass the faithful received holy communion under the species of bread from the bishop or priest, and under the species wine from the deacon holding the chalice, and each one, after receiving communion, answered "Amen" to profess his faith in the sacrament (Real Presence). Sometimes the faithful carried the Host home, and there communicated themselves, especially in times of persecution by the Roman Emperors.

Christians receiving Communion were expected to be fasting and free of serious sin. They practiced frequent Communion, especially during persecutions. It was considered sacrilegious for the consecrated bread or wine to fall on the ground or be touched by ordinary materials.

=== Baptism ===
Baptism, as the initiatory rite of Christianity, is mentioned frequently by the early writers; Tertullian wrote a special treatise on this sacrament, describing the preparation required for it, and the ceremonies accompanying it- "The catechumens should prepare for the reception of baptism by frequent prayers, by fasts, and vigils." Although he usually speaks of the baptism of adults, he admits the baptism of infants but seems somewhat opposed to the practice, which was commended by St. Cyprian, the latter holding baptism of children to be essential for their eternal salvation.

Easter, or any day between Easter and Pentecost, was the time set for the solemn administration of baptism, but Tertullian declares that as every day belongs to the Lord it might be conferred at any time. He holds that it should be administered by the bishop, who, however, may delegate a priest or deacon to act in his place, although in certain cases he would permit laymen to baptize.

Any kind of water may serve as the matter of the sacrament, and the water is used to baptize the catechumen "in the name of the Father and of the Son and of the Holy Ghost". The mode of baptizing was by triple immersion in a large font, which had already been blessed by a minister.

Many symbolic ceremonies accompanied the rite of baptism. Before the baptismal candidate entered the font, he renounced the devil and his angels. There was also a creed to be recited by the candidate for baptism, probably an African form of the Apostles' Creed or an enriched version of the latter.

Tertullian gives several different forms of this rule of faith. After the neophyte ascended from the font he received a drink of milk and honey, and was then anointed with consecrated oil. Tertullian also states that the neophyte was signed with the sign of the cross, that he received the imposition of hands with the invocation of the Holy Ghost. This is a clear description of the sacrament now called confirmation or chrismation. According to Tertuallian's testimony, the newly baptized Christian would then immediately receive his first holy communion during the eucharistic liturgy.

Tertullian explains many of these ceremonies in his Treatise On the Resurrection (viii): "The flesh indeed is washed in order that the soul may be cleansed; the flesh is anointed, that the soul may be consecrated; the flesh is signed (with the sign of the cross) that the soul too may be fortified; the flesh is shadowed with the imposition of hands, that the soul also may be illuminated by the Spirit; the flesh feeds on the Body and Blood of Christ, that the soul likewise may fatten on its God."

=== Penance ===
The testimonies relating to the Sacrament of Penance describe the public penances imposed for grievous sins, and the absolution of the penitents after the public penances had been completed to the satisfaction of the Church.

Tertullian at first asserted that the Church had the power of forgiving all kinds of sins, but after becoming a Montanist he denied that this power extended to certain heinous crimes. Later, he ridiculed the practice of the Pope and the Roman Church, who did not deny absolution to any truly penitent Christian.

Though he writes sarcastically of the procedure in use in Rome in the time of Pope St. Callixtus, also describes seriously the manner in which a penitent sinner was absolved and readmitted into communion with the faithful. He narrates how the penitent, "clothed in a hair-shirt and covered with ashes, appears before the assembly of the faithful craving absolution, how he prostrates himself before the priests and widows, seizes the hem of their garments, kisses their footprints, clasps them by the knees", how the bishop in the meantime, addresses the people, exhorting them by the recital of the parable of the lost sheep to be merciful and show pity to the poor penitent who asks for pardon. The bishop prayed for the penitents, and the bishop and priests imposed hands upon them as a sign of absolution and restoration into the communion of the Church.

Elsewhere in his writings, Tertullian mentions doing penance in sack-cloth and ashes, of weeping for sins, and of asking the forgiveness of the faithful. St. Cyprian also writes of the different acts of penance, of the confession of sin, of the manner in which the public penance was performed, of the absolution given by the priest, and of the imposition of the hands of the bishop and priests through which the penitents regained their rights in the Church.

=== Marriage ===
Tertullian speaks of the nuptial blessing pronounced by the Church on the marriage of Christians, asking "how he could sufficiently extol the happiness of that marriage which is cemented by the Church, confirmed by the oblation, sealed with the benediction [blessing], which the angels proclaim, which is ratified by the Heavenly Father". Christian marriage thus seems to have been celebrated publicly before the Church with more or less solemnity (including the offering of a special mass: "confirmed by the Oblation"), but the nuptial blessing would appear to have been optional and not obligatory, except perhaps by force of custom.

=== Ordination ===
Both Tertullian and St. Cyprian mention ordination and the various holy orders in the ecclesiastical hierarchy, but unfortunately do not give much information which is strictly liturgical. Tertullian speaks of bishops, priests, and deacons whose powers and functions are pretty well defined, who are chosen on account of their exemplary conduct by the brethren, and are then consecrated to God by regular ordination. Only those who are ordained, says St. Cyprian, may baptize and grant pardon of sins. St. Cyprian distinguishes the different orders, mentioning bishops, priests, deacons, sub-deacons, acolytes, exorcists, and lectors, and in describing the election of Pope St. Cornelius at Rome declares that Cornelius was promoted from one order to another until finally he was elected by the votes of all to the supreme pontificate (bishop of Rome). All the orders except the minor order of ostiary are enumerated by the early African writers. Both exorcists and lectors appear to have occupied a much more important liturgical position in the early ages in both African and Roman churches than in later times in the Roman Church. The exorcist, for example, was frequently called upon to exercise the power against the devil he had received at ordination. Tertullian speaks of this extraordinary power which was exercised in the name of Christ. Sometimes the exorcist used the rite of exsufflation, and sometimes, as St. Cyprian states, adjured the evil spirit to depart per Deum verum (by the true God). Lectors also had many liturgical functions to perform. The lector, for example, recited the lessons from the Old and New Testaments, and possibly even read (parts of) the Gospel from the pulpit to the people. In later ages his duties were divided, and some were given to the other ministers, some to regular chanters.

=== Burial ===
Among other liturgical ceremonies the early writers often allude to the rites accompanying the burial of the dead, and particularly the entombment of the bodies of the martyrs and confessors. From the earliest times the Christians showed great reverence to the bodies of the faithful, embalmed them with incense and spices, and buried them carefully in distinctively Christian cemeteries. Prayers were said for the repose of the souls of the dead, Masses were offered especially on the anniversary of death and their names were recited in the Memento of the Mass (to alleviate possible temporal punishments these souls still possibly endured), provided that they had lived in accordance with Christian ideals. The faithful were taught not to mourn for their dead, but to rejoice that the souls of those departed in Faith and grace, were already living with God and enjoying peace and refreshing happiness after their earthly trials and labours. Tertullian, St. Cyprian, and the Acts of St. Perpetua, all give testimony to the antiquity of these customs. The cemeteries in Africa (called areae) were not catacombs like those in Rome, but above ground in the open air, and often had a chapel (cella) adjoining them, where the (sometimes secret) reunions of the faithful took place on the anniversaries of the martyrs and of the other Christians who were buried there. The inscriptions on the tombs often state that the departed had lived a life of Christian peace, in pace vixit, or often express their faith and hope of the faithful in a future life of happiness together with the Lord--spes in Deo--in Deo vivas.

St. Augustine in the 4th century also insists, that the normally dead Christian faithful should be prayed for during the Eucharist's Memento "at our altars", but forbade to pray for the martyrs - these heroes were believed to be immediately with God after their deaths.

=== Ceremonial acts ===
Finally, some ceremonial acts might be considered to which reference is often made by the early writers. Prayers were said sometimes kneeling, sometimes standing; for example, on Sundays, and during the fifty days following Easter, it was forbidden to kneel, while on fast days the kneeling posture was considered appropriate. The Christians prayed with the arms stretched out somewhat in the form of a cross. The sign of the cross was made very frequently, often on some object with the intention of blessing it, often on the forehead of Christians to invoke God's protection and assistance. Tertullian in his "De Corona" writes: "At every forward step and movement, at every going in and out, when we put on our clothes and shoes, when we bathe, when we sit at table, when we light the lamps, on couch, on seat, in all ordinary actions of daily life, we trace upon the forehead the sign of the cross". The early Christians were also accustomed to strike their breasts in sign of guilt and contrition for sin. Tertullian believed that the kiss of peace should be given often; in fact, that it should accompany every prayer and ceremony. Not only are there many ceremonial acts such as those just mentioned which existed in the 3rd century and have been preserved even to the present in the liturgy, but there are also many phrases and acclamations of the early African Church which have found a permanent place in the liturgical formularies. These expressions, and perhaps also the measured style in which they were composed, may have had considerable influence in the development of the other Latin liturgies.

== Post-Nicene period ==
After Constantine I's Edict of Milan, granting freedom of worship to the Christian religion, and especially after the Council of Nicaea, there was a great development in the liturgy of the Church. It was only natural that for some time after the foundation of the new religion, its liturgy should contain only the essentials of Christian worship, and that in the course of time it should develop and expand its ritual according to the needs of the people. Moreover, the first period was an age of persecution and hence the ceremonial was necessarily curtailed. While gold, silver, incense and precious clothes for the ministers had their origins in the earliest time of the Church, they became increasingly more expensive, like the churches and chapels became large edifices instead of home or graveyard oratories. So when persecution ceased, the Church began immediately to expand her ceremony, changing and modifying the old forms and introducing new rites according to the requirements of public liturgical worship, so that the liturgy would be more dignified, more magnificent, and more impressive. In the beginning great liberty was allowed the individual celebrant to improvise the prayers of the liturgy, provided that he adhered to the strict form in essentials and followed the theme demanded, but at a later date, the Church felt the need of a set of formularies and fixed ceremonies, lest dogmatic errors should find expression in the liturgy and thus corrupt the faith of the people. In the 4th century all these tendencies to expansion and development are very noticeable in all the liturgies. This is true, also, of the Church in what is now called North Africa in the second period of the history of the African liturgy which embraces the fourth, fifth, sixth, and 7th centuries to the beginning of the 8th century, when Christianity in (North) Africa practically disappeared with the rise of Islam in the region. No liturgical books or codices belonging to this period are extant, so the liturgy must be reconstructed from contemporary writings and monuments. Of the writers of the period St. Augustine, bishop of Hippo (354-430) is richest in allusions to ceremonies and formularies, but St. Optatus, Marius Victorinus, Arnobius, and Victor Vitensis give some useful information. The inscriptions, which are more numerous in this period, and the archaeological discoveries also furnish some liturgical data.

The beginning of a real ecclesiastical calendar, with definitely fixed feasts and fasts, now appears. The great feast of Easter, upon which all the movable feasts depended, is celebrated with even greater solemnity than in the time of Tertullian. Before Easter there was a period of forty days' preparation, devoted to fasting and other works of penance. The vigil of Easter was celebrated with the usual ritual, but the length of the offices seems to have been increased. The Paschal solemnity was followed by a season of fifty days' rejoicing until Pentecost day, which, in the 4th century, appears to have a distinctive character as the commemoration of the descent of the Holy Ghost upon the Apostles rather than as the close of the Easter season. In Holy Week, Holy Thursday commemorated the institution of the Eucharist, and according to St. Augustine, besides the morning Mass, a Mass was also celebrated in the evening in order to carry out all the circumstances of the institution at the Last Supper. Good Friday was observed by attending the long liturgical offices, while Holy Saturday was celebrated in about the same manner as in the time of Tertullian. Ascension Day seems to have been introduced in the 4th century (though possibly earlier in churches elsewhere), but in the time of St. Augustine it was already universally observed. As for the immovable feasts, Christmas and Epiphany, which were unknown or seemed unimportant to Tertullian, were celebrated already with the greatest solemnity in the early 5th century. The first of January was observed not as the feast of the Circumcision, but as a fast day which had been instituted for the purpose of turning the people away from the celebration of the pagan festivities which still took place at that time of the year by the still numerous pagans of the Roman Empire. (Only after 389 AD would the pagan 1 January festivals cease.) Feasts of other than local saints were introduced, for instance, immediately after Christmas, the feast of St. Stephen the Proto-Martyr, of the Holy Innocents of Bethlehem and of Sts. James and John, and later in the year, the feasts of St. John the Baptist, of Sts. Peter and Paul, of the holy Maccabees, of St. Lawrence, St. Vincent, etc. The festivals of the local martyrs were celebrated with even greater solemnity than in early times, and were often accompanied by luxurious secular feasting after the church services (drinking, singing and eating) which was frequently condemned in some sermons of the time, on account of abuses. When such a large number of feasts was annually observed, it was to be expected that a list or calendar would be drawn up, and, in truth, a calendar was drawn up for the use of the Church of Carthage in the beginning of the 6th century, from which very important information concerning the institution and history of the great feast days may be obtained.

When Christianity received legal recognition in the Roman Empire (313 AD), Christians began to construct churches and adorn them to serve their purpose. Most of these were built in the old basilica style, with some few differences. The churches were dedicated in honour of the holy martyrs frequently, and relics of the martyrs were placed beneath the altars. The inscriptions of the period mention the dedication to the martyrs and also the fact that the relics were placed in the church or in the altar. The altar itself, called mensa (table), was generally made of wood, but sometimes of stone, and was covered over with linen cloths. There was a special rite for dedicating churches and also for consecrating altars, in which blessed water and the sign of the cross were used. The blessing and consecrating took place by the bishop.

The Mass became a daily function celebrated every morning when the Christians could meet frequently without fear of persecution, and when the increased number of feasts required a more frequent celebration of the liturgical offices. Little is known with precision and certitude of the composition of the different parts of the African post-Nicene Mass, but still there are many allusions in various authors which give some valuable information. The Mass of the catechumens consisted of psalms and lessons from the Scriptures. These lessons were chosen from both the Old and New Testaments, and it would seem that there were three lessons as in some of the Oriental liturgies, one from the Old Testament, one from the Epistles in the New Testament, and one from the Gospels. The Third Council of Carthage decreed that only lessons from the canonical books of Scripture or from the acts of the martyrs on their feast days might be read in the churches. Between the Epistle and Gospel a psalm containing some idea in harmony with the feast of the day was recited, and corresponded to the gradual or tract in the Roman Mass. An alleluia was also sung, more or less solemnly, especially on Sundays and during the fifty days' prolongation of the Easter festival. The lessons from the Scriptures were generally followed by a homily, after which both the catechumens and the penitents were dismissed, and the Mass of the faithful commenced. This rule of dismissing the catechumens, etc., seems to have been strictly observed, since nearly all the Northwest African writers in their sermons or other works use expressions which indicate that their words would be intelligible only to the initiated, and that the catechumens were ignorant of the mysteries celebrated in the Mass of the faithful. The litany may have been recited after the Gospel, although its precise position cannot be determined with certainty. The litany consisted of short petitions for the various needs of the Church, resembling somewhat the petitions in the present Roman Rite Litany of the Saints, or perhaps the prayers for different classes of persons, or necessities of the Church which are now recited on Good Friday. The people probably responded with an acclamation like Kyrie eleison, or - more logically - Te rogamus audi nos.

In the time of St. Augustine a chant for the Offertory was introduced in the Church of Carthage; it consisted of a psalm having some reference to the oblation, and was sung while the people were making their offerings to the Church/liturgy (money, goods). Each of the faithful was supposed to bring an offering for his or her holy communion. The offerings, pure wheat bread and wine, were received by the bishop and placed upon the altar, with the appropriate prayers, and then the bishop proceeded with the Mass. Other offerings were put down before the sacred space around the altar, not inside it. The Latin-spoken Dominus vobiscum preceded the Preface. The canon of the Mass was known in Africa as the actio, or agenda, and was mentioned but very seldom on account of the "discipline of the secret". There are, however, some passages in the African writers which show that there was a great similarity between the African actio and the Roman Eucharistic Canon, so much so that some of the texts when put in juxtaposition are almost identical. The actio contained the usual prayers, the commemoration for the living and the dead, the words of institution and sanctification of the sacrifice, the commemoration of Christ's life, the Pater Noster, and the preparation for Communion. The Pater Noster seems to have held the same position that it now has in the Roman canon, and it was said before the Communion, as St. Augustine states, because in the Lord's Prayer we beseech God to forgive our offences, and thus we may approach the communion table with better dispositions. The kiss of peace followed shortly after the Pater Noster, and was closely connected with the Communion, being regarded as a symbol of the fraternal union existing between all those who partook of the Body and Blood of Christ, being united through Him. The faithful received communion frequently, and were encouraged in the practice of receiving daily communion. At the proper time the communicants approached the altar and there partook of the Eucharist under both species, answering "Amen" to the formula pronounced by the priest in order to profess their faith in the sacrament just received. During the distribution of communion the thirty-third psalm was recited or sung, because that psalm contained some verses considered appropriate for the Communion. Prayers of thanksgiving were then said, and the people dismissed from the church with a benediction (presbyteral or episcopal blessing in the form of the cross).

The prayers accompanying the administration of the other sacraments seem to have become more fixed and to have lengthened since the time of Tertullian. For the more decorous and convenient administration of the Sacrament of Baptism, large adorned baptisteries were erected, in which the ceremony was carried out with great solemnity. The African Church seems to have followed practically the same ritual as the Roman Church during the catechumenate, which lasted for the forty days preceding Easter. St. Augustine, for instance, speaks of teaching the catechumens the Apostles' Creed and the Lord's Prayer (Our Father), and of the rites for the Vigil of Easter, as if they were in accord with those in use at Rome; but there appears to be only one unction with sacred oil, that after baptism, and the kiss of peace after baptism is still given as in the days of St. Cyprian. Victor Vitensis asserts that the African Church admitted the feast of the Epiphany as a day appointed for the solemn administration of baptism according to the custom prevailing in the Oriental churches. The neophytes were confirmed after baptism through the imposition of hands and the unction with chrism on the forehead in the form of a cross, and on the same day they seem to have received their first holy communion with about the same ceremonies as in the ante-Nicene period of persecutions. The rite for the Sacrament of Penance shows few peculiarities in Africa; public penances were imposed and the reconciliation of penitents was effected in the same manner as in the age of Tertullian. (By personal, often public, confession and absolution by the bishop, incidentally by the priest, after a long time of penitential fasting.)

Matrimony is often mentioned, especially by St. Augustine, who speaks of the nuptial blessing and the various other ceremonies, civil and religious, connected with it.

As the Sacrament of Holy Orders had a more public character like the Eucharist, it is frequently alluded to in the writings and inscriptions of the post-Nicene time. Allusions are made to the various orders and to ordination, but there is scarcely ever a description of the rite of ordination, or an explanation of the formulas. It might be noted that the archdeacon now appears and has special functions assigned to him. Clerics began their ecclesiastical career as lectors often at a tender (very young) age, and the lectors formed a schola (school of cantors), which sang the ecclesiastical offices in Latin chant. Later on, the lectors became chanters, and their duties were given to the other ministers. St. Augustine also speaks frequently of the ceremony of the consecration of virgins, which seems to have been reserved to the bishops. The veil might be received by female faithful at a much younger age in Africa than at Rome.

The faithful showed the same loving care and respect to the bodies of the departed as in the ante-Nicene period, but now the funeral rites were longer and more solemn. Prayers were said for the dead as before, Mass was also offered for the souls of the faithful departed, and special rites took place while the funeral procession was on the way and when the body was entombed. The names of the dead were recited in the diptychs, and special proto-Requiem Mass was offered for them on the anniversaries of death. Moreover, the inscriptions of this age contain beautiful sentiments of hope in a happy future life for those who had lived and died in the peace of the Lord, and beseech God to grant eternal rest and beatitude to those who trust in His mercy. Many of these expressions are very similar to the phrases now used in the Roman Rite during the obsequies of the dead.

The Divine Office was gradually developing, but was still in a very rudimentary state. It consisted of the recitation or chanting of psalms and canticles, of versicles and acclamations, and the reading of portions of the Scriptures. There was a special collection of canticles taken from the Old Testament in use in the African Church, and perhaps, also, a collection of hymns of St. Ambrose. Many of the versicles quoted in the writings of the time may be now found in the present Roman liturgy. St. Augustine was evidently opposed to the growing tendency to abandon the simple recitative tone and make the chant of the offices more solemn, complex and ornate as the ceremonial became more formal. Gradually the formularies became more fixed, and liberty to improvise was curtailed by the African councils. Few, however, of the prayers have been preserved, although many shorter verses and acclamations have been quoted in the writings of the period, as for example, the Deo Gratias, Deo Laudes, and Amen, with which the people approved the words of the preacher, or the doxologies and conclusions of some of the prayers. The people still used the sign of the cross frequently in their private devotions as in the more difficult days of Tertullian (when the Christians were still under persecution). Other ceremonial acts in common use were striking the breast as a sign of penance, extending the arms in the form of a cross (especially clerics during the liturgy did so), kneeling during prayers, etc., all of which had been handed down from primitive times. Such are some of the most important data furnished by the early writers and inscriptions concerning the liturgy of the African Church, and they are useful to show the peculiarities of the Latin liturgical rites in Africa (now: North Africa, except originally Alexandrian Rite Egypt) as well as the similarity between the African and other liturgies.

== See also ==
- Early African church
- Latin liturgical rites
- Catholic order rites
- Zaire Use
