= Primian of Carthage =

4th-century Christian Bishop of Carthage

Primian (Primianus) was an early Christian Bishop of Carthage, and leader of the Donatist movement in Roman North Africa. Seen as a moderate by some in his faction, he was a controversial figure in a time of fragmentation of the Donatists, a reactionary branch of Christianity.

== Biography ==
He was the Bishop of Carthage, and hence the leader of the Donatist movement in Roman North Africa.

He had succeeded Parmenian as bishop in about 391, winning a tightly fought election for the role. His rival, Maximian, a relative of the founder of their movement, saw him as a lax and conformist appeaser.

The rivalry did not end with the election. In 393 a council was called by Maximian where forty of the sixty-five Donatist bishops sided with Maximianus over Primian, causing a split in the Donatist ranks. He was accused of readmitting the Claudianist faction back to the Donatist movement. Three years of proceedings in the Roman civil courts saw Primian retake Maximianist-held basilicas in Musti, Assuras and Membressa. A number of the bishops split with Primian to follow Maximianus, forming their own short-lived schism.

Primian attended the Council of Bagai, at which he is said to have taunted his opponents. He also attended the Council of Carthage (411), where he made comment condemning the actions of Cyprian, the Donatist bishop of Tubursica, for immorality.

Religious titles
Preceded by Parmenian	Donatist Bishop of Carthage; 391 or 392–412	Succeeded by None
