= Proculus, bishop of Marseilles =

Proculus is the second attested bishop of Marseilles in southern Gaul, apparently in office from 380 to 430 AD. Ambitious and petulant, he refused the leadership of the bishop of Aix, capital of the province of Viennensis Secunda to which Marseilles was suffragan. Opposed also to Patroclus, bishop of Arles, then primate of the Gaulish hierarchy, Proculus established two village bishoprics at the limit of his territory and subject to his authority. Pope Zosimus tried to restrain him, but with Zosimus' death (417AD) the issue petered out.
