= Post-Tridentine Mass =

Post-Tridentine Mass may refer to:

- Tridentine Mass
- Preconciliar rites after the Second Vatican Council
- Mass of Paul VI
- Zaire Use

== See also ==
- Council of Trent
