= Deogratias (bishop) =

Bishop of Carthage

Saint Deogratias

Bishop
- Died: 457; Carthage
- Venerated in: Roman Catholicism
- Feast: 5 January and 22 March

Deogratias of Carthage was a North African Christian prelate who served as Bishop of Carthage from 454 to 457.

== Life ==
The name Deogratias means "thanks be to God." In Africa, it was the salutation used by the Catholics to distinguish themselves from the Donatists who said: Deo laudes (St. Augustine, In Ps. cxxxi). Therefore, in Africa Deo Gratias occurs as a Catholic name, e.g. St. Deogratias.

He was appointed a bishop, because there was no bishop for 14 years since the last bishop Quodvultdeus and priests had been arrested and banished by Genseric, the Homoian king of the Vandals, who captured the city of Carthage in 439. Deogratias sold all the gold, silver, vessels, works of art, vestments and ornaments of the church to buy the slaves back from the vandals and filled two of the largest churches in the city, the Basilica Fausti and the Basilica Novarum, with bedding to provide accommodation and also started a mess to provide daily food to them. He died in 457 at Carthage.

After him the seat was empty for many years until Saint Eugenius of Carthage because the Vandals did not allow another bishop for 23 years. His feast is celebrated on 5 January and 22 March. He was buried secretly to avoid chaos as people had gathered in numbers at his funeral to get a relic of the saint.
