= Missa Luba =

Setting of the Latin Mass in Congolese style

The Missa Luba is a setting of the Latin Mass sung in styles traditional to the Democratic Republic of the Congo. It was composed by Fr Guido Haazen, a Franciscan friar from Belgium, and originally celebrated, performed, and recorded in 1958 by Les Troubadours du Roi Baudouin (English: "King Baudouin's Troubadours"), a choir of adults and children from Kamina, Katanga Province. It would later become the partial basis for a Congolese usage of the Ordinary Form of the Roman Rite Mass, the Zaire Use.

== Background ==
Father Guido Haazen O.F.M. (Order of Friars Minor) (b. 27 September 1921, d. 20 August 2004) became director of Kamina Central School in what was then the Belgian Congo in September 1953. Within weeks he established an ensemble consisting of a male choir – about forty-five boys aged nine to fourteen and fifteen adults – and percussion. In 1957 he received royal consent to name the ensemble Les Troubadours du Roi Baudouin in honour of the Belgian king Baudouin I. In the same year Haazen and the Baluba people of Kasai and Katanga began developing the Missa Luba from collective improvisations on traditional song forms. It was first celebrated at the Catholic mission of St. Bavo in Kamina on 23 March 1958. The next day, the ensemble left for a tour of Europe, performing the Mass and Congolese folk music in Belgium (where they gave concerts at the Brussels World's Fair, the Netherlands, and Germany (where they sang with the Vienna Boys Choir). The celebrated recording of the Missa Luba by the Troubadours and soloist Joachim Ngoi, a teacher at Kamina Central School, was made at this time.

== Elements ==
=== Music ===
The music for the Mass was not written down. Father Haazen responded to demand from choirs wanting to perform the piece by publishing a transcription of the recorded version in 1964, with a new edition in 1969.

The Kyrie is in the style of a kasala, a Luba song of mourning. The Gloria is improvised in the Kiluba style characteristic of Katanga. The Credo, the longest section of the Mass, is based on five different folk songs linked by improvisations. The vocal part of the Credo referring to the crucifixion of Jesus is preceded by the customary announcement of death, first on the kyondo (log drum), then on the kikumvi (tom-tom). There follows a kilio (elegy) without percussion accompaniment, sung by the solo voice. The Sanctus and the Benedictus were inspired by a Bantu farewell song. The Hosanna is a rhythmic dance of Kasai, and the Agnus Dei is a typical Bena Luluwa song, such as might be heard around Kananga.

=== Dance ===
The choreography for the Mass was done by Eleo Pomare.

== Zaire Use ==
The Missa Luba formed the partial basis for a Congolese usage of the Ordinary Form of the Roman Rite Mass, originally known as the Zaire Use (during the era when the DRC temporarily renamed). Now known as the Congolese Use, the liturgical form was for many years the only newly approved form of the Roman Rite since the Second Vatican Council, having received approbation from the Holy See in 1988. The use, and some of its various elements, have been adopted in various churches outside of the Congo region. In 2019, the Zaire Use was celebrated with Pope Francis.

== In popular culture ==
The Gloria featured in Pier Paolo Pasolini's The Gospel According to St. Matthew (1964). The Kyrie was used in the Mexican film Un alma pura (1965) and the MGM film The Singing Nun (1966). The Sanctus featured prominently in Lindsay Anderson's 1968 film if.... starring Malcolm McDowell, with which the Mass was for a time closely identified. It was also used in the telemovie Deadly Voyage (1996), in which it accompanied the closing credits; in Lost and Delirious (2001); and in Never Let Me Go (2010).

Following its appearance in if...., a single of the Troubadours' Sanctus, named "Sanctus (from Missa Luba)", was released and reached number 34 on the UK Singles Chart in March 1969; running for only one minute and 31 seconds in length, it was perhaps the shortest hit single in the country's history.

The Kyrie received regular play at The Loft, an influential underground dance party founded in New York City in 1969. The Loft's host David Mancuso selected music that was soulful, rhythmic, and imparted words of hope, redemption, and pride. Missa Luba in particular appealed to Mancuso's, "affection both for music with an explicit spiritual message and for African percussion."

The Clash refer to the recording in the lyrics of "Car Jamming" on their 1982 album Combat Rock. The cover of the Troubadours' album appears briefly in the Stanley Kubrick film A Clockwork Orange (1971) as Malcolm McDowell's character, Alex, strolls through a record shop.

The Missa Luba was the most successful of many world music Masses created in the 1950s and 1960s. It eclipsed the earlier Messe des Savanes (1956) arranged by Abbé Robert Wedraogho in Upper Volta (now Burkina Faso) and gave rise to several imitations, including the Misa Criolla (1964) arranged by Ariel Ramírez and the Misa Flamenca (1966) arranged by Ricardo Fernández de Latorre and José Torregrosa.

In the authoritative music magazine Mojo, the Belgian-Congolese record Missa Luba of Les Troubadours du Roi Baudouin is mentioned as one of the ten albums that 'made' the sound of Led Zeppelin.

Guitarist Erik Brann based the structure of the song "In-A-Gadda-Da-Vida" upon Missa Luba, particularly the lengthy drum solo.

== Original recording ==
Philips Records released a ten-inch LP of the Missa Luba by Les Troubadours du Roi Baudouin in the Netherlands and other European markets in 1958. The track list was:

Side A: Congolese songs

1. Dibwe Diambula Kabanda (Marriage Song) – 3:02
2. Lutuku & A Bene Kanyoka (Emergence from Grief) – 2:48
3. Ebu Ewale Kemai (Marriage Ballad) – 2:22
4. Katunbo (Dance) – 1:42
5. Seya Wa Mama Ndalamba (Marital Celebration) – 2:21
6. Banaha (Soldiers' Song) – 2:01
7. Twai Tshinaminai (Work Song) – 1:01

Side B: Missa Luba

1. Kyrie – 2:03
2. Gloria – 2:39
3. Credo – 4:06
4. Sanctus – 1:36
5. Benedictus – 0:52
6. Agnus Dei – 1:52

This program was retained for reissues throughout the early 1960s, including the first U.K. release (1964) and the first U.S. release (1965), and has also been carried over into the digital reissues of more recent times (CD and download) – except that the Missa Luba now sometimes precedes the songs.

Philips capitalised on the exposure the music received in if.... by releasing the Sanctus and Benedictus as a single, which spent eleven weeks in the British charts, peaking at No. 28 in March 1969.

Some twelve-inch LP versions of the album issued later in the 1960s contained additional material from the 1958 sessions, including:

Sacred music

- Ave Maria (Jacques Arcadelt) – 2:30
- Mbali Kule (Gloria in Excelsis Deo) – 2:44
- O Jesu Christe (Jacquet de Berchem) – 3:57

Children's songs from the Baluba

- Kamiole – 1:10
- Katende – 1:04
- Kilio
- Kamuyambi – 1:22
- Daina – 1:08

More Congolese songs

- Kamimbi (Kiluba) – 1:42
- Maningi Daba (Kiswahili) – 1:75
- Mikomba (Tshiluba) – 2:02
- Salibona (Kiswahili) – 2:42
- Kansembe (Kiluba)
- Tambwe Dishinda (Tshiluba) – 1:32

No single issue has brought all of this material together. The most complete version is The Original Missa Luba and Songs from the Congo released by Universal in 1999, which contains an expanded program of twenty-two Congolese songs and the Missa Luba, but omits several of the previously released songs and the other three sacred pieces.

The Troubadours' recording of the Missa Luba has also been reissued in various couplings with the Misa Criolla, Misa Flamenca, and Messe des Savanes performed by other artists.

There are later recordings of the Mass by the Muungano National Choir of Nairobi (Philips, 1990) and the Choral Arts Society of Washington (Naxos, 2006).

== See also ==
- African Sanctus
