= Apiarius of Sicca =

African Christian priest

Apiarius of Sicca was an African Christian priest convicted by the Bishops of Africa of numerous unspecified crimes in the early 5th century AD, and excommunicated by Bishop Urbanus of Sicca Veneria.

== Appeal to the bishop of Rome ==
In 418, Apiarius appealed his convictions directly to Pope Zosimus (Term of Office: March 417-December 418), bypassing the African Bishops appeals system. Pope Zosimus, citing what he claimed was a canon of the First Council of Nicaea, sent legates to assess the charges.

However, the African bishops cast doubt on the authenticity of the canon used, i.e. "When a bishop thinks he has been unjustly deposed by his colleagues he may appeal to Rome, and the Roman bishop shall have the business decided by judices in partibus". The African bishops were right, since the canon was not one of the Nicene canons, but rather a canon from the Latin version of the Sardica canons.

"the affair of the priest Apiarius, where the legitimacy of the appeals to Rome was called into question, prompted the need for a collection of oriental canons and the constitution of two dossiers (one, too hastily gathered, at the end of the Council of Carthage in May 419; the other, compiled more at leisure, and therefore more complete, which was transmitted to Rome at the end of 419). This Codex Apiarii causae is in itself a testimony to the importance that Africa, like Rome, attached to the legislative provisions of the past, and therefore in a certain sense to tradition."

Pope Boniface I (Term of Office: December 418-423) took over the appeal by Apiarius of Sicca in 418 at the death of Pope Zosimus. In 419, the Bishops of Africa sent the copies of the Nicene canons obtained from Alexandria and Constantinople to justify their position that the Nicene canons did not permit Pope Zosimus' actions.

== Judgement ==
"[O]n the council at Carthage in 425, Apiarius pleaded guilty to all the charges, putting end to the jurisdictional conundrum."

== Legacy ==
The controversy over the right of a bishop to appeal directly to the bishop of Rome outlasted Pope Boniface and was still the subject of correspondence during the term of Celestine I (Term of Office: 423-432), successor to Boniface.

== See also ==
- Papal primacy
- Papal supremacy
