= Pope Zosimus =

Head of the Catholic Church from 417 to 418

Pope Saint Zosimus
- Bishop of Rome
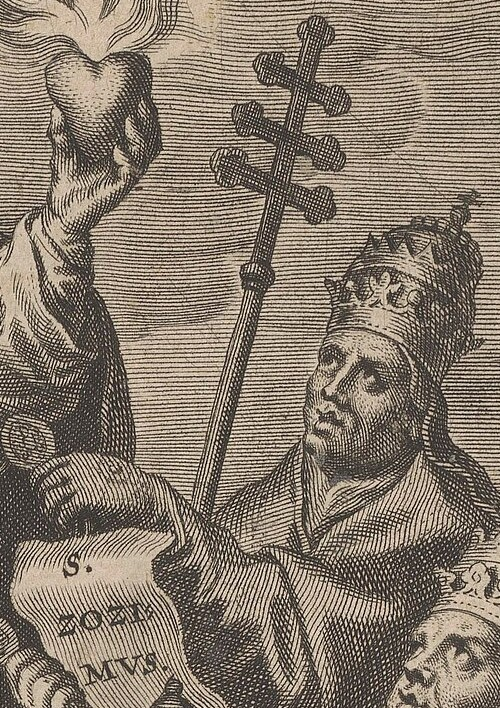
- Pope Zosimus in an engraving by Cornelis Galle the Elder, c. 1640
- Church: Catholic Church
- Papacy began: 18 March 417
- Papacy ended: 26 December 418
- Predecessor: Innocent I
- Successor: Boniface I

Personal details
- Died: 26 December 418 Rome, Western Roman Empire

Sainthood
- Feast day: 27 December

Pope Zosimus was the bishop of Rome from 18 March 417 to his death on 26 December 418. Zosimus took a decided part in the protracted dispute in Gaul as to the jurisdiction of the See of Arles over that of Vienne, giving energetic decisions in favour of the former, but without settling the controversy. His fractious temper coloured all the controversies in which he took part, in Gaul, Africa and Italy, including Rome, where at his death the clergy were very much divided.

== Family background ==
According to the Liber Pontificalis, Zosimus was a Greek and his father's name was Abramius. Historian Adolf von Harnack deduced from this that the family was of Jewish origin, but this has been rejected by Louis Duchesne.

== Pontificate ==
The consecration of Zosimus as bishop of Rome took place on 18 March 417. The festival was attended by Bishop Patroclus of Arles, who had been raised to that see in place of Bishop Heros of Arles, who had been deposed by Constantius III. Patroclus soon gained confidence with the new pope; as early as 22 March he received a papal letter which conferred upon him the rights of a metropolitan over all the bishops of the Gallic provinces of Viennensis and Narbonensis I and II. In addition, he was made a kind of papal vicar for the whole of Gaul, with no Gallic ecclesiastic being permitted to journey to Rome without bringing with him a certificate of identity from Patroclus.

In the year 400, Arles had been substituted for Trier as the residence of the chief government official of the civil Diocese of Gaul, the "Prefectus Praetorio Galliarum". Patroclus, who enjoyed the support of the commander Constantine, used this opportunity to procure for himself the position of supremacy above mentioned, by winning over Zosimus to his ideas. The bishops of Vienne, Narbonne, and Marseille regarded this elevation of the See of Arles as an infringement of their rights, and raised objections which occasioned several letters from Zosimus. The dispute, however, was not settled until the pontificate of Pope Leo I.

=== Confrontation with Pelagianism ===
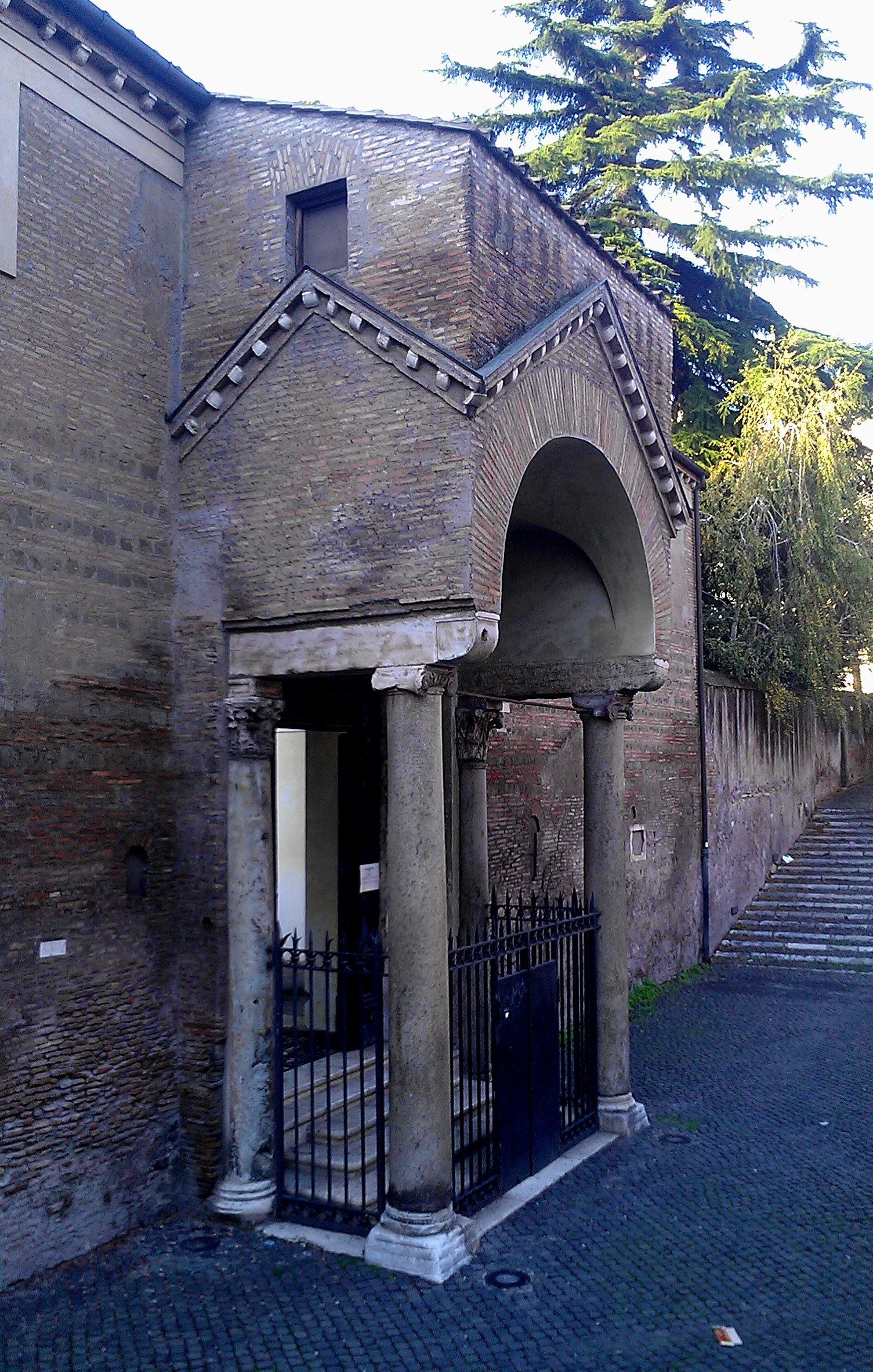
Side entrance to San Clemente al Laterano, which is largely the same as it was when Zosimus and Caelestius met there in AD 418.

Caelestius, a proponent of Pelagianism who had been condemned by the preceding pope, Innocent I, came to Rome to appeal to the new pope, having been expelled from Constantinople. In the summer of 418, Zosimus held a meeting of the Roman clergy in the Basilica of St. Clement before which Caelestius appeared. The propositions drawn up by the deacon Paulinus of Milan, on account of which Caelestius had been condemned at Carthage in 411, were laid before him. Caelestius refused to condemn these propositions, at the same time declaring in general that he accepted the doctrine expounded in the letters of Pope Innocent and making a confession of faith which was approved. The pope was won over by the conduct of Caelestius and said that it was not certain whether he had really maintained the false doctrine rejected by Innocent, and therefore Zosimus considered the action of the African bishops against Caelestius too hasty. He wrote at once in this sense to the bishops of the African province and called upon those who had anything to bring against Caelestius to appear at Rome within two months.

After he received from Pelagius a confession of faith, together with a new treatise on free will, Zosimus held a new synod of the Roman clergy, before which both these writings were read. The assembly held the statements to be orthodox, and Zosimus again wrote to the African bishops defending Pelagius and reproving his accusers, among whom were the Gallic bishops Hero and Lazarus. Archbishop Aurelius of Carthage quickly called a synod, which sent a reply to Zosimus in which it was argued that the pope had been deceived by heretics. In his answer, Zosimus declared that he had settled nothing definitely, and wished to settle nothing without consulting the African bishops. After the new synodal letter of the African council of 1 May 418 to the pope, and after the steps taken by the emperor Honorius against the Pelagians, Zosimus issued his Tractoria, in which Pelagianism and its authors were finally condemned.

Shortly after this, Zosimus became involved in a dispute with the African bishops in regard to the right of clerics who had been condemned by their bishops to appeal to the Roman See. When the priest Apiarius of Sicca had been excommunicated by his bishop on account of his crimes, he appealed directly to the pope, without regard to the regular course of appeal in Africa, which was exactly prescribed. The pope at once accepted the appeal, and sent legates with credentials to Africa to investigate the matter. Another, potentially wiser, course would have been to have first referred the case of Apiarius to the ordinary course of appeal in Africa itself. Zosimus next made the further mistake of basing his action on a reputed canon of the First Council of Nicaea, which was, in reality, a canon of the Council of Sardica. In the Roman manuscripts the canons of Sardica followed those of Nicaea immediately, without an independent title, while the African manuscripts contained only the genuine canons of Nicaea, so that the canon appealed to by Zosimus was not contained in the African copies of the Nicene canons. This mistake ignited a serious disagreement over the appeal, which continued after the death of Zosimus.

== Legacy ==
Besides the writings of the pope already mentioned, there are extant other letters to the bishops of the Byzantine province in Africa, in regard to a deposed bishop, and to the bishops of Gaul and Spain in respect to Priscillianism and ordination to the different grades of the clergy. The Liber Pontificalis attributes to Zosimus a decree on the wearing of the maniple by deacons, and on the dedication of Easter candles in the country parishes; also a decree forbidding clerics to visit taverns. Zosimus was buried in the sepulchral Basilica of Saint Lawrence outside the Walls.

== See also ==
- List of Catholic saints
- List of popes

== Sources ==
- Dalmon, L. (2009), "Le Pape Zosime et la tradition juridique romaine," Eruditio Antiqua 1 (2009) 141–154. (in French)
- Duchesne, Louis (1886). Le Liber Pontificalis (in French and Latin). Vol. Tome premier. Paris: E. Thorin. pp. 225–226.
- Fleury, Claude (1843). Newman, John Henry (ed.). The Ecclesiastical History, from A.D. 400, to A.D. 429, Translated, with Notes. Oxford: John Henry Parker. pp. 23–24, 42–55.
- Lamberigts, M. (1992), "Augustine and Julian of Aeclanum on Zosimus," Augustiniana 42 (1992) 311–330.
- Loomis, Louise Ropes (tr.), ed. (1916). The Book of the Popes (Liber Pontificalis). Vol. I. New York: Columbia University Press. pp. 88–89.
- Marcos, Mar (2013). "Papal Authority, Local Autonomy, and Imperial Control: Pope Zosimus and the Western Churches," in: Fear, Andrew; Urbiña, José Fernández; Marcos Sanchez, Mar (edd.) (2013). The Role of the Bishop in Late Antiquity: Conflict and Compromise. London: A&C Black/Bloomsbury Group. pp. 145–166. ISBN 978-1-78093-217-0.
- Palanque, J. R. (1935), "Les dissensions des églises des Gaules à la fin du IVe Siècle et la date du concile de Turin", Revue d'histoire de l'église de France 31 (1935)] 481–501. (in French)

Titles of the Great Christian Church
Preceded by Innocent I	Pope; 417–418	Succeeded by Boniface I
