= De doctrina Christiana =

Theological text by Augustine of Hippo

De doctrina Christiana (On Christian Doctrine or On Christian Teaching) is a theological text written by Augustine of Hippo. It consists of four books that describe how to interpret and teach the Scriptures. The first three of these books were published in 397 and the fourth added in 426. By writing this text, Augustine set three tasks for Christian teachers and preachers: to discover the truth in the contents of the Scriptures, to teach the truth from the Scriptures, and to defend scriptural truth when it was attacked.

== Historical context ==
Starting in AD 389, the powerful application of faith to politics led Emperor Theodosius to issue a series of edicts against paganism that concluded in 391 with a law making pagan worship illegal. During the Golden Age of Athens, politics and man-made laws guided human conduct, and the city-state was viewed as a manifestation of the highest human values, giving rise to political philosophy. Christianity effected a change in the course of Western society, requiring a new cultural identity and a new educational curriculum. With this aim in mind, Emperor Justinian (AD 483–565) cut off all state funding to chairs of rhetoric, essentially bringing the pagan classical tradition to a close. The classical heritage was from this time onward viewed through the lens of Christianity, increasing the need for an approach to the teaching of scripture that matched the sophistication of the classical inheritance. De doctrina Christiana supplied the medieval world with that tool.

== Summary ==
=== Prologue ===
The Prologue consists of a response to those who would resist Augustine's project of providing rules for interpretation of the Scriptures. Augustine outlines three possible objections, including those who do not understand his precepts, those who fail to make effective use of his teachings, and those who believe they are already prepared to interpret the Scriptures. To the first two types of critics, Augustine states that he cannot be held responsible for their inability to understand.

He then addresses the third type of critic, those who believe they are already able to interpret the Scriptures. If their claims are true, he acknowledges that they have received a great blessing. However, they must admit that language itself was learned from a human being, not directly from God. Therefore, God has created human beings to learn from one another, and we ought to learn with humility. All good teaching from human beings derives ultimately from God. The ability to understand obscurity is therefore both the gift of God and reinforced by human teaching.

=== Book One ===
Book One discusses enjoyment, use, interpretation, and the relation of various Christian doctrines to these concepts. Augustine begins with a discussion of the steps in the interpretive process: discovery of what is to be understood, and a way of teaching what has been discovered.

He then expands upon the Platonic notion that there are things and signs. Signs are used to symbolize things, but are considered things themselves because they too represent meaning. They are given meaning through their repetition and propagation throughout society.

Some things are to be enjoyed (in Latin, frui), and others are to be used (uti). Things we enjoy are those we find good in themselves, and things we use are those that are good for the sake of something else. The only thing that is to be enjoyed is God. All other things, including other human beings, are to be used in relation to the proper end of enjoyment. To use something which is to be enjoyed or vice versa is to fail to love properly. The discussion of enjoyment and use leads to an extended reflection on motivation, word as flesh, and humanity as image of God.

Book One concludes with a discussion of love: how humans ought to love God, how God's love is expressed in his use of humanity, and how people may appreciate God's love through the Scriptures, faith, and charity. Augustine also claims that those who think they understand the Scriptures, but do not interpret them to reflect charity and love, do not really understand them.

=== Book Two ===
Book Two discusses the types of unknown signs present in the world and defines each and presents methods for understanding the Scriptures. Obscure signs include unknown literal signs and unknown figurative signs. Unknown signs are those that have meanings that are unknown. Augustine says that a feature of the Scriptures is obscurity and that obscurity is the result of sin: that is, God made the Scriptures obscure in order to motivate and challenge our fallen minds.

Augustine claims there are seven steps to wisdom in interpretation of the Scriptures: fear of God, holiness and faith, scientia (or knowledge), strength, good counsel, purity of heart, and then wisdom. He also distinguishes "truth" from "logic", and argues that logic can lead to falsehood. He declares that it is better to have truth than logic.

Augustine argues that committing the Scriptures to memory is critical to understanding. Once the reader is "familiar with the language of Scripture", it is possible for him to try to untangle sections that are obscure. He also emphasizes studying the Scriptures in their original languages to avoid the problems of imperfect and divergent translations. Throughout Book Two, Augustine stresses the importance of method as well as virtue for attaining wisdom through the Scriptures. He analyzes sources of knowledge, reason, and eloquence as well as charity and humility.

In chapter 8, Augustine discusses the canon of the Bible. In determining which books to include, he writes: "Now in regard to the canonical Scriptures, [an interpreter] must follow the judgment of the greater number of Catholic Churches; and among these, of course a high place must be given to such as have been thought worthy to be the seat of an apostle and to receive epistles." For the Old Testament, he lists 44 books. For the New Testament, he lists the 27 books of the contemporary canon. He writes that there are "fourteen epistles of the Apostle Paul", including the epistle to the Hebrews. Augustine's list is the same as the Canon approved by the third Synod of Carthage (AD 397), and it is possible that he might have played a role in the synod's decision on the canon.

=== Book Three ===
Book Three discusses how to interpret ambiguous literal and ambiguous figurative signs. Ambiguous signs are those whose meaning is unclear or confused. He suggests first determining things from signs. Then, once the distinction is made, understand the literal meaning of the text (things as things, nothing more). Determining if there is a deeper meaning in the text can be done by recognizing a different, more figurative, mode of writing. This may show that the things are also signs of something else. For example, an aged tree could be a literal tree or it could be a symbol of long life (as a sign or allegory).

Augustine emphasizes right motives when interpreting scripture, and claims that it is more important to build up love than to arrive at a historically or literally accurate interpretation. He also stresses that contemporary readers must be careful to understand that some actions (i.e., having multiple wives) which were acceptable among the ancients are no longer acceptable, and must therefore be interpreted figuratively. Understanding tropes such as irony and antiphrasis will also be beneficial for interpretation.

The final section of Book Three is one of Augustine's late additions to the work (with Book Four), consisting of Tyconius's seven rules for interpreting scripture: The Lord and His Body, The Twofold Division of the Body of the Lord, The Promises and the Law (or The Spirit and the Letter), Species and Genus, Times, Recapitulation, and The Devil and His Body.

=== Book Four ===
Book Four discusses the relationship between Christian truth and rhetoric, the importance of eloquence, and the role of the preacher. This book was appended to the work a number of years after its original composition, along with the end of Book Three. Augustine again stresses the importance of both discovery and teaching for the interpretation of Scripture. He cautions the reader that he will not discuss the rules of rhetoric here; for though they are acceptable and useful for the Christian speaker, they can easily be learned elsewhere. Though eloquence is a skill which can be used for good or evil, it should be used in service to wisdom. It is not necessary, then, for the preacher to be eloquent, but only wise. Nonetheless, eloquence can enhance one's ability to teach wisdom. The proper goal of rhetoric should thus be to teach wisdom by the use of eloquence.

Augustine then analyzes the relationship between eloquence and teaching, including various stylistic points, a discussion of inspiration, and the claim that eloquence and teaching are both to be valued. Drawing on Cicero, Augustine outlines three types of style—subdued style, moderate style, and grand style—and discusses the proper context for each. The use of these styles must be determined by subject matter as well as the audience.

Finally, Augustine concludes by considering the importance of the preacher's life, which is more important than eloquence for persuading the audience. In this regard, things (the preacher's actions) are more important than signs (the preacher's words). Prayer is essential in order to receive from God the wisdom which will be passed on to the audience. The text concludes with an injunction to humility and thanks to God that Augustine has been able to discuss these topics.

== Connections to Augustine, Cicero, and classical rhetoric in Book Four ==
Book Four of De doctrina Christiana has sparked a great deal of debate among scholars with regard to the extent to which Augustine's work has been influenced by the rules and traditions of classical rhetoric, and more specifically by the writings of Cicero. In the final chapter of On Christian Doctrine, Augustine uses much of Cicero's rhetorical theory as he lays down the foundation for the proper use of rhetoric by Christian teachers. For example, Augustine quotes Cicero (Orat. 21. 69.) when he writes, "a certain eloquent man said, and said truly, that he who is eloquent should speak in such a way that he teaches, delights, and moves."

Some scholars claim that Book Four of this text has been greatly influenced by both Ciceronian and classical rhetoric. In his introduction to one edition of On Christian Doctrine, D.W. Robertson Jr. states that "the allegorical interpretation of literature itself was a classical practice." At the same time, others have argued that St. Augustine is instead, "writing against the tradition of classical rhetoric." One academic, Stanley Fish, has even gone so far as to claim that "Augustine effectively declares the speaker irrelevant as well when he tells would-be preachers to pray for God to put good speeches in their mouths (38).

In recent years, a number of scholars have made a concerted effort to achieve some degree of compromise or middle ground within this heated debate. Celica Milovanovic-Barham wrote an article in which she acknowledged this contention, and attempted to argue several places in the text where Augustine agrees or disagrees with Cicero's rhetorical theories. The article analyzes Augustine's use of ciceronian rhetoric through his discussion of Cicero's three levels of style: plain, middle, and grand. Although Augustine begins Book Four by asserting that wisdom and clarity are far more important in the rhetoric of a Christian teacher, he also acknowledges the power of style and eloquence in connecting with an audience and in persuading the people to act according to Christian law and teachings. According to Barham, this is where Augustine "quotes Cicero's very words: 'he, then, shall be eloquent, who can say little things in a subdued style, moderate things in a temperate style, and great things in a majestic style.'" However, Barham is also quick to note that, "Augustine, after all, does not completely agree with his famous predecessor", in that, he believes that for Christian teachers, nothing they preach would be considered a 'little thing'. As a result, Barham argues that Augustine is advocating for alternating and blending the various 'styles' of rhetoric all within a single speech. She explains that by combining these three different styles, Augustine believes the speaker is able to produce a more powerful speech by delivering the necessary information in a clear and accurate way, while he is also able to connect with the audience's emotions through the more grand and passionate style.

John D. Schaeffer claims that Augustine's writings should not be analyzed at all from the same perspective as the classical rhetoricians, because his works were produced in an entirely different era and for an entirely different group of people than those of the great classical rhetoricians. The issue for Schaeffer lies in the fact that Augustine was trying to bring together the elements of orality and the Christian religion, which was founded primarily upon the written scriptures and called for private introspection and prayer. Schaeffer says, "book 4 attempts to resolve a central paradox of early Christianity by synthesizing the oral world of public performance with a religion grounded in writing and addressed to the inner person...De doctrina presents Augustine's attempt to bring classical rhetoric...to bear on Christian preaching." Therefore, he argues that Augustine was not simply writing against the traditions of classical rhetoric and that scholars should consider Augustine's work within its own context.

== Bibliography ==
- Augustine (1995). De doctrina Christiana. Oxford early Christian texts. R.P.H. Green (ed. and trans.). Oxford: Clarendon Press. ISBN 0198263341.
- On the Christian Doctrine, transl. by J. F. Shaw, in: St. Augustine: City of God and Christian Doctrine (Kindle Edition), Select Library of Nicene and Post-Nicene Fathers of The Christian Church, Edinburgh: T&T Clark.
- Woo, B. Hoon (2013). "Augustine's Hermeneutics and Homiletics in De doctrina Christiana". Journal of Christian Philosophy. 17: 97–117.
