= Agrippinus of Carthage =

Bishop of Carthage around the 230s

Saint Agrippinus
- Bishop of Carthage
- Diocese: Carthage

Agrippinus was one of the earliest known bishops of Carthage around the 230s. During his episcopacy, he dealt with the issue of how to treat Christian converts from schism or heresy. According to St. Vincent of Lérins, Agrippinius held that "Baptism ought to be repeated" , which St. Vincent said that such a doctrine was "contrary to the divine canon, contrary to the rule of the universal church, contrary to the customs and institutions of our ancestors." He called a synod of bishops of Numidia and Africa, probably around 230–235, which decided that such converts should be fully baptized.

Subsequently, St. Cyprian would mention the positive reputation of Agrippinus (bonæ memoriæ vir).

St. Augustine, in his arguments against the Donatists, would remark that Agrippinus and Cyprian maintained the unity of the church despite being doctrinally mistaken.
