= Ticonius =

Theologian of 4th-century North African Latin Christianity

Ticonius, also spelled Tyconius or Tychonius (active 370–390 AD), was a major theologian of 4th-century North African Latin Christianity. He was a Donatist writer whose conception of the City of God influenced St. Augustine of Hippo (who wrote a book on the same topic).

== Life and doctrine ==
Ticonius subscribed to a milder form of Donatism than Parmenianus, admitting a church outside his own sect and rejecting the rebaptism of Catholics. Parmenianus wrote a letter against him, quoted by Augustine.

He also defended the Nicene doctrine of the homoousios, stating:

"[In the image of the Son] sitting with [the Father], he shows that the Son participates in the power of the Father. For what else does it mean that he is seated on the throne of the Father than that he is of one and the same substance? For God the Son is powerful, who in the Father is everywhere and by his own power fills the heaven and the earth."

— Commentary on the Apocalypse 3.21

The main source on Ticonius is Gennadius:

"Tichonius an African was learned in theology, sufficiently instructed in history, not ignorant of secular knowledge. He wrote books, De bello intestino and Expositiones diversarum causarum [these are both Donatist apologies]: in which, to defend his side, he quotes ancient synods; from which he is seen to have been of the Donatist party. He composed eight [should be seven] rules for discovering the meaning of the Scriptures, which he arranged in one book. He also explained the whole Apocalypse of John, understanding all of it in a spiritual sense, nothing carnally. In this exposition he said that the body [of man] is the dwelling-place of an angel. He denied the idea of a kingdom of the righteous on earth lasting a thousand years after the resurrection. Nor did he admit two future resurrections of the dead in the flesh, one of the good and one of the bad, but only one of all, in which the misbegotten and deformed will rise too, so that no part of the human race ever animated by a soul shall perish. He showed the distinction of the resurrection really to be that we must believe that there is a revelation of the righteous now in this world, when those justified by faith rise by baptism from the death of sin to the reward of the eternal life, and the second [resurrection] to be the general one of all flesh. He flourished at the same time as Tyrannius Rufinus; in the reign of Theodosius I and his son".

This gives 379–423 AD as extreme dates of his life.

== Works ==
Ticonius's best known work was his commentary on the Revelation, which, like Origen, he interpreted almost entirely in a spiritual sense. He asserted that the book depicts the spiritual controversy over the kingdom of God. This work is lost, but some essential parts survive as quotes in Augustine, Primasius, Bede, and Beatus of Liébana's Commentary on the Apocalypse.

To outline his general conceptions, he laid down his Seven Rules, quoted and explained by Augustine in De doctrina christiana. Augustine's authority gave them great importance for nearly a thousand years in the West.

1. "De domino et corpore ejus, that is, about the Lord and His body, or church.
2. "De domini corpore bipartitio, or "on the twofold body of the Lord."
3. "De promissis et lege, "on the promises and the law."
4. "De specie et genere, "concerning species and genus"; that is, it is permissible to take a species of the text, and to understand thereby the genus to which it belongs——to reach the abstract thought from the concrete picture. (This led to fanciful, symbolic or mystical interpretations.)
5. "De temporibus, or "concerning times," which reveal the mystic measure of time in the Bible——a part of time standing for the whole, as in the three days between the death and the resurrection of Christ—or the mystical value of numbers, especially 7, 10, and 12.
6. "De recapitulatione, "on recapitulation," which states that in the book of Revelation the narrative is not continuous, but repeats itself and goes over the same ground under new and different symbols.
7. "De diabolo et ejus corpore, "on Satan and his body," an exact analogy to Christ and His body. As Christ is represented in His church, the elect, or righteous, so Satan is represented in the corpus malorum, the evildoers, or the body of the rejected."

— Froom, The Prophetic Faith of Our Fathers, Volume 1, page 467.
