= Parmenian =

Parmenian (Latin: Parmenianus; died ca. 392) was a North African Donatist bishop, the successor of Donatus in the Donatist bishopric of Carthage. He wrote several works defending the rigorist views of the Donatists and is recognized as "the most famous Donatist writer of his day", but none of his writings have survived.

== Life ==
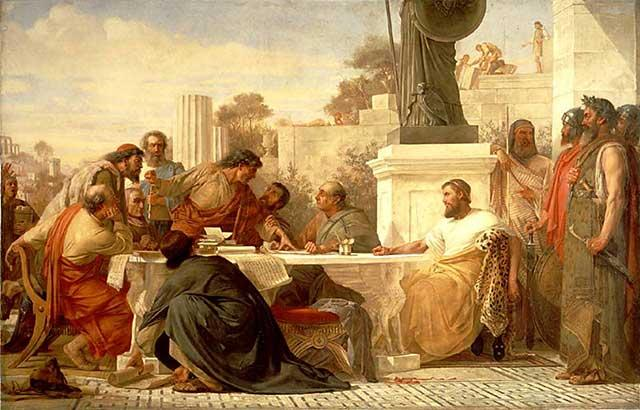
Julian the Apostate presiding at a conference of sectarians (Edward Armitage, 1875). Julian's decree of 362 allowed Parmenian to return to Carthage.

Optatus of Milevis, the anti-Donatist polemicist and contemporary of Parmenian, calls him peregrinus, meaning that he was probably not a native of Africa. He may have come from Spain or Gaul.

Whatever his origin, Parmenian succeeded Donatus as Donatist bishop of Carthage around the year 350. He was banished from the city in 358. He returned in 362 under the decree of Julian that allowed exiled bishops to return to their sees. (Note: The motivation behind Julian's decree was considered, even by his contemporaries, to have been an attempt to undermine the unity of the Christian Church: "He did this the more resolutely because, as long licence increased their dissensions, he thought he should never have to fear the unanimity of the common people, having found by experience that no wild beasts are so hostile to men as Christian sects in general are to one another" (Ammianus Marcellinus, Roman History XXII, 5, 4.) Also see Augustine, Retract. ii. 17; Eusebius, Chron., quoted in Jerome, Opp. vol. iii. p. 687.) About this time, if not earlier, he published a work in five parts defending Donatism (Adversus ecclesiam traditorum), to which the treatise of Optatus is a reply. In about 372, he wrote a book against Ticonius. At an unknown year during his episcopacy, he oversaw a council of Donatist bishops that made an important proclamation about the rebaptism of traditores.

Parmenian died and was succeeded by Primian in about the year 392.

== Theology and later influence ==
Parmenian's most influential work was written in about 362 and entitled Adversus ecclesiam traditorum ("Against the church of the traditores"). While it has been lost, it appears to have been widely read by his contemporary Catholic opponents. Optatus published his great work De schismate Donatistarum ("On the schism of the Donatists") in response to Parmenian. Judging by Optatus' response, we can infer that Parmenian held the standard rigorist position of the Donatists that "the sacrifice of a sinner is polluted," and that baptism cannot be validly conferred by a sinner, such as one of the traditores. Even while arguing against his views, however, Optatus does not refer to Parmenian as a heretic, but rather as a "brother." (It was Optatus' opinion that only pagans and heretics go to hell; he believed that schismatics and all Catholics will eventually be saved after a necessary purgatory.)

In about 372, Ticonius, a lay exegete, wrote a book to condemn the more extreme views of Parmenian, but without abandoning his allegiance to the Donatist party. Parmenian replied, condemning the doctrine of Ticonius as tending to connect the true church (that of the Donatists), with the corrupt one, the Catholic church, especially its African branch.

Even if Parmenian proved more extreme than Ticonius, he can be considered a relatively moderate Donatist for the reason that he did not require the rebaptism of all converts, but only those who had received their first baptism as Catholics. This moderate rigorism is further seen in the decision of the council of 270 Donatist bishops that was convened at Carthage during the episcopate of Parmenian. After 75 days of deliberation, the council at last resolved that the traditores, even if they refused rebaptism, should be admitted to communion. (Note: See Augustine, Ep. 93, 43.)

Parmenian's book against Ticonius fell into the hands of Augustine, who, at the request of his friends, argued against its views in a treatise in three books (contra Parmenianum), over the years 402 to 405. (Note: See Tillem. xiii. 128 and note 32. For a full account of the treatise, with a list of Scripture quotations, see Ribbek, Donatus und Augustinus, pp. 348–366. (See also Augustine, Retract. ii. 17.))

A distinctive hallmark of Parmenian's theology is his idea that the true church (i.e., the Donatist church) possesses seven dotes (divine gifts), which provide proof of its purity and holiness. These were presented in the form of allegorical symbols, derived from the Song of Songs: the cathedra ("chair," representing authority); the angelus ("angel," representing validly consecrated bishop); the spiritus (the Holy Spirit); the fountain (that is, of true baptism); the seal of the fountain (which precludes communion with any other church); and the umbilicus (the "navel," that is the focal point, a properly consecrated altar for sacrifice). These "gifts" or signs of the true church were both a guarantee of its validity and protection against the individual sinfulness of some of its members.

James Alexander considers this imagery a development of the theologies of Tertullian and Cyprian, of which Parmenian "emerges as the conserver... [and] Optatus, by contrast, as the innovator."

== Evaluation ==
W. H. C. Frend argues that Parmenian was a capable and formidable bishop of his see, even if his influence and reputation eventually ceased to be recognized with the end of the Donatist schism. Frend writes that Parmenian's authority was "never seriously challenged" during his long term as bishop. After returning to Carthage in 362, he had secured unequivocal leadership of the Donatist church by 364, and held onto it until his death in 391 or 392. "He brought Donatism successfully through the crisis of Firmus' revolt, the excommunication of Tyconius [sic], and the Rogatist schism. By the end of his rule, Parmenian's church had attained the height of its power and prosperity."

A less positive evaluation of Parmenian's tenure as bishop would blame him for eventually causing the schism of Maximian within the Donatist church. The break, which occurred after Parmenian's death, split the community into groups of "Parmenianites" and "Maximianites," which "fought tooth and claw and persecuted each other." According to George M. Ella, the resulting lack of unity in the North African Christian community was a contributing factor to the ease with which the Islamic conquest of the area succeeded in the late 600s: "the blood of the Donatists had become the seed of Islam."

== Notes and references ==
Notes

Religious titles
Preceded by Donatus Magnus	Donatist Bishop of Carthage ca. 350–391 or 392	Succeeded by Primian
