= Eugenius of Carthage =

Tunisian saint and bishop (died 505)

Saint Eugenius of Carthage
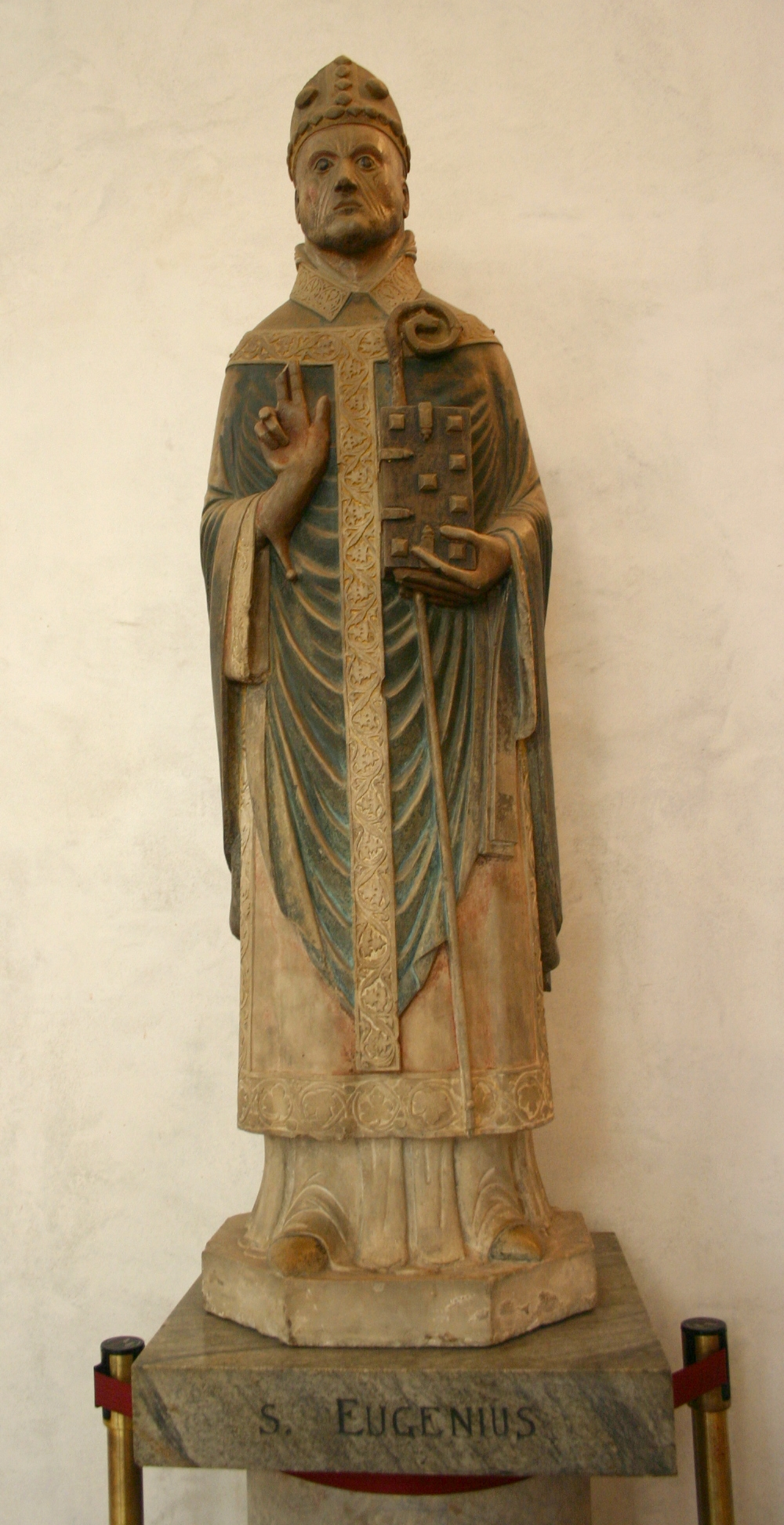
- A statue portraying Saint Eugenius, in the church museum in Sant'Eustorgio (Milan, Italy).

Bishop
- Died: July 13, 505; Vienne
- Feast: July 13

Eugenius of Carthage was a Christian prelate unanimously elected Bishop of Carthage in 480 to succeed Deogratias. He was caught up in the disputes of his day between Arianism and mainstream Christianity. He is revered as a saint.

== Biography ==
His episcopal election was deferred owing to the opposition of the Arian Vandal kings and was only permitted by King Huneric at the instance of Zeno and Placidia, into whose family the Vandals had married.

The bishop's governance, charity, austere lifestyle and courage are said to have won him the admiration of the Arians. He had admitted Vandals into the Catholic Church, contrary to royal edict, and had engaged in argument against Arian theologians, whom the king pitted against the Catholics. Both sides claimed the name "Catholic", the Arians calling their opponents "Homoousians".

The conference, held some time between 481 and February 484, ended by the withdrawal of the chief Arian bishop on the plea that he could not speak Latin. The Arians being enraged, Huneric exiled forty-six bishops to Corsica and three hundred and two to the African deserts. Among the latter was Eugenius, who under the custody of a man named Antonius dwelt in the desert of Tripoli. On setting out he wrote a letter of consolation and exhortation to the faithful of Carthage which is still extant in the works of St. Gregory of Tours (P.L., LVII, 769–71). In his uncompromising defence of the Divinity of the word of the Bible he was imitated by his flock, many of whom were exiled with him.

Gunthamund, who succeeded Huneric as Vandal king, allowed Eugenius to return to Carthage and permitted him to reopen the churches. After eight years of peace Thrasamund succeeded to the throne, arrested Eugenius and condemned him to death, but commuted the sentence into exile at Vienne, near Albi (Languedoc), where the Arian Alaric was king. Eugenius built there a monastery over the tomb of St. Amaranthus the martyr, and led a penitential life till his death on 13 July, 505.

== Legend ==
The legend associated with him is that sometime before February 1, Felix a blind man of Carthage had a dream that Bishop Eugenius would pray for him and he would be healed. Twice the man ignored the dream, but he had it again. On the third time he roused himself and sought out the Bishop. The legend continues that Felix went to the Bishop and told his story. The Bishop protested his ability to heal but eventually acquiesced with the words "I have already told you I am a sinful man; but may he who has deigned to visit you act in accordance with your faith and open you eyes". The tale continues that when he prayed for Felix his sight was restored. When news of the miracle reached the Vandal king, Huneric is said to have unsuccessfully tried to kill Felix.

== Legacy ==
He wrote an Expositio Fidei Catholicae, demanded of him by Huneric, probably the one submitted by the Catholic bishops at the conference. It argues the Consubstantiality of the Bible and the divinity of the Holy Spirit. He wrote also an Apologeticus pro Fide; Altercatio cum Arianis, fragments of which are quoted by Victor de Vita; also pleas for the Catholics, addressed to Huneric or his successors.

Both Gennadius of Massilia and Pope Gelasius I had heard of the subject by 494 and two pastoral letters survive.

In 992 the bishop of Savona established a monastery on Bergeggi island dedicated to St. Eugenius.

== See also ==
- Athanasius of Alexandria

== Sources ==
- Herbermann, Charles, ed. (1913). "Eugenius of Carthage". Catholic Encyclopedia. New York: Robert Appleton Company.
