= Maximian (bishop of Carthage) =

Maximian was a 4th-century Bishop of Carthage and founder of a splinter group that left Donatism.

== Biography ==
Maximian was a relative of Donatus of Casae Nigrae and was one of several people excommunicated in 391 by Primian, Bishop of Carthage. Primian was a great orator and thinker, but tactless and within a year had alienated large parts of the church. In 393 AD a council of more than 100 Donatist bishops elected Maximian to replace Primian as Bishop of Carthages. Primian held a rival council in Bagai in April 394AD and excommunicated Maximian. Primian, a former lawyer, also used the civil courts to reclaim church buildings.

The schism that enveloped around Maximian was the largest splintering within the Donatist movement. He took a less confrontational approach, and sought to reform the movement. However, it attracted limited adherents.

The Donatists sought to depose Salvius, the Maximianist Bishop of Membresa, in favour of the Primianist Restitutus. Much respected by the residents of Membresa, his people built him a new church, and three bishops coexisted in this small town, a Maximianist, a Primianist, and a Catholic.

Maximian was often referenced by Augustine in his critique of the Donatists.
