= Aurelius of Carthage =

Bishop of Carthage, c. 391-429

Saint Aurelius

Deacon, Archbishop of Carthage
- Died: 20 July 429 AD
- Venerated in: Roman Catholic Church; Eastern Orthodox Church
- Feast: July 20

Aurelius of Carthage was a Christian saint who died around 430. A friend of Augustine of Hippo, he was bishop of Carthage from about 391 until his death.

== Life ==
Not much is known about his life outside of his ecclesiastical activities. At the time when Augustine of Hippo returned to Africa in 388, Aurelius was a deacon. Aurelius served as a patron to Augustine when Augustine was at Hippo. Augustine sought the establishment of a monastic community - for which space was granted by bishop Valerius - and was funded by Aurelius. Aurelius provided the monastery with new members for the purpose of episcopal training, effectively turning the monastery into a sort of early episcopal seminary. Augustine admired Aurelius, and a number of letters from Augustine to Aurelius have survived.

Aurelius became Bishop of Carthage around 392 and led a number of ecclesiastical councils on Christian doctrine and clerical discipline, including the important Council of 419 which codified "The Code of Canons of the African Church". Aurelius was one of the first Bishops to denounce Pelagianism. He encouraged veneration of the martyrs, and introduced the feast day of Saint Cyprian.

Aurelius's feast day in the Roman Catholic Church is July 20.
