= Augustiniana =

- Discipline: Philosophy, theology, history
- Language: English, French, German, Spanish, Italian
- Edited by: Anthony Dupont

Publication details
- History: 1951–present
- Publisher: Augustinian Historical Institute

Standard abbreviations
- ISO 4: Augustiniana

Indexing
- ISSN: 0004-8003 (print); 2295-6093 (web)
- JSTOR: augustiniana

Links
- Journal homepage

Augustiniana is a peer-reviewed academic journal of Augustinian Historical Institute (Belgium) devoted to the study of Augustine of Hippo, the Augustinian Order, Augustinianism and Jansenism.

The editor in chief is Anthony Dupont and the review editor is Marie Pauliat.

== See also ==
- Augustinus-Lexikon
- Augustinian Studies
