= Paul Monceaux =

French historian and professor (1859–1941)

- Born: Étienne-Paul-Victor Monceaux; 29 May 1859; Auxerre, Yonne, France
- Died: 7 February 1941 (aged 81); Sceaux, Seine, occupied France
- Occupation: Historian

Étienne-Paul-Victor Monceaux (French pronunciation: [pɔl mɔ̃so]; 29 May 1859 – 7 February 1941) was a 19th–20th-century French historian. A professor at the Collège de France from 1907 to 1937, he was elected a member of the Académie des Inscriptions et Belles-Lettres in 1912. His major speciality was Christian Latinity in the Roman provinces of North Africa.

== Selected publications ==
- 1883: Apulée, roman et magie, Paris, Quantin,
- 1886: Les proxénies grecques, P., Thorin, VIII+331pp
- 1889: La restauration d'Olympie; l'histoire, les monuments, le culte et les fêtes (in collab. with Victor Laloux), P., Quantin
- 1892: La Grèce avant Alexandre. Étude sur la société grecque du VIe au IVe siècle, P., Quantin
- 1894: Les Africains. Etude sur la littérature latine d'Afrique : les Païens, P., Lecène, Oudin & Cie, V+500pp
- 1901–1923: Histoire littéraire de l'Afrique chrétienne depuis les origines jusqu'à l'invasion arabe (7 volumes : Tertullien et les origines - saint Cyprien et son temps - le IV, d'Arnobe à Victorin - le Donatisme - saint Optat et les premiers écrivains donatistes - la littérature donatiste au temps de saint Augustin - saint Augustin et le donatisme), P., Leroux.
- 1909: Racine

== Sources ==
- Pierre Courcelle, Paul Monceaux (1859-1941), 1941
