= Zaire Use =

Liturgical use of the Roman Rite in Subsaharan Africa

The Zaire Use, also called Zairean Rite (French: rite zaïrois), officially the Roman Missal for the Dioceses of Zaire (French: missel romain pour les diocèses du Zaïre), is a Congolese liturgical use of the Roman Rite within the Catholic Church. Approved by the Vatican in 1988, it contains many elements from the Ordinary Form of the Roman Rite, but also incorporates elements from sub-Saharan African culture, particularly Congolese, including a number of inculturated liturgical modifications.

== History ==
The Zaire Use is largely a product of the Second Vatican Council's constitution Sacrosanctum Concilium, particularly the move "for legitimate variations and adaptations to different groups, regions, and peoples, especially in mission lands, provided that the substantial unity of the Roman rite is preserved."

It follows the 1956 Masses of the Savanes in Upper Volta and of the Piroguieres and the 1958 Missa Luba in Zaire. Following the 1970 authorization from the Congregation for Divine Worship and the Discipline of the Sacraments and the 1973 draft presentation of a new Order of the Mass from the Commission on Evangelization, the Episcopal Conference in Zaire (the name of the Democratic Republic of the Congo from 1971 to 1997) approved its use experimentally. As the "Zairean Rite", it was adopted formally in 1985.

It was officially promulgated by the decree Zairensium Dioecesium on April 30, 1988 by the Congregation for Divine Worship, as the Missel romain pour les diocèses du Zaïre (Roman Missal for the Dioceses of Zaire). The missal containing the rubrics and text of the Zaire Use is entitled Congolese Missal for the Dioceses of Zaire.

On 1 December 2019, Pope Francis celebrated Mass for the first Sunday of Advent in Saint Peter's Basilica using this rite to mark the 25th anniversary of the establishment of the first chaplaincy for the Congolese Catholic community in Rome. A year later, on 1 December 2020, Vatican News released a video statement in which Pope Francis announced that a book regarding the 1 December 2019 Mass authored by Sister Rita Mboshu Kongo would be released. Sister Rita had spoken at the conclusion of the 2019 Mass.

== Differences from the Ordinary Form ==
=== Liturgical calendar ===
Under pressure from Zairean President Mobutu Sese Seko to remove Western influences as part of broader cultural reforms, a 1975 synod of the Congolese Episcopal Conference chose not to celebrate various feast days venerating saints when they fall within the week, moving their celebration to the nearest Sunday. This choice was approved by the Holy See. Similar pressures from the Mobutu government inspired a revision of the practice of baptismal names, with some families selecting traditionally native African names for common use and baptismal names such as "Grâce à Dieu" and "Gloire à Dieu."

=== Adjustment of the liturgy ===
Distinct from the Ordinary Form, the congregation stands during the consecration of the Eucharist, rather than kneeling as is done in many regions using the Ordinary Form of the Roman Rite. (Note: Per Paragraph 43 2010 Roman Missal: "The faithful should stand from the beginning of the Entrance chant, or while the priest approaches the altar, until the end of the collect; for the Alleluia chant before the Gospel; while the Gospel itself is proclaimed; during the Profession of Faith and the Prayer of the Faithful; from the invitation, Orate, fratres (Pray, brethren), before the prayer over the offerings until the end of Mass...") There is also an "invocation of the Ancestors of upright heart" ("invocation ancêtres au cœur droit") in addition to the invocation of the saints. The intention of the former is the veneration of only "ancestors" "who have lived in an exemplary way."

The Penitential Act is instead performed after the homily and if done, recitation of the Creed. One stated intention for this placement is that only after listening to scripture would the congregation be able to seek forgiveness. The Sign of Peace immediately follows the Penitential Act, predicated on the Gospels calling for the need for reconciliation with one's neighbor before offering one's gift at the altar (i.e., the Liturgy of the Eucharist; see Matthew 5:24). In other forms of the Roman Rite, the sign occurs within the Communion rite.

Additionally, priests offering the Mass in the Zaire Use are to dress in traditionally African priestly vestments.

=== Participation of the laity ===
The Zaire Use was created with intention to better incorporate the congregation into the celebration of the Mass. To do this, responses were added, including one at the conclusion of the homily and Eucharistic prayer. Additionally, the congregation is explicitly welcomed to raise their hands during the Lord's Prayer, a practice variously allowed or prohibited by episcopal conferences utilizing the Ordinary Form.

Due to awareness of culturally normative displays of respect and attentiveness in the Congo, the congregation sits for the reading of the Gospel. An announcer also calls the congregation to attention at specific points in the liturgy. Dancing among the congregants is permitted.

== See also ==
- African Rite
- Catholic Church in the Democratic Republic of the Congo
- Latin liturgical rites
- Missa Luba
