= Councils of Carthage =

3rd–5th century church synods held in Africa

The Councils of Carthage were church synods held during the 3rd, 4th, and 5th centuries in the city of Carthage in Africa. The most important of these are described below.

== Synod of 251 ==
In May 251 a synod, assembled under the presidency of Cyprian to consider the treatment of the Lapsi, excommunicated Felicissimus and five other Novatian bishops (Rigorists), and declared that the lapsi should be dealt with, not with indiscriminate severity, but according to the degree of individual guilt. These decisions were confirmed by a synod of Rome in the autumn of the same year. Other Carthaginian synods concerning the lapsi were held in 252 and 254.

== Synod of 256 ==
Two synods, in 255 and 256, held under Cyprian, pronounced against the validity of heretical baptism, thus taking direct issue with Stephen I, bishop of Rome, who promptly repudiated them. A third synod in September 256, possibly following the repudiation, unanimously reaffirmed the position of the other two. Stephen's claims to authority as bishop of bishops were sharply resented, and for some time the relations of the Roman and African sees were severely strained.

- A variety of unresolved issues related to restoration of the lapsed in faith and the actions of those who had been considered heretics remained to be dealt with at the first ecumenical council. The eighth canon of the council in particular addressed Novationists.

== Synod of 345 ==
Around 345–348 under Gratus a synod of orthodox bishops, who had met to record their gratitude for the effective official repression of the Circumcelliones (Donatists), declared against the rebaptism of any one who had been baptized in the name of the Trinity, and adopted twelve canons of clerical discipline.

== Synod of 397 ==
The Council of Carthage, called the third by Denzinger, met on 28 August 397. It reaffirmed the canons of Hippo from 393, and issued its own. It was attended by Augustine of Hippo.

One of these gives a canon of the Bible. The primary source of information about the third Council of Carthage comes from the Codex Canonum Ecclesiae Africanae, which presents a compilation of ordinances enacted by various church councils in Carthage during the fourth and fifth centuries. In one section of this code the following paragraph concerning the canon of Scripture appears.

16 [Placuit] ut praeter Scripturas canonicas nihil in Ecclesia legatur sub nomine divinarum Scripturarum. Sunt autem canonicae Scripture: Genesis, Exodus, Leviticus, Numeri, Deuterenomium, Iesu Nave, Iudicum, Ruth, Regnorum libri quatour, Paralipomenon libri duo, Iob, Psalterium Davidicum, Salomonis libre quinque, Duodecim libri prophetarum, Esaias, Ieremias, Daniel, Ezechiel, Tobias, Iudith, Hester, Hesdrae libre duo, Machabaeorum libre duo.

17 Novi autem Testamenti, evangeliorum libri quatuor, Actus Apostolorum liber unus, Pauli Apostoli epistolae tredecim., eiusdem ad Hebraeos una, Petri duae, Iohannis tres, Iacobi una, Iudae una, Apocalipsis Ioannis.

18 Ita ut de confirmando isto canone trasmarina Ecclesia consultatur. Liceat etiam legi passiones Martyrum, cum anniversarii dies eorum celebrantur

20 Hoc etiam fratri et consacerdoti nostro Bonifacio, vel aliis earum partium episcopis, pro confirmando isto canone innotescas, quia ita a patribus ista accepimus in ecclesia legenda.

16 It was also determined that besides the Canonical Scriptures nothing be read in the Church under the title of divine Scriptures. The Canonical Scriptures are these: Genesis, Exodus, Leviticus, Numbers, Deuteronomy, Joshua the son of Nun, Judges, Ruth, four books of Kings, two books of Paraleipomena, Job, the Psalter, five books of Solomon, the books of the twelve prophets, Isaiah, Jeremiah, Ezechiel, Daniel, Tobit, Judith, Esther, two books of Esdras, two Books of the Maccabees.

17 Of the New Testament: four books of the Gospels, one book of the Acts of the Apostles, thirteen Epistles of the Apostle Paul, one epistle of the same [writer] to the Hebrews, two Epistles of the Apostle Peter, three of John, one of James, one of Jude, one book of the Apocalypse of John.

18 So let the church over the sea be consulted to confirm this canon. Let it also be allowed that the Passions of Martyrs be read when their festivals are kept.

20 Let this be made known also to our brother and fellow-priest Boniface, or to other bishops of those parts, for the purpose of confirming that Canon. Because we have received from our fathers that those books must be read in the Church.

— Enchiridium Biblicum 8–10

The "five books of Solomon", according to Augustine, were Proverbs, Ecclesiastes, Song of Songs, Wisdom, and Sirach (or Ecclesiasticus). The two books of Esdras are interpreted by the Council of Trent as Ezra and Nehemiah. The four Books of Kings are 1 Samuel, 2 Samuel, 1 Kings and 2 Kings. The two books of Paraleipomena are 1 and 2 Chronicles.

The council determination that 'two books of Esdras' were to be considered canonical led to some debate over which two books the council referred to. Prior to the publication of Jerome's Vulgate, the Vetus Latina and the Septuagint were widely used; in these translation, the two books of Esdras are Ezra–Nehemiah and 1 Esdras, and excluded 2 Esdras. The New Cambridge History of the Bible writes that 3 Esdras and 4 Esdras were "declared apocryphal by the Council of Trent".

== Conference of 411 ==
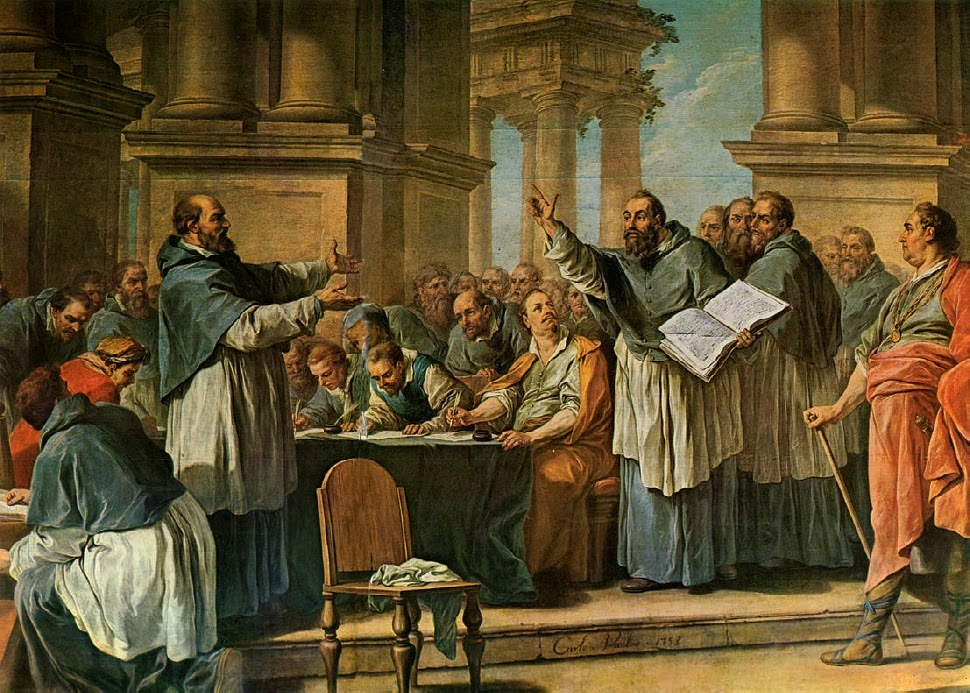
St. Augustine arguing with Donatists

The Conference of Carthage, held by the command of the Emperor Honorius in 411 with a view to terminating the Donatist schism, while not strictly a synod, was one of the most important assemblies in the history of the African sees, and of the whole Catholic Church. It was presided over by Marcellinus of Carthage who found in favour of the orthodox party, which led to the violent suppression of the Donatists.

== Council of 418 ==
Following the Synod of Diospolis, on 1 May 418 a minor synod was assembled under the presidency of Aurelius, bishop of Carthage, which Augustine of Hippo called "A Council of Africa", to take action concerning the errors of Caelestius, a disciple of Pelagius. It denounced the Pelagian doctrines of human nature, original sin, grace, and perfectibility, and it fully approved the contrary views of Augustine.

The synod issued eight canons:

- Canon I: Adam was not created subject to death.
- Canon II: Infants are to be baptized for the remission of sins.
- Canon III: Grace not only gives remission of sins but aid that we sin no more.
- Canon IV: Grace gives knowledge, inspiration and desire to perform required duty.
- Canon V: Without the grace of God we can do no good thing.
- Canon VI: The statement "If we say that we have no sin we deceive ourselves" should not be said out of humility but because it is true.
- Canon VII: In the Lord's Prayer, the Saints pray "Forgive us our trespasses" not only for others but also for themselves.
- Canon VIII: The Saints pray "Forgive us our trespasses" not out of humility but because they have sinned.

== Council of 419 ==
The Canons made at this council are often called The Code of Canons of the African Church. It was led by Aurelius, bishop of Carthage and attended by 217 bishops, which held two sessions, 25 and 30 May. "In the year 418-19, all canons formerly made in sixteen councils held at Carthage, one at Milevis, one at Hippo, that were approved of, were read, and received a new sanction from a great number of bishops, then met in synod at Carthage. This Collection is the Code of the African Church, which was always in greatest repute in all Churches next after the Code of the Universal Church. This code was of very great authority in the old English Churches, for many of the Excerptions of Egbert were transcribed from it... these African Canons are inserted into the Ancient Code both of the Eastern and Western Churches."

Here is a list of the various councils which made the enactments, with their dates.

- Carthage (under Gratus)— 345–348 a.d.
- (under Genethlius)— 387 or 390
- Hippo — 393
- Carthage— 394
  1. (26 June)— 397
  2. (28 August)— 397
  3. (27 April)— 399
  4. (15 June)— 401
  5. (13 September)— 401
  6. Milevis (27 August)— 402
  7. Carthage (25 August)— 403
  8. (June)— 404
  9. (August 25)— 405
  10. (13 June)— 407
  11. Carthage (16 June and 13 October)— 408
  12. Carthage (16 June)— 409
  13. (14 June)— 410
  14. (1 May)— 418
  15. (25 May) which adopted the African Code — 419

In total 138 Canons (counted as 135 in the Greek) were issued at this council.

Apiarius, deposed by Urbanus, Bishop of Sicca, for grave misconduct, appealed to Pope Zosimus, who, in view of irregularities in the bishop's procedure, ordered that the priest should be reinstated, and his bishop disciplined. Vexed, perhaps, at the unworthy priest's success, a general synod of Carthage in May 418 forbade appeal "beyond the seas" of clerics inferior to bishops. Recognizing in what was virtually a restatement of previous African legislation an expression of displeasure on the part of the African bishops, Pope Zosimus sent a delegation to defend his right to receive certain appeals, citing decrees believed by him to have been enacted at the Council of Nicaea, but which in fact were canons of the council of Sardica. The African bishops who met the legates, while not recognizing these decrees as Nicene, accepted them pending verification. This led to a tedious delay of the council. The sixteenth Council of Carthage was held in May 419 and there again the representations of Zosimus were accepted, awaiting the result of a comparison of the Nicene canons as they existed in Africa, in which the decrees cited by the Pope had not been found, with those of the churches of Antioch, Alexandria and Constantinople. By the end of the year 419, Pope Boniface, who had succeeded Zosimus in December 418, was informed that the eastern codices did not contain the alleged decrees; but, as the now repentant Apiarius had meantime been assigned to a new field of labour, interest in the affair subsided.

The matter was reopened a few years later, when Apiarius, who had been deposed a second time, on new charges, again appealed to Rome for reinstatement. Faustinus, the Roman legate, reappeared at the Synod of 424 and demanded the annulment of the sentence passed on the priest. Apiarius, however, broke down under examination, and admitted his guilt. A synodal letter to Rome emphasized how needful it was that Rome should not lightly credit all complainants from Africa, nor receive into fellowship such as had been excommunicated; and lastly, requested the pope to send no more legates to execute his judgments.

== Synod of 484 ==
The Vandal Synod of Carthage (484) was a largely unsuccessful church council meeting called by the Vandal King Huneric to persuade the Nicene bishops in his recently acquired North African territories to convert to Arian Christianity. The Nicene bishops refused and many, including Fulgentius of Ruspe and Tiberiumus, were exiled to Sardinia, and some executed. The Notitia Provinciarum at Civitatum Africa says that nearly 500 went into exile. The bishops had requested that Nicene bishops from outside Huneric's dominions be allowed to attend but this was refused, the king saying "When you make me master of the whole world, then what you want shall be done". The synod appears to have been an exercise in royal browbeating more than a genuine debate, with bias toward Arian bishops.

== Council of 525 ==
The 525 Council of Carthage was convened by Bishop Boniface of Carthage in order to re-establish power over North Africa's Nicene bishops after the rule of Arian Vandal bishops. The Council lasted from 5 to 6 February 525 CE.

== See also ==
- Synod of Hippo
- Ancient church councils (pre-ecumenical)
- Archdiocese of Carthage
