= Chechar District =

Chechar District دائرة ششار
- District
- Map of Algeria highlighting Khenchela Province
- Coordinates: 35°2′14″N 7°0′35.1″E
- Country: Algeria
- Province: Khenchela
- District seat: Chechar

Area
  - Total: 2,066 km^{2} (798 sq mi)

Population (1998)
  - Total: 33,812
  - Density: 16.37/km^{2} (42.39/sq mi)
- Time zone: UTC+01 (CET)
- Municipalities: 4

Chechar (Arabic: ششار; Tifinagh: ) is a district in Khenchela Province, Algeria. It was named after its capital, Chechar.

== Municipalities ==
The district is further divided into four municipalities:

- Chechar
- Djellal
- Khirane
- El Oueldja
