= October 3 =

October 3 this year in various calendars
- Saturday, 3 October 2026
Akan	Nwonamemene
Armenian	15 Sahmi 1476
Aztec	Izcalli 1, 7 Ocēlōtl
Babylonian	20 Ululu, 2337 SE
Balinese pawukon	Menga, Beteng, Menala, Pon, Aryang, Saniscara of Ugu, Yama, Tulus, Manusa
Bengali	18 Ashshin, BS 1433
Chinese	Yang Metal Dog・Stomach Mansion; Fire Horse Year, Month 8, Day 23 (Qiufen, 5 days until Hanlu)
Common Era	3 October 2026 CE
Coptic	23 Thout, AM 1743
Egyptian	20 Mechir, 2775 NE
Ethiopian	23 Maskaram, 2019 Amätä Məhrät
French Republican	Décade II, Primidi de Vendémiaire de l'Année 235 de la République
Gregorian	3 October, AD 2026
Hebrew	22 Tishrei, AM 5787
Hindu	Ārdrā・Varīyas; Solar: 17 Āśvina, 1948 SE; Lunisolar: Saptamī, Kṛishna pakṣa of Bhādrapada, 2083 VE; Rāudra・5127 KY・1,872,851
Icelandic	Laugardagur, 10 Haustmánuður 2026
Islamic	20 Rabi' al-thani, AH 1448 (using tabular method)
ISO week date	2026-W40-6
Japanese	23 Hazuki, Reiwa 8 (Shūbun, 5 days until Kanro)
Julian	20 September, AD 2026 (AM 7534)
Julian day	2461317
Korean	23 Dakdal, 4359 DE
Maya	13.0.13.17.14; 7 Yax, 7 Ix
Roman	ante diem XII Kalendas Octobres, MMDCCLXXIX AUC
Solar Hijri	11 Mehr, SH 1405
Tibetan	22 khrums, me pho rta 2153 or 1772 or 1000

<<	October					>>
Su	Mo	Tu	We	Th	Fr	Sa
				1	2	3
4	5	6	7	8	9	10
11	12	13	14	15	16	17
18	19	20	21	22	23	24
25	26	27	28	29	30	31
2026

October 3 in recent years
2026 (Saturday)
2025 (Friday)
2024 (Thursday)
2023 (Tuesday)
2022 (Monday)
2021 (Sunday)
2020 (Saturday)
2019 (Thursday)
2018 (Wednesday)
2017 (Tuesday)

October 3 is the 276th day of the year (277th in leap years) in the Gregorian calendar; 89 days remain until the end of the year.

== Events ==
=== Pre-1600 ===
- 2457 BC – Gaecheonjeol, Hwanung (환웅) purportedly descended from heaven. South Korea's National Foundation Day.
- 52 BC – Gallic Wars: Vercingetorix, leader of the Gauls, surrenders to the Romans under Julius Caesar, ending the siege and battle of Alesia.
- 42 BC – Liberators' civil war: Triumvirs Mark Antony and Octavian fight to a draw Caesar's assassins Brutus and Cassius in the first part of the Battle of Philippi, where Cassius commits suicide believing the battle is lost.
- 382 – Roman Emperor Theodosius I concludes a peace treaty with the Goths and settles them in the Balkans.
- 610 – A fleet of the Heraclian revolt under Heraclius the Younger reaches Constantinople.
- 1283 – Dafydd ap Gruffudd, the last native Prince of Wales, is hanged, drawn and quartered by the English.
- 1392 – Muhammed VII becomes the twelfth sultan of the Emirate of Granada.
- 1574 – The Siege of Leiden is lifted by the Watergeuzen.

=== 1601–1900 ===
- 1683 – Qing dynasty naval commander Shi Lang receives the surrender of the Tungning kingdom on Taiwan after the Battle of Penghu.
- 1712 – The Duke of Montrose issues a warrant for the arrest of Rob Roy MacGregor.
- 1739 – The Treaty of Niš is signed by the Ottoman Empire and Russia ending the Russian–Turkish War.
- 1789 – George Washington proclaims Thursday November 26, 1789 as Thanksgiving Day.
- 1792 – A militia departs from the Spanish stronghold of Valdivia to quell a Huilliche uprising in southern Chile.
- 1862 – American Civil War: The two-day Second Battle of Corinth begins as Confederate forces under General Earl Van Dorn attack Union defenses led by General William Rosecrans around Corinth, Mississippi.
- 1863 – The last Thursday in November is declared as Thanksgiving Day by U.S. President Abraham Lincoln.
- 1873 – Chief Kintpuash and companions are hanged for their part in the Modoc War of northern California.

=== 1901–present ===
- 1912 – U.S. forces defeat Nicaraguan rebels at the Battle of Coyotepe Hill.
- 1918 – Tsar Boris III of Bulgaria accedes to the throne.
- 1919 – Cincinnati Reds pitcher Adolfo Luque becomes the first Latin American player to appear in a World Series.
- 1929 – The Kingdom of Serbs, Croats and Slovenes is renamed to Yugoslavia by King Alexander I.
- 1932 – The Kingdom of Iraq gains independence from the United Kingdom.
- 1935 – Second Italo-Abyssinian War: Italy invades Ethiopia.
- 1942 – A German V-2 rocket reaches a record 85 km (46 nm) in altitude.
- 1943 – World War II: German forces murder 92 civilians in Lingiades, Greece.
- 1946 – An American Overseas Airlines Douglas DC-4 crashes near Ernest Harmon Air Force Base in Stephenville, Newfoundland and Labrador, Canada, killing 39.
- 1949 – WERD, the first black-owned radio station in the United States, opens in Atlanta.
- 1951 – Korean War: The First Battle of Maryang San pits Commonwealth troops against communist Chinese troops.
- 1952 – The United Kingdom successfully tests a nuclear weapon in the Montebello Islands, Western Australia, to become the world's third nuclear power.
- 1957 – The California State Superior Court rules that the book Howl and Other Poems is not obscene.
- 1962 – Project Mercury: US astronaut Wally Schirra, in Sigma 7, is launched from Cape Canaveral for a six-orbit flight.
- 1963 – A violent coup in Honduras begins two decades of military rule.
- 1981 – The hunger strike at the Maze Prison in Northern Ireland ends after seven months and ten deaths.
- 1985 – The Space Shuttle Atlantis makes its maiden flight, carrying two DSCS-III Satellites on STS-51-J.
- 1986 – TASCC, a superconducting cyclotron at the Chalk River Laboratories in Canada, is officially opened.
- 1989 – A coup in Panama City is suppressed and 11 participants are executed.
- 1990 – The German Democratic Republic is abolished and becomes part of the Federal Republic of Germany; the event is afterwards celebrated as German Unity Day.
- 1991 – Nadine Gordimer is announced as the winner of the Nobel Prize in Literature.
- 1993 – An American attack against a warlord in Mogadishu fails; eighteen US soldiers and over 350 Somalis die.
- 1995 – O. J. Simpson murder case: O. J. Simpson is acquitted of the murders of Nicole Brown Simpson and Ronald Goldman.
- 2008 – The Emergency Economic Stabilization Act of 2008 for the U.S. financial system is signed by President George W. Bush.
- 2009 – Azerbaijan, Kazakhstan, Kyrgyzstan, and Turkey join in the Turkic Council.
- 2013 – At least 360 migrants are killed when their boat sinks near the Italian island of Lampedusa.
- 2015 – Forty-two people are killed and 33 go missing in the Kunduz hospital airstrike in Afghanistan.
- 2021 – Eight people are killed in an airplane crash near Milan, Italy.
- 2022 – Svante Pääbo is awarded the Nobel Prize in Physiology or Medicine.
- 2023 – Wab Kinew is elected to be the first First Nations Premier of a Canadian province in the 2023 Manitoba general election
- 2024 – Bengali, Assamese, Marathi, Pali and Prakrit are accorded the Classical language status by the Government of India
- 2024 – "Thick of It", a single by British Internet personality and rapper KSI featuring Trippie Redd, is released.

== Births ==
=== Pre-1600 ===
- 1390 – Humphrey, Duke of Gloucester (died 1447)
- 1458 – Saint Casimir, Prince of Poland and Duke of Lithuania (died 1484)
- 1554 – Fulke Greville, 1st Baron Brooke, English poet (died 1628)

=== 1601–1900 ===
- 1610 – Gabriel Lalemant, French-Canadian missionary and saint (died 1649)
- 1631 – Sebastian Anton Scherer, German organist and composer (died 1712)
- 1637 – George Gordon, 1st Earl of Aberdeen, Lord Chancellor of Scotland (died 1720)
- 1713 – Antoine Dauvergne, French violinist and composer (died 1797)
- 1716 – Giovanni Battista Beccaria, Italian physicist and academic (died 1781)
- 1720 – Johann Uz, German poet and judge (died 1796)
- 1790 – John Ross, American tribal chief (died 1866)
- 1797 – Leopold II, Grand Duke of Tuscany (died 1870)
- 1800 – George Bancroft, American historian and politician, 17th United States Secretary of the Navy (died 1891)
- 1804 – Townsend Harris, American merchant, politician, and diplomat, United States Ambassador to Japan (died 1878)
- 1804 – Allan Kardec, French author, translator, educator and founder of modern Spiritism (died 1869)
- 1828 – Woldemar Bargiel, German composer and educator (died 1897)
- 1837 – Nicolás Avellaneda, Argentinian journalist and politician, 8th President of Argentina (died 1885)
- 1846 – James Jackson Putnam, American neurologist and academic (died 1918)
- 1848 – Henry Lerolle, French painter and art collector (died 1929)
- 1858 – Eleonora Duse, Italian actress (died 1924)
- 1862 – Alice B. Woodward, British illustrator for children and scientists (died 1931)
- 1862 – Johnny Briggs, English cricketer and rugby player (died 1902)
- 1863 – Pyotr Kozlov, Russian archaeologist and explorer (died 1935)
- 1865 – Gustave Loiseau, French painter (died 1935)
- 1866 – Josephine Sabel, American singer and comedian (died 1945)
- 1867 – Joseph Beech, American Methodist missionary and educator (died 1954)
- 1867 – Pierre Bonnard, French painter (died 1947)
- 1869 – Alfred Flatow, German gymnast (died 1942)
- 1875 – Dr. Atl, Mexican painter (died 1964)
- 1879 – Warner Oland, Swedish-American actor and singer (died 1938)
- 1880 – Nora Bayes, American singer, entertainer, and actress (died 1928)
- 1882 – A. Y. Jackson, Canadian painter and academic (died 1974)
- 1885 – Sophie Treadwell, American playwright and journalist (died 1970)
- 1886 – Alain-Fournier, French soldier, author, and critic (died 1914)
- 1888 – Wade Boteler, American actor and screenwriter (died 1943)
- 1889 – Carl von Ossietzky, German journalist and activist, Nobel Prize laureate (died 1938)
- 1890 – Emilio Portes Gil, Mexican politician, President of Mexico (died 1978)
- 1894 – Elmer Robinson, American lawyer and politician, 33rd Mayor of San Francisco (died 1982)
- 1894 – Walter Warlimont, German general (died 1976)
- 1895 – Giovanni Comisso, Italian author and poet (died 1969)
- 1895 – Sergei Yesenin, Russian poet (died 1925)
- 1896 – Auvergne Doherty, Australian businesswoman (died 1961)
- 1896 – Gerardo Diego, Spanish poet and critic (died 1987)
- 1897 – Louis Aragon, French author and poet (died 1982)
- 1898 – Leo McCarey, American director and screenwriter (died 1969)
- 1898 – Adolf Reichwein, German economist and educator (died 1944)
- 1899 – Gertrude Berg, American actress, screenwriter and producer (died 1966)
- 1900 – Thomas Wolfe, American novelist (died 1938)

=== 1901–present ===
- 1901 – Jean Grémillon, French director, composer, and screenwriter (died 1959)
- 1904 – Ernst-Günther Schenck, German colonel and physician (died 1998)
- 1905 – Tekin Arıburun, Turkish soldier and politician, President of Turkey (died 1993)
- 1906 – Natalie Savage Carlson, American author (died 1997)
- 1908 – Johnny Burke, American songwriter (died 1964)
- 1911 – Michael Hordern, English actor (died 1995)
- 1912 – Charles Wood, 2nd Earl of Halifax, British peer, Conservative politician (died 1980)
- 1915 – Ray Stark, American film producer (died 2004)
- 1916 – James Herriot, English veterinarian and author (died 1995)
- 1919 – James M. Buchanan, American economist and academic, Nobel Prize laureate (died 2013)
- 1921 – Ray Lindwall, Australian cricketer and soldier (died 1996)
- 1923 – Edward Oliver LeBlanc, Dominican lawyer and politician, 1st Premier of Dominica (died 2004)
- 1924 – Harvey Kurtzman, American cartoonist (died 1993)
- 1924 – Arkady Vorobyov, Russian weightlifter and coach (died 2012)
- 1925 – Simone Segouin (also known as Nicole Minet), French Resistance fighter and partisan (died 2023)
- 1925 – Gore Vidal, American novelist, screenwriter, and critic (died 2012)
- 1925 – George Wein, American pianist and producer, co-founded the Newport Folk Festival (died 2021)
- 1926 – Gerardo P. Cabochan, Filipino politician (died 2014)
- 1928 – Erik Bruhn, Danish dancer and choreographer (died 1986)
- 1928 – Shridath Ramphal, Guyanese academic and politician, 2nd Commonwealth Secretary-General (died 2024)
- 1931 – Glenn Hall, Canadian ice hockey player and coach (died 2026)
- 1931 – Bob Skinner, American baseball player (died 2026)
- 1933 – Neale Fraser, Australian tennis player (died 2024)
- 1934 – Benjamin Boretz, American composer and theorist
- 1934 – Miguel-Ángel Cárdenas, Colombian-Dutch painter and illustrator (died 2015)
- 1934 – Harold Henning, South African golfer (died 2004)
- 1934 – Simon Nicholson, English sculptor and painter (died 1990)
- 1935 – Charles Duke, American general, pilot, and astronaut
- 1935 – Armen Dzhigarkhanyan, Soviet Russian-Armenian actor (died 2020)
- 1936 – Steve Reich, American composer
- 1938 – Eddie Cochran, American singer-songwriter, guitarist, and actor (died 1960)
- 1938 – David Hart Dyke, English captain
- 1938 – Jack Hodgins, Canadian author and academic
- 1938 – Pedro Pablo Kuczynski, Peruvian entrepreneur and politician, 66th President of Peru
- 1939 – Bob Armstrong, American wrestler and trainer (died 2020)
- 1940 – Alan O'Day, American singer-songwriter (died 2013)
- 1940 – Jean Ratelle, Canadian ice hockey player and coach
- 1940 – Mike Troy, American swimmer (died 2019)
- 1941 – Chubby Checker, American singer-songwriter
- 1941 – Andrea de Adamich, Italian racing driver and sportscaster (died 2025)
- 1941 – John Elliott, Australian businessman (died 2021)
- 1941 – Nicolae Șerban Tanașoca, Romanian historian and philologist (died 2017)
- 1942 – Alan Rachins, American actor (died 2024)
- 1943 – Jeff Bingaman, American soldier and politician, 25th Attorney General of New Mexico
- 1943 – Baki İlkin, Turkish civil servant and diplomat
- 1944 – Pierre Deligne, Belgian mathematician and academic
- 1944 – Bob Riley, American politician, 52nd Governor of Alabama
- 1945 – Tony Brown, English footballer and sportscaster
- 1945 – Christopher Bruce, English dancer and choreographer
- 1945 – Jo Ritzen, Dutch economist and politician, Dutch Minister of Education
- 1946 – P. P. Arnold, American soul singer
- 1947 – John Perry Barlow, American poet, songwriter, blogger, and activist (died 2018)
- 1947 – Ben Cauley, American trumpet player and songwriter (died 2015)
- 1947 – Fred DeLuca, American businessman (died 2015)
- 1947 – Anne Dorte of Rosenborg (died 2014)
- 1947 – Takis Michalos, Greek water polo player and coach (died 2010)
- 1949 – Lindsey Buckingham, American singer-songwriter, guitarist, and producer
- 1949 – J. P. Dutta, Indian director, producer, and screenwriter
- 1949 – Aleksandr Rogozhkin, Russian director and screenwriter (died 2021)
- 1949 – Laurie Simmons, American photographer and director
- 1950 – Ronnie Laws, American jazz, R&B, and funk saxophone player
- 1951 – Keb' Mo', American blues musician and songwriter
- 1951 – Kathryn D. Sullivan, American geologist and astronaut
- 1951 – Dave Winfield, American baseball player and sportscaster
- 1952 – Bruce Arians, American football coach
- 1952 – Gary Troup, New Zealand cricketer
- 1954 – Eddie DeGarmo, American singer-songwriter, keyboard player, and producer
- 1954 – Dennis Eckersley, American baseball player and sportscaster
- 1954 – Al Sharpton, American minister, talk show host, and political activist
- 1954 – Stevie Ray Vaughan, American singer-songwriter, guitarist, and producer (died 1990)
- 1955 – Moshe Kam, American engineering educator
- 1955 – John S. Lesmeister, American educator and politician, 30th North Dakota State Treasurer (died 2006)
- 1955 – Allen Woody, American bass player and songwriter (died 2000)
- 1955 – Buket Uzuner, Turkish author
- 1956 – Hart Bochner, Canadian actor, director, producer, and screenwriter
- 1957 – Roberto Azevêdo, Brazilian engineer and diplomat, 6th Director-General of the World Trade Organization
- 1957 – Tim Westwood, English radio and television host
- 1958 – Chen Yanyin, Chinese sculptor
- 1958 – Louise Lecavalier, Canadian dancer and choreographer
- 1959 – Craig Bellamy, Australian rugby league player and coach
- 1959 – Fred Couples, American golfer
- 1959 – Greg Proops, American comedian, actor, and screenwriter
- 1959 – Frank Stephenson, Italian automotive designer and blogger
- 1959 – Jack Wagner, American actor and singer
- 1961 – Rebecca Stephens, English journalist and mountaineer
- 1961 – Ludger Stühlmeyer, German cantor, composer, and musicologist
- 1962 – Tommy Lee, Greek-American singer-songwriter, drummer, and producer
- 1962 – Simon Scarrow, Nigerian-English novelist
- 1963 – Benny Anders, American basketball player
- 1963 – Dan Goldie, American tennis player
- 1964 – Clive Owen, English actor
- 1965 – Annemarie Verstappen, Dutch swimmer
- 1965 – Jan-Ove Waldner, Swedish table tennis player
- 1966 – Darrin Fletcher, American baseball player and sportscaster
- 1967 – Rob Liefeld, American author and illustrator
- 1967 – Denis Villeneuve, Canadian film director and screenwriter
- 1967 – Chris Collingwood, English-American singer-songwriter, guitarist, and producer
- 1968 – Paul Crichton, English footballer and manager
- 1968 – Greg Foster, American basketball player and coach
- 1968 – Marko Rajamäki, Finnish footballer and manager
- 1968 – Donald Sild, Estonian javelin thrower
- 1969 – Garry Herbert, English rower and sportscaster
- 1969 – Janel Moloney, American actress
- 1969 – Gwen Stefani, American singer-songwriter, actress, and fashion designer
- 1969 – Tetsuya, Japanese singer-songwriter, bass player, and producer
- 1970 – Elmar Liitmaa, Estonian guitarist and songwriter
- 1970 – Jimmy Ray, English singer-songwriter and guitarist
- 1971 – Wil Cordero, Puerto Rican-American baseball player and coach
- 1971 – Kevin Richardson, American singer-songwriter and actor
- 1972 – Komla Dumor, Ghanaian-English journalist (died 2014)
- 1972 – G. Love, American singer-songwriter, guitarist, and harmonica player
- 1972 – Michael Nylander, Swedish ice hockey player and coach
- 1972 – Guy Oseary, Israeli-American talent manager and businessman
- 1973 – Keiko Agena, American actress
- 1973 – Neve Campbell, Canadian actress
- 1973 – Angélica Gavaldón, American-Mexican tennis player and coach
- 1973 – Lena Headey, British actress
- 1973 – Eirik Hegdal, Norwegian saxophonist and composer
- 1974 – John Dwyer, American multi-instrumentalist, vocalist, songwriter, visual artist, and record label owner
- 1974 – Mike Johnson, Canadian ice hockey player and sportscaster
- 1974 – Antti Laaksonen, Finnish ice hockey player
- 1974 – Marianne Timmer, Dutch speed skater
- 1975 – India Arie, American singer-songwriter, producer, and actress
- 1975 – Phil Greening, English rugby player and coach
- 1975 – Satoko Ishimine, Japanese singer-songwriter, guitarist, and producer
- 1975 – Talib Kweli, American rapper
- 1975 – Alanna Ubach, American actress
- 1976 – Herman Li, Hong Kong-English guitarist and producer
- 1976 – Seann William Scott, American actor and producer
- 1977 – Daniel Hollie, American wrestler
- 1977 – Eric Munson, American baseball player and coach
- 1977 – Luca Tognozzi, Italian footballer
- 1978 – Gerald Asamoah, Ghanaian-German footballer
- 1978 – Neil Clement, English footballer
- 1978 – Claudio Pizarro, Peruvian footballer
- 1978 – Jake Shears, American singer-songwriter
- 1978 – Shannyn Sossamon, American actress
- 1979 – Josh Klinghoffer, American guitarist, songwriter, and producer
- 1979 – John Morrison, American wrestler and actor
- 1980 – Anquan Boldin, American football player
- 1980 – Sheldon Brookbank, Canadian ice hockey player
- 1980 – Lindsey Kelk, English journalist and author
- 1980 – Danny O'Donoghue, Irish singer-songwriter and producer
- 1980 – Héctor Reynoso, Mexican footballer
- 1980 – Ivan Turina, Croatian footballer (died 2013)
- 1981 – Danny Coid, English footballer
- 1981 – Zlatan Ibrahimović, Swedish footballer
- 1981 – Andreas Isaksson, Swedish footballer
- 1981 – Jonna Lee, Swedish singer and musician
- 1981 – Ronald Rauhe, German kayaker
- 1981 – Matt Sparrow, English footballer
- 1983 – Thiago Alves, Brazilian mixed martial artist
- 1983 – Fred, Brazilian footballer
- 1983 – Mark Giordano, Canadian ice hockey player
- 1983 – Andreas Papathanasiou, Cypriot footballer
- 1983 – Tessa Thompson, American actress
- 1984 – Yoon Eun-hye, South Korean singer and actress
- 1984 – Bruno Gervais, Canadian ice hockey player
- 1984 – Jessica Parker Kennedy, Canadian actress
- 1984 – Anthony Le Tallec, French footballer
- 1984 – Chris Marquette, American actor
- 1984 – Gary Neal, American basketball player and coach
- 1984 – Ashlee Simpson, American singer-songwriter and actress
- 1985 – Courtney Lee, American basketball player
- 1986 – Lewis Brown, New Zealand rugby league player
- 1986 – Jackson Martínez, Colombian footballer
- 1987 – Starley, Australian pop singer
- 1988 – Dustin Gazley, American ice hockey player
- 1988 – ASAP Rocky, American rapper and songwriter
- 1988 – Alicia Vikander, Swedish actress
- 1989 – Nate Montana, American football player
- 1989 – Alex Trimble, Irish singer
- 1990 – Johan Le Bon, French cyclist
- 1991 – Jenny McLoughlin, English sprinter
- 1991 – Aki Takajo, Japanese singer
- 1993 – Raffaele Di Gennaro, Italian footballer
- 1994 – Victoria Bosio, Argentinian tennis player
- 1994 – Seth Jones, American ice hockey player
- 1995 – Ayo Edebiri, American actress
- 1995 – Mike Gesicki, American football player
- 1995 – Artem Zub, Russian ice hockey player
- 1997 – Jin Boyang, Chinese figure skater
- 1997 – Jonathan Isaac, American basketball player
- 1997 – Bang Chan, Australian singer and record producer based in South Korea
- 2000 – CJ Abrams, American baseball player
- 2001 – Anton Lundell, Finnish ice hockey player
- 2001 – Max Plath, Australian rugby league player
- 2001 – C. J. Stroud, American football player
- 2004 – Noah Schnapp, American actor

== Deaths ==
=== Pre-1600 ===
- 42 BC – Gaius Cassius Longinus, Roman politician (born 85 BC)
- 723 – Elias I of Antioch, Syriac Orthodox Patriarch of Antioch.
- 818 – Ermengarde, queen of the Franks
- 900 – Muhammad ibn Zayd, Tabaristan emir
- 959 – Gérard of Brogne, Frankish abbot
- 1078 – Iziaslav I of Kiev (born 1024)
- 1226 – Francis of Assisi, Italian friar and saint (born 1181 or 1182)
- 1283 – Dafydd ap Gruffydd, Welsh prince (born 1238)
- 1369 – Margaret, Countess of Tyrol (born 1318)
- 1399 – Eleanor de Bohun, English noble (born 1360)
- 1568 – Elisabeth of Valois (born 1545)
- 1596 – Florent Chrestien, French poet (born 1541)

=== 1601–1900 ===
- 1611 – Charles, Duke of Mayenne (born 1554)
- 1629 – Giorgi Saakadze, Georgian commander and politician (born 1570)
- 1649 – Giovanni Diodati, Swiss-Italian clergyman and theologian (born 1576)
- 1653 – Marcus Zuerius van Boxhorn, Dutch linguist and academic (born 1612)
- 1656 – Myles Standish, English captain (born 1584)
- 1690 – Robert Barclay, Scottish theologian and politician, 2nd Governor of East Jersey (born 1648)
- 1701 – Joseph Williamson, English politician, Secretary of State for the Northern Department (born 1633)
- 1795 – Tula, Curaçao slave leader (date of birth unknown; executed)
- 1801 – Philippe Henri, Marquis de Ségur, French general and politician, French Minister of Defence (born 1724)
- 1833 – François, Marquis de Chasseloup-Laubat, French general and engineer (born 1754)
- 1838 – Black Hawk, American tribal leader (born 1767)
- 1860 – Rembrandt Peale, American painter and curator (born 1778)
- 1867 – Hedda Hjortsberg, Swedish ballerina (born 1777)
- 1867 – Elias Howe, American engineer, invented the sewing machine (born 1819)
- 1867 – Thora Thersner, Swedish artist (born 1818)
- 1873 – Kintpuash, American tribal leader (born 1837)
- 1877 – James Roosevelt Bayley, American archbishop (born 1814)
- 1877 – Rómulo Díaz de la Vega, Mexican general and president (1855) (born 1800)
- 1881 – Orson Pratt, American mathematician and religious leader (born 1811)
- 1890 – Joseph Hergenröther, German historian and cardinal (born 1824)
- 1891 – Édouard Lucas, French mathematician and theorist (born 1842)
- 1896 – William Morris, English author and poet (born 1834)

=== 1901–present ===
- 1907 – Jacob Nash Victor, American engineer (born 1835)
- 1910 – Lucy Hobbs Taylor, American dentist (born 1833)
- 1911 – Rosetta Jane Birks, Australian suffragist (born 1856)
- 1917 – Eduardo Di Capua, Neapolitan composer, singer and songwriter (born 1865)
- 1929 – Jeanne Eagels, American actress (born 1894)
- 1929 – Gustav Stresemann, German politician, Chancellor of Germany, Nobel Prize laureate (born 1878)
- 1931 – Carl Nielsen, Danish violinist, composer, and conductor (born 1865)
- 1936 – John Heisman, American football player and coach (born 1869)
- 1953 – Arnold Bax, English composer and poet (born 1883)
- 1959 – Tochigiyama Moriya, Japanese sumo wrestler, the 27th Yokozuna (born 1892)
- 1963 – Refet Bele, Turkish general (born 1877)
- 1965 – Zachary Scott, American actor (born 1914)
- 1966 – Rolf Maximilian Sievert, Swedish physicist and academic (born 1896)
- 1967 – Woody Guthrie, American singer-songwriter and guitarist (born 1912)
- 1967 – Malcolm Sargent, English organist, composer, and conductor (born 1895)
- 1969 – Skip James, American singer-songwriter and guitarist (born 1902)
- 1979 – Nicos Poulantzas, Greek-French sociologist and philosopher (born 1936)
- 1980 – Friedrich Karm, Estonian footballer (born 1907)
- 1981 – Anna Hedvig Büll, Estonian-German missionary (born 1887)
- 1986 – Vince DiMaggio, American baseball player and manager (born 1912)
- 1987 – Jean Anouilh, French playwright and screenwriter (born 1910)
- 1987 – Kalervo Palsa, Finnish painter (born 1947)
- 1988 – Franz Josef Strauss, Bavarian lieutenant and politician, Minister President of Bavaria (born 1915)
- 1990 – Stefano Casiraghi, Italian-Monegasque businessman (born 1960)
- 1990 – Eleanor Steber, American soprano and educator (born 1914)
- 1993 – Katerina Gogou, Greek actress, poet, and author (born 1940)
- 1993 – Gary Gordon, American sergeant, Medal of Honor recipient (born 1960)
- 1993 – Randy Shughart, American sergeant, Medal of Honor recipient (born 1958)
- 1994 – John C. Champion, American producer and screenwriter (born 1923)
- 1994 – Dub Taylor, American actor (born 1907)
- 1995 – Ma. Po. Si., Indian author and politician (born 1906)
- 1997 – Michael Adekunle Ajasin, Nigerian politician, 3rd Governor of Ondo State (born 1908)
- 1998 – Roddy McDowall, English-American actor (born 1928)
- 1999 – Akio Morita, Japanese businessman, co-founded Sony (born 1921)
- 2000 – Benjamin Orr, American singer-songwriter and bass player (born 1947)
- 2001 – Costas Hajihristos, Greek actor, director, producer, and screenwriter (born 1921)
- 2002 – Bruce Paltrow, American director, producer, and screenwriter (born 1943)
- 2003 – Florence Stanley, American actress (born 1924)
- 2003 – William Steig, American sculptor, author, and illustrator (born 1907)
- 2004 – John Cerutti, American baseball player and sportscaster (born 1960)
- 2004 – Janet Leigh, American actress (born 1927)
- 2005 – Ronnie Barker, English actor and screenwriter (born 1929)
- 2005 – Nurettin Ersin, Turkish general (born 1918)
- 2006 – Lucilla Andrews, Egyptian-Scottish nurse and author (born 1919)
- 2006 – John Crank, English mathematician and physicist (born 1916)
- 2006 – Peter Norman, Australian runner (born 1942)
- 2006 – Alberto Ramento, Filipino bishop (born 1937)
- 2007 – M. N. Vijayan, Indian journalist, author, and academic (born 1930)
- 2009 – Vladimir Beekman, Estonian poet and translator (born 1929)
- 2010 – Ben Mondor, Canadian-American businessman (born 1925)
- 2010 – Abraham Sarmiento, Filipino lawyer and jurist (born 1921)
- 2012 – Abdul Haq Ansari, Indian theologian and scholar (born 1931)
- 2012 – Robert F. Christy, American physicist and astrophysicist (born 1916)
- 2012 – Albie Roles, English footballer (born 1921)
- 2013 – Sari Abacha, Nigerian footballer (born 1978)
- 2013 – Sergei Belov, Russian basketball player and coach (born 1944)
- 2013 – Joan Thirsk, English cryptologist, historian, and academic (born 1922)
- 2014 – Ewen Gilmour, New Zealand comedian and television host (born 1963)
- 2014 – Benedict Groeschel, American priest, psychologist, and talk show host (born 1933)
- 2014 – Jean-Jacques Marcel, French footballer (born 1931)
- 2014 – Kevin Metheny, American businessman (born 1954)
- 2014 – Ward Ruyslinck, Belgian author (born 1929)
- 2015 – Denis Healey, English soldier and politician, Shadow Chancellor of the Exchequer (born 1917)
- 2015 – Muhammad Nawaz Khan, Pakistani historian and author (born 1943)
- 2015 – Javed Iqbal, Pakistani philosopher and judge (born 1925)
- 2021 – Todd Akin, American politician (born 1947)
- 2021 – Dan Petrescu, Romanian businessman and billionaire (born 1953)
- 2023 – Thomas Gambino, American mobster, Gambino crime family (born 1929)
- 2024 – Michel Blanc, French actor, writer and director (born 1952)
- 2024 – Pierre Christin, French comics creator and writer (born 1938)
- 2024 – Cid Moreira, Brazilian journalist and television anchor (born 1927)
- 2024 – Mary O'Rourke, Irish politician (born 1937)
- 2025 – Patricia Routledge, English actress and singer (born 1929)

== Holidays and observances ==
- Christian feast day:
  - Abd-al-Masih
  - Adalgott
  - Ambrósio Francisco Ferro
  - Blessed Szilárd Bogdánffy
  - Dionysius the Areopagite
  - Ewald the Black and Ewald the Fair
  - John Raleigh Mott (Episcopal Church)
  - Gerard of Brogne
  - Hesychius of Sinai
  - Théodore Guérin
  - Maximian of Bagai
  - October 3 (Eastern Orthodox liturgics)
- 3 October Festival (Leiden, Netherlands)
- German Unity Day (Germany)
- Mean Girls Day
- Morazán Day (Honduras)
- National Day, celebrates the independence of Iraq from the United Kingdom in 1932.
- National Foundation Day or Gaecheonjeol (South Korea)
