= Marculus of Thamugadi =

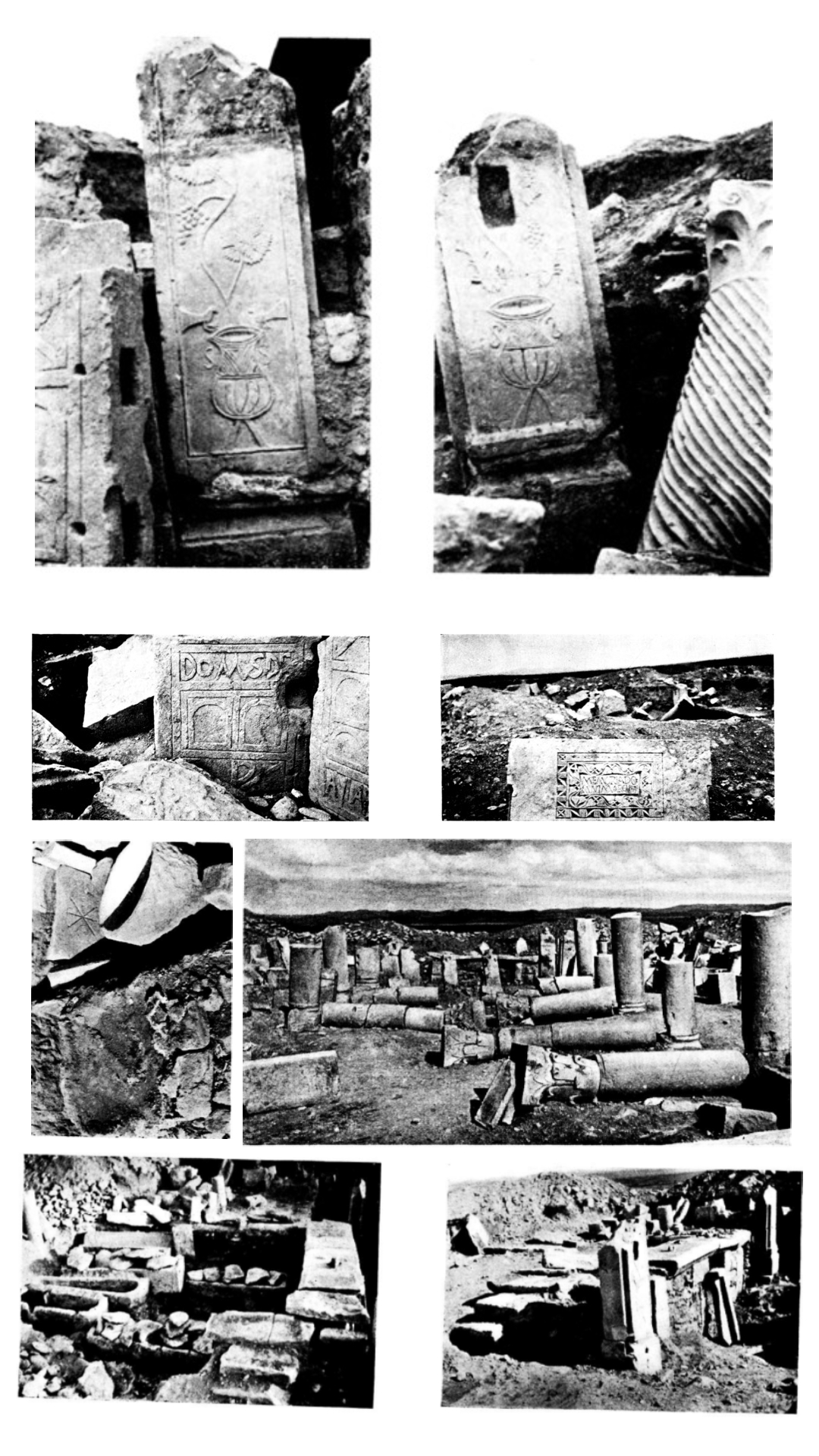
- Basilica of Vegesela 1933

Bishop of Thamugadi
- Hometown: Thamugadi
- Died: November 29, 347; Nova Petra - Numidia
- Cause of death: Thrown from a cliff
- Honored in: Donatism
- Major shrine: Ksar El Kelb - Tebessa (Vegesela)
- Influenced: Passio Benedicti Martyris Marculi

Marculus of Thamugadi, or simply Marculus, was a bishop and Christian martyr from Thamugadi in the Roman province of Numidia, venerated by the 4th-century North African Donatist Church.

Donatism flourished in North Africa for over 20 years, popular among the Berbers, with Thamagudi and Bagai emerging as centers of the movement. In 346 CE, the founder of the Donatist Church, Donatus Magnus, asked Roman Emperor Constans for recognition. Constans, before answering Donatus, sent two imperial notaries named Paul and Macarius to Numidia to investigate the situation. Their subsequent effort to enforce church unity in North Africa by suppressing the Donatist cult was known as the Macarian campaign. Paul and Macarius openly favored the Catholic faction and faced hostility from the majority-Donatist locals. The legates called for military assistance to pacify the region, and Bishop Donatus of Bagai rallied the local circumcellion militias in defense. Donatus of Bagai and his men were massacred by the Roman army in 347 CE. On June 29 of that year, a group of Donatist bishops, headed by Bishop Marculus, met with Paul and Macarius at Vegesela, Numidia, to protest the massacre. The bishops were taken into custody; most of them were tortured but were eventually released. Marculus was retained for several months and finally executed at Nova Petra on 29 November 347 CE. According to the "Passio Marculi", Marculus was killed by being thrown from a cliff by Roman soldiers, a unique method of execution among extant Donatist martyrologies. After his death, Marculus was venerated as a martyr in the Donatist Church, which for several more centuries.

== Veneration and legacy ==
Evidence of a once-strong Donatist cult dedicated to the martyred Marculus was discovered in a Donatist church near Ksar el Kelb (Tebessa, Algeria). The church featured nine graves belonging to the nine friends of Marculus and a memorial with the inscription Memoria Domni Marchuli.

Marculus' martyrdom had a long-lasting effect on the Donatist church and its attitude towards Catholics. At the Carthage conference in 411 CE, Dativus, the Donatist bishop of Nova Petra, proudly proclaimed:

"I do not have a Caecilianist [Roman Catholic] rival. This place belongs to Lord Marculus, whose blood God will exact on the Day of Judgment."

Petilianus, the Donatist bishop of Cirta, on his part, assured Augustine in one of the letters they exchanged that there could be no alliance with the "Macarian Catholics" as Petilianus intoned:

"They are the descendants of that Murderer who slaughtered Bishop Donatus of Bagai in his own see and hurled Bishop Marculus over a Numidian precipice."

Marculus' martyrdom is described in the contemporary Donatist account "Passio benedicti martyris Marculi". Like other Donatist martyrologies, the purpose of this narrative was to connect contemporary martyrs to those who suffered under earlier pagan authorities. Using apocalyptic imagery, the "Passio Marculi" portrays Emperor Constans as a "dragon" who unleashes "two beasts" against the true church, and depicts the Macarian persecution as a signal of the Last Judgment. The extreme antipathy towards Constans, denouncing him as "Antichrist", finds parallels in the writings of Cyprian and Tertullian.

According to Catholic tradition, Marculus was not killed by Roman soldiers but instead committed suicide. They claimed that after the cessation of Roman persecutions in 321 CE, the Donatists, frustrated at their new inability to attain martyrdom, resorted to committing suicide and claiming to be persecuted. Augustine of Hippo was aware of both the Catholic account of Marculus' death as a suicide and the Donatist account of his martyrdom, but he expressed no certain judgment.
