= El Hamma District =

El Hamma District دائرة الحامة
- District
- Map of Algeria highlighting Khenchela Province
- Country: Algeria
- Province: Khenchela
- District seat: El Hamma

Population (1998)
  - Total: 33,590
- Time zone: UTC+01 (CET)
- Municipalities: 4

El Hamma is a district in Khenchela Province, Algeria. It was named after its capital, El Hamma.

== Municipalities ==
The district is further divided into 4 municipalities:

1. El Hamma
2. Ensigha
3. Tamza
4. Baghai

== See also ==
- Hammam Essalihine
