= Kaïs District =

Coordinates: 35°30′N 6°55′E

Kaïs District دائرة قايس
- District
- Map of Algeria highlighting Khenchela Province
- Country: Algeria
- Province: Khenchela
- District seat: Kaïs

Population (1998)
  - Total: 44,258
- Time zone: UTC+01 (CET)
- District code: 40200
- Municipalities: 3

Kaïs is a district (daira) in Khenchela Province, Algeria. It was named after its capital, Kaïs.

== Municipalities ==
The district is further divided into 3 municipalities:

- Kaïs
- Rémila
- Taouzient(Fais)
