= Ksar-El-Kelb =

Locality of Tunisia

Ksar-El-Kelb is an archaeological site in Khenchela, Algeria. It existed in the Roman province of Numidia and is highly believed to be the location of the Ancient city and former bishopric of Vegesela in Numidia, which remains a Latin Catholic titular see.

== History ==
The modern name translates to Castle of the Dog, and was known in antiquity as Vegesela when it was a Roman Era Imperial estate and a station on the African Limes between Bagai and Theveste in Algeria located at 35.37199,7.485505.

The town had a rectangular Basilica and was a center of Donatist beliefs. Three inscriptions were uncovered in this site; on the door of the basilica, a Constantinian monogram and the inscription “Domus Dei” and “Aula Pacis”, while the keystone to an internal arch was inscribed “Deo laudes h(ic) omnes dicamu(s)”. This was already enough to convince scholars that this was in fact a Donatist church. Of greater interest, however, was the discovery of the third inscription, a memoria, at the end of the southern part of the building: “Memoria domni Machuli” — domnus being equivalent to sanctus or martyr. This left no doubt that at Ksar el Kelb the cult of the Donatist bishop and martyr Marculus of Thamugadi was practised. At the Council of Carthage the Donatist bishop of Nova Petra also remembered Marculus in similar words.

The Church Building was a memorial to, and a burial for the Martyr Marculus, Identification is based on the finding of the memoria. The memoria of Marculus was characterised by a hole, inside of which were found a few bones and pieces of glass, possibly the relics of Marculus himself.

In 347 imperial emissary, Macarius, sent by Constans, stopped here during his purge of the Donatists. Marculus and 9 other bishops, including Donatus of Bagai were executed and tortured by Macarius. an event that damaged relationships between Donatist and Roman Catholics till the Muslim conquest of the Maghreb, 300 years later.

The event was still the basis of hostilities generations later and in many ways birthed the Donatist idea of resistance to the state.

In Roman Antiquity the town and bishopric of Germania in Numidia was nearby.
