= Aïn Touila District =

Aïn Touila District دائرة عين طويلة
- District
- Map of Algeria highlighting Khenchela Province
- Country: Algeria
- Province: Khenchela
- District seat: Aïn Touila

Population (1998)
  - Total: 20,307
- Time zone: UTC+01 (CET)
- Municipalities: 2

(2019)

Aïn Touila is a district in Khenchela Province, Algeria. It was named after its capital, Aïn Touila.

== Municipalities ==
The district is further divided into 2 municipalities:

- Aïn Touila
- M'Toussa
