= Kais =

Kais or KAIS may refer to:

== Places ==
- Kais, Khenchela, a town in Algeria
  - Kaïs District
- Kai Islands, an island group in Indonesia

== People ==
- Angela Kais (born 1980), Malaysian former footballer
- Kaarel Kais (born 1974), Estonian volleyball player
- Kristjan Kais (born 1976), Estonian beach volleyball player
- Kais Nashef (born 1978), Palestinian and German actor
- Kais Saied (born 1958), president of Tunisia
- Kais Yâakoubi (born 1966), Tunisian former footballer
- Kais al-Zubaidi (1939–2024), Iraqi film director

== Other uses ==
- Kais language
- KAIS International School
- KAIS (FM), a radio station (90.3 FM) licensed to serve Salem, Oregon, United States
- KYKL (FM), a radio station (90.7 FM) licensed to serve Tracy, California, United States, which held the call sign KAIS from 2010 to 2016
- KAKI (FM), a radio station (88.1 FM) licensed to serve Juneau, Alaska, United States, which held the call sign KAIS from 2008 to 2010

== See also ==
- Kai (disambiguation)
