= Ignia gens =

Ancient Roman family

The gens Ignia was an obscure plebeian family at ancient Rome. No members of this gens appear in history, but a number are known from inscriptions.

== Origin ==
The nomen Ignius is derived from ignis, fire, and belongs to a large class of gentilicia derived from the names of ordinary objects, although as is often the case, one cannot determine from the name whether the original bearer was so called because he was vigorous, temperamental, had red hair, or resembled fire in some other respect. Although a great number of Ignii appear in inscriptions from Gaul, several come from the towns of Beneventum and Aeclanum in Samnium, indicating that the Ignii were likely descended from the Samnites, or perhaps from Latin colonists in the region.

== Praenomina ==
The main praenomina of the Ignii were Aulus, Quintus, Lucius, and Gaius, all of which were common throughout Roman history. Aulus is found among the Ignii in Samnium; elsewhere they relied on Quintus, Lucius, and Gaius, although there is an instance of Sextus from Gallia Narbonensis.

== Members ==
This list includes abbreviated praenomina. For an explanation of this practice, see filiation.

- Ignia, named in a fragmentary inscription from Rome.
- Quintus Ignius, named in an inscription from Lugdunum in Gallia Lugdunensis.
- Ignius Sex. l. Catulus, a freedman buried at Narbo in Gallia Narbonensis.
- Lucius Ignius Charito, together with Claudianus Dulcitius, dedicated a monument at Lugdunum to their brother-in-law, Aufidius Militaris, aged twenty-two.
- Ignia L. l. Clymene, a freedwoman buried in a sepulchre at Rome, along with several freedmen and freedwomen, including Lucius Ignius Theseus.
- Aula Ignia A. f. Crispina, buried at Aeclanum in Samnium, along with her sister, Theia Justina, in a tomb dedicated by their parents, Aulus Ignius Crispinus and Theia Justina, and Gaius Trebatius, apparently a half-brother or uncle.
- Aulus Ignius Crispinus, together with his wife, Theia Justina, and Gaius Trebatius, perhaps a stepson or brother-in-law, dedicated a tomb at Aeclanum for his daughters, Aula Ignia Crispina and Theia Justina.
- Aulus Ignius A. l. Epicadus, a freedman buried at Beneventum in Samnium during the first century, along with his fellow freedmen, Aulus Ignius Segalus and Liconia Fausta.
- Quintus Ignius Epictetus, buried at Arelate in Gallia Narbonensis, in a tomb dedicated by his heirs.
- Aulus Ignius Felix, together with his wife, Domitia Quintilla, dedicated a tomb at Beneventum for their foster son, whose name has not been preserved, aged fourteen years, nine months, and two days.
- Lucius Ignius L. l. Firmius, a freedman buried at Narbo.
- Lucius Ignius Firmus, named in an inscription from Nemausus in Gallia Narbonensis.
- Ignia Helpis, a freedwoman who dedicated a tomb at Lugdunum to Quintus Ignius Silvinus, who had been freed along with her, and served as one of the Seviri Augustales at Lugdunum.
- Ignia Helpis, buried at Narbo, together with her husband, Quintus Ignius Merops.
- Quintus Ignius Merops, buried at Narbo, together with his wife, Ignia Helpis.
- Quintus Ignius Onesimus, a soldier in the century of Gnaeus Pompeius Pelas, stationed at Rome in AD 70.
- Quintus Ignius C. l. Pullo, a freedman buried at Narbo, with a monument from his client, the freedwoman Urisca.
- Ignia Salvia, a freedwoman named in a sepulchral inscription from Rome.
- Aulus Ignius A. l. Segalus, a freedman buried at Beneventum during the first century, along with his fellow freedmen, Aulus Ignius Epicadus and Liconia Fausta.
- Gaius Ignius Septiminus, a native of Bagai, was a soldier in the eighth cohort of the Legio III Augusta, named in an inscription from Lambaesis in Numidia.
- Quintus Ignius Sextus, dedicated a monument at Burdigala in Gallia Aquitania to his brother, Lucius Julius Mutacus Sequanus, dating to the reigns of Septimius Severus or Caracalla.
- Quintus Ignius Silvinus, a freedman, was one of the Seviri Augustales at Lugdunum, where he was buried in a tomb dedicated by Ignia Helpis, who had been freed along with him.
- Gaius Ignius C. f. Sisenna, an aedile, prefect, and duumvir at Narbo.
- Ignia Q. l. Sura, a freedwoman buried at Narbo, along with Lucius Rubrius, perhaps her husband.
- Lucius Ignius L. l. Theseus, a freedman buried in a sepulchre at Rome, together with several other freedmen and freedwomen, including Ignia Clymene.
- Ignius Viatorianus, stator alae, a disciplinary officer in charge of a wing of the Roman army at Apamea in Syria in AD 252.

== See also ==
- List of Roman gentes

== Bibliography ==
- Theodor Mommsen et alii, Corpus Inscriptionum Latinarum (The Body of Latin Inscriptions, abbreviated CIL), Berlin-Brandenburgische Akademie der Wissenschaften (1853–present).
- René Cagnat et alii, L'Année épigraphique (The Year in Epigraphy, abbreviated AE), Presses Universitaires de France (1888–present).
- George Davis Chase, "The Origin of Roman Praenomina", in Harvard Studies in Classical Philology, vol. VIII, pp. 103–184 (1897).
- La Carte Archéologique de la Gaule (Archaeological Map of Gaul, abbreviated CAG), Académie des Inscriptions et Belles-Lettres (1931–present).
- John C. Traupman, The New College Latin & English Dictionary, Bantam Books, New York (1995).
