= Abacha (disambiguation) =

Abacha is a town in Nigeria. Abacha may also refer to:

== People ==
- Maryam Abacha (born 1949), widow of Sani Abacha
- Mohammed Abacha, son of Sani Abacha
- Sani Abacha (1943–1998), Nigerian military dictator
- Sari Abacha (1978–2013), Nigerian footballer

== Other uses ==
- Abacha (food), type of food
