= Ouled Rechache District =

Coordinates: 35°21′52″N 6°46′43″E

Oulad Rechache District دائرة أولاد رشاش
- District
- Map of Algeria highlighting Khenchela Province
- Country: Algeria
- Province: Khenchela
- District seat: Oulad Rechache

Area
  - Total: 656 km^{2} (253 sq mi)

Population (1998)
  - Total: 52,993
  - Density: 80.8/km^{2} (209/sq mi)
- Time zone: UTC+01 (CET)
- Municipalities: 2

Oulad Rechache is a district (Arabic: دائرة, romanized: daïra) in eastern Khenchela, Algeria. It is one of the oldest areas in this state in the Middle Algeria that emerged as a district in 1990. It is adjacent to the state capital, and includes two municipalities. This district is located in a border area between Khanshalah and Tebessa and was important in fight against France during the Algerian Revolution. It is one of the most important areas to maintain the Tamazight language comparing to the state capital, where use of Chaouïa is widely relevant in all aspects of daily life.

Its name comes from the largest throne in the community of the Amazigh, before becoming the name of the district.

== Climate ==
Oued Rechache District is characterized by the steppe climate which prevails in the Aures highlands. This climate is transitional between the Mediterranean climate and the dry desert climate that is characterized by continental rain conditions ranging from 300 to 500 mm per year. Rain is not regular, with monthly extreme thermal sensitivity, and most days of the winter feature ice. This climate entails hot dry in summers exceeding 35 °C (95 °F), with cold, snowy winters, where temperatures sometimes reach to less than −3 °C (27 °F).

== Community ==
The population of Olad Rechache district is 52,993 according to 1998 statistics. The people are mainly Amazigh.

== Administrative division ==
The district is further divided into two municipalities and four villages, respectively:

=== Municipalities ===
- Ouled Rechache as a municipality & Capital of District.
- El Mahmal municipality located 12 km west of district.

=== Villages ===
- Ras Elma as a village located 7 km east of district.
- Elmayta as a village located 60 km south of district.
- Icherthithen as a village located 15 km west of district.
- Boudakhan as a village located 40 km south of district.
- Oulad azddin as a village located 11 km east west of district.

== Oulad Rechache industries ==
Oulade Rechache's industries produce notably:

- Flour and its derivatives.
- Meat of all kinds
- Vegetables of all kinds.
- Beverages.
- There is also much handicraft production.
