= Hammam Essalihine =

Thermal springs in Algeria

- حمام الصالحين; Aquae Flavianae
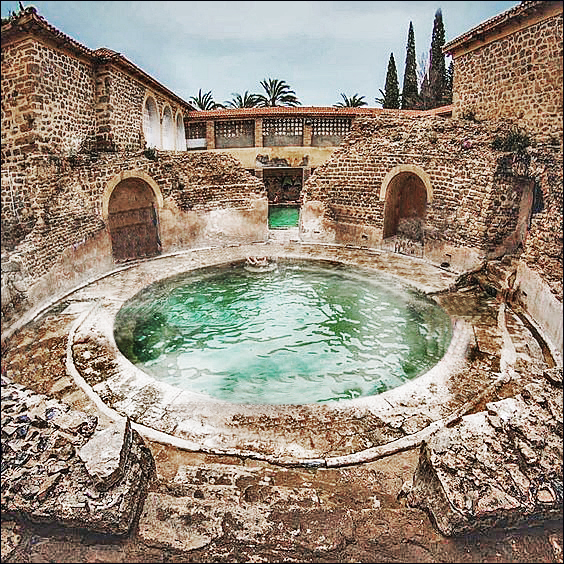
- The circular pool at Hammam Essalihine

- Location within Algeria

General information
- Location: near El Hamma, Khenchela, Algeria
- Coordinates: 35.4403°N 7.0844°E
- Completed: c. 70 CE
- Client: Flavian Dynasty

Hammam Essalihine (Arabic: حمام الصالحين Ḥammām aṣ-Ṣāliḥīn, lit. "The Bath of the Righteous"; Latin: Aquae Flavianae) is an ancient Roman bath situated in the Aurès Mountains in the El Hamma District in the Khenchela Province of Algeria. As the Latin name suggests, it dates from the time of the Flavian Dynasty.

== See also ==
- List of Roman public baths

=== External links ===
- Compilation of images, videos, maps of articles on Hammam Essalihine
