= Bagai =

Berber-Roman city in North Africa

Coordinates: 35.534434°N 7.1173845°E

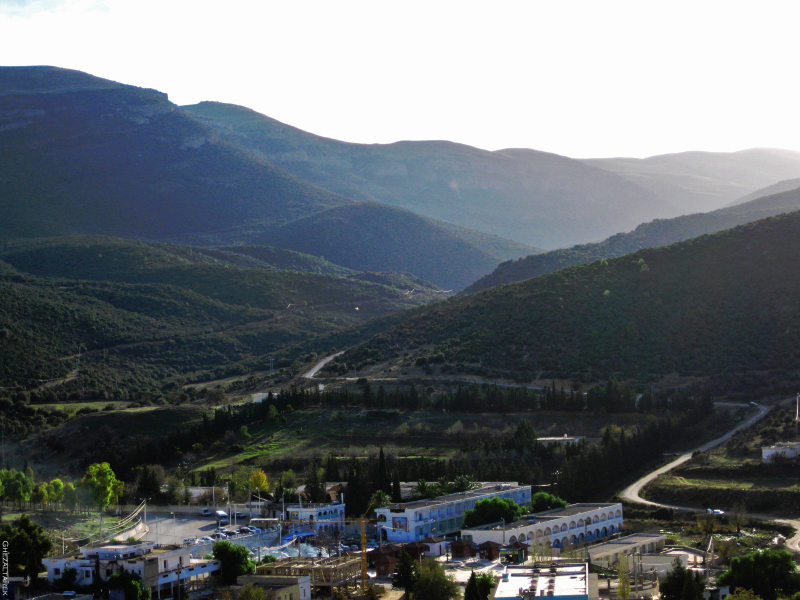
- Landscape around Bagai

- Location within Algeria
- Type: Settlement
- Periods: Roman Empire, Vandal Kingdom, Byzantine Empire, Umayyad dynasty
- Location: Khenchela Province, Algeria
- Region: Maghreb

Bagai was a Roman–Berber city in the province of Africa Proconsularis. It must have been of some reasonable size, as it was also the seat of an ancient Catholic bishopric. The ancient city has been identified with ruins at Ksar-Bagaï outside of Baghai, in the Aurès Mountains of the El Hamma District in Khenchela Province, Algeria.

== Location ==
Bagai is a town in Numidia between the Aurès Mountains in the south and the salt lake Garaat al-Tarf in the north. Bagaï is identified with Ksar Baghai in modern-day central Algeria, not far from Thamugadi (Timgad).

6 kilometers to the south of Bagai is Hammam Essalihine the ruins of an ancient Roman bath that dates from the time of the Flavian dynasty. The town of Aquae Flavianae was also near these ruins.

== History ==
In the 2nd century, the city possessed monuments and dedications to the Roman Emperors Lucius Verus and Marcus Aurelius.

Around 384, Donatist schism caused a conflict in the region. Emperor Constans sent emissaries to reconcile the two religious parties, but the dissent led to open revolt. The massacre of Bagai resulted. The Council of Bagaï was held on 24 April 394 to discuss the Donatist question. The city was a stronghold of Donatism and in 411, a Donatist bishop was sent from Bagai to the Council of Carthage.

The city was the most important capital in the conflict between Donatists and Catholics during the Late Empire. In the election of Primianus of Carthage, the region burst into flames again. The Berbers destroyed the city and ransacked the library.

In the 5th century, Baghai was invaded by the Vandals, who were later driven out by the Berbers. In 538, Guntarith, an officer of Byzantine general Solomon who reconquered the ancient Roman Africa settled his camp near the deserted city, but was defeated by the Berbers who regained control of the city, and strengthened it by surrounding it with an enclosure. It is the starting point of his second campaign in the Aurès.

In the Middle Ages, the Umayyads attacked the city. The Berber queen Kahina rebelled against Hasan ibn al-Nu'man (governor of the Maghreb) in 698. The Berbers destroyed the city and left nothing to the Umayyads. Subsequently, the Fatimids took the city in 903.

In 943, Abu Yazid took the city, but after his death the city fell into the hands of the Zirids and then in 1015 to the Hammadids. The latter attacked the inhabitants of the city. Subsequently, the Banu Hilal destroyed the whole city. Al Idrissi mentions that there was a double wall around the city in his writings before it was destroyed.

== Etymology ==
The city was called by Augustine Vagaïa. Procope of Caesarea transcribed it Bagaè and the Arab historians (Ibn Khaldun, Al-Bakri, etc.) wrote Baghaïa.

== Bishopric ==
Bagai was the seat of an ancient Catholic bishopric in Numidia, and a center of Donatism.

Bagai was the home of Donatus of Bagai fl 347 and Marculus of Bagai fl 347. Augustine wrote of many leading citizens of Bagai.

In 340 Bagai was the site of a massacre by imperial legate Macarius which forever fractured the possibility of conciliation between Donatist and Catholic factions and made the schism increasingly violent.

In 401, divisions were still so strong in Bagai that when the Donatist bishop Maximian of Bagai converted to Catholicism he was twice nearly murdered, such that Augustine once said of him "He has more scars than limbs".

The Donatist Council of Bagai was held with 310 bishops in 394 AD. The Council of Bagai condemned Maximianist and supported Primian of Carthage as Primate of Africa.

The diocese survives today as a titular see of the Roman Catholic Church.

=== Bishops of Bagai ===
- Donatus of Bagai fl.347
- Maximian of Bagai fl.414
- Castorius (brother of Maximian)
- Hugh Boyle (1948–1951)
- Noël Laurent Boucheix (1953–1958)
- Bernardo Regno,(1958–1971)
- Lolesio (Laurent) Fuahea (1972–1974)
- Francis Xavier Roque (1983–2019)
- David de la Torre Altamirano (18 Oct 2019– )
