= Muhammad Nawaz Khan =

Muhammad Nawaz Khan may refer to:

- Muhammad Nawaz Khan (politician)
- Muhammad Nawaz Khan (writer) (1943–2015)
- Muhammad Nawaz Khan Kakar
