= Ksar Bou-Saïd =

Village in Tunisia

Ksar-Bou-Saïd is a village in Tunisia on the wadi Oued Bou Saïd south of Tataouine, in the Sahel semi-arid region bordering the Sahara.

It existed in the Roman province of Numidia and has been suggested as a plausible location (along Ksar-El-Kelb and Henchir-El-Abiodh) of the Ancient city and former bishopric of Vegesela in Numidia, which remains a Latin Catholic titular see.
