= Chelia =

Coordinates: 35°21′52″N 6°46′43″E

- Commune and town
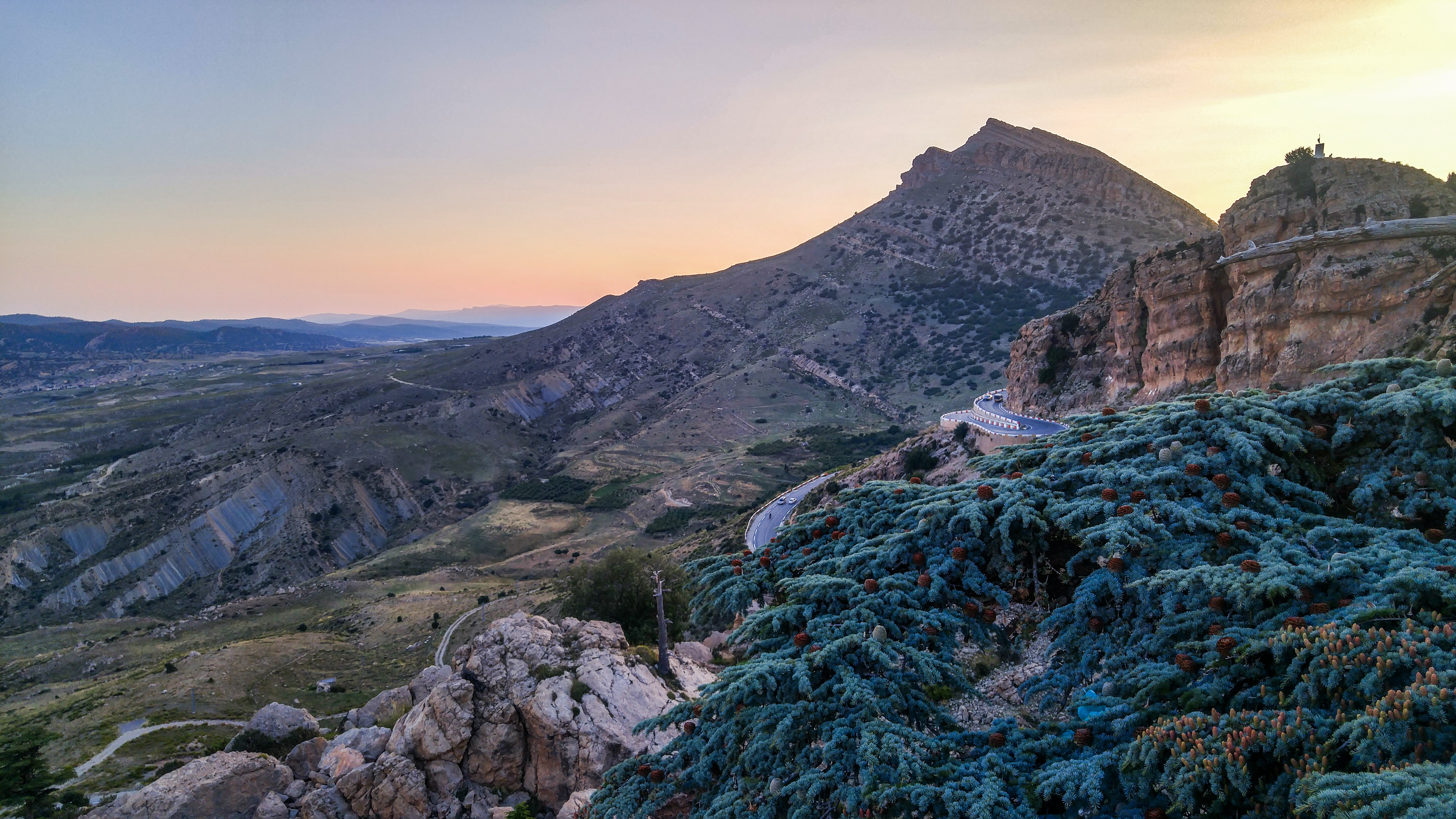

- Country: Algeria
- Province: Khenchela Province

Population (1998)
  - Total: 4,851
- Time zone: UTC+1 (CET)

Chelia is a town and commune in Khenchela Province, Algeria. According to the 1998 census it had a population of 4,851.

== Wildlife ==
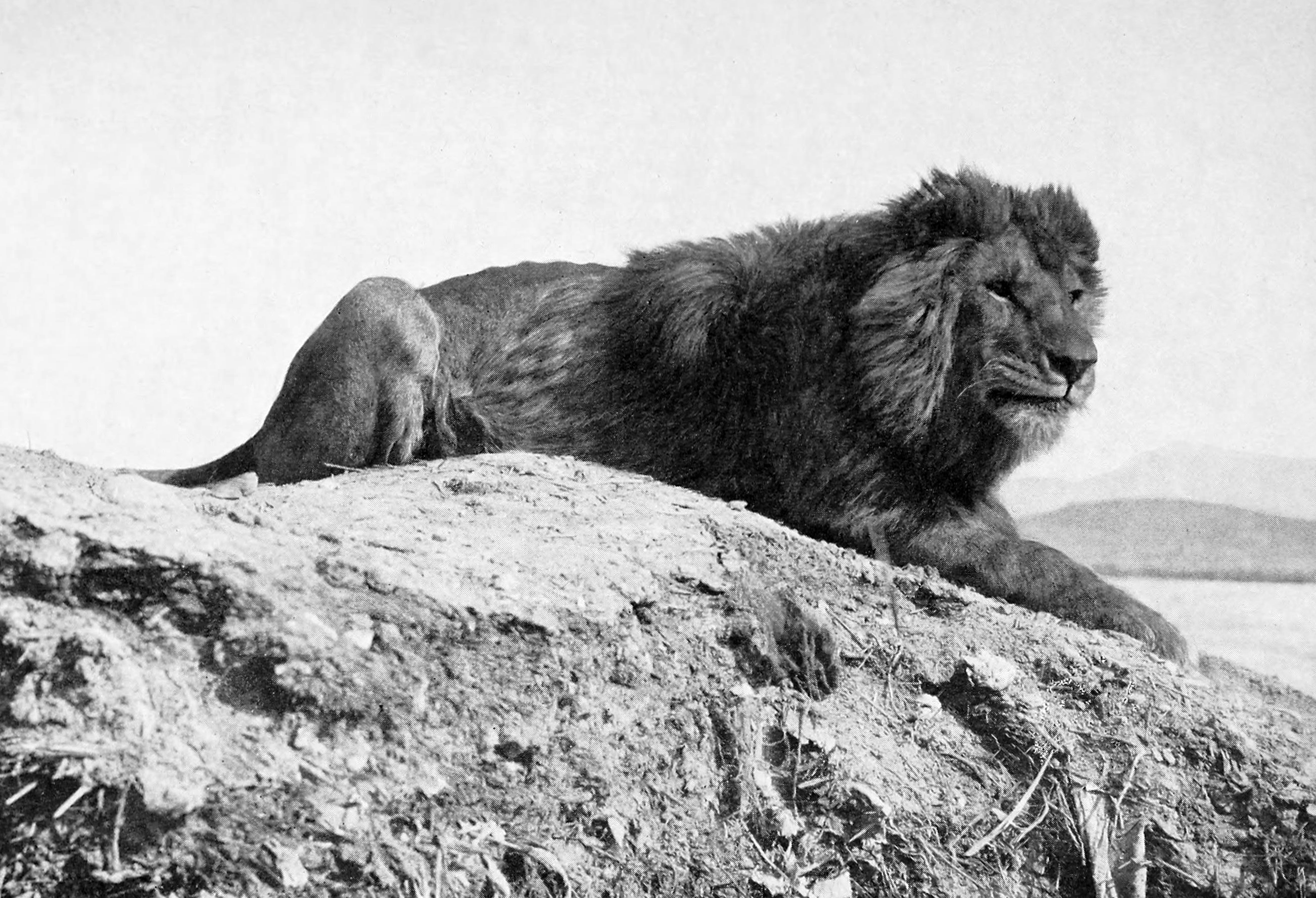
A male Barbary lion photographed by Alfred Edward Pease in 1893

The Barbary lion was present in the cedar forests and mountains near Chelia until about 1884.

== See also ==
- Aurès Mountains
