= Khenchela District =

- District
- Interactive map of Khenchela District
- Country: Algeria
- Province: Khenchela Province
- Time zone: UTC+1 (CET)

Khenchela District is a district of Khenchela Province, Algeria.
