= Bouhmama =

Bouhmama بوحمامة
- Commune and town
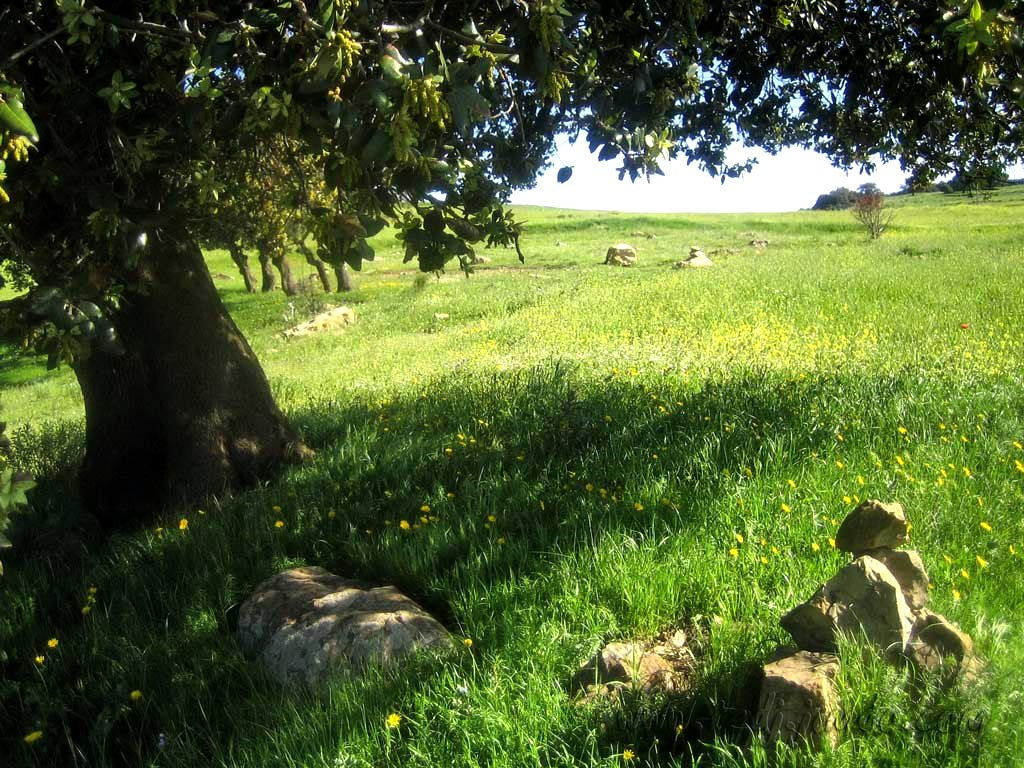

- Location within Algeria
- Coordinates: 35°19′13″N 6°44′48″E
- Country: Algeria
- Province: Khenchela Province

Area
  - Total: 158 sq mi (409 km^{2})

Population (2008)
  - Total: 10,614
- Time zone: UTC+1 (CET)
- Postal Code: 40240

Bouhmama is a town and commune in Khenchela Province, Algeria. According to the 1998 census it has a population of 9,669.
