= Donatus of Bagai =

Ancient Christian bishop

Bishop of Bagai
- Died: Spring or Summer 347
- Cause of death: Drowned in a well
- Honored in: Donatism

Donatus of Bagaï, also known as Donatus of Aurasium, was an ancient Donatist bishop and martyr whose life and actions played a significant role in the complex religious landscape of 4th century Numidia. Despite being primarily known through hostile reports, notably found in Optatus' "Contra Parmenianum Donatistam" Donatus of Bagai left a lasting impact on the Donatist movement.

== Background ==
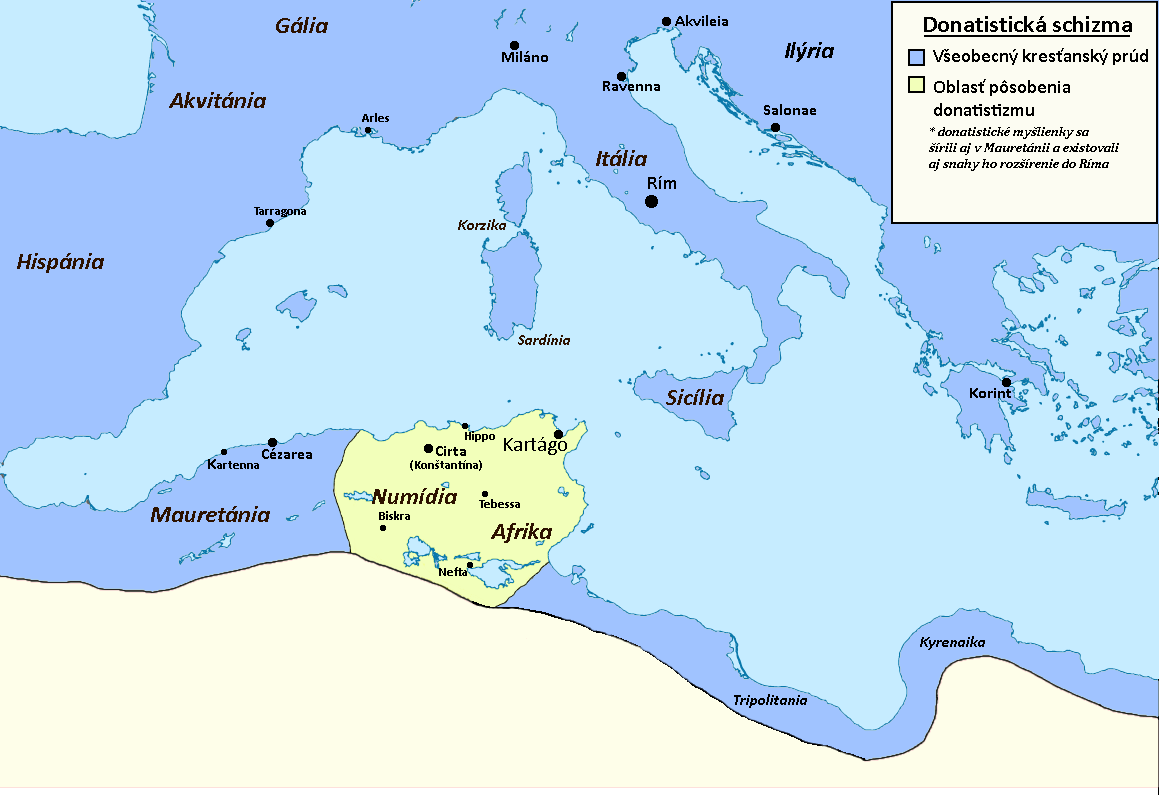
Donatist schism

In 321, Emperor Constantine, faced with the failure of the campaign against the Donatists and more pressing military concerns, temporarily suspended laws against them. This initiated a quarter-century period (321–346) during which Donatists and Catholics coexisted in a modus vivendi, with some areas being predominantly Catholic and others Donatist.

=== Growth of Donatism ===
Donatism flourished without significant state interference until 346, with Bagai being one of two holy Donatist cities, alongside Timgad in southern Numidia, where important Donatist councils were held.

== Macarian Campaign and Renewed Strife (346-348) ==
Emperor Constans tried to restore the unity of the church in North Africa in several ways. According to the Donatist’s claim, the persecution of the dissenting party was probably part of his plan. In 346 A. D. Donatus Magnus, the eponym of the movement, approached the Emperor for recognition. Constans did not immediately reject this appeal. In 347, Constans sent two commissioners, Paulus and Macarius, with a considerable amount of money to make an equal distribution among the Donatist and Catholic churches. In the eyes of Donatus of Bagai, this act was already a successful step toward recognition, and therefore he rejected the insolent bribery and forbade his followers to receive it. He quoted Tertullian’s famous words:

“What has the emperor to do with the church?”.

Paulus’ and Macarius’ journey became truly problematic; when the commissioners traveled in the Aures region between Theveste (Tebessa) and Thamugadi (Timgad) the reaction of local communities proved overtly hostile and the commissioners sought military assistance to investigate and pacify the countryside. The Donatists responded, with Donatus, Bishop of Bagai, calling for help from what was called ‘Circumcelliones’, who barricaded themselves in a basilica, which was stormed by soldiers. Donatus of Bagai and his defenders were massacred. When other Donatist bishops protested Macarius had them flogged and, later, the Donatist bishop Marculus of Thamugadi was martyred in 347. A decree proclaiming the unity of the two churches under Gratus caused riots in Carthage, which were suppressed as well resulting in a dozen martyrs.

After the unsuccessful attempt to pay a considerable amount of money to the Donatists for maintaining peace with the Catholics and after the fighting, Constans practiced force and oppression against the Donatists through his commissar Macarius. The result of the Macarian campaign (346–348) was the renewal of sectarian strife, the creation of a new crop of martyrs, and the composition of new Donatist martyr stories.

== Martyrdom of Donatus of Bagai (347) and aftermath ==
According to the Donatist tradition, Donatus of Bagai was thrown into a well, while Marculus was executed by being thrown off of a cliff. The former could have been the subject of a reference in the Donatist text "Passio Ss. Martyrum Maximiani et Isaac":

"It excited no venerable ears or hearts. Only the consolation of rumor about your uncounted martyrs of Numidia encouraged the souls of our brothers and sisters"

Marculus then went to become one of the great heroes of the dissenting party, venerated in the Donatist text Passio benedicti martyris Marculi. Bagai experienced continuous persecution under the Romans until a counter-movement, initiated in 390 by the strong bishop, Optatus of thamugadi, led to it regaining its status as a holy city within a short window of 10 years. He used troops not only against the inner dissenting group of Donatists but also against the Catholics. During that time Petilian was made bishop of Cirta; He stated that there could be no alliance with the “Party of Macarius” as Petilian darkly intoned, “for God does not have butchers as his priests". The martyr acts are more severe: there, traditores are called “ministers of Antichrist".

"Whom do you teach, traditor?" the Donatist bishop Petilian taunted: “Him whom you condemn? Whom do you teach, traditor? Him whom you kill?” They were “Macarians,” descendants of that dread arbiter who had slaughtered bishop Donatus of Bagai in his own see and had hurled bishop Marculus over a Numidian precipice – As Petilian stated

In the "Contra litteras Petiliani" Augustine of Hippo disputed some accusations made by Petilian. The Donatist movement persisted beyond 411-420, with Donatus of Bagai's legacy enduring. However, the theological disputes ceased to be vital for North Africans after 450, overshadowed by more pressing concerns, such as the Vandal occupation in the 420s.

== Later opinion by Augustine of Hippo ==
In response to Petilian's accusations regarding the actions of Macarius, Augustine of Hippo addressed the issue in his letters. Augustine, while not explicitly disowning Macarius, adopted a pragmatic stance by asserting that Macarius's character, whether virtuous or wicked, was irrelevant to the matter at hand and did not impact their case. In his earliest anti-Donatist text, "Psalmus Contra Partem Donati," Augustine challenged the exaggeration of Macarius's influence by his opponents, suggesting that the accusations against Macarius were used as a diversion. Augustine acknowledged the presence of flaws within their communion but maintained that Macarius, even if imperfect, adhered to the Christian law by fighting for unity. He did not absolve Macarius of fault but argued that the Donatists were, in his view, more egregious transgressors. This nuanced perspective reflects Augustine's emphasis on the pursuit of unity within the Christian community, even when faced with the imperfections of individuals involved in the controversy.
