= M'Sara =

- Commune and town
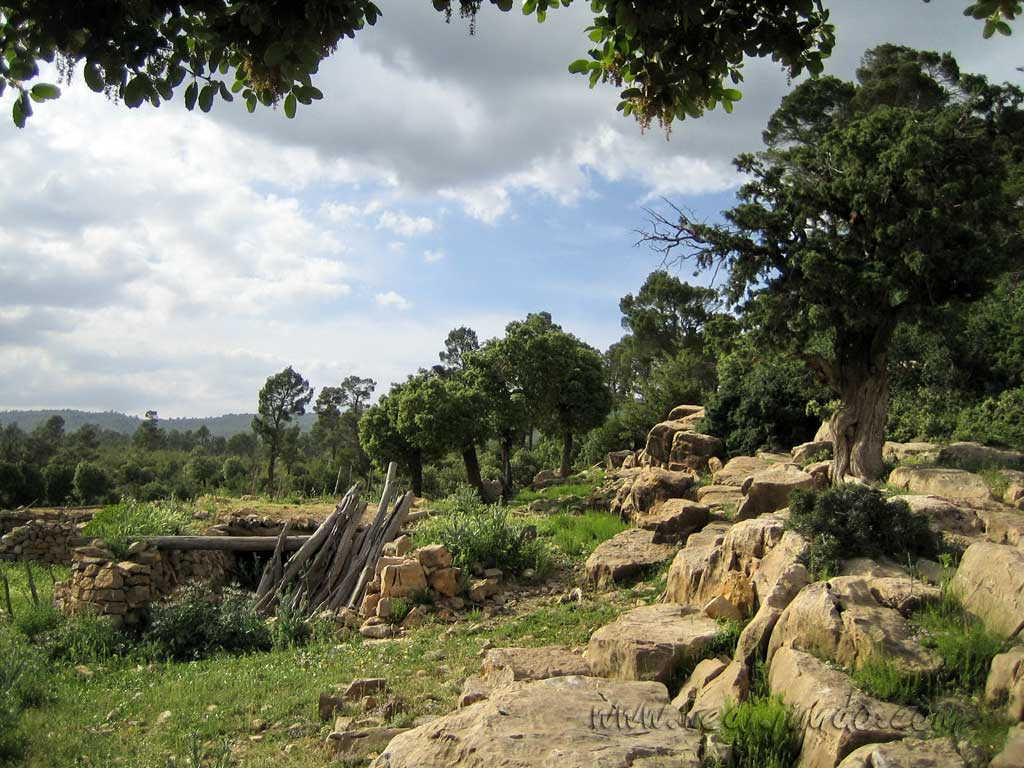

- Algeria
- Country: Algeria
- Province: Khenchela Province

Population (1998)
  - Total: 4,194
- Time zone: UTC+1 (CET)

M'Sara is a town and commune in Khenchela Province, Algeria. According to the 1998 census, it has a population of 4,194.
