= Ouled Rechache =

Coordinates: 35°17′53″N 7°21′11″E

- Commune and town
- Country: Algeria
- Province: Khenchela Province

Population (1998)
  - Total: 22,509
- Time zone: UTC+1 (CET)

Ouled Rechache is a town and commune in Khenchela Province, Algeria. According to the 1998 census it has a population of 22,509.
