= El Mahmal =

- Commune and town
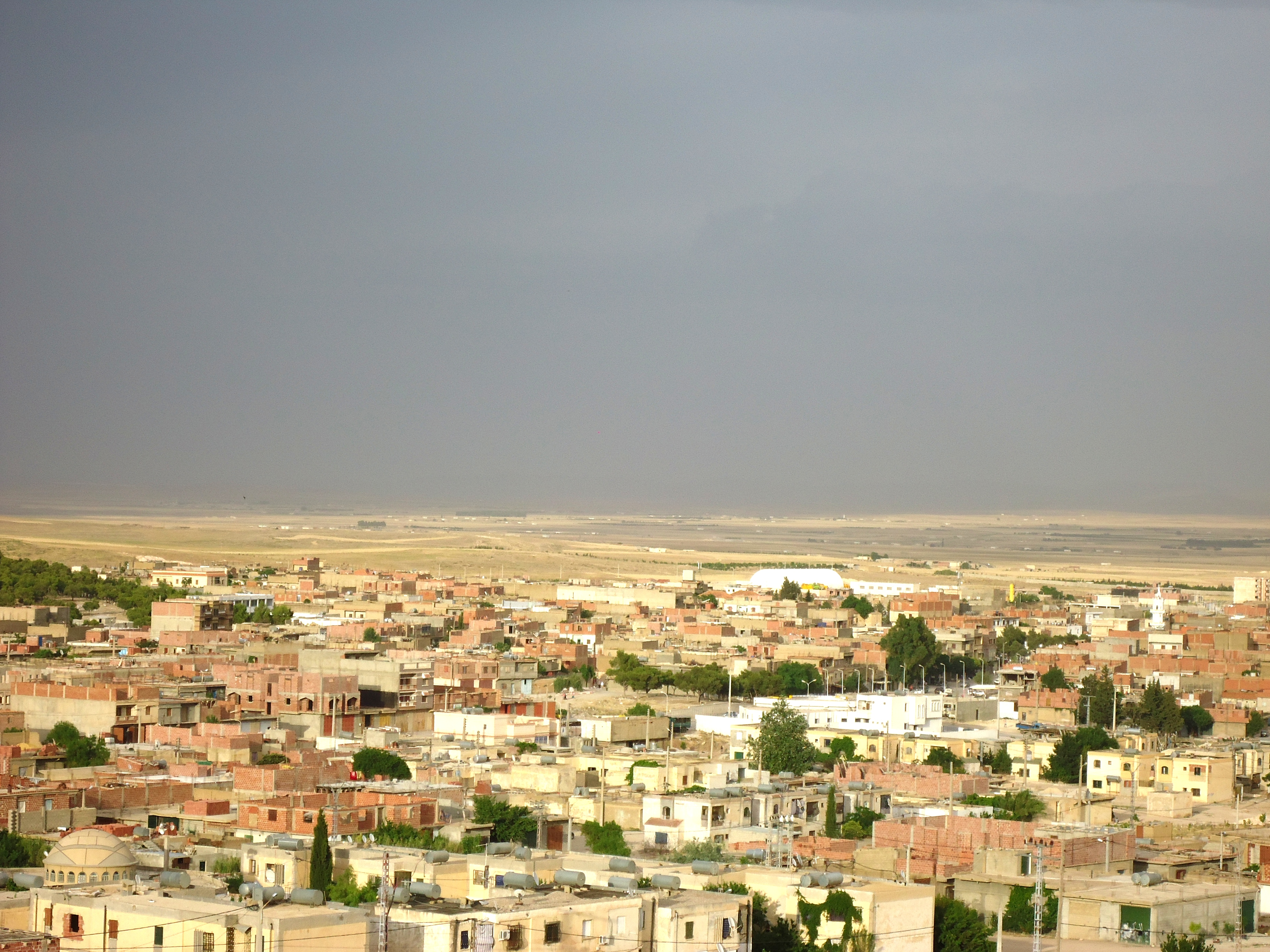

- Location within Algeria
- Coordinates: 35.37381°N 7.21319°E
- Country: Algeria
- Province: Khenchela Province

Population (2008)
  - Total: 28,195
- Time zone: UTC+1 (CET)

El Mahmal is a town and commune in Khenchela Province, Algeria. According to the 2008 census it has a population of 30,484.
