= Djellal =

Coordinates: 34°55′N 6°54′E

- Commune and town
- Country: Algeria
- Province: Khenchela Province

Population (1998)
  - Total: 3,637
- Time zone: UTC+1 (CET)

Djellal is a town and commune in Khenchela Province, Algeria. According to the 1998 census it had a population of 3,637.
