= Macarius (imperial legate) =

Marcarius was an imperial notary sent in 340 to enforce an imperial edict against the Donatist community, in Bagai, Numidia, Roman North Africa.

== Macarius' mission ==
His original mission had been to distribute donations from the emperor Constans, in North African churches in an attempt to end the split between Donatists and Catholics. The local Donatists, however, resisted the legates and aided by Circumcellion groups from the surrounding district, a revolt took place. Rumor spread he had placed imperial images on the Eucharist table and the cry of the rebels was "What has the emperor to do with the church"

Optatus records that the Donatists struck first and the retaliation by the soldiers resulted in a slaughter, of the local church groups. A meeting with the Donatists was called, but the legates had the bishops chained and flogged, and some days later the bishops were killed, Donatus of Bagai thrown down a well and Marculus off a cliff. There is some suggestion that this was carried out by the soldier without Macarius orders but either way, Marcarius set camp at a nearby imperial estate and suppressed the revolt over the following months. In this "Macarius did not discriminate between moderate Donatist and extreme Circumcellionist."

Following the events at Bagai the rift between Catholic and Donatist became intractable. and never forgotten. The Donatists never trusted the Catholic factions again and the dispute became ever more violent over the coming decades.

Donatus of Bagai was held by the Donatists to be a Martyr and a shrine to him and others killed at this time has been recently excavated in Bagai.

== Legacy ==
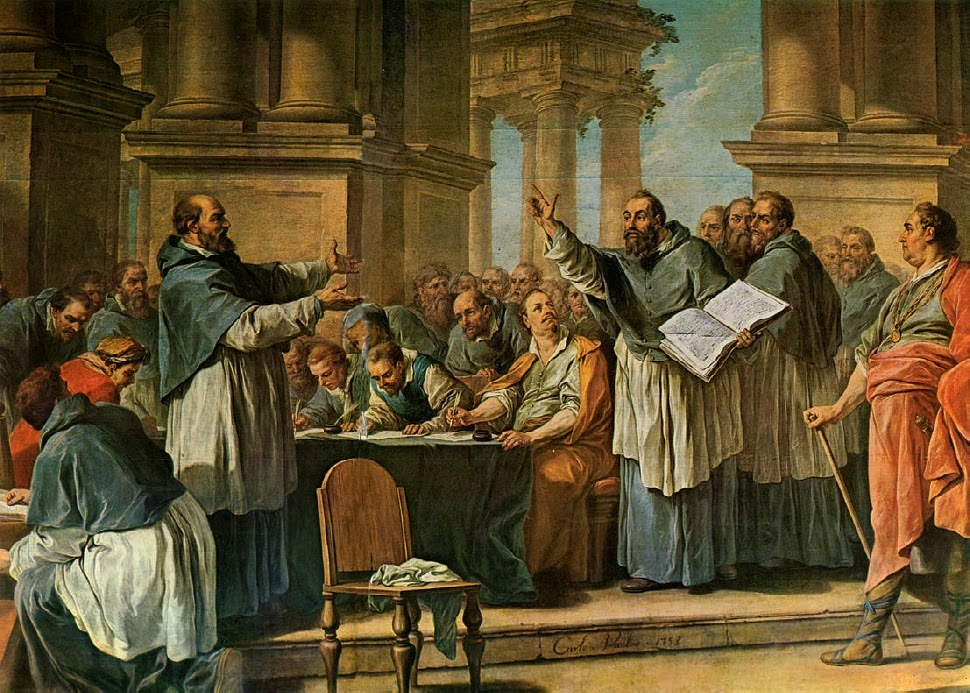
St. Augustine arguing with Donatists

The phrase Macarian Times became a sound bite to express the idea of Catholic-imperial persecution by Donatists preachers."Far from securing unity, the Marcarian mission had left a bitterly divided memory half a century later.

Augustine later accepted that Macarius had acted excessively, while Optatus chilled those who fled from the approach of Macarius.
