= Taouzient =

Coordinates: 35°30′40″N 6°48′30″E

Fais, Khenchela
- Commune and town
- Country: Algeria
- Province: Khenchela Province
- Time zone: UTC+1 (CET)
- Climate: BSk

Taouzient is a town and commune in Khenchela Province, Algeria.
