= David de la Torre Altamirano =

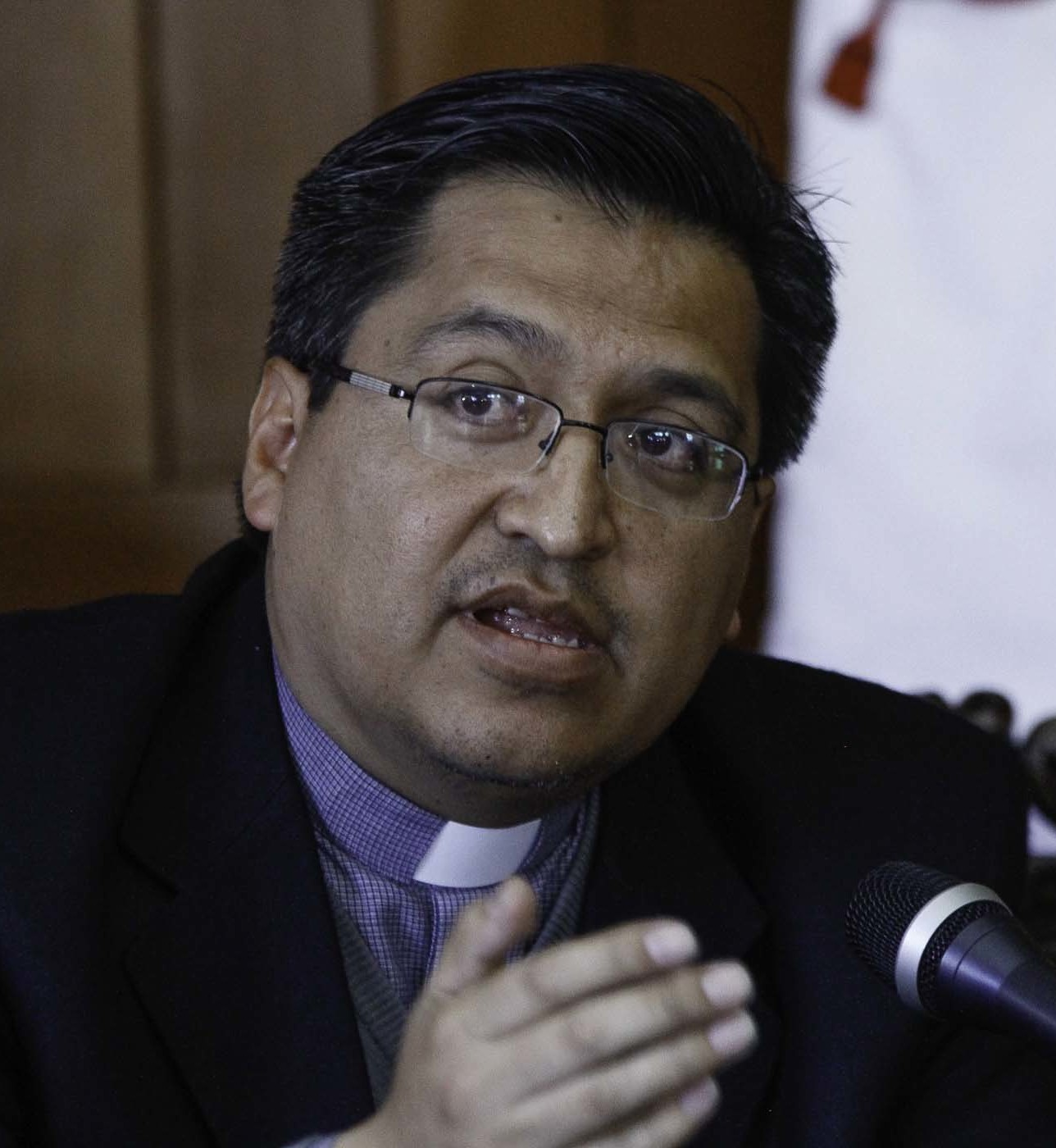
Authorities from the Ecuadorian Episcopal Conference held a press conference to announce the latest details for Pope Francis' visit to the Ecuadorian cities of Quito and Guayaquil on July 6. Pictured here is Monsignor David de la Torre, spokesperson for the Episcopal Conference.

David Israel de la Torre Altamirano SS.CC (Born November 8, 1972) is an Ecuadorian Catholic ecclesiastic, professor, philosopher and theologian, auxiliary bishop of Quito and general secretary of the CEE (Conferencia Episcopal Ecuatoriana).

== Biography ==
David Israel was born on November 8, 1972, in the Ecuadorian city of Quito.

He completed his primary education at the Escuela Particular Asociación Cristiana de Jóvenes, and his secondary education at the Colegio Fiscal Juan Pío Montufar.

He studied Philosophy (1990-1993) at the Pontifical Catholic University of Ecuador (PUCE).

== Religious life ==
In 1990, he entered the postulancy of the Fathers of the Sacred Hearts, in Quito. In 1994, he was admitted to the novitiate of the Congregation of the Sacred Hearts, in Chile.

On March 27, 1995, he made his temporary religious profession. He made his solemn profession on March 27, 1999, both in Quito. He was ordained a priest on August 3, 2001, at the Sacred Hearts Church in San Carlos, Quito, by Cardinal-Archbishop Antonio González Zumárraga.

As a priest, he served in the following capacities:

- Director of his congregation's University Pastoral Center in Quito (2003-2009).
- Professor (2003-2019) and director (2008-2019) of the School of Theology at PUCE.
- Vice-provincial superior of the French Fathers, in Ecuador (2007-2017).
- Coordinator of initial formation in Latin America and member of the International Commission for Initial Formation of his congregation (2008-2017).
- Parish priest of the Sacred Hearts of San Carlos de Quito (2008-2019).

== Episcopate ==
On October 18, 2019, Pope Francis appointed him titular bishop of Bagai and auxiliary bishop of Quito. He was consecrated on December 7 of the same year, in the Church of Our Lady of Sorrows, by Archbishop Alfredo Espinoza Mateus, SDB.

He has also been Secretary General of the Ecuadorian Episcopal Conference, since November 11, 2020. He was appointed Synod Father of the XVI General Assembly of the Synod of Bishops on Synodality, representing the Ecuadorian Episcopal Conference (Rome 2023-2024).
