= Remila =

- Commune and town
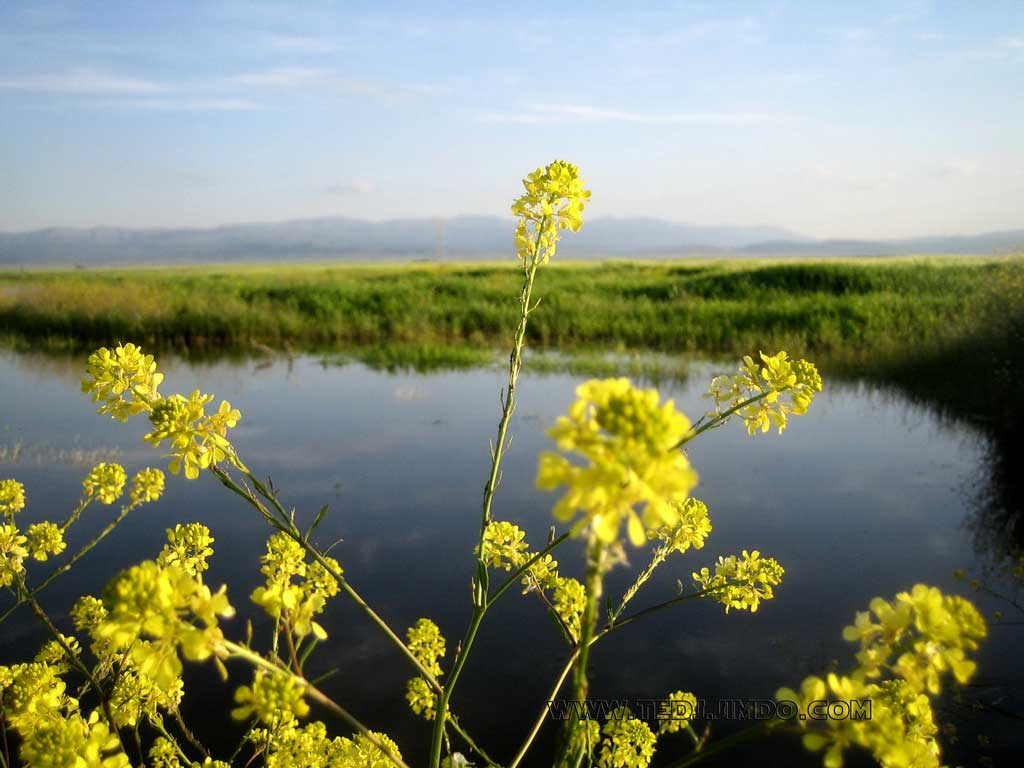

- Location within Algeria
- Coordinates: 35°34′10″N 6°54′00″E
- Country: Algeria
- Province: Khenchela Province

Population (1998)
  - Total: 5,740
- Time zone: UTC+1 (CET)
- Climate: BSk

Remila is a town and commune in Khenchela Province, Algeria. According to the 1998 census it has a population of 5,740.
