= Maximian of Bagai =

- Born: 4th Century
- Died: 5th Century
- Venerated in: Eastern Orthodox Church; Roman Catholic Church
- Feast: October 3
- Controversy: Donatist controversy

Maximian of Bagai was a 5th century bishop of Bagai in Roman North Africa. His life shows the extent that the religious schism in Roman North Africa could become violent.

== Biography ==
About 401AD Maximian converted from Donatism to Catholicism. His Bishopric had long been a center of Donatism and Maximian was almost killed by his former colleagues on two occasions. Such that Augustine once said of him He has more scars than limbs.

He was first attacked in his cathedral, by a Donatist mob who used clubs and swords, where he was rescued by Catholic supporters after sustaining serious wounds.

A second time he was attacked by a circumcellion mob in a similar way. He had used the civil courts to secure possession of a disputed chapel, but as he was taking possession he was attacked and dragged to the top of a tower from which he was thrown. As fate would have it his fall was broken when he landed in a pile of manure. He was found injured by a sympathetic couple and hidden.

In 404 he appealed to the Roman Emperor Honorius regarding these abuses. The emperor reinstated laws against the Donatists as a result.

Augustine in a letter of 402 states that Maximian had abdicated possibly under duress. and Augustine encouraged Maximian's brother Castorius to replace him.

He is venerated by the Catholic Church as a saint. His feast-day is October 3 according to the Roman Martyrologium.
