= Chechar =

- Commune and town
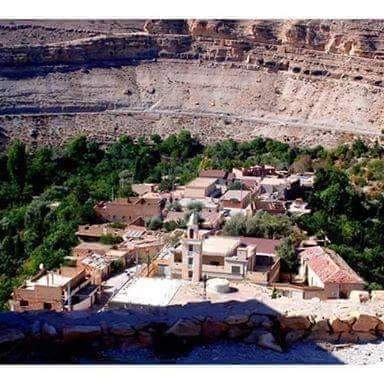

- Location within Algeria
- Country: Algeria
- Province: Khenchela Province

Population (2008)
  - Total: 27,428
- Time zone: UTC+1 (CET)

Chechar is a town and commune in Khenchela Province, Algeria. According to the 2008 census it has a population of 27,428.
