= Vegesela in Numidia =

Former Roman city and modern titular see in North Africa

Vegesela (in Numidia) was an ancient city and former episcopal see in Roman North Africa and remains a Latin Church titular see of the Catholic Church.

Its present location, in Algeria, may be Ksar-Bou-Saïd, Ksar-El-Kelb or Henchir-El-Abiodh.

== History ==
It was among the many cities of sufficient importance in the Roman province of Numidia to become a suffragan diocese under the Pope of Rome, but faded, presumably at the seventh century advent of Islam.

Four of it bishops are historically documented :

- According to Church father Augustine of Hippo, the Council of Carthage of 401 deposed the unnamed bishop of Vegesela di Numidia, but that is dubious, possibly happened much earlier, as in 397 the see was occupied by Reginus, who attended the Council of Carthage of 411, among the Catholic bishops, like his schismatic heretic Donatist counterpart Gavinus.
- Donatianus, participant of the Council of Carthage of 484, called by king Huneric of the Vandal Kingdom, after which he was exiled like most Catholic bishops
- Gennarus, who attended the Council of Carthage of 525.

== Titular see ==
The diocese was nominally restored in 1933 as Latin Church titular see of Vegesela in Numidia (Latin = Curiate Italian) / Vegeselitan(us) in Numidia (Latin adjective)

It has had the following incumbents:

- Idílio José Soares (1966.11.21 – death 1969.12.10) as emeritate; previously Bishop of Petrolina (Brazil) (1932.09.16 – 1943.06.12), Bishop of Santos (Brazil) (1943.06.12 – 1966.11.21)
- Eduardo Larraín Cordovez (1970.02.02 – death 1970.10.20) as emeritate; previously Bishop of Rancagua (Chile) (1938.07.09 – 1970.02.02)
- Fernando Ramon Prego Casal (1970.11.13 – 1971.07.24) as Auxiliary Bishop of Cienfuegos–Santa Clara (Cuba) (1970.11.13 – 1971.07.24); next succeeded as Bishop of Cienfuegos–Santa Clara (1971.07.24 – 1995.04.01), Bishop of daughter see Santa Clara (Cuba) (1995.04.01 – death 1999.01.09)
- Moacyr Grechi, Servites (O.S.M.) (later Archbishop) (1973.07.20 – 1978.05.26) as Bishop-Prelate of Territorial Prelature of Acre e Purus (Brazil) (1972.07.10 – 1986.02.15); later Bishop of Rio Branco (Brazil) (1986.02.15 – 1998.07.29), Metropolitan Archbishop of Porto Velho (Brazil) (1998.07.29 – retired 2011.11.30)
- Severo Aparicio Quispe, Mercederians (O. de M.) (1978.12.11 – death 2013.05.06) as Auxiliary Bishop of Archdiocese of Cusco (Peru) (1978.12.11 – retired 1999.04.10) and as emeritate
- Bishop-elect Juarez Delorto Secco (2017.06.07 – ...), Auxiliary Bishop of Archdiocese of (São Sebastião do) Rio de Janeiro (Brazil) (2017.06.07 – ...).

== See also ==
- List of Catholic dioceses in Algeria
- Vegesela in Byzacena, fellow former bishopric and Latin titular see in neighboring province

== Sources and external links ==
- GCatholic

Bibliography

- Pius Bonifacius Gams, Series episcoporum Ecclesiae Catholicae, Leipzig 1931, p. 469
- Stefano Antonio Morcelli, Africa christiana, Volume I, Brescia 1816, pp. 349–350
- J. Mesnage, L'Afrique chrétienne, Paris 1912, p. 240
- H. Jaubert, Anciens évêchés et ruines chrétiennes de la Numidie et de la Sitifienne, in Recueil des Notices et Mémoires de la Société archéologique de Constantine, vol. 46, 1913, pp. 99–100
