= Ensigha =

- Commune and town

- Location of Ensigha within Algeria
- Coordinates: 35°23′50″N 7°08′35″E
- Country: Algeria
- Province: Khenchela Province

Population (1998)
  - Total: 7,894
- Time zone: UTC+1 (CET)

Ensigha is a town and commune in Khenchela Province, Algeria. According to the 1998 census it has a population of 7,894.
