= El Oueldja =

El Oueldja الولجة
- Commune and town
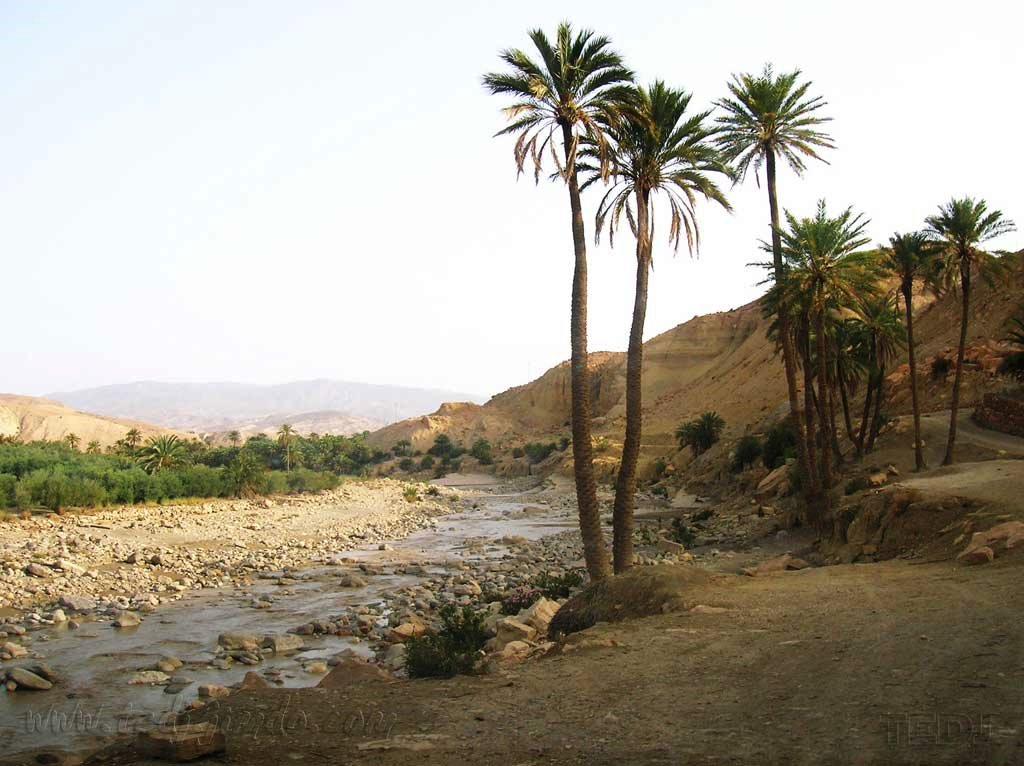
- The oasis at El Oueldja

- Location within Algeria
- Coordinates: 34°54′57″N 6°40′50″E
- Country: Algeria
- Province: Khenchela Province

Area
  - Total: 141 sq mi (366 km^{2})

Population (1998)
  - Total: 3,357
  - Density: 22/sq mi (8.5/km^{2})
- Time zone: UTC+1 (CET)

El Oueldja is a town and commune in Khenchela Province, Algeria. According to the 1998 census it has a population of 3,357.
