= M'Toussa =

- Commune and town

- Location within Algeria
- Coordinates: 35.5993919°N 7.2449684°E
- Country: Algeria
- Province: Khenchela Province

Population (1998)
  - Total: 5,538
- Time zone: UTC+1 (CET)

M'Toussa is a town and commune in Khenchela Province, Algeria. According to the 1998 census it has a population of 5,538.
