= Aïn Touila =

- Commune and town

- Location within Algeria
- Coordinates: 35.443611°N 7.466667°E
- Country: Algeria
- Province: Khenchela Province

Population (1998)
  - Total: 14,769
- Time zone: UTC+1 (CET)

Aïn Touila is a town and commune in Khenchela Province, Algeria. According to the 1998 census it has a population of 14,769.
