= Tamza =

Coordinates: 35°19′N 6°50′E

- Commune and town
- Country: Algeria
- Province: Khenchela Province

Population (1998)
  - Total: 8,580
- Time zone: UTC+1 (CET)

Tamza is a town and commune in Khenchela Province, Algeria. According to the 1998 census it has a population of 8,580.
