= Muhammad Nawaz Khan (writer) =

Pakistani writer

Major Muhammad Nawaz Khan
- محمد نواز خان

Personal details
- Born: 23 November 1943 Shahbaz Garhi, Khyber Pakhtunkhwa, Pakistan
- Died: 3 October 2015 (aged 71) Risalpur, Khyber Pakhtunkhwa, Pakistan
- Children: 3 daughters, 2 sons
- Education: University of Agriculture, Peshawar; Pakistan Military Academy Command and Staff College, Quetta; College of Electrical and Mechanical Engineering
- Occupation: Writer, historian, poet

Military service
- Allegiance: Pakistan
- Branch/service: Pakistan Army
- Years of service: 1966–1991
- Rank: Major
- Unit: 5th FF Regiment

Major (Retd.) Muhammad Nawaz Khan (Urdu: محمد نواز خان, pronounced /moʊˈhɑːməd ˈnɑːwɑːz ˈkɑːn, ˈnæ-/; 23 November 1943 – 3 October 2015), was a Pakistani writer, historian, columnist, and poet of the English, Pashto and Urdu languages. His work had mostly been focused on history of the Pashtuns, the Gandhara civilization and the British legacy in Pakistan (specifically, the North Western Region).

== Military career ==
Muhammad Nawaz joined the Pakistan Military Academy as a cadet in the 2nd War Course, right after the Indo-Pakistani War of 1965. He graduated from the academy after a year and joined the 5th FF Regiment as a Second Lieutenant. Nawaz served in the Pakistan Army for twenty five years, from 1966 till 1991. He retired as a Major. During his service with Pakistan Army, he served as 2IC (Second in Command) of his unit. Nawaz also joined the Command and Staff College, Quetta, graduating in 1977. He served as the Wing Commander at Balahisar Fort in Peshawar, Pakistan, the Headquarters of Frontier Corps. During this time, he was also the official historian of Frontier Corps. Nawaz also wrote little bits of history about the Balahisar Fort, which have been placed on twelve plaques at different locations in the Fort. The plaques give visitors a brief history as well as provide interesting trivia about early life in and around the Fort.

== Writing career ==
Nawaz was also a student editor of Pashto section of Khirman, the journal of the College of Agriculture, Peshawar University. He was also a member of National Heritage Foundation and member executive committees of the Kalash Environment Protection Society, Pakistan Heritage Society and Irfan Society. He was also a member of the NWFP government's Roundtable on Cultural Heritage and Sustainable Tourism Development and member of NWFP government's Experts Committee for assisting and advising Departments of Archaeology and Culture regarding protection, preservation and development of cultural, archaeological and architectural heritage of the province. He was also a member of the Task Force on Tourism of the NWFP government.

He participated in many seminars, workshops, conventions, conferences and meetings about cultural heritage and tourism. He also managed Gandhara Markaz, which publishes books/brochures. He started work on the Major Nawaz Research Trust from 20 December 2003, for the help of researchers and scholars.

Major Nawaz worked on a number of history and tourism projects for the Frontier Corps (KPK), Frontier Constabulary, Pakistan Army, Pakistan Air Force, Frontier Corps Foundation, Pakistan Television Corporation, Pearl Continental Hotel, Peshawar and Sarhad Tourism Corporation.

=== The Gandhara Times ===
From 1992 to 1996, Major Nawaz, as the proprietor and editor, launched the Gandhara Times, a fortnightly newspaper focusing primarily on the preservation of cultural heritage and promotion of tourism in Pakistan. All copies of the newspaper have been preserved for reference purposes.

== Death ==
Nawaz had been suffering from Parkinson's disease since the mid-1990s. His health deteriorated significantly though, after he fell down and suffered from a broken elbow, in May 2014. The long drawn out fight with Parkinson's disease had made him weak and this injury proved to be a very serious challenge. Nawaz was bedridden for over a year due to weakness. Finally, after fighting Parkinson's Disease for almost 20 years, Nawaz died in Risalpur, Khyber Pakhtunkhwa, Pakistan on 3 October 2015.

== Publications ==
- Goluna au Azghi (ګُلُونا او ازغۍ) (Pashto Poetry) 1965
- Khush Qismata Gadba (خوش قسمَتَ ګډبه) (Pashto Folk Poetry) 1968
- Shum (شُوم) (Pashto Novel) 1968
- Ishq-e-Rasul (عِشقِ رسوُل ) (Pashto Naat), 1968
- History of the 5th Battalion the Frontier Force Regiment 1969
- Hasad Ki Aag (حَسَد کۍ آگ) (Urdu Novelette) 1969
- Tarikh-e-Shahbaz Garhi (تاريخِ شهباز گڑھی) (Urdu) 1910
- The Bala Hisar Fort Peshawar 1987
- The Frontier Constabulary (Major Write Up) 1993
- The Guardians of the Frontier (The Frontier Crops NWFP) 1994
- Malakand A Journey through History. 1995
- Kund National Park (Tourist Guide) 1996
- Malakand, Dir, Swat & Chitral (Tourist Guide) 1996
- The Glorious Piffers 1996
- Hazara (Tourist Guide) 1996
- Shuhada-e-Tirwanja (شُهَدَاعِ تِروَنجا) (Urdu) 1997
- The Valiant Scouts (Frontier Corps NWFP) 1997
- Ali Mardan Khan's Garden Villa and The Flag Staff House in Peshawar Cantonment
- The Historic Khyber Pass (Tourist. Guide) 1999
- Chakdara. (Tourist Guide). 1999
- The Historic BaIahisar Fort, Peshawar (Tourist Guide) 1999
- De Mataloono Dialai (دَ مَتَلُونو ډالئ) (Pashto) 2001
- Da Nawe Zamane Tapae (دَ نَوی َزمانې ټَپے) (Pashto) 2001
- Peshawar City (Joint Effort) (Tourist Guide) 2001
- Rohtas, The symbol of Sher Shah's Power 2002
- Pakhtun Roots & Pakhtunkhwa: A study in Retrospect 2002
- Peshawar Valley: The Heart of Gandhara (Tourist Guide) 2002
- Southern Areas of NWFP: The Treasure land of Cultural Heritage (Tourist Guide) 2002
- The Tribal Areas (Frontier) Glorious History & Gallant People (Tourist Guide) 2002
- The Malam Jaba Tourist Resort (Tourist Guide) 2002
- The Shandur Pass & Polo (Tourist Guide) 2002
- The Khattaks: A Restless People 2004
- The British and the Pathans 2004
- 48 Years of Literary Madness 2004
- The Khyber: The Treasure Land of History 2004
- Peshawar: The Unwritten History, 2004
- Ancient Names (Regions, Cities, Towns, Rivers, People & Places) 2004
- The Forts of Pakistan (North Western Region) 2005
- Da Mataloono Guldasta (دَ مَتَلُونو ګُلدَسته) (Pashto) 2005
- The British Cemeteries in Pakistan (North Western Region) 2005
- The Gandhara Times, Fortnightly was regularly published from: 1992 to 1996 and all the copies have been preserved for reference.
