= Petilianus =

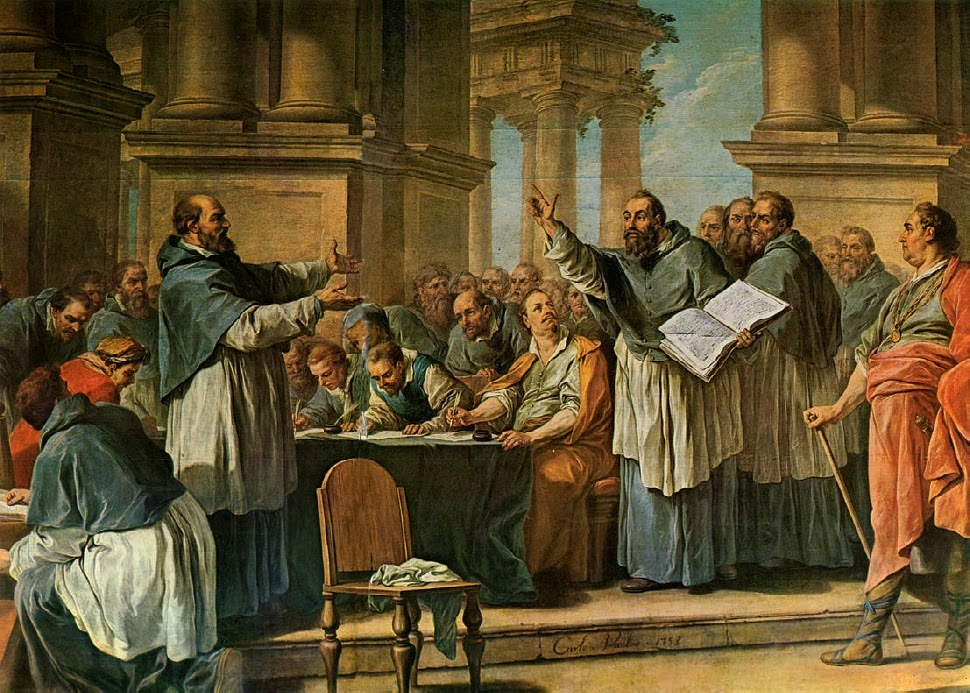
Augustine arguing with Donatists.

Petilianus was an eminent Donatist of the 5th century in Roman North Africa, who is known to history through the letters he wrote to the Catholic Bishop Augustine of Hippo and the discourses in Augustine's replies. Although most of what we know of him comes from Augustine, his main theology seems to have been "that the true church was only composed of those who were repentant."

== Early life ==
Petilianus was from Cirta, the main city of the Roman province of Numidia. His parents were Catholics, but early in life he was taken against his will by the Donatists, baptised and eventually made their bishop around 395 to 400. Before this he had been a lawyer, rising to the rank of paraclete.

== Episcopal career ==
About 398 to 400, Augustine invited leaders of the Donatist sect in Cirta to discuss the questions at issue between them and the Catholic Church. The invitation was rejected.

Petilianus later sent a letter to Augustine, proposing a separation from the Catholic Church, due to what he perceived as "pollution of the souls" through the repetition of baptism. The validity of baptism in his view depended on the character of the baptiser. He also charged the Catholics with persecution and "tradition," (in the sense of traditor, one who had "handed over" Church documents or utensils during times of persecution) and an insinuation about Manicheism. To these charges Augustine replied in his first book against Petilian.

In Augustine's second book, he refutes Petilanus's position on

1. application of Scripture passages;
2. the inefficacy of baptism by ungodly persons;
3. the iniquity of persecution, wherein Augustine denies the charge, and retorts it upon his adversary, whose partisans, the Circumcellions and others, were guilty of persecution;
4. the objection to appeal to the civil power where Augustine shows that the Donatists themselves appealed to Constantine, and took advantage of the patronage of Julian;
5. denying that the language of Scripture and of the church had been perverted.

A second letter from Petilian followed, which is known only from excerpts in Augustine's subsequent reply letter, and a treatise on the Unity of the Church.

In "Contra litteras Petiliani" Augustine disputed some accusations made by Petiliani that Pope Marcellinus and some other Roman priests had been traditors during the Diocletianic Persecution.

As Bishop of Cirta he had a leading role at the Council of Carthage (411), being one of the seven managers on the Donatist side.

At the Council of Carthage 411, Petilian was recorded by Augustine for ingenious quibbling and minute subtlety on technical details of procedure — using, in short, as Augustine said afterwards, every artifice in order to prevent real discussion. He was furthermore accused on the third day of the Council of losing his temper and insulting Augustine personally.

== See also ==
- Petillia gens
