= El Hamma, Khenchela =

Coordinates: 35°27′49″N 7°04′57″E

El Hamma
- Commune and town
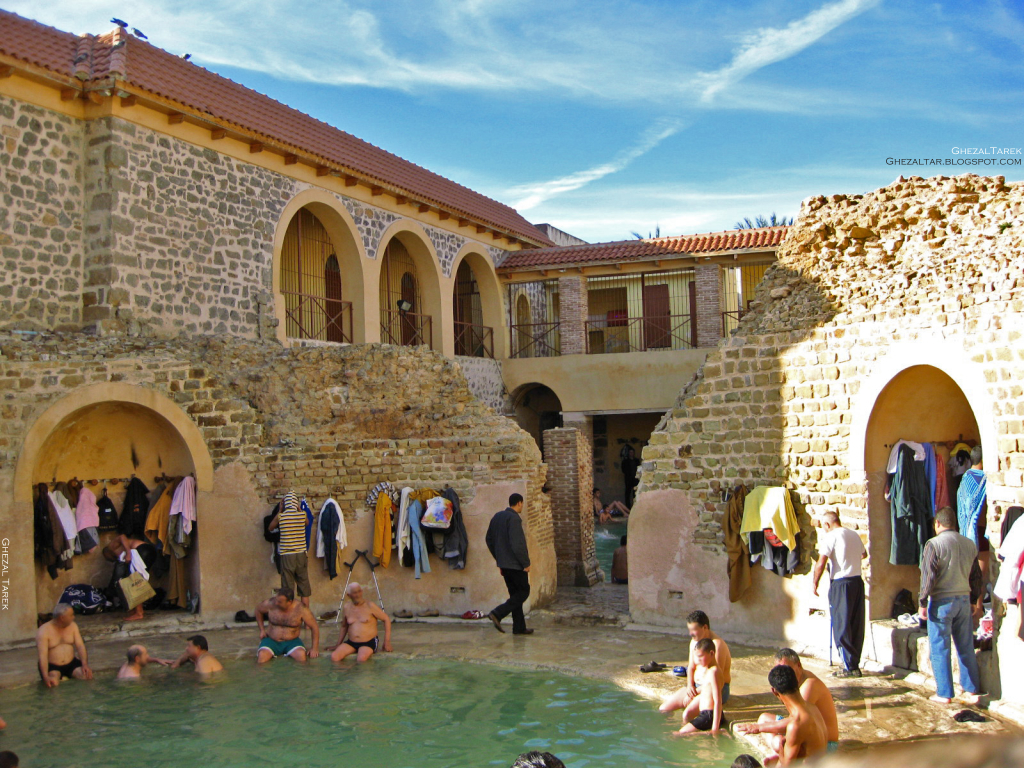

- Country: Algeria
- Province: Khenchela Province

Population (1998)
  - Total: 10,702
- Time zone: UTC+1 (CET)

El Hamma, Khenchela is a town and commune in Khenchela Province, Algeria. According to the 1998 census it had a population of 10,702.
