= Kaïs, Khenchela =

Kaïs
- Commune and town

- Location within Algeria
- Coordinates: 35.4946392°N 6.924305°E
- Country: Algeria
- Province: Khenchela Province

Population (2008)
  - Total: 32,668
- Time zone: UTC+1 (CET)
- Climate: BSk

Kaïs, Khenchela is a town and commune in Khenchela Province, Algeria. According to the 2008 census it has a population of 32,668.
