= Khenchela Province =

Province of Algeria

Khenchela Province ولاية خنشلة
- Province
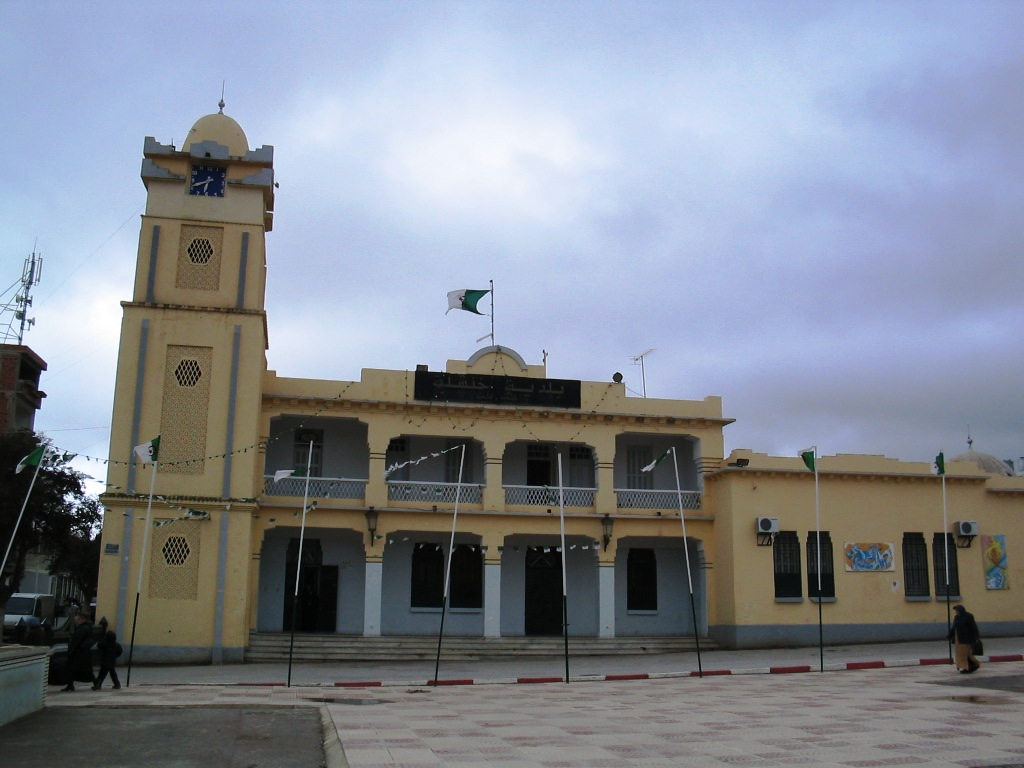
- Nickname: Hansala
- Coordinates: 35.434°N 7.147°E
- Country: Algeria
- Capital: Khenchela

Government
  - Wāli: Salim Harizi

Area
  - Total: 9,715 km^{2} (3,751 sq mi)

Population (2008)
  - Total: 384,268
  - Density: 39.55/km^{2} (102.4/sq mi)
- Time zone: UTC+01 (CET)
- Area Code: +213 (0) 032
- ISO 3166 code: DZ-40
- Districts: 8
- Municipalities: 21

Khenchela Province (Arabic: ولاية خنشلة) is a province (wilaya) in the Aurès region in Algeria.

== History ==
The province was created from parts of Oum el Bouaghi Province and Tébessa Province in 1984.

== Administrative division ==
The province is divided into 8 districts, which are further divided into 21 communes or municipalities.

=== Districts ===
1. Khenchela, as a district and capital Khenchela
2. Aïn Touila, located 20 kilometres (12 mi) northeast of the capital
3. Babar, located 30 kilometres (19 mi) south of the capital
4. Bouhmama, located 35 kilometres (22 mi) west of the capital
5. Chechar, located 50 kilometres (31 mi) south of the capital
6. El Hamma, located 7 kilometres (4.3 mi) west of the capital
7. Kaïs, located 22 kilometres (14 mi) west of the capital
8. Ouled Rechache, located 22 kilometres (14 mi) east of the capital

=== Communes ===
1. Aïn Touila
2. Babar
3. Baghai
4. Bouhmama
5. Chelia
6. Cherchar
7. Djellal
8. El Hamma
9. El Mahmal
10. El Oueldja
11. Ensigha
12. Fais (Taouzianat)
13. Kais
14. Khenchela
15. Khirane
16. M'Sara
17. M'Toussa
18. Ouled Rechache
19. Remila
20. Tamza
21. Yabous
