= Sari Abacha =

Nigerian footballer (1978–2013)

Personal information
- Full name: Sanni Abacha
- Date of birth: 26 October 1978
- Place of birth: Nigeria
- Date of death: 3 October 2013 (aged 34)
- Place of death: Ilorin, Nigeria
- Height: 1.85 m (6 ft 1 in)
- Position: Sweeper

Senior career*
| Years | Team | Apps | (Gls) |
| 1996–1997 | Shooting Stars F.C. | | |
| 1998–2000 | Kwara United F.C. | | |
| 2001 | Enyimba International F.C. | | |
| 2002 | Sharks F.C. | | |
| 2003–2013 | Kwara United F.C. | | |

International career
| 1999 | Nigeria | 2 | (0) |
- * Club domestic league appearances and goals as of 24 September 2007

Sanni Sari Abacha (26 October 1978 – 3 October 2013) was a Nigerian footballer who played as a sweeper. He died in 2013.

== Career ==
He began his career 1996 by Shooting Stars F.C. before moving in January 2001 to Kwara United F.C. After 17 months with Kwara United F.C., he was transferred to Enyimba International F.C. and later moved then to Sharks F.C. in July 2002. In January 2007 he turned back to his former team Kwara United F.C.
