= Christianity in the Roman Africa province =

Historical region of Christianity

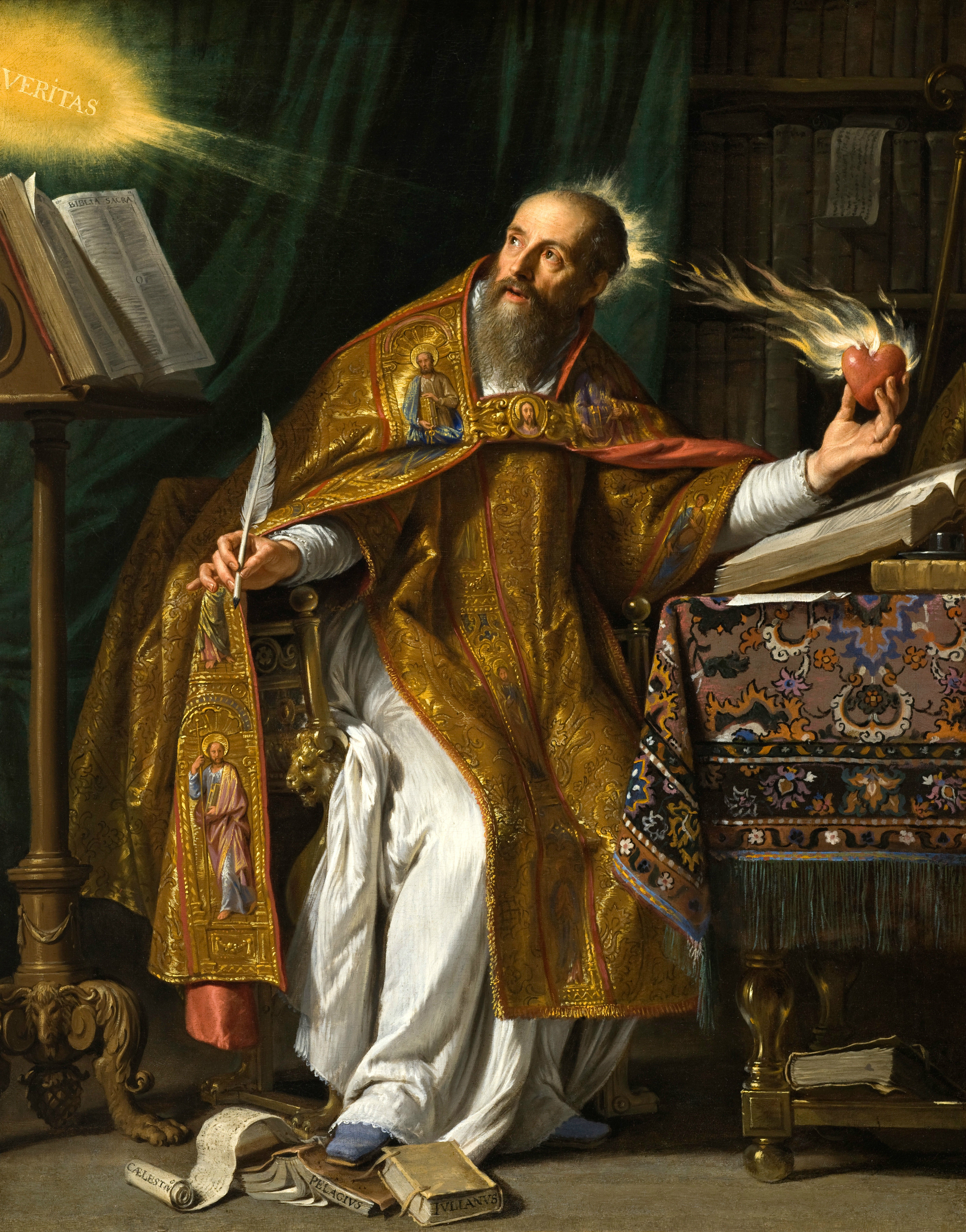
St. Augustine

The name early African church is given to the Christian communities inhabiting the region known politically as Roman Africa, and comprised geographically somewhat around the area of the Roman Diocese of Africa, namely: the Mediterranean littoral between Cyrenaica on the east and the river Ampsaga (now the Oued Rhumel (fr)) on the west; that part of it that faces the Atlantic Ocean being called Mauretania, in addition to Byzacena. Thus corresponding somewhat to contemporary Morocco, Algeria, Tunisia and Libya. The evangelization of Africa followed much the same lines as those traced by Roman civilization. From the late fifth and early sixth century, the region included several Christian Berber kingdoms.

Informal primacy was exercised by the Archdiocese of Carthage, a metropolitan archdiocese also known as "Church of Carthage". The Church of Carthage thus was to the early African church what the Church of Rome was to the Catholic Church in Italy. The archdiocese used the African Rite, a variant of the Western liturgical rites in Latin language, possibly a local use of the primitive Roman Rite.

Famous figures include Saint Perpetua, Saint Felicitas, and their Companions (died c. 203), Tertullian (c. 155–240), Cyprian (c. 200–258), Caecilianus (floruit 311), Saint Aurelius (died 429), and Eugenius of Carthage (died 505). Tertullian and Cyprian are both considered Latin Church Fathers of the Latin Church. Tertullian, a theologian of part Berber descent, was instrumental in the development of trinitarian theology, and was the first to apply Latin language extensively in his theological writings. As such, Tertullian has been called "the father of Latin Christianity" and "the founder of Western theology." Carthage remained an important center of Christianity, hosting several councils of Carthage.

== History ==
=== First centuries ===
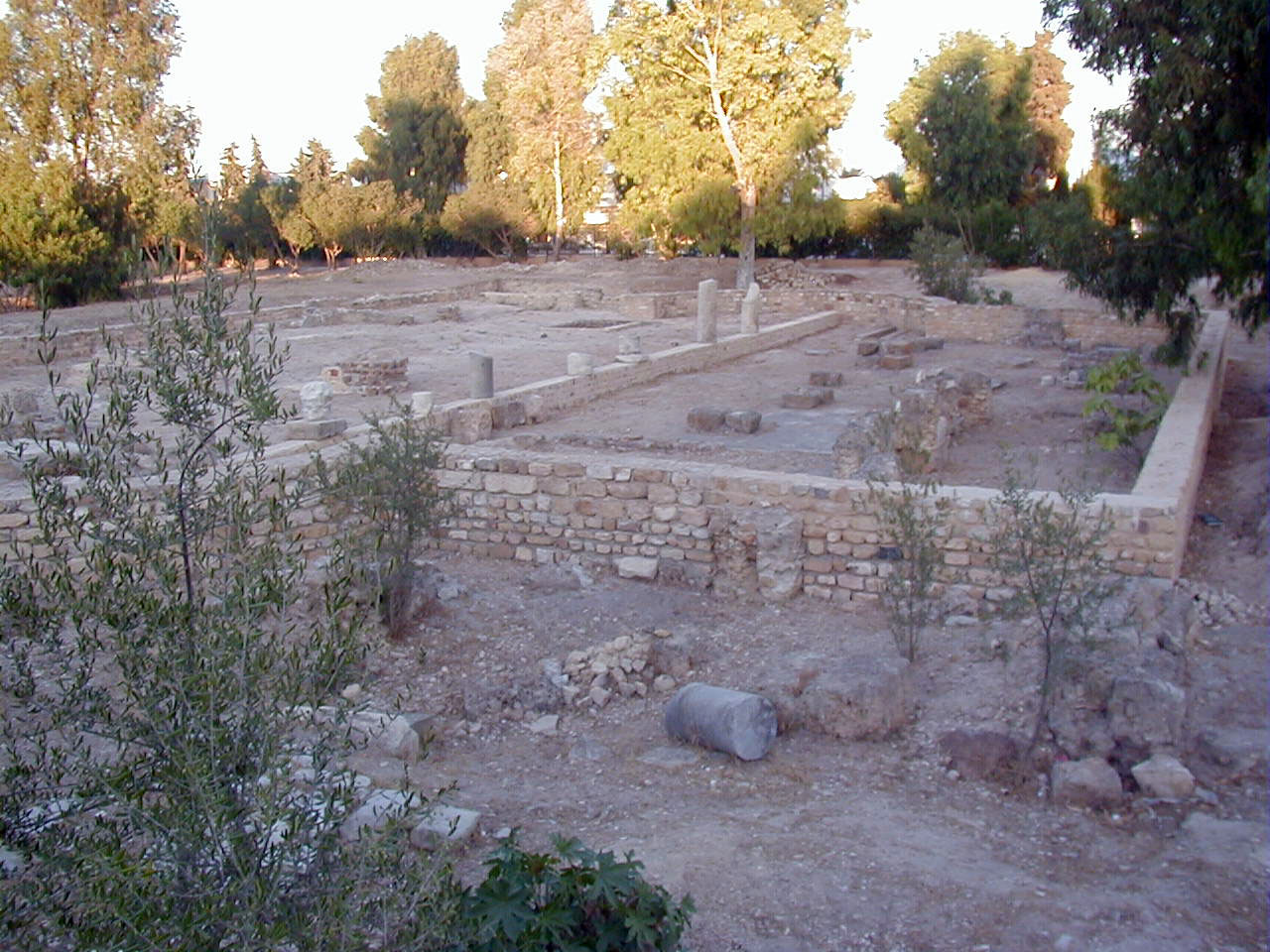
Early Christian quarter in ancient Carthage.

The delimitation of the ecclesiastical boundaries of the African Church is a matter of great difficulty. Again and again the Roman political authority rearranged the provincial divisions, and on various occasions the ecclesiastical authorities conformed the limits of their respective jurisdictions to those of the civil power. These limits, however, were not only liable to successive rectification, but in some cases they were not even clearly marked. Parts of Mauretania always remained independent; the mountainous region to the west of the Aurès Mountains (Middle Atlas), and the plateau above the Tell never became Roman. The high lands of the Sahara and all the country west of the Atlas range were inhabited by the nomad tribes of the Gaetuli, and there are neither churches nor definite ecclesiastical organizations to be found there. Christianity filtered in, so to speak, little by little.

Bishoprics were founded among the converts, as the need for them arose; were moved, possibly, from place to place, and disappeared, without leaving a trace of their existence. The historical period of the African Church begins in 180 with groups of martyrs. At a somewhat later date the writings of Tertullian tell us how rapidly African Christianity had grown. It had passed the Roman military lines, and spread among the peoples to the south and southeast of the Aure. About the year 200 there was a violent persecution at Carthage and in the provinces held by the Romans. We gain information as to its various phases from the martyrdom of St. Perpetua and the treatises of Tertullian. Christianity, however, did not even then cease to make distant conquests; Christian epitaphs are to be found at Sour El-Ghozlane, dated 227, and at Tipasa, dated 238. These dates are assured. If we rely on texts less definite we may admit that the evangelization of Northern Africa began very early.

By the opening of the 3rd century there was a large Christian population in the towns and even in the country districts, which included not only the poor, but also persons of the highest rank. A council held at Carthage about the year 235 was presided over by the earliest known bishop of Carthage, Agrippinus, and was attended by eighteen bishops from the province of Numidia. Another council, held in the time of Cyprian, about the middle of the 3rd century, was attended by eighty-seven bishops. At this period the African Church went through a very grave crisis.

The Emperor Decius published an edict that made many martyrs and confessors, and not a few apostates. A certain bishop, followed by his whole community, was to be seen sacrificing to the gods. The apostates (see Lapsi) and the timid who had bought a certificate of apostasy for money (see Libellatici) became so numerous as to believe they could lay down the law to the Church, and demand their restoration to ecclesiastical communion, a state of affairs that gave rise to controversies and deplorable troubles.

Yet the Church of Africa had martyrs, even at such a time. The persecutions at the end of the third, and the beginning of the fourth, century did not only make martyrs; they also gave rise to a minority that claimed that Christians could deliver the sacred books and the archives of the Church to the officers of the State, without lapsing from the faith. (See Traditors.)

=== After Constantine ===
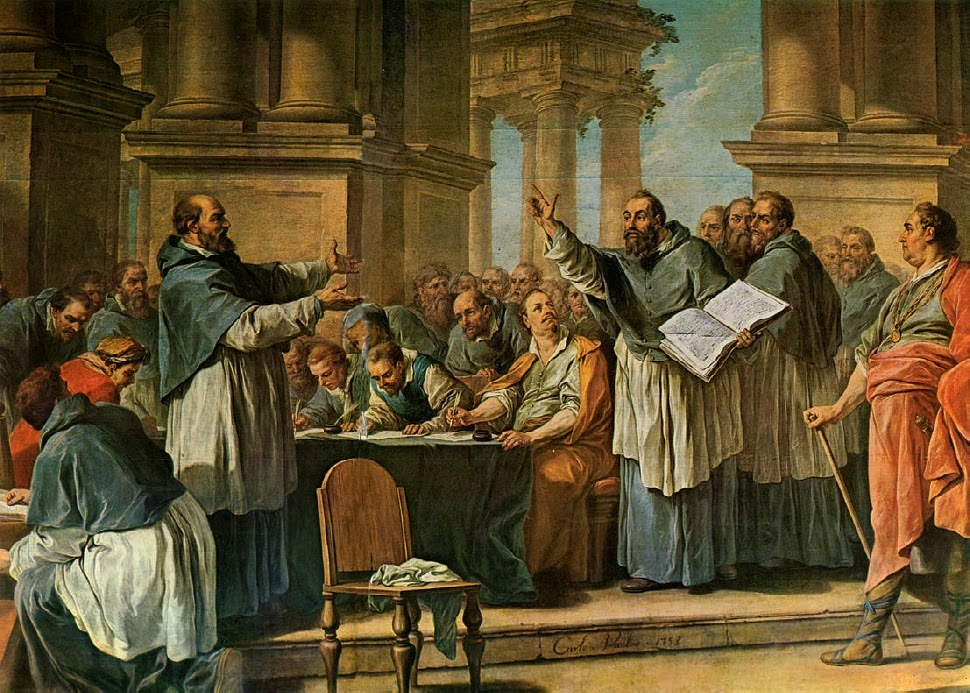
Charles-André van Loo's 18th-century Augustine arguing with Donatists.

The accession of Constantine the Great found the African Church torn apart by controversies and heresies; Catholics and Donatists contended not only in polemics, but also in a violent and bloody way. A law of Constantine (318) deprived the Donatists of their churches, most of which they had taken from the Catholics. They had, however, grown so powerful that even such a measure failed to crush them. They were so numerous that a Donatist Council, held at Carthage, in 327, was attended by 270 bishops. Donatism mainly spread among the indigenous Berber population, and Donatists were able to blend Christianity with many of the Berber local customs. A number of new ceremonies and doctrines were added to Christian practices. Donatist Christianity was source of unity among its member and indigenous Berber nationalism.

Attempts at reconciliation, suggested by the Emperor Constantius II, only widened the breach and led to armed repression, an ever-growing disquiet, and an enmity that became increasingly embittered. Yet, in the very midst of these troubles, the Primate of Carthage, Gratus, declared (in the year 349): "God has restored Africa to religious unity." Julian's accession (361) and his permission to all religious exiles to return to their homes added to the troubles of the African Church. A Donatist bishop sat in the seceded see of Carthage, in opposition to the orthodox bishop.

One act of violence followed another and begat new conflicts. About this period, Optatus, Bishop of Milevum (fr), began to combat the sect by his writings. A few years later, St. Augustine, converted at Milan, returned to his native land, and entered the lists against every kind of error. Paganism had by that time ceased to be a menace to the Church; in 399 the temples were closed at Carthage. Nevertheless, the energy and genius of Augustine were abundantly occupied in training the clergy and instructing the faithful, as well as in theological controversy with the heretics. For forty years, from 390 to 430, the Councils of Carthage, which reunited a great part of the African Episcopate, public discussions with the Donatists, sermons, homilies, scriptural commentaries, followed almost without interval; an unparalleled activity that had commensurate results.

Pelagianism, which had made great strides in Africa, was condemned at the Council of Carthage (412). Donatism, also, and semipelagianism were stricken to death at an hour when political events of the utmost gravity changed the history and the destiny of the African Church. Conflict between Carthage and Rome on the regulation of the African Church came to the fore when Apiarius of Sicca appealed his excommunication to Rome and thus challenged the authority of Carthage. Count Boniface had summoned the Vandals to Africa in 426, and by 429 the invasion was completed. The barbarians advanced rapidly and made themselves masters of cities and provinces. In 430 St. Augustine died, during the siege of Hippo; nine years later Genseric, king of the Vandals, took possession of Carthage. Then began for the African Church an era of persecution of a kind hitherto unknown. The Vandals were Arians, and were bent on establishing Arianism.

Churches the invasion had left standing were either transferred to the Arians or withdrawn from the Catholics and closed to public worship. The intervention of the Emperor Zeno (474–491) and the conclusion of a treaty of peace with Genseric, were followed by a transient calm. The churches were opened, and the Catholics were allowed to choose a bishop (476), but the death of Genseric, and the edict of Huneric, in 484, made matters worse than before. A contemporary writer, Victor of Vita, has told us what we know of this long history of the Vandal persecution. In such a condition of peril, the Christians of Africa did not display much courage in the face of oppression.

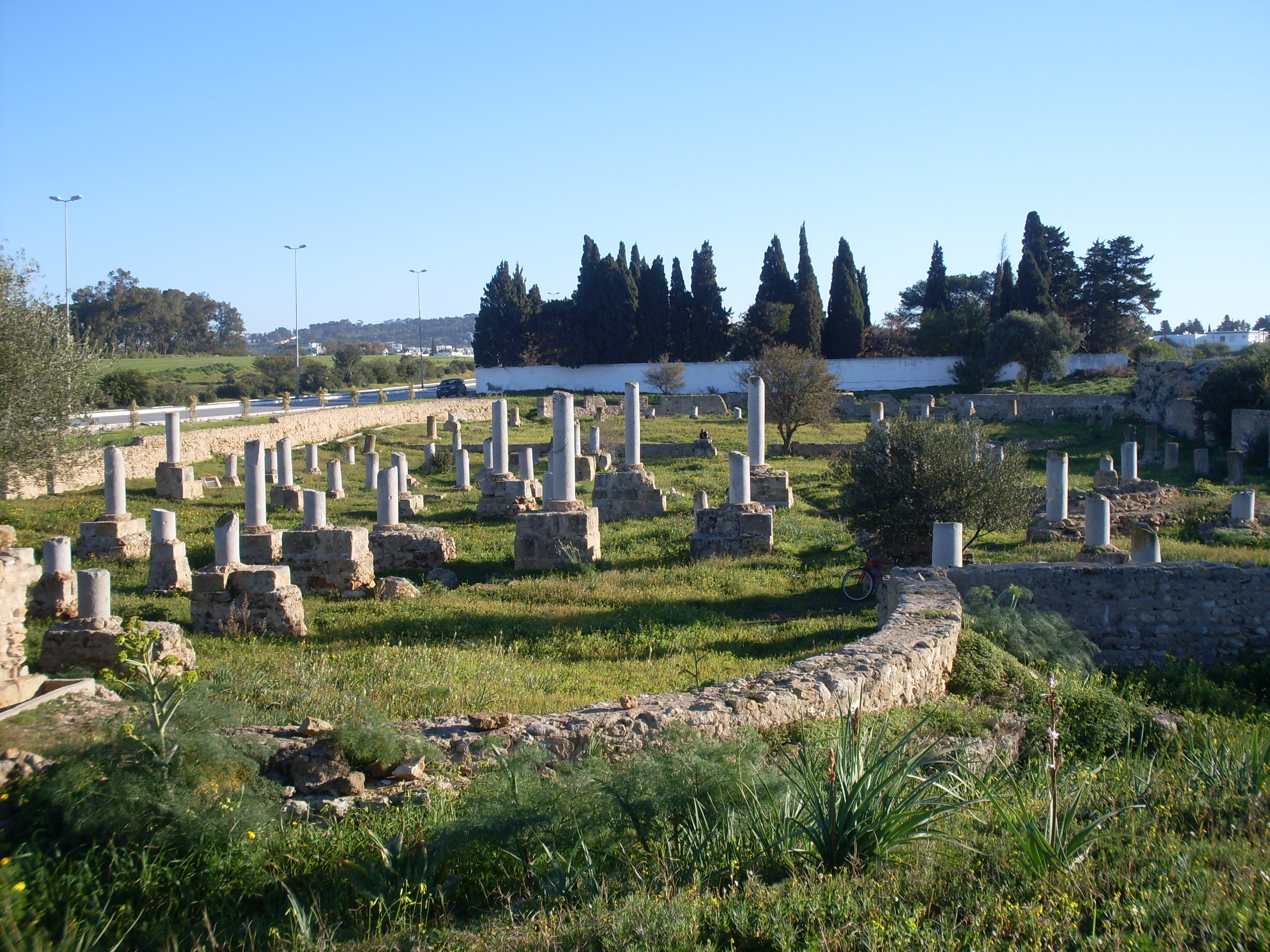
Ruins of Basilica of Damous El Karita west view in Carthage.

During the last years of Vandal rule in Africa, St. Fulgentius, Bishop of Ruspe, exercised a fortunate influence over the princes of the Vandal dynasty, who were no longer completely barbaric, but whose culture, wholly Roman and Byzantine, equalled that of their native subjects. Yet the Vandal monarchy, which had lasted for nearly a century, seemed less firmly established than at its beginning. Hilderic, who succeeded Thrasamund in 523, was too cultured and too mild a prince to impose his will on others. Gelimer made an attempt to deprive him of power, and, proclaimed King of the Vandals in 531, marched on Carthage and dethroned Hilderich. His cause appeared to be completely successful, and his authority firmly established, when a Byzantine fleet appeared off the coast of Africa. The battle of Ad Decimum (13 September 533) won the initiative for the invading Byzantines. The taking of Carthage, the flight of Gelimer, and the battle of Tricamarum, about the middle of December, completed their destruction and their disappearance.

The victor, Belisarius, had but to show himself in order to reconquer the greater part of the coast, and to place the cities under the authority of the Emperor Justinian. A Council held at Carthage in 534 was attended by 220 bishops representing all the churches. It issued a decree forbidding the public exercise of Arian worship. The establishment of Byzantine rule, however, was far from restoring unity to the African Church. The Councils of Carthage brought together the bishops of Proconsular Africa, Byzacena, and Numidia, but those of Tripolitania and Mauretania were absent. Mauretania had, in fact, regained its political autonomy, during the Vandal period. A native dynasty had been set up, and the Byzantine army of occupation never succeeded in conquering a part of the country so far from their base at Carthage.

The reign of Justinian marks a sad period in the history of the African Church, due to the part taken by the clergy in the matter known as the Three-Chapter Controversy. While one part of the episcopate wasted its time and energies in fruitless theological discussions, others failed of their duty. It was under these circumstances that Pope Gregory the Great sent men to Africa, whose lofty character contributed greatly to increase the prestige of the Roman Church. The notary Hilarus became in some sense a papal legate with authority over the African Bishops. He left them in no doubt as to their duty, instructed or reprimanded them, and summoned councils in the Pope's name. With the help of the metropolitan of Carthage, he succeeded in restoring unity, peace, and ecclesiastical discipline in the African Church, which drew strength from so fortunate a change even so surely as the See of Rome regained in respect and authority.

=== The Arab Conquest and decline ===
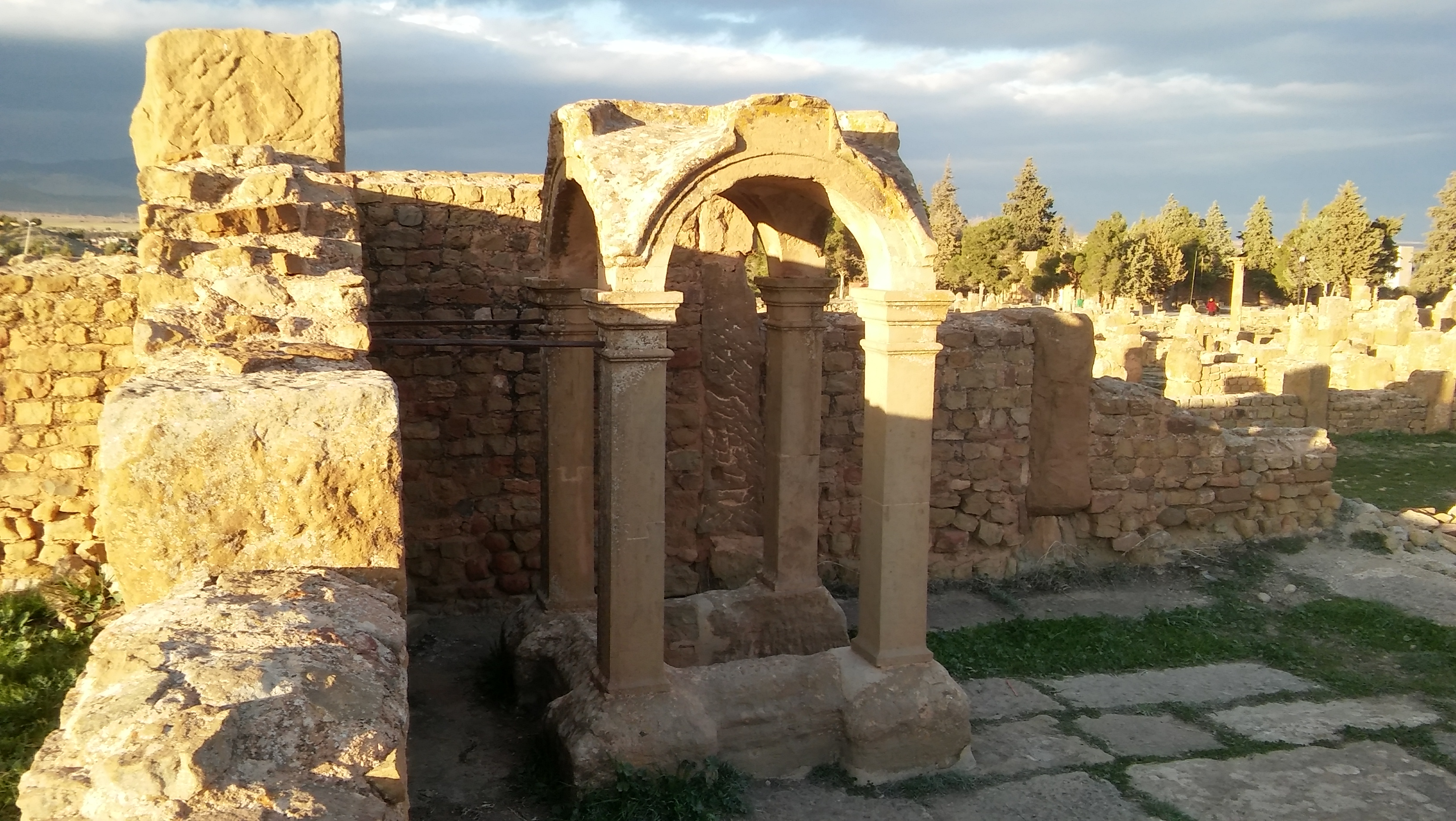
Ruins of Church in Timgad.

The Arabs started conquering the region of North Africa in the 7th century and in 698 Carthage was taken. The Latin-speaking Christian church gradually declined, a process that coincided with the disappearance of African Romance dialects. Older scholarship often viewed the decline as rapid, while more recent research suggests a slower process. Another view however has been that it remained in the region for many centuries before dying out.

Archaeological and scholarly research has shown that Christianity existed after the Muslim conquests. The Catholic church gradually declined along with local Latin dialect. Some historians have argued for a relatively rapid decline, but evidence indicates Christian communities survived for centuries after the conquest of North Africa by the Islamic Umayyad Caliphate between AD 647–709.

Many causes have been seen as leading to the decline of Christianity in Maghreb. The decline is generally attributed to multiple social, political, economic, and religious factors. In addition, many Christians also migrated to Europe. The Church at that time lacked the backbone of a monastic tradition and was still suffering from the aftermath of heresies including the so-called Donatist heresy, and this contributed to the early obliteration of the Church in the present day Maghreb. Some historians contrast this with the strong monastic tradition in Coptic Egypt, which is credited as a factor that allowed the Coptic Church to remain the majority faith in that country until around after the 14th century despite numerous persecutions. In addition, the Romans were unable to completely assimilate the indigenous people like the Berbers.

Some historians remark how the Umayyad Caliphate persecuted many Berber Christians in the 7th and 8th centuries CE, who slowly converted to Islam. Other modern historians further recognize that the Christian populations living in the lands invaded by the Arab Muslim armies between the 7th and 10th centuries CE suffered religious persecution, religious violence, and martyrdom multiple times at the hands of Arab Muslim officials and rulers; many were executed under the Islamic death penalty for defending their Christian faith through dramatic acts of resistance such as refusing to convert to Islam, repudiation of the Islamic religion and subsequent reconversion to Christianity, and blasphemy towards Muslim beliefs. Local Catholicism came under pressure when the Muslim fundamentalist regimes of the Almoravids and especially the Almohads came into power, and the record shows persecutions and demands made that the local Christians of Maghreb were forced to convert to Islam. Reports still exist of Christian inhabitants and a bishop in the city of Kairouan around 1150 – a significant report, since this city was founded by Arab Muslims around 680 as their administrative center after their conquest. A letter from the 14th century shows that there were still four bishoprics left in North Africa, admittedly a sharp decline from the over four hundred bishoprics in existence at the time of the Arab conquest. The Almohad Abd al-Mu'min forced the Christians and Jews of Tunis to convert in 1159. Ibn Khaldun hinted at a native Christian community in 14th century in the villages of Nefzaoua, south-west of Tozeur. They paid the jizya and had some people of Frankish descent among them. Berber Christians continued to live in Tunis and Nefzaoua in the south of Tunisia until the early 15th century, and "[i]n the first quarter of the fifteenth century, we even read that the native Christians of Tunis, though much assimilated, extended their church, perhaps because the last of the persecuted Christians from all over the Maghreb had gathered there."

Another group of Christians who came to North Africa after being deported from Islamic Spain were called the Mozarabs. They were recognised as forming the Moroccan Church by Pope Innocent IV.

In June 1225, Honorius III issued the bull Vineae Domini custodes, which permitted two friars of the Dominican Order, named Dominic and Martin, to establish a mission in Morocco and look after the affairs of Christians there. The Bishop of Morocco, Lope Fernandez de Ain, was made the head of the Church of Africa, the only church officially allowed to preach in the continent, on 19 December 1246 by Pope Innocent IV. Innocent IV asked the emirs of Tunis, Ceuta and Bugia to permit Lope and Franciscian friars to look after the Christians in those regions. He thanked Caliph al-Sa'id for granting protection to the Christians and requested to allow them to create fortresses along the shores, but the Caliph rejected that request.

The bishopric of Marrakesh continued to exist until the late 16th century and was borne by the suffragans of Seville. Juan de Prado had attempted to re-establish the mission but was killed in 1631. Franciscan monasteries continued to exist in the city until the 18th century.

Another phase of Christianity in Africa began with the arrival of the Portuguese in the 15th century. After the end of Reconquista, the Christian Portuguese and Spanish captured many ports in North Africa.

== Literature ==
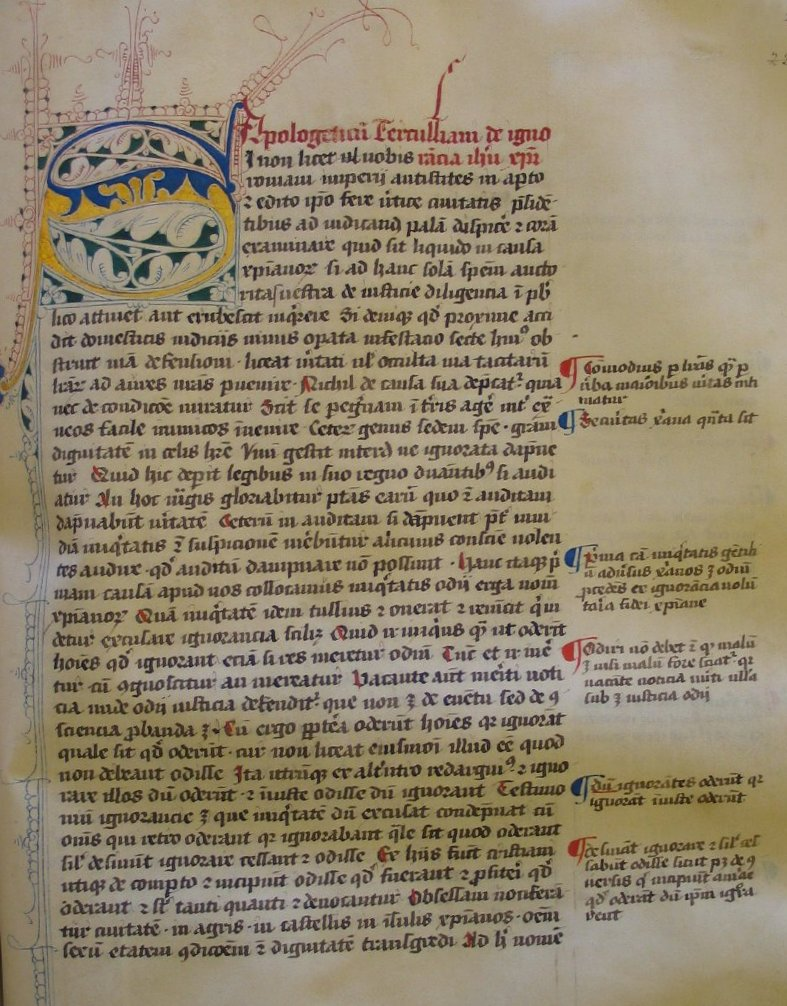
A manuscript of Tertullian's Apologeticus from the 1440s.

The ecclesiastical literature of Christian Africa is the most important of Latin Christian literatures. The first name that presents itself is Tertullian, an admirable writer, much of whose work we still possess, notwithstanding the lacunae due to lost writings. Such works as the Passio S. Perpetuae have been attributed to him, but the great apologist stands so complete that he has no need to borrow from others. Not that Tertullian is always remarkable for style, ideas, and theology, but he has furnished matter for very suggestive studies. His style, indeed, is often exaggerated, but his faults are those of a period not far removed from the great age of Latin literature. Nor are all his ideas alike novel and original, so that what seems actually to be his own gains in importance on that very account. In contradistinction to the apologists of, and before, his time, Tertullian refused to make Christian apologetics merely defensive; he appealed to the law of the Empire, claimed the right to social existence, and took the offensive.

His theology is sometimes daring, and even inaccurate, his morality inadmissible through very excess. Some of the treatises that come down to us were written after he separated from the Catholic Church. Yet, whatever verdict may be passed on him, his works remain among the most valuable of Christian antiquity.

The lawyer Minucius Felix has shown so much literary skill in his short treatises of a few pages that he has deservedly attained to fame. The correspondence, treatises, and sermons of St. Cyprian, Bishop of Carthage, belong approximately to the middle of the 3rd century, the correspondence forming one of the most valuable sources for the history of Christianity in Africa and the West during his time. His relations with the Church of Rome, the councils of Carthage, his endless disputes with the African bishops, take the place, to some extent, of the lost documents of the period.

St. Cyprian, indeed, although an orator before he became a bishop, is not Tertullian's equal in the matter of style. His treatises are well composed, and written with art; they do not, however, contain that inexhaustible abundance of views and perspectives that are the sole privilege of certain very lofty minds.

Arnobius, the author of an apology for Christianity, is of a secondary interest; Lactantius, more cultured and more literary, only belongs to Africa by reason of the richness of his genius. The peculiar bent of his talent is purely Ciceronian, nor was he trained in the schools of his native land. Among these, each of whom has his name and place, there moved others, almost unknown, or hidden under an impenetrable anonymity. Writings collected among the Spuria of Latin literature have been sometimes attributed to Tertullian, sometimes to St. Cyprian, or even to Pope Victor, the contemporary of the Emperor Commodus. Other authors, again, such as Maximius of Madaura and Victorinus, stand, with Optatus of Milevi, in the front rank of African literature in the 4th century before the appearance of St. Augustine.

The literary labours of St. Augustine are so closely connected with his work as a bishop that it is difficult, at the present time, to separate one from the other. He wrote not for the sake of writing, but for the sake of doing. From the year 386 onward, his treatises appeared every year. Such profuseness is often detrimental to their literary worth; but what is more injurious, however, was his own carelessness concerning beauty of form, of which he hardly ever seems to think in his solicitude about other things. His aim above all else was to ensure conviction. The result is that we have the few beautiful passages that fell from his pen. It is to the loftiness of his thought, rather than to the culture of his mind, that we owe certain pages which are admirable, but not perfect. The language of Augustine was Latin indeed, but a Latin that had already entered on its decline. His desire was to be understood, not to be admired, which explains the shortcomings of his work in respect of style.

But when from his style we pass to his thoughts, we may admire almost unreservedly. Even here we find occasional traces of bad taste, but it is the taste of his period: florid, fond of glitter, puns, refinements – in a word – of the weaknesses of contemporary Latin.

Of all St. Augustine's vast labours, the most important, as they are among the first Christian writings, are: The Confessions, the City of God, and the Commentary on the Gospel of St. John. As regards theology, his works gave Christianity an impulse that was felt for centuries. The doctrine of the Trinity supplied him with matter for the most finished exposition to be found among the works of the Doctors of the Church. Other writers, theologians, poets, or historians, are to be met with after St. Augustine's time, but their names, honourable as they are, cannot compare in fame with the great ones we record as belonging to the 3rd and 4th centuries. The endeavour of St. Fulgentius, Bishop of Ruspe, is to think and write as a faithful disciple of St. Augustine. Dracontius, a meritorious poet, lacks elevation. Only an occasional line deserves a place among the poetry that does not die. Victor of Vita, an impetuous historian, makes us sometimes wish, in presence of his too literary descriptions, for the monotonous simplicity of the chronicles, with their rigorous exactness. In the theological or historical writings of Facundus of Hermiane, Verecundus, and Victor of Tunnunum, may be found bursts of passion of literary merit, but often of doubtful historical accuracy.

The writings of African authors, e.g., Tertullian and St. Augustine, are full of quotations drawn from the Sacred Scriptures. These fragmentary texts are among the most ancient witnesses to the Latin Bible, and are of great importance, not only in connection with the formation of the style and vocabulary of the Christian writers of Africa, but also in regard to the establishment of the biblical text. Africa is represented at the present day by a group of texts that preserved a version commonly known as the "African Version" of the New Testament. It may now be taken as certain that there never existed in early Christian Africa an official Latin text known to all the Churches, or used by the faithful to the exclusion of all others. The African bishops willingly allowed corrections to be made in a copy of the Sacred Scriptures, or even a reference, when necessary, to the Greek text. With some exceptions, it was the Septuagint text that prevailed, for the Old Testament, until the 4th century. In the case of the New, the MSS. were of the western type. (See Biblical canon.) On this basis arose a variety of translations and interpretations. The existence of a number of versions of the Bible in Africa does not imply, however, that no one version was more widely used and generally received than the rest, i.e., the version found nearly complete in the works of St. Cyprian. Yet even this version was not without rivals. Apart from discrepancies in two quotations of the same text in the works of two different authors, and sometimes of the same author, we know that of several books of Scripture there were versions wholly independent of each other. At least three different versions of Daniel were used in Africa during the 3rd century. In the middle of the fourth, the Donatist Tychonius uses and collates two versions of the Apocalypse.

== Liturgy ==
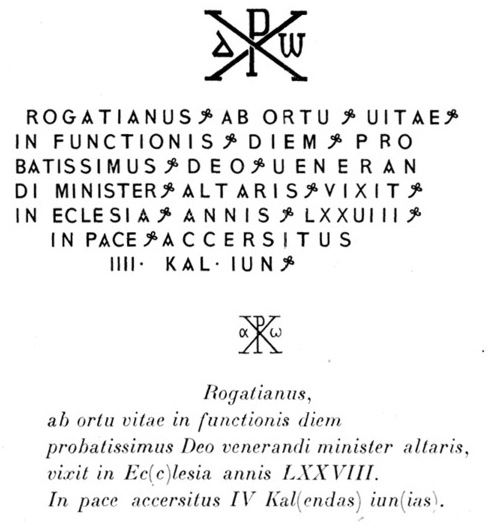
Epitaph of a berber patriarch found in the actual Ouled Moumen, Souk Ahras Province

The liturgy of the African Church is known to us from the writings of the Fathers, but there exists no complete work, no liturgical book, belonging to it. The writings of Tertullian, of St. Cyprian, of St. Augustine are full of valuable indications that indicate the liturgy of Africa presented many characteristic points of contact with the liturgy of the Roman Church. The liturgical year comprised the feasts in honour of Our Lord and a great number of feasts of martyrs, which are offset by certain days of penance. Africa, however, does not seem to have conformed rigorously, in this matter, with what was else customary. For the station days. the fast was not continued beyond the third hour after noon. Easter in the African Church had the same character as in other Churches; it continued to draw a part of the year into its orbit by fixing the date of Lent and of the Paschal season, while Pentecost and the Ascension likewise gravitated around it. Christmas and the Epiphany were kept clearly apart, and had fixed dates. The cultus of the martyrs is not always to be distinguished from that of the dead, and it is only by degrees that the line was drawn between the martyrs who were to be invoked and the dead who were to be prayed for. The prayer (petition) for a place of refreshment, refrigerium, bears witness to the belief of an interchange of help between the living and the departed. In addition, moreover, to the prayer for the dead, we find in Africa the prayer for certain classes of the living.

== Dialects ==
Several languages were used simultaneously by the people of Africa; the northern part seems at first to have been a Latin-speaking country. Indeed, the first few centuries had a flourishing Latin literature, many schools, and famous rhetoricians. However, Greek was spoken at Carthage in the 2nd century, and some of Tertullian's treatises were written also in Greek. The steady advance of Roman civilization caused the neglect and the abandonment of Greek. At the beginning of the 3rd century an African, chosen at random, would have expressed himself more easily in Greek than in Latin. Two hundred years later, St. Augustine and the poet Dracontius had at best but a slight knowledge of Greek. As to local dialects, we know little. No work of Christian literature written in Punic has come down to us, though there can be no doubt that the clergy and faithful used a language much spoken in Carthage and in the coast towns of the Proconsular Province. The lower and middle classes spoke Punic, and the Circumcellions were to be among the last of its defenders. The Christian writers almost wholly ignore the native Libyan, or Berber, dialect. St. Augustine, indeed, tells us that this writing was only in use among the nomad tribes.

== Episcopal sees ==
Ancient episcopal sees of Proconsular Africa listed in the Annuario Pontificio as titular sees of the Catholic Church:

- Abbir Germaniciana
- Abbir Maius (Henchir-en-Naam)
- Abitinae
- Abora
- Absa Salla
- Abthugni (Henchir-Casbat-Es-Souar)
- Abziri (near Oudna)
- Agbia (Aïn-Hedia in Tunisia), suffragan of Carthage
- Altiburus (Henchir-Medeina, Dahmani)
- Apisa Maius (ruins of Targ-Ech-Chena)
- Aptuca (Henchir-Oudeca)
- Aquae in Proconsulari (Henchir-El-Baghla)
- Aquae Novae in Proconsulari (ruins of Sidi-Ali-Djebin?)
- Aradi (Henchir-Bou-Arada?)
- Assuras
- Ausana
- Ausuaga
- Avensa (ruins of Bordj-Hamdouna)
- Avioccala (ruins of Sidi-Amara)
- Avissa (Henchir-Bour-Aouitta, Aouïa?)
- Avitta Bibba
- Belali (Henchir-Belli)
- Bencenna (ruins of Sidi-Brahim)
- Beneventum (Africa) (ruins of Beniata?)
- Bilta (ruins of Sidi-Salah-El-Balthi?)
- Bisica (Henchir-Bijga)
- Bita
- Bitettum (Bitetto)
- Bonusta
- Boseta (ruins of Henchir-El-Oust?)
- Bossa
- Botriana
- Bulla (ruins of Sidi-Mbarec)
- Bulla Regia
- Bulna
- Bure (North Africa)
- Buruni (Henchir-El-Dakhla)
- Buslacena
- Caeciri
- Canapium (Henchir-El-Casbath)
- Carpi (Henchir-Mraïssa)
- Carthage (episcopal see), the Metropolitan Archdiocese, exercising informal primacy
- Cefala (Ras-El-Djebel?)
- Cellae in Proconsulari (ruins of Aïn-Zouarin)
- Cerbali
- Cilibia (Henchir-Kelbia)
- Cincari (ruins of Bordj-Toum)
- Cissita (Sidi-Tabet?)
- Clypia (Kelibia)
- Cresima (Aïn-Sbir?)
- Cubda
- Culusi (suburb of Carthage)
- Curubis (Korba, Tunisia)
- Drusiliana (Khanguet-El-Kidem)
- Eguga
- Elephantaria in Proconsulari (Sidi-Ahmed-Djedidi? ruins of Sidi-Saïd?)
- Enera
- Furnos Maior
- Furnos Minor
- Gisipa
- Giufi (Bir-Mecherga)
- Giufi Salaria (near the saltworks of Sebkha-El-Coursia)
- Gor (Drâa-El-Gamra)
- Gummi in Proconsulari (Bordj-Cedria)
- Gunela
- Hilta
- Hippo Diarrhytus
- Horta (in the territory of Srâ-Orta?)
- Lacubaza
- Lapda
- Lares (Lorbeus)
- Libertina (ruins at Souc-El-Arba?)
- Luperciana (Henchir-Tebel? or ruins of Gasseur-Tatoun?)
- Marcelliana (in the region of Henchir-Bez)
- Mathara in Proconsulari (Mateur)
- Mattiana
- Maxula Prates (Radès)
- Medeli (Henchir-Mencoub)
- Megalopolis in Proconsulari (ruins of Mohammedia)
- Melzi (ruins where the Oued-Melzi flows into the Bagrada)
- Membressa (Majaz al Bab)
- Migirpa (near Carthage)
- Missua (Sidi Daoud)
- Mizigi (ruins of Douela)
- Mulli
- Musti
- Muzuca in Proconsulari (Henchir-Khachoum)
- Naraggara
- Neapolis in Proconsulari (Nabeul)
- Nova
- Numluli (Henchir-Mâtria)
- Obba
- Paria in Proconsulari
- Pertusa (El-Haraïria)
- Pia
- Pisita (ruins of Bou-Chateur-Sidi-Mansour?)
- Pocofeltus
- Pupiana (Mra-Mita, Aïn-Ouassel?)
- Puppi
- Rucuma
- Rusuca (Ghar al Milh?)
- Saia Maior (Henchir-Duamès-Chiaïa, Henchir-Chiaïa)
- Scilium
- Sebarga
- Selamselae
- Semina
- Semta (Dzemda)
- Serra (Henchir-Cherri)
- Sicca Veneria
- Siccenna
- Sicilibba (ruins of Alaouine, Alaouenine)
- Simidicca (Henchir-Simidia?)
- Simingi (Henchir-Simindja, Sidi Bou Zid)
- Siminina (Henchir-El-Haïrech, Bir-El-Djedidi)
- Simitthu (Chemtou)
- Sinna (ruins of Calaat-Es-Sinân)
- Sinnuara
- Sitipa
- Suas (ruins of Chaouach)
- Succuba
- Sululos
- Sutunura (ruins of Aïn-El-Askerm Rdir-Es-Soltan)
- Tabbora
- Tacia Montana (ruins of Bordj-Messaoudi)
- Taddua
- Tagarata (ruins of Tel-El-Caid, Aïn-Tlit?)
- Teglata (Henchir Kahloulta)
- Tela (in the region of Carthage)
- Tepela (Henchir-Bel-Aït)
- Thabraca
- ? Thapsus (in Byzacena?!)
- Theudalis (Henchir-Aouam)
- Thibaris
- Thibica (Bir-Magra)
- Thibiuca (Henchir-Gâssa)
- Thignica
- Thisiduo (ruins of Crich-El-Oued)
- Thimida (Henchir-Tindja)
- Thizica
- Thuburbo Maius
- Thuburbo Minus
- Thuburnica (Sidi-Ali-Bel-Cassem)
- Thubursicum-Bure (Téboursouk)
- Thuccabora (Touccabeur)
- Thugga
- Thunigaba (Henchir-Aïn-Laabed)
- Thunusruma
- Thunusuda (Sidi-Meskin)
- Tigimma (Souk-El-Djemma, Djemâa?)
- Tinisa in Proconsulari (Râs-El-Djebel)
- Tisili
- Tituli in Proconsulari (Henchir-Madjouba)
- Torreblanda
- Trisipa (Aïn-El-Hammam)
- Tubernuca (Aïn Tebernoc)
- Tubyza (Henchir-Boucha?)
- Tulana
- Tunes
- Turris in Proconsulari (in the territory of Henchir-Mest)
- Turuda
- Turuzi
- Uccula (Henchir-Aïn-Dourat)
- Uchi Maius (Henchir-Ed-Douamès)
- Ucres (Bordj-Bou-Djadi)
- Ululi (Ellez?)
- Urusi (Henchir-Sougda)
- Uthina
- Utica
- Utimma (between Sidi-Medien and Henchir-Reoucha?)
- Utimmira (in the territory of Carthage)
- Uzalis
- Uzzipari
- Vaga (Béja)
- Vallis (ruins of Sidi-Medien)
- Vazari (Henchir-Bejar, Bedjar)
- Vazari-Didda (Henchir-Badajr?)
- Vazi-Sarra (Henchir-Bez)
- Vertara (region of Srâa Ouartane)
- Vicus Turris (Henchir-El-Djemel)
- Villamagna in Proconsulari (Henchir-Mettich)
- Vina (Henchir-El-Meden)
- Vinda (Henchir-Bandou?)
- Voli
- Zama Major
- Zama Minor
- Zarna
- Zica (Zaghouan?)
- Zuri (Aïn Djour? in the region of Carthage?)

== See also ==
- Catholic Church in Africa
- Muslim conquest of the Maghreb
- Archdiocese of Carthage
- Roman Catholic Archdiocese of Tunis
