= Catholic Church in Tunisia =

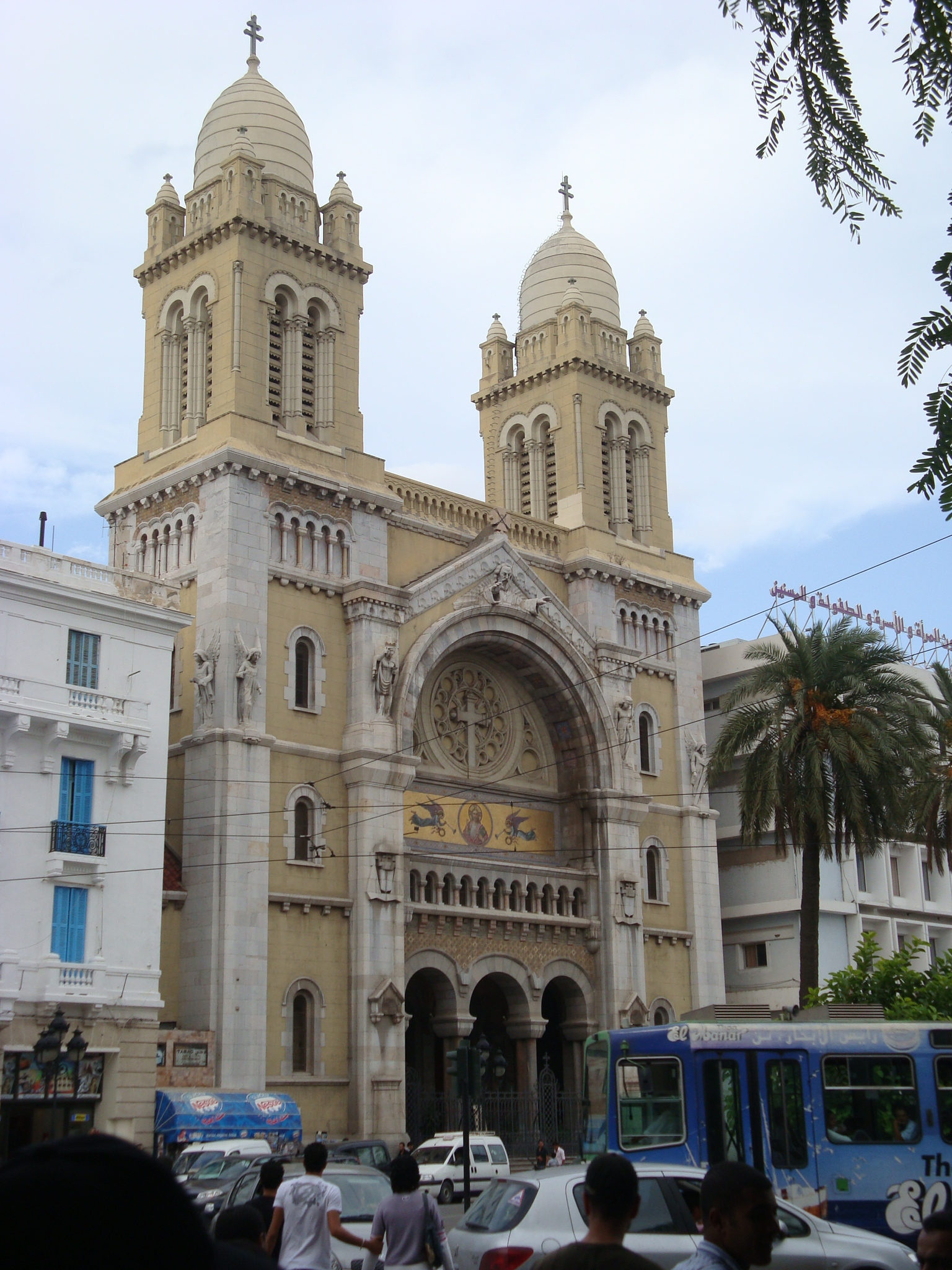
The Cathedral of St. Vincent de Paul in Tunis is now the only Catholic cathedral in the country.

The Catholic Church in Tunisia is part of the worldwide Catholic Church, under the spiritual leadership of the Pope in Rome.

== History ==
=== Middle Ages ===
By the mid of the eleventh century, only five bishoprics remained in all of Africa as mentioned in a letter by pope Leo IX who intervened in a struggle for precedence between the bishop of Gummi-Mahdia, who was favoured by the local rulers, and the bishop of Carthage, the traditional head of the church of Africa. Giles of Assisi and several other Franciscans came to Tunis in 1219 in order to preach to the Muslims, but they were send back by the local Christians in fear of repercussions.

Like the Almohads, the Hafsids maintained Christian mercenaries who lived in a neighbourhood closed off with a gate near the Hafsid palace complex. They worshipped in a church dedicated to Saint Francis of Assisi which visitors described as "very beautiful and great" and which was allowed to ring the bell, a practice forbidden by the so-called Pact of Umar and a privilege not granted to the Genoese and Venetian merchants who maintained chapels in their merchant quarters. When Jean Adorno visited Tunis in 1470, he described these Christians as assimilated culturally and linguistically into Tunisian society, though they remained Christians and would sing in Latin during mass.

=== Tunisian independence ===
From the late 19th century to after World War II, Tunisia was home to large populations of Christian French, Italian and Maltese descent (255,000 Europeans in 1956). The number of Catholics fell following Tunisian independence. The ownership of many Catholic buildings, including the Saint Louis Cathedral, was transferred to the state under a modus vivendi reached between the Holy See and the Republic of Tunisia.

== Dioceses ==
The Catholic church in Tunisia presently comprises only a single Latin archbishopric, in the national capital Tunis :

- the non-Metropolitan Archdiocese of Tunis.

There are no Eastern Catholic, pre-diocesan or other exempt jurisdictions in Tunisia.

As this solo-episcopate warrants no national conference, it participates in the regional Episcopal conference of Northern Africa (French: Conférence Episcopale Régionale du Nord de l’Afrique, C.E.R.N.A.) together with Algeria, Morocco (hosting the headquarters in Rabat), Western Sahara and Libya, the 'Great Maghreb' (Arab region West of Egypt).

There is also an Apostolic Nunciature (papal diplomatic representation at embassy-level) to Tunisia, which is however vested in the Apostolic Nunciature to neighbour Algeria (in Algiers).

All defunct jurisdictions are precursors of current (residential or, mostly, titular) sees.

=== Archdiocese ===
There are around 30,700 Catholics in this predominantly Islamic country, which forms a single diocese – the Archdiocese of Tunis. Accordingly, the only Catholic cathedral is that of St. Vincent de Paul in Tunis. The building was completed in 1897, while Tunisia was a French protectorate. Catholic influence during the colonial period also included extensive missionary work by the French Primate of Africa, Cardinal Lavigerie. The cathedral in his time was the church of Saint Louis in Carthage, was also built in the 19th century, when the archdiocese, under Cardinal Lavigerie, held the primacy of all Roman Africa.

=== Titular sees ===
- One Metropolitan Titular archbishopric : Carthage [Ancient & modern]
- 343 Episcopal Titular bishoprics : Abaradira, Abari, Abbir Germaniciana, Abbir Maius, Abidda, Abitinæ, Abora, Absa Salla, Abthugni, Abziri, Acholla, Æliæ, Africa (see), Afufenia, Agbia, Aggar, Aggersel, Altiburus, Ammædara, Amudarsa, Ancusa, Apisa maius, Aptuca, Aquæ Albæ in Byzacena, Aquæ in Byzacena, Aquæ in Proconsulari, Aquæ novæ in Proconsulari, Aquæ regiæ, Aradi, Assuras, Aurusuliana, Ausafa, Ausana, Ausuaga, Autenti, Auzegera, Avensa, Avioccala, Avissa, Avitta Bibba, Bahanna, Bararus, Basilinoplis, Bassiana, Bavagaliana, Belali, Bencenna, Beneventum, Bennefa, Bilta, Bisica, Bladia, Bonusta, Boseta, Bossa, Botriana, Buleliana, Bulla, Bulla regia, Bulna, Bure, Buruni, Buslacena, Cabarsussi, Cæciri, Canapium, Capsa, Carcabia, Cariana, Carpi, Cebarades, Cefala, Cellæ in Proconsulari, Cenæ, Cenculiana, Cerbali, Cercina, Chusira, Cibaliana, Cilibia, Cillium, Cincari, Cissita, Clypia, Crepedula, Cresima, Cubda, Cufruta, Culusi, Curubis, Decoriana, Dices, Dionysiana, Druas, Drusiliana, Dura, Edistiana, Egnatia, Byzacena, Eguga, Elephantaria in Proconsulari, Febiana, Feradi maius, Feradi minus, Filaca, Fissiana, Foratiana, Forontoniana, Furnos maior, Furnos minor, Gaguari, Garriana, Gemellæ in Byzacena, Germaniciana, Girba, Gisipa, Giufi, Giufi Salaria, Gor, Gratiana, Gubaliana, Gummi in Byzacena, Gummi in Proconsulari, Gunela, Gurza, Hadrumetum * (?formerly Metropolitan Archbishopric), Hermiana, Hierpiniana, Hilta, Hippo Diarrhytus, Hirina, Horrea Cœlia, Horta, Iubaltiana, Iunca in Byzacena, Lacubaza, Lapda, Lares, Leptiminus, Libertina, Limisa, Luperciana, Macon, Macriana maior, Macriana minor, Mactaris, Madarsuma, Maraguia, Marazanæ, Marazanæ regiæ, Marcelliana, Masclianæ, Matara in Proconsulari, Materiana, Mattiana, Maximiana in Byzacena, Maxula Prates, Medeli, Mediana, Megalopolis in Proconsulari, Melzi, Membressa, Menefessi, Mibiarca, Midica, Mididi, Migirpa, Mimiana, Missua, Mizigi, Mozotcori, Mulli, Munatiana, Musti, Mutia, Muzuca in Byzacena, Muzuca in Proconsulari, Nara, Naraggara, Nationa, Neapolis in Proconsulari, Nepte, Nova, Numluli, Obba, Octaba, Octabia, Paria in Proconsolare, Pederodiana, Pertusa, Pia, Pisita, Præcausa, Præsidium, Pupiana, Puppi, Putia in Byzacena, Quæstoriana, Rucuma, Rufiniana, Ruspæ, Rusuca, Saia maior, Sassura, Scebatiana, Scilium, Sebarga, Segermes, Selemselæ, Selendeta, Semina, Semta, Septimunicia, Serra, Severiana, Sicca Veneria, Siccenna, Sicilibba, Simidicca, Simingi, Siminina, Simitthu, Sinna, Sinnuara, Suas (Chaouache?), Succuba, Sufes, Sufetula, Suliana, Sullectum, Sululos, Sutunurca, Tabalta, Tabbora, Tacia montana, Taddua, Tagarata, Tagarbala, Tagaria, Tagase, Talaptula, Tamalluma, Tamata, Tamazeni, Tambeæ, Tanudaia, Taparura, Taraqua, Tarasa in Byzacena, Teglata in Proconsulari, Tela, Temuniana, Tepelta, Tetci, Thabraca, Thagamuta, Thala, Thapsus, Thasbalta, Thelepte, Thenæ, Theudalis, Theuzi, Thibaris, Thibica, Thibiuca, Thiges, Thignica, Thimida, Thimida regia, Thisiduo, Thizica, Thuburbo maius, Thuburbo minus, Thuburnica, Thubursicum-Bure, Thucca terebenthina, Thuccabora, Thugga, Thunigaba, Thunudruma, Thunusuda, Thysdrus, Tigias, Tigimma, Tiguala, Tinisa in Proconsulari, Tisili, Tituli in Proconsulari, Trisipa, Trofimiana, Tubernuca, Tubulbaca, Tubyza, Tulana, Tunes (now Tunis), Tunnuna, Turres in Byzacena, Turris in Proconsulari, Turris Tamalleni, Turrisblanda, Turuzi, Tusuros, Uccula, Uchi maius, Ucres, Ululi, Unizibira, Uppenna, Urusi, Usula, Uthina, Utica, Utimma, Utimmira, Uzalis, Uzippari, Uzita, Vaga, Valentiniana, Vallis, Vartana, Vassinassa, Vazari, Vazari-Didda, Vazi-Sarra, Vegesela in Byzacena, Vertara, Vibiana, Victoriana, Vicus Aterii, Vicus Augusti, Vicus Turris, Villamagna in Proconsulari, Vina, Vinda, Vita, Voli, Zama maior, Zama minor, Zarna, Zella, Zica, Zuri.

== Facilities ==
In 2022, Catholics formed the majority (around 24,000 out of 30,000) of Christians in the country. In the past, the Diocese of Tunis operates 12 churches, 9 schools, several libraries, and 2 clinics as well as holding religious services, running a monastery, freely organized cultural activities, and performed charitable work throughout the country. Occasionally, Catholic religious groups held services in private residences or other locations.

== Ecumenical outreach ==
Pope John Paul II visited Tunisia on April 15, 1996, to give support to the Church there and called for a peaceful dialogue between Muslims and Christians across North Africa.

== Freedom of religion ==
In 2023, the country was scored 3 out of 4 for religious freedom. In the same year, it was ranked as the 36th worst place in the world to be a Christian.

== See also ==
- Religion in Tunisia
- Category:Churches in Tunisia
- List of Saints from Africa
- Sainte-Croix Church of Tunis, a former church building

== Sources ==
- Lower, Michael (July 2014). "The Papacy and Christian Mercenaries of Thirteenth-Century North Africa". Speculum. 89 (3): 601–631. doi:10.1017/S0038713414000761.
- Lower, Michael (20 October 2016). "Medieval European Mercenaries in North Africa". In France, John; DeVries, Kelly; Rogers, Clifford J. (eds.). Journal of Medieval Military History. Boydell & Brewer. pp. 119–120. ISBN 978-1-78327-130-6.
- Whalen, Brett Edward (2011). "Corresponding with Infidels: Rome, the Almohads, and the Christians of Thirteenth-Century Morocco". Journal of Medieval and Early Modern Studies. 41 (3): 487–513. doi:10.1215/10829636-1363927. ISSN 1082-9636.
