= Mutia, Africa =

Africa Proconsularis.

Mutia was an Ancient city and former bishopric in Roman Africa and remains a Latin Catholic titular see.

== History ==
Mutia was located at present Henchir-El-Gheria, Henchir-Furna, in the Sahel zone of modern Tunisia.

It was among the towns in the Roman province of Byzacena important enough to become a suffragan diocese in the papal sway, yet destined to fade (under the 7th century advent of Islam?).

Its only historically documented bishop was Latinus, participant at the Council of Cabarsussi, called in 393 by the dissident Maximianist sect of the Donatist heresy, and confirmed the synodal acts, with thanks to Saint Augustine.

== Titular see ==
The diocese was nominally restored in 1933 as Latin Titular bishopric of Mutia (Latin) / Muzia (Curiate Italian) / Mutien(sis) (Latin adjective).

It has had the following incumbents, so far of the fitting Episcopal (lowest) rank :

- José Guerra Campos (1964.06.15 – 1973.04.13) as Auxiliary Bishop of Archdiocese of Madrid (Spain) (1964.06.15 – 1973.04.13), Secretary General of Episcopal Conference of Spain (1966 – 1972); later Bishop of Cuenca (Spain) (1973.04.13 – retired 1996.06.26), died 1997
- Rafael Bellido Caro (1973.11.29 – 1980.03.03) as Auxiliary Bishop of Archdiocese of Sevilla (Spain) (1973.11.29 – 1980.03.03); later Bishop of Jerez de la Frontera (Spain) (1980.03.03 – retired 2000.06.29), died 2204
- Alfredo Noriega Arce, Jesuits (S.J.) (1980.04.26 – death 1993.06.26) as Auxiliary Bishop of Archdiocese of Lima (Peru) (1980.04.26 – 1993.06.26)
- Jésus Rocha (1993.12.01 – 2004.10.20) as Auxiliary Bishop of Archdiocese of Brasília (Brazil) (1993.12.01 – 2004.10.20); later Bishop of Oliveira (Brazil) (2004.10.20 – 2006.07.13)
- Edson de Castro Homem (2005.02.16 – 2015.05.06) as Auxiliary Bishop of Archdiocese of São Sebastião do Rio de Janeiro (Brazil) (2005.02.16 – 2015.05.06); later Bishop of Iguatu (Brazil) (2015.05.06 – ...)
- John Moon Hee-jong (2015.07.23 – ...), Auxiliary Bishop of Diocese of Suwon 수원 (South Korea) (2015.07.23 – ...).

Today, Muzia survives as a titular bishop's residence; the current titular bishop is John Moon Hee Jong, auxiliary bishop of Suwon

== See also ==
- List of Catholic dioceses in Tunisia

== Sources and external links ==
- J. Mesnage, L'Afrique chrétienne, Paris 1912, p. 71
