= Sainte-Croix Church of Tunis =

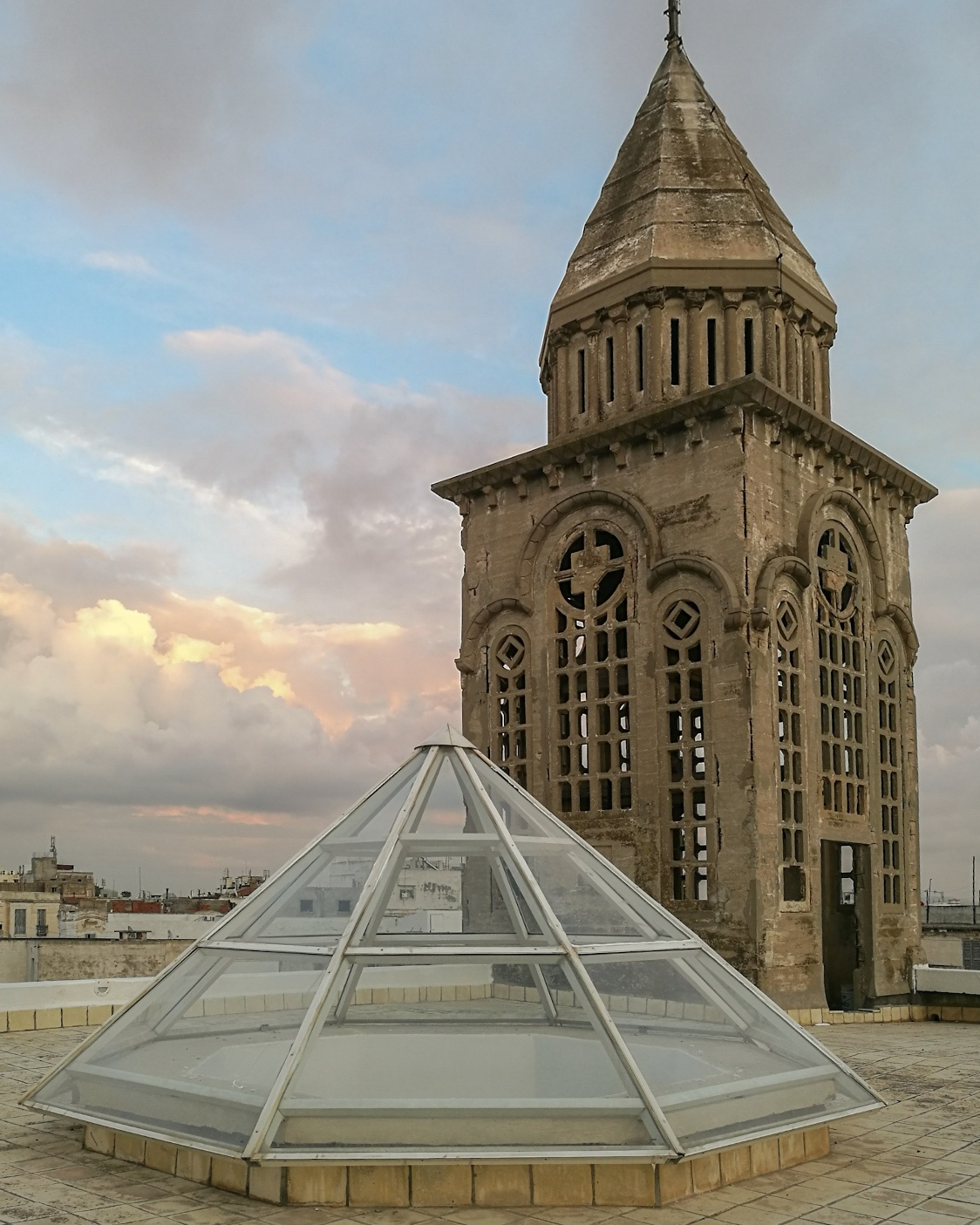
- Interactive map of Sainte-Croix Church of Tunis
- Type: Church
- Location: Tunis
- Area: Medina of Tunis
- Built: 19th century

The Sainte-Croix Church of Tunis is located in the medina of Tunis in Tunisia. It is a Roman Catholic church that was built in 1837 before the establishment of the French protectorate. Given to the Tunisian government in 1964, it now houses offices of the municipality.

== First buildings ==
This church is the first chapel since the disappearance of Christian communities in the eleventh century. The appearance of this church was due to the settle of a large convicts of Christian slaves who were captured before.

== Building the church ==
The increase in the Christian population makes it necessarily to build a bigger place of worship rather than the small chapels that were built for Christian slaves before.

== History ==
It was built without any external religious symbols outside so as to not offend the local population. However, the building quickly faced structural problems, as seen by Armand de Flaux who visited the church in 1861. Construction began and the new building is completed in 1865.

The neighborhood was populated by poor families and after the arrival of many Christian families from Malta or Italy there was increased local desire for Christian worship. Accordingly, the church was decorated with sixty statues of French, Sicilian and Maltese saints in a short time.

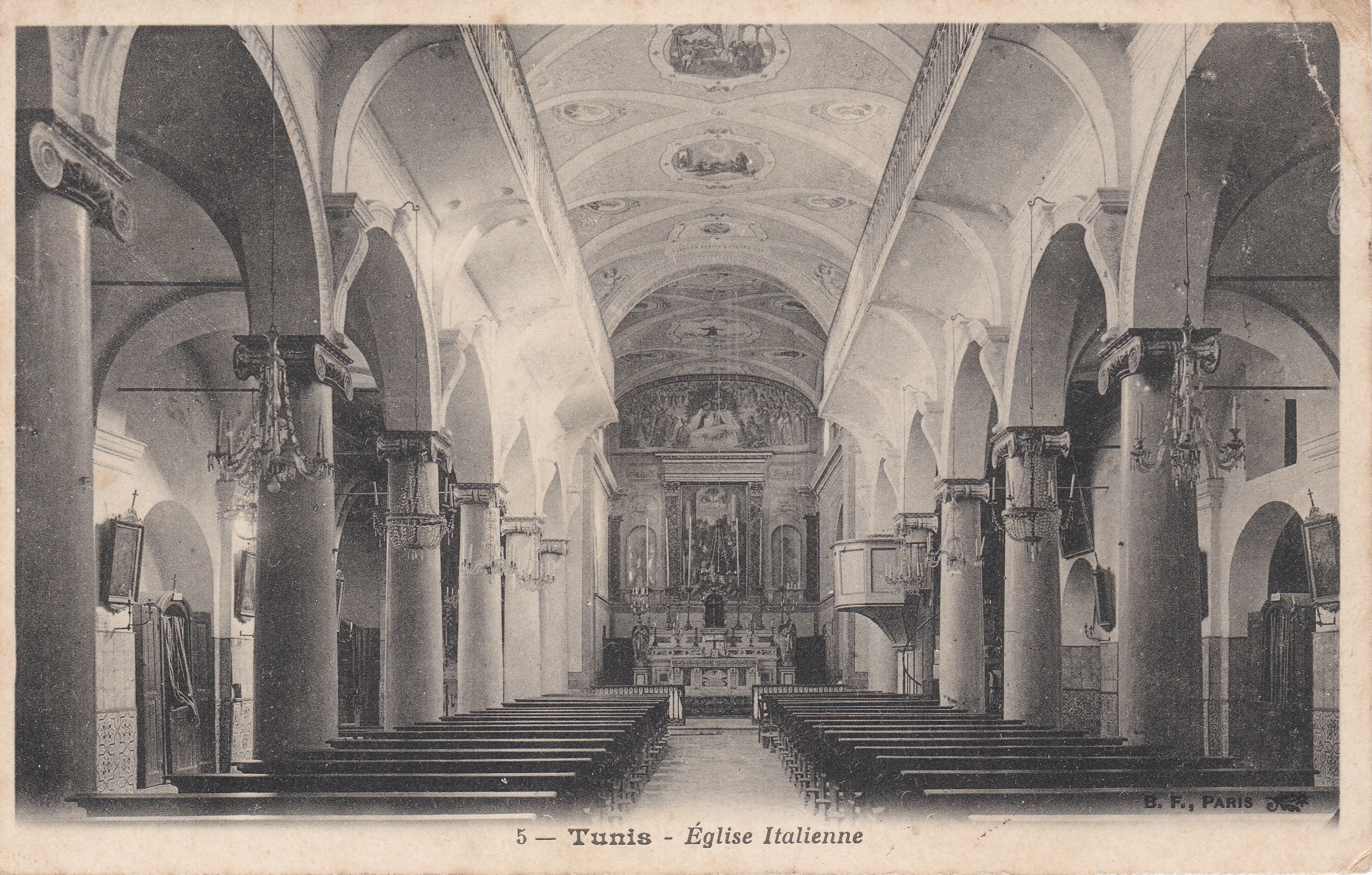
a postcard showing the church

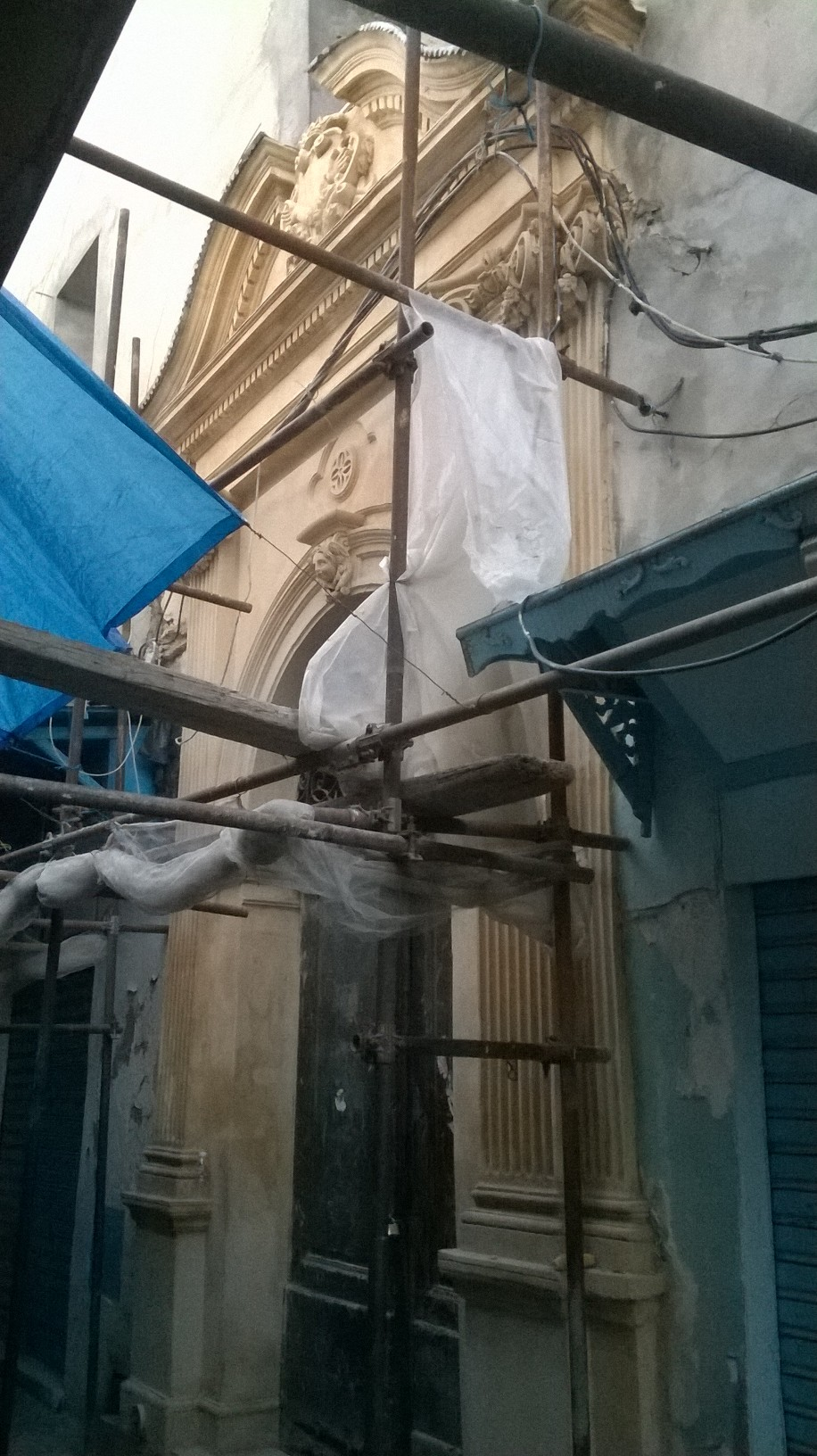
The access to the church

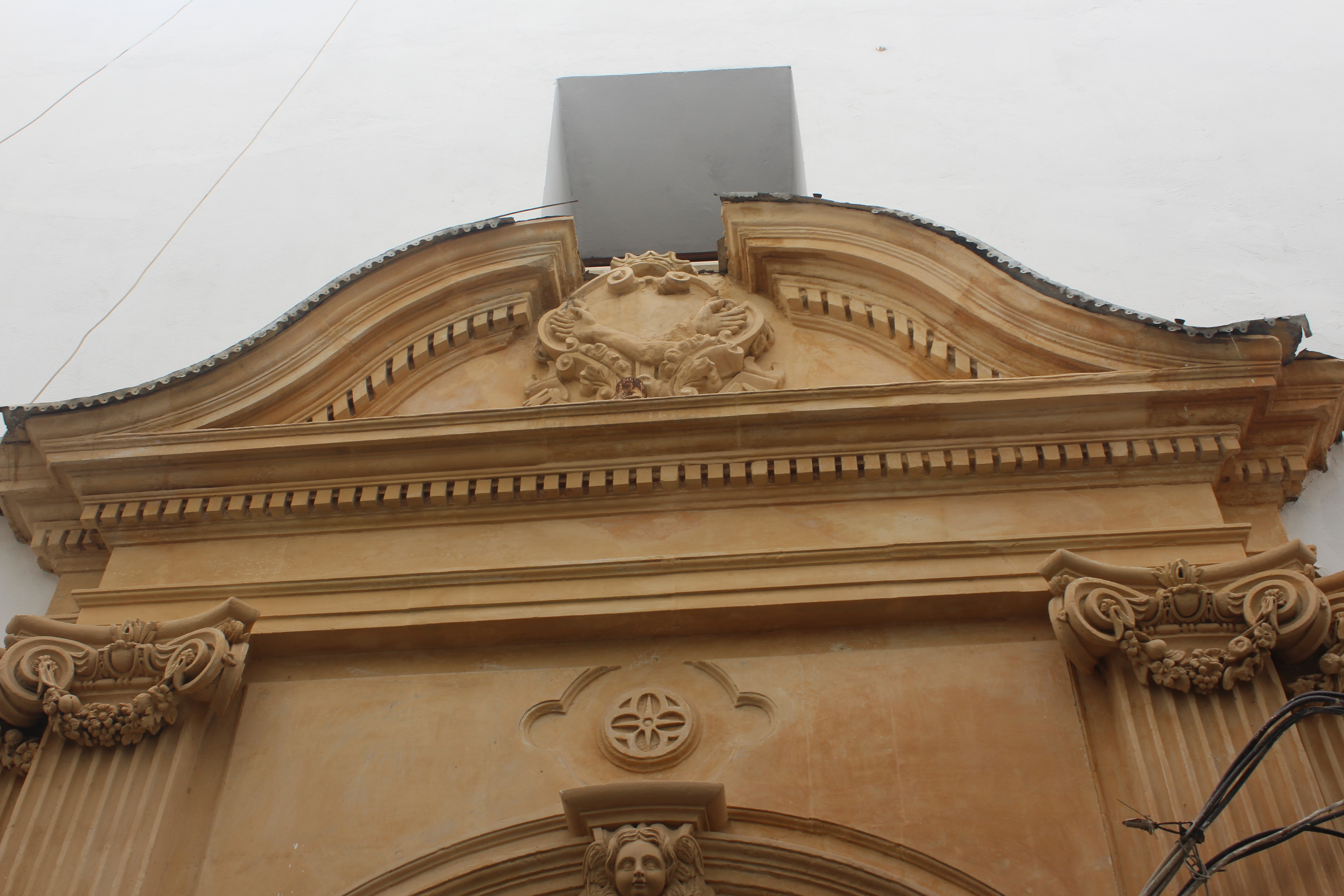
The architecture in the church

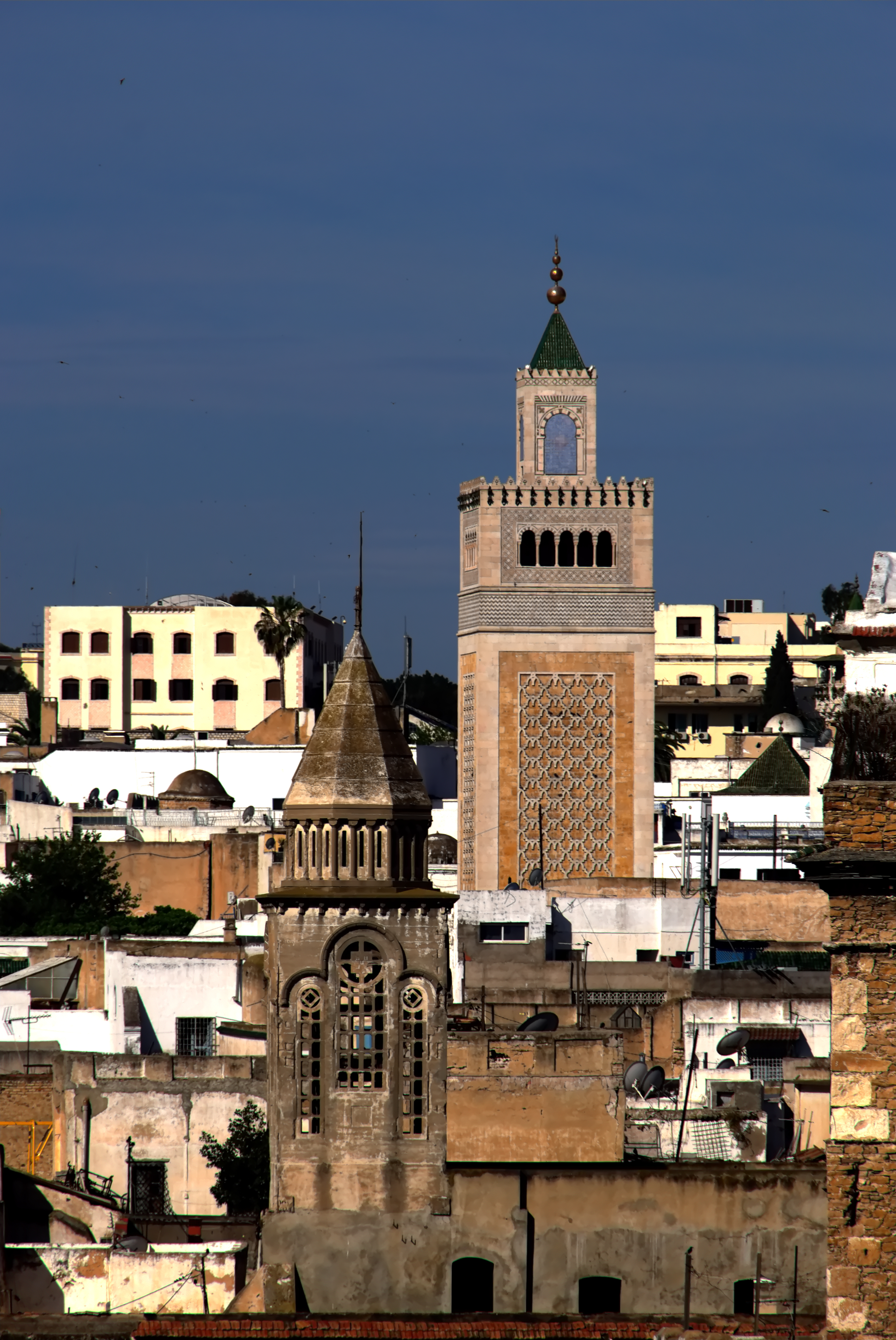
Outside view

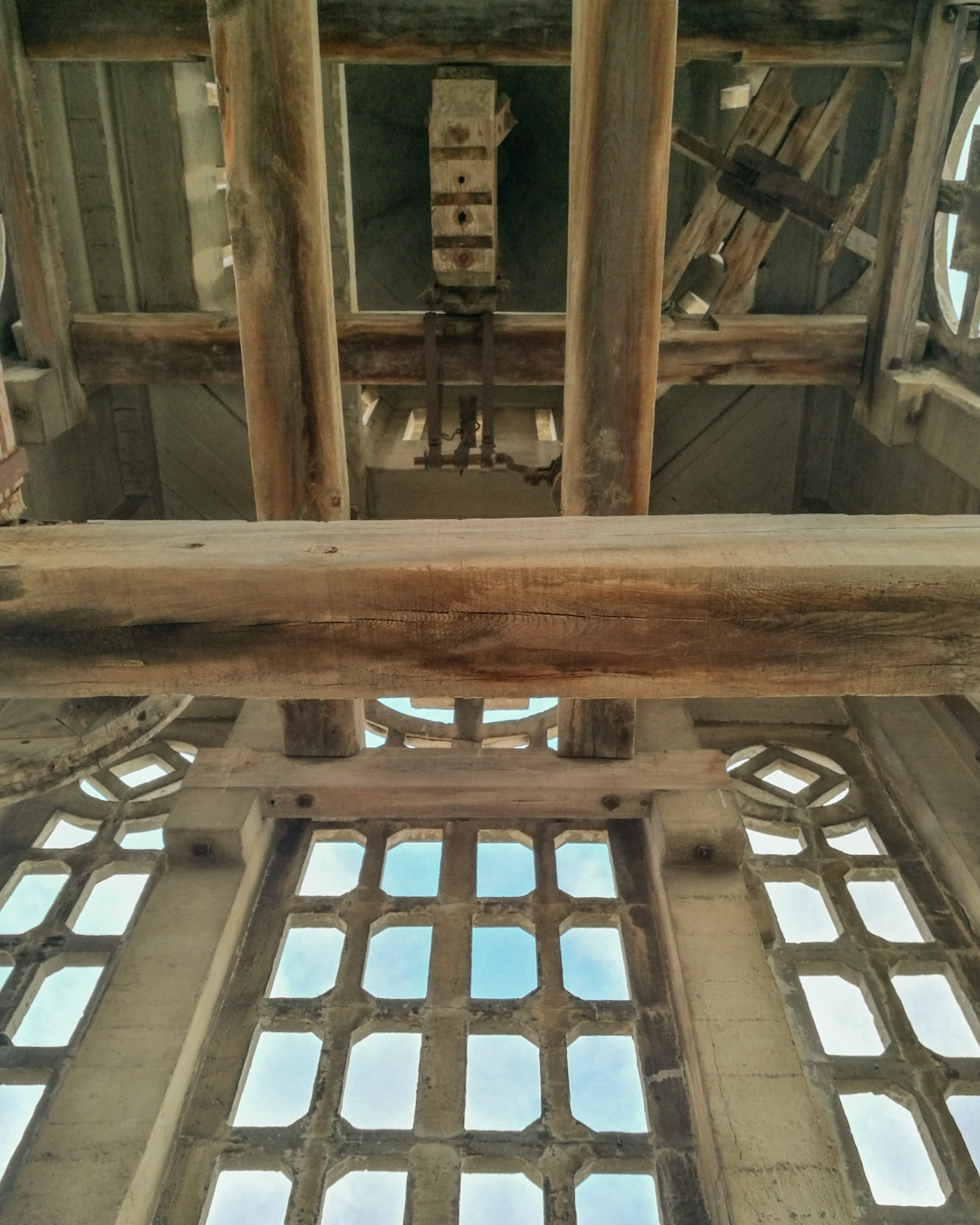
The interior of the church

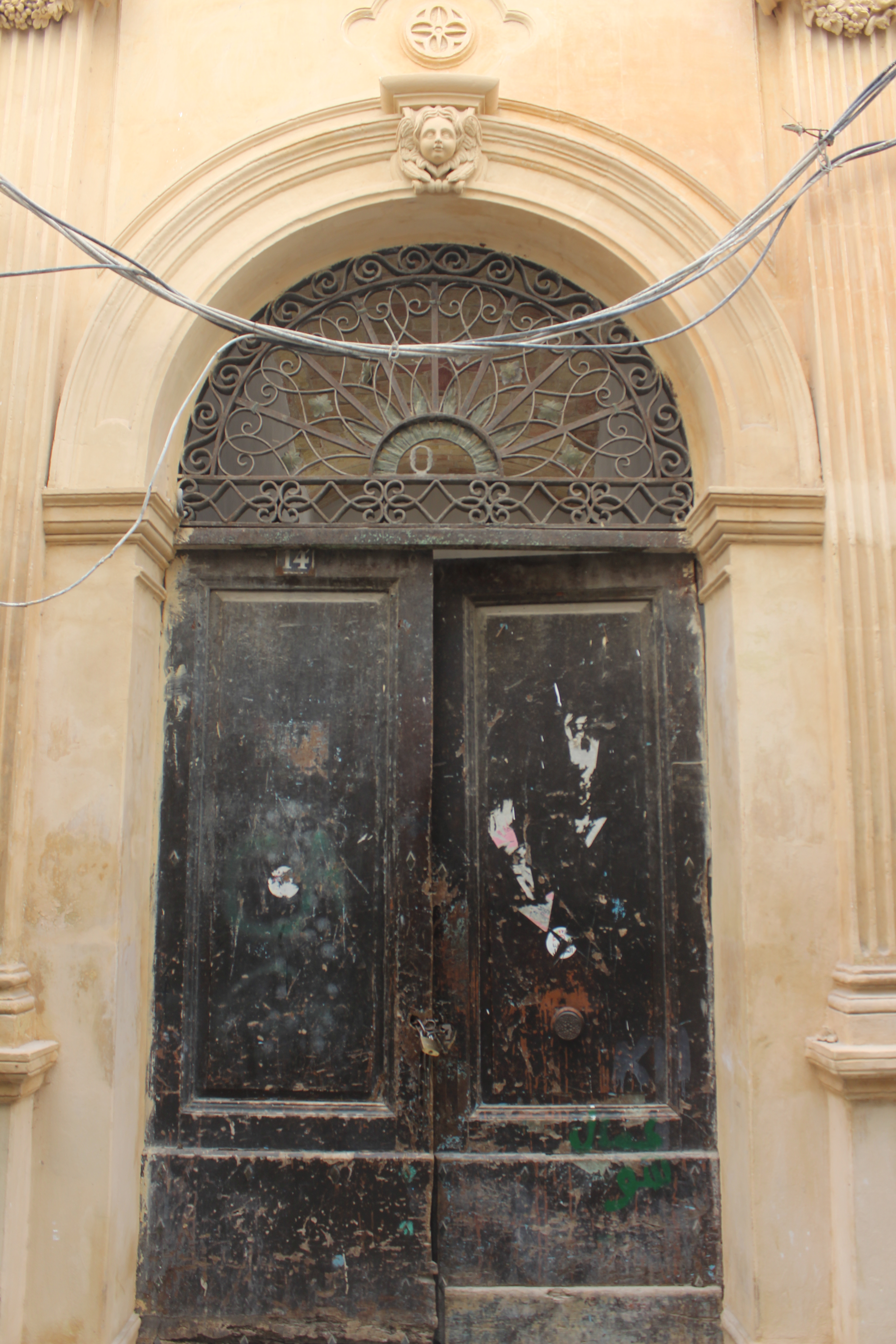
The entrance door of the church

== See also ==
- Catholic Church in Tunisia
