= Ausana =

Ausana was an ancient Roman-Berber city and bishopric in Tunisia. It is now a Latin Catholic titular see.

== History ==
Ausana was important enough in the Late Roman province of Africa Proconsularis to become one of the suffragans of its capital Carthage's Metropolitan Archbishopric.

== Titular see ==
The diocese was nominally restored in 1989 as Latin Catholic titular bishopric.

So far its only incumbent, of the fitting episcopal (lowest) rank, is:

- Former Bishop (1990.05.26 – 2020.10.26) Józef Zawitkowski, Auxiliary Bishop of Łowicz (Poland).
- Titular Bishop (2020.12.19 - ....) Raúl Pizarro, Auxiliary Bishop of Roman Catholic Diocese of San Isidro (Argentina).

== See also ==
- Catholic Church in Tunisia
