= Matara in Proconsulari =

Matara in Proconsulari is an ancient suppressed and titular see of the Roman Catholic Church in North Africa. It dates from the bishopric based in the Roman-era town of Matara, which has been identified with the modern town of Mateur, at 37°02′24″N 9°39′54″E in Tunisia. The current bishop is William J. Justice.
