= Refrigerium =

Funereal meal

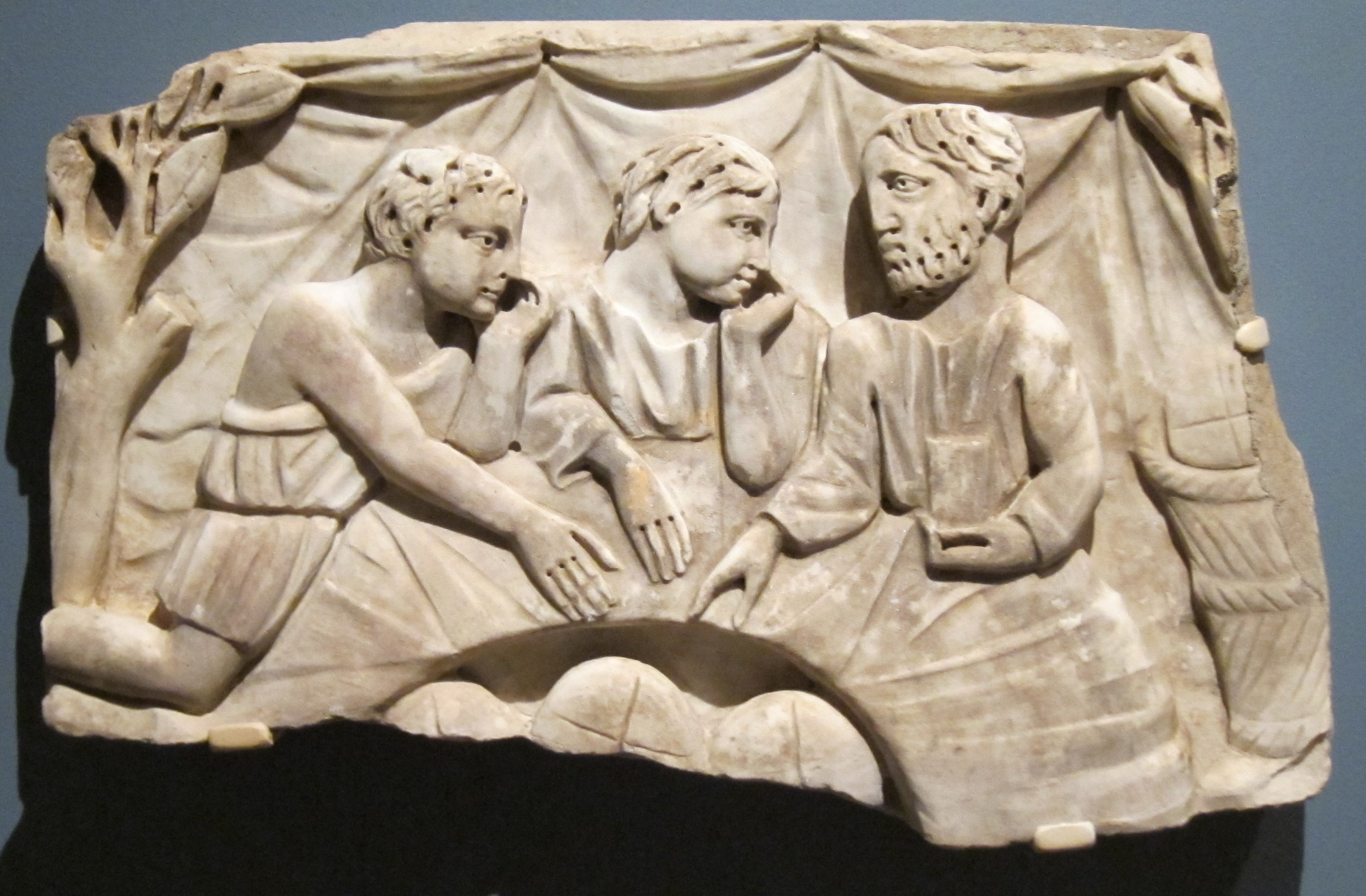
Marble relief showing a refrigerium (annual commemorative meal for the dead) from the vicinity of Ankara, Turkey, 3rd century CE, Honolulu Museum of Art

In ancient Rome, a refrigerium (lit. 'refreshment') was a commemorative meal for the dead, consumed in a graveyard.

These meals were held on the day of burial, then again on the ninth day after the funeral, and annually thereafter. Early Christians continued the refrigerium ritual, by taking food to gravesites and catacombs in honor of Christian martyrs, as well as relatives.

The early Christian theologian Tertullian used the term refrigerium interim to describe a happy state in which the souls of the blessed are refreshed while they await the Last Judgment and their definitive entry into heaven.

Later Christian writers referred to a similar, interim state of grace as the "Bosom of Abraham" (a term taken from Luke 16:22, 23). Tertullian's notions of refrigerium were part of a debate on whether the souls of the dead had to await the End of Times and the Last Judgment before their entrance into either heaven or hell, or whether, on the other hand, each soul was assigned its place in the eternal afterlife immediately after death (see particular judgment).

In C.S. Lewis's The Great Divorce, the concept is described as "the damned have holidays". In the book, the damned take an excursion to heaven (for refreshment) where they are invited to stay, although many are intimidated or too set in their ways to reckon with the weight of their sins and ultimately refuse.
