= Aquae in Proconsulari =

Former ancient city in Tunisia

Africa Proconsularis.

Aquae in Proconsulari is a former Ancient city and bishopric in Roman Africa and present Latin Catholic titular see.

Its modern location is Henchir-El-Baghla, in present Tunisia.

== History ==
Aquae Novae was important enough in the Roman province of Africa Proconsularis to become one of the many suffragans of its capital Carthage's Metropolitan Archbishopric, but faded.

== Titular see ==
The diocese was nominally restored in 1933 as a titular bishopric.

It has had the following incumbents, all of the lowest (episcopal) rank :

- José Fernandes Veloso (1966.03.23 – 1981.11.26), as Auxiliary Bishop of Roman Catholic Diocese of Petropolis (Brazil) (1966.03.23 – 1981.11.26), later promoted Coadjutor Bishop of Petrópolis (1981.11.26 – 1984.02.15) and succeeding as Bishop of Petrópolis (1984.02.15 – 1995.11.15)
- Salim Sayegh (1981.11.26 – ...), Auxiliary Bishop emeritus of the Latin Patriarchate of Jerusalem (Palestine, Holy Land)

== See also ==
- Aquae in Numidia
- Aquae Novae in Proconsulari
- Catholic Church in Tunisia
