= Bordj-Bou-Djadi =

Bordj-Bou-Djadi is an archaeological site and former Catholic diocese located on the outskirts of Tunis, Tunisia. The area is situated near Ucres, at 36.901123n, 9.97083e. It is now a Latin Catholic titular see.

== History ==
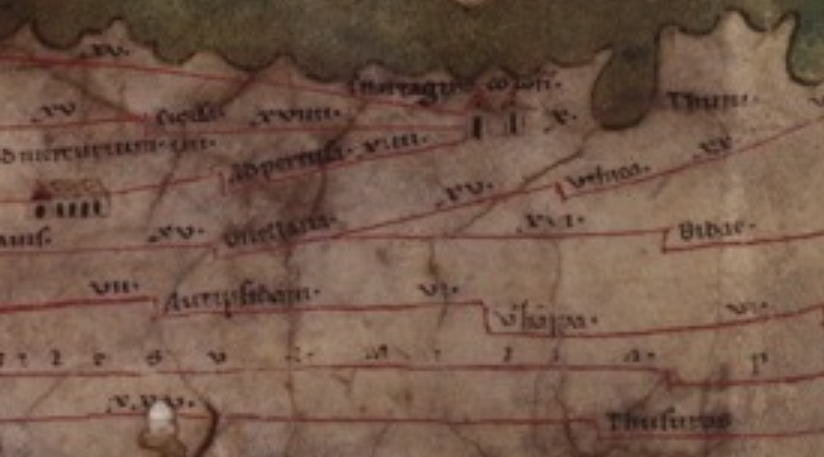
extract of the Tabula Peutingeriana showing Roman Ucres, Roman North Africa, during 4th century.

The stone ruins at Bordj-Bou-Djadi have been tentatively identified with the Roman–Berber town of Ucres, a civitas of the Roman province of Africa Proconsularis, important enough to become one of the many suffragans of Carthage, the Metropolitan at its capital. It flourished from 30BC until around 640AD.

Several of its bishops are known from antiquity:

- Vitalis fl. 314, participant at the Council of Arles in 314 which condemned Donatism as heresy.
- Victor fl. 404, whose son left an epitaph in Rome
- Maximinus participated in the Council of Carthage in 411 with other Catholic and Donatist bishops, including his schismatic counterpart Vitalis, 411
- Quoduultdeus fl. 416–429, participated in the Council of Carthage in 419 on appeals to Rome
- Exitiosus fl. 484, participated in the Council of Carthage called in 484 by king Huneric of the Vandal Kingdom, after which he was exiled, like most Catholic bishops.

== Titular see ==
The ancient diocese was nominally restored in 1933 as Latin titular bishopric of the Roman Catholic Church, as Ucres (Latin and Curiate Italian) / Ucren(sis) (Latin adjective)/

It has had the following incumbents, so far of the fitting Episcopal (lowest) rank:

- Franz Hoowaarts, Vocationists (S.D.V.) (1934.11.12 – 1946.04.11) as only Apostolic Vicar of Caozhoufu 曹州府 (China) (1934.11.12 – 1946.04.11), promoted first Bishop of Caozhou 曹州 (Tsaochowfu, China) (1946.04.11 – death 1954.03.24)
- Bernard Denis Stewart (1946.12.12 – 1950.08.18) as Coadjutor Bishop of Sandhurst (Australia) (1946.12.12 – 1950.08.18), succeeded as (first native) Bishop of Sandhurst (1950.08.18 – retired 1979.04.21); died 1988
- Antônio Batista Fragoso (1957.03.13 – 1964.04.28) as Auxiliary Bishop of São Luís do Maranhão (Brazil) (1957.03.13 – 1964.04.28), later Bishop of Crateús (Brazil) (1964.04.28 – retired 1998.02.18); died 2006
- Antulio Parrilla-Bonilla, Jesuits (S.J.) (1965.05.25 – death 1994.01.03) as Auxiliary Bishop of Caguas (Puerto Rico, US) (1965.05.25 – retired 1968) and on emeritate
- Guillermo Rodríguez Melgarejo (1994.06.25 – 2003.05.30) as Auxiliary Bishop of Buenos Aires (Argentina) (1994.06.25 – 2003.05.30); later Bishop of San Martín (Argentina) (2003.05.30 – ...)
- Edgar Moreira da Cunha, Divine Word Missionaries (S.V.D.) (2003.06.27 – 2014.07.03) as Auxiliary Bishop of Newark (New Jersey, USA) (2003.06.27 – 2014.07.03), later Bishop of Fall River (USA) (2014.07.03 – ...)
- Roy Edward Campbell (2017.03.08 – ...), Auxiliary Bishop of Washington (DC, USA) (2017.03.08 – ...).

== See also ==
- List of Catholic dioceses in Tunisia

== Sources and external links ==
- GCatholic (titular) bishopric

Bibliography

- J. Mesnage, L'Afrique chrétienne, Paris 1912, pp. 51–52
