= Avensa (Africa) =

Avensa was a Roman and Byzantine-era civitas (city), in Roman North Africa.

Medjerda river drainage basin.

It is identified as the ruins of Bordj-Hamdouna, on the Oued Medjerda valley was near the province capital Sétif and was known to be the site of a Donatist community. Mesnage identifies the seat Avensensis with that Abbenzensis mentioned by Morcelli. The town lasted from 30BC to about 640AD.

The city was also the seat of an ancient bishopric, and several of the bishop's names have been recorded. At the Conference of Carthage (411), which saw gathered together Catholic bishops and Donatists of Africa, he participated Fortunatus episcopus Abensensis plebis, who declared to have no competitors Donatists in his diocese. [1] At the time of the Vandal king Genseric (around 460) a bishop, that Victor of Vita called Sanctus Valerianus Abensae civitatis episcopus, he was exiled from his city and left the country for refusing to give in to the king, the cult objects of his Church.

- Fortunus fl. 411
- Turtullus of Avensa
- Valerius. fl. 455

The bishopric remains a titular see of the Roman Catholic Church suffragan to Carthage. The current titular bishop is Kenneth Donald Steiner of Oregon.

- Titular bishop Alfred Lanctôt, 13 Dec 1951 – 25 Mar 1953.
- Titular bishop Francis Valentine Allen 2 Jul 1954 – 7 Oct 1977
- Titular bishop Kenneth Donald Steiner 28 Nov 1977
