= Suas (see) =

Africa Proconsularis

The Diocese of Suas is an ancient suppressed and titular see of the Roman Catholic Church in North Africa. It dates from the Roman era. The bishopric was centered on the town of Chaouache in Beja.
