= Macriana maior =

Africa Proconsularis

Macriana maior is an ancient suppressed and titular see of the Roman Catholic Church in North Africa. It dates back to the Roman era but survives as a titular see of the Roman Catholic Church. The current bishop is Antony Kariyil, the Episcopal Vicar of the Major Archbishop for Ernakulam Angamaly of the Syro-Malabars. Other modern bishops have included Mar Sebastian Adayantharath and Julijans Vaivods.
