= Thunusruma =

Africa Proconsularis (125 AD)

Thunusruma (Tunudruma) was a Roman–Berber civitas (town) in the province of Africa Proconsularis. Its exact location is uncertain, but it must have been somewhere in northern Tunisia.

In antiquity, the town was also the seat of a Christian diocese, suffragan of the Archdiocese of Carthage.

Only one bishop of this diocese is known, Ottaviano, who intervened at the Council of Carthage (525). Tunudruma is now a titular bishopric of the Roman Catholic Church and the current bishop is Josef Hrdlička of Olomouc.
