= Avitta Bibba =

Coordinates: 36.4090°N 9.7060°E

Africa Proconsularis (125 AD).

Avitta Bibba was a town in the Roman province of Africa Proconsularis. The town is tentatively identified with ruins at Henchir-Bour-Aouitta in Tunisia.

== Bishopric ==
As a bishopric, Avitta Bibba was a suffragan of the metropolitan see of Carthage. This may have been the see of the bishop Tertullus (Tertullus Abitensis) who took part in a council held at Cabarsussi in 393 by a breakaway group of Donatists led by Maximianus, and of the bishop Honoratus ("Honoratus Abiddensis") who at the Conference of Carthage (411) between Catholic and Donatist bishops, declared he had no Donatist counterpart in his diocese. However, the see to which one or both of these bishops belonged may instead have been Abidda in the Roman province of Byzacena.

No longer a residential bishopric, Avitta Bibba is today listed by the Catholic Church as a titular see.

== See also ==
- Catholic Church in Tunisia
