= Diocese of Torreblanda =

Roman Catholic titular see

The Diocese of Torreblanda (Latin: Dioecesis Turreblandensis) was a Roman Catholic diocese in ancient Byzacena.

== History ==
Torreblanda was an ancient episcopal seat of the Roman province of Byzacena in Tunisia. The diocese ceased to effectively function with the Muslim conquest of the Maghreb but the diocese was in name at least reborn in the 1930s as a titular see.

There are five bishops attributed to this diocese.

- The Donatist bishop Massimino who attended the Councils of Carthage of 411, which brought together the Catholic and Donatist bishops of Roman Africa; on that occasion the town did not have the Catholic bishop.
- Paul took part in the synod gathered in Carthage by the Vandal king Huneric in 484, after which he was exiled.
- Daziano participated in the antimonotelite council of 641.
- Jan Pietraszko (1962 - 1988)
- Jan Szkodoń, from May 14, 1988
