= Paria in Proconsulari =

Ancient Roman African town

Paria in Proconsulari is an Ancient town and former bishopric in Roman Africa and now a Latin titular see of the Roman Catholic Church.

== History ==
The diocese (in Latin Rite Pariensis in Proconsulari) was founded in late antiquity in a town of what was then Roman province of Africa Proconsularis. The actual town it was established in, was presumably called Pariah, though its actual location has been lost to us. Despite this it is presumed to be in modern Tunisia.

Paria was a suffragan of the Archdiocese of Carthage, in the papal sway. Only one bishop of this African diocese is historically recorded : Felix, an attendee at the Council of Carthage (646), called against the heresy Monothelitism.

== Titular see ==
The diocese was nominally restored in 1989 as Latin Titular bishopric of Paria in Proconsolare (Latine / Paria di Proconsolare (Curiate Italian) / Parien(sis) in Proconsulari (Latin adjective).

It has had the following incumbents, so far of the fitting Episcopal (lowest) rank :

BIOS to ELABORATE

- Edward Peter Cullen (1994.02.08 – 1997.12.16)
- Jean-Paul Randriamanana (1999.06.03 – 2011.11.09)
- Joselito Carreño Quiñonez, Yarumal Society for the Foreign Missions (M.X.Y.), Apostolic Vicar of Inírida (Colombia).

== See also ==
- List of Catholic dioceses in Tunisia
