= Sebarga =

- Parish

- Location within Asturias Location within Spain
- Coordinates: 43°16′N 5°10′W
- Country: Spain
- Autonomous community: Asturias
- Province: Asturias
- Municipality: Amieva

Area
  - Total: 26.19 km^{2} (10.11 sq mi)

Population (2024)
  - Total: 144
  - Density: 5.50/km^{2} (14.2/sq mi)
- Postal code: 33557

Sebarga is a parish in Amieva, a municipality within the province and autonomous community of Asturias, in northern Spain.

It is 26.19 km^{2} (10.11 sq mi) in size. The population as of 2024 is 144. The postal code is 33557.

== Villages ==
The following villages fall under the Sebarga parish:

- Arnañu
- Berducéu
- El Camperón
- Cirieñu
- Enu
- La Mollera
- Pen
- Les Polvoroses
- Santolaya
- Santoveña
- Siña
- La Vega de Sebarga
- Villanueva
- Villaverde
