= Tigimma =

Titular see in Tunisia

Africa Proconsularis (125 AD)

Tigimma was during the Roman Empire a civitas of Africa Proconsularis. The town has been tentatively identified with ruins near Djemâa.

The town was also the seat of an ancient Christian bishopric Which survives today as a titular see of the Roman Catholic Church. and the current bishop is Stanislaw Dowlaszewicz, who replaced Luciano Storero in 2000.
