= Sululos =

Africa Proconsularis (125 AD)

Sululos was a Roman era Municipium of the Roman province of Africa Proconsularis that flourished from which flourished from 30 BC - AD 640. The ancient town was officially known as Municipium Septimium Aurelium Severianum Apollinare Sululitanum and is tentatively identified with ruins at Bir-el-Heuch, (Bir-el-Ach) 36.461372, 9.605158 in what is today Tunisia.

The town was in the region of the Merjerda (Bagrada) and Oued Miliane rivers and, 4 km north of Djebel Riban, 35 km east of Dougga and 60 km soüthwest of Tunis.

== History ==
We know that in 168AD the city is still a civitas (town) but under Septimius Severus and Caracalla it had been raised to a municipium status.

Babelon records an aqueduct with a source in the South-Vedic area near Ain Sense, a temple and a bridge, later converted into a fortress. 6 kilometres north of the ruins of Bir-el-Ach, was found a Base for statue of Valentinian I (364–375) now on display at the Bardo Museum.

The town was also the seat of an ancient Christian bishopric, and one bishop is known to have attended the Council of Carthage (411). The diocese effectively ceased to function with the Muslim conquest of the Maghreb but was re-established in 1927 as a titular bishopric of the Roman Catholic Church. The current bishop is John Baptist Tseng Chien-tsi.
