= Lapda =

Africa Proconsularis (125 AD)

Lapda, was a civitas (town) of the Roman province of Africa Proconsularis. Its exact location is now lost to history, though probably somewhere in central modern Tunisia. Also known as Labdia.

Lapda was also the seat of an ancient Christian episcopal see, suffragan to the Archdiocese of Carthage.

There are three bishops of antiquity mentioned by the historical sources.

- The Donatist bishop Rufino attended the Conference of Carthage (411). The diocese had no Catholic counterpart.
- Jona was present at the Synod of Carthage (484) called by the Vandal king Huneric.
- Victor witnessed the document of doctrine following the Council of Carthage (525) held by Metropolitan Bonifacio.

Today Lapda survives as a titular bishopric and the current bishop is José Mauricio Vélez García, of Medellín.
