= Sutunura =

Roman era civitas

Africa Proconsularis (125 AD)

Sutunura was a Roman era civitas in the Roman province of Africa and is tentatively identified with ruins near Aïn-El-Askerm, Rdir-Es-Soltan in modern Tunisia.(36° 34' 29" north, 9°59'29" east) 50 km from Carthage. The location being confirmed with inscription remains in situ and is nearby to Koudiat es Somra, Jebel Barrou and Ghedir Soltane.

== History ==
Sutunurca goes back to a Libyan foundation. This hypothesis is underpinned not only by the name itself but also by a tumulus close to Djebel Barrou. Probably Sutunurca belonged to the area of the veteran colony Uthina.

Even under Septimius Severus, Sutunurca was still a civitas.

When Africa Proconsularis was divided in the late empire, Sutunura found itself in the new province of Zeugitana.

== Remains ==
Babelon mentions a multitude of ruins and counts architectural elements as well as inscriptions to the finds. He also mentions the remains of a Byzantine fortress. Jaidi has dealt with the hydraulic systems of the ancient city. Antique buildings have also been preserved at N'faïedh, but Maurin emphasized in 1989 that only a small part was visible.

== Bishopric ==
In antiquity, Sutunura was the seat of an ancient Christian bishopric, suffragan of the Archdiocese of Carthage. we know only one bishop of Sutunura, Repositus, who took part at the Council of Carthage (256) convoked by St. Cyprian to address the problem of the Lapsi. Morcelli mistakenly attributes Repositus as the bishop of Tuburnica.

The Diocese of Sutunurca (in Latin Rite Sutunurcensis) survives today as a home, suppressed and titular bishopric of the Roman Catholic Church. The current bishop is Léopold Ouédraogo, of Ouagadougou.
