= Cefala =

Cefala was a Roman–Berber civitas (town) in the province of Africa Proconsularis. It is tentatively identified with the stone ruins near Ras El Djebel, Tunisia.

The town was also the seat of an ancient Catholic bishopric. The diocese is now a titular see of the Roman Catholic Church. The current bishop is Petr Esterka of Brno.

== See also ==
- Roman Catholic Diocese of Cefalù, Sicily
