= Absa Salla =

Roman North Africa.

Absa Salla was a Roman and Byzantine-era town in the Roman province of Africa proconsularis (today northern Tunisia). It was also the seat of a titular see of the Roman Catholic Church. with the same name. The location of the town remains unknown but is known to have existed for certain between 300 and 650AD.

== Bishopric ==
The town was also the seat of an ancient bishopric in the ecclesiastical province of Carthage. From this former bishopric only one bishop is known, Dominic, who took part in the African council of 646 and signed a letter to the Patriarch of Constantinople Paul, and which was later read during the Synod called by Pope Martin I in 649.

The diocese effectively ceased to function at the end of the 7th century with the arrival of the Islamic armies, however the diocese was refunded in name in 1933, Established as a Titular Episcopal. Today Absasalla survives as titular bishopric and the current is bishop Christopher Glancy Auxiliary Bishop of Belize City–Belmopan.

Known Bishops

- Dominic fl646.
- Domenico Ferrara MCCJ Apostolic Vicar of Mupio (Sudan) March 15, 1966 to 21 September 1998
- Lawrence Pius Dorairaj Auxiliary Bishop in Madras-Mylapore (India) 28 November 1998 to January 13, 2012
- Christopher Glancy Auxiliary Bishop in Belize City-Belmopan (Belize) February 18, 2012
