= Gisipa =

Titular see in Tunisia

Africa Proconsularis (125 AD)

The Diocese of Gisipa (Latin: Rite Gisipensis) is a home suppressed and titular see of the Roman Catholic Church, suffragan of the Archdiocese of Carthage.

== Location ==
The bishopric of Gisipa, was centered on a Roman town called Gisipam, the location of which is now lost to history, although being in Africa Proconsularis it is certain that it was in what is modern north Tunisia.

== History ==
The sources mention four bishops.

- The Catholic bishop, Gennaro attended the Council of Carthage (411)
- Carissimo took part in the Synod of Carthage in 484 called by the Vandal king Huneric, after which Carissimo was exiled
- Redento attended the Council of Carthage (525)
- Melloso signed the anti-monothelitism canon of 646.

Today Gisipa survives as titular bishop, the current bishop is Vitorino José Pereira Soares, Auxiliary Bishop of Porto.
