= Sidi Ahmed Djedidi =

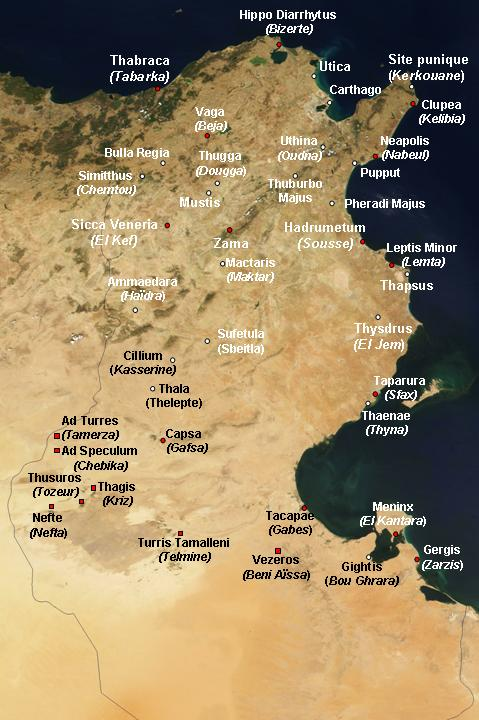
Map showing town in Roman North Africa.

Sidi Ahmed Djedidi is a town and hill near Hammamet, Tunisia, 64 Kilometers south of Tunis. It is located at 36.4n and 10.4e.

During the Roman Empire the town was known as Elephantaria and was a civitas of the Africa Proconsularis. The city at that time was the seat of an ancient Christian Bishopric, which survives today as a titular see of the Roman Catholic Church.
