= Utimma =

Africa Proconsularis (125 AD)

Utimma was an ancient city in the Roman province of Africa Proconsularis (now northern Tunisia ) during the Byzantine and Roman Empires. the exact location of Utimma is lost to history but it is believed to be between Sidi Medien and Henchir-Reoucha in Tunisia.

The town of Utimma was also the home of a suppressed and titular see of the Roman Catholic Church. There are two known bishops of this diocese both attendee at the Council of Carthage (411), the Catholic Ottavio and Donatist Bonifacio. Today Utimma survives as a titular bishopric, the current bishop is Theodorus van Ruijven.
