= Sebkha-El-Coursia =

Sebkha-El-Coursia is a salt pan, locality and archaeological site in Tunisia. It was an ancient Roman Catholic diocese.

== History ==
During antiquity the city was a civitas of the Roman province of Africa Proconsularis called Giufi Salaria.

During the Byzantine and Roman Empires, Sebkha-El-Coursia was also the seat of an ancient Christian episcopal see, suffragan to the Archdiocese of Carthage. Only two bishops of Giufi Salaria are known. Procolo a catholic attended the Council of Carthage (411), and Bennato who participated in the anti-monothetalism Council of Carthage (646).

Today Giufi Salaria survives as titular bishopric and the current bishop is Herman Willebrordus Woorts, of Utrecht.
