= Cerbali =

Africa Proconsularis (125 AD)

Cerbali is a titular bishopric of the Roman Catholic Church.

It was originally a bishopric in the Roman province of Africa Proconsularis and then Zeugitana in late antiquity. The city on which it was based remains unknown but it must have been in today's northern Tunisia as it belonged to the church province of Carthage

Known Bishops include:

- Bishop John Brendan McCormack (1995–1998)
- Archbishop Ramón Benito de La Rosa y Carpio (1988–1995)
- Bishop Cesar C. Raval, (1981–1988)
- Bishop Reginald Edward Vincent Arliss (1969–1981)
- Bishop Joseph Aloysius Durick (1954–1969)
- Bishop Giovanni Battista Cesana (1950–1953)
