= Taddua =

Town in the Roman province of Africa

The city of Taddua(Tadduensis) was an ancient town of the Roman Empire located in the Roman province of Africa Proconsular. Today the exact location of the town is uncertain but it is in Tunisia.

In antiquity Taddua was also the seat of a historic diocese of the Roman Catholic Church, a suffragan of the metropolis of Carthage. The titular bishopric was recreated in name in 1989 when it was made a titular bishopric of the Roman Catholic Church. Since 2004 Jan Zajac of Kraków has been Bishop of Tadduy.
