= Henchir-Belli =

Henchir-Belli, also known as Beled Belli, is a location and archaeological site in Tunisia.

== History ==
Africa Proconsularis (125 AD)

Known as Belali it was a Roman-era civitas in the Roman province of Africa Proconsularis. Column ruins of an ancient temple/church are still found in situ.

The ancient city was also the seat of an ancient bishopric, in the ecclesiastical province of Carthage. The only known bishop from antiquity is Adeodato (fl.411). The bishopric survives today as a titular see of the Roman Catholic Church, Carlos Alberto de Pinho Moreira Azevedo being bishop since 2004.
