= Pisita =

Pisita was an ancient city and bishopric in Tunisia. It is now a Latin Catholic titular see.

== History ==
Pisita was a city in the Roman province of Africa Proconsularis. Its ruins are presumably at Bou-Chateur-Sidi-Mansour, in modern Tunisia.

Pisita was also a Catholic diocese, whose bishop was a suffragan of the Metropolitan of Carthage.

== Titular see ==
The diocese was nominally revived in 1933 as a Latin titular bishopric of the lowest (episcopal) rank, which since had these, near-consecutive incumbents:

- Giovanni C. Luigi Marinoni, Capuchin Franciscans (O.F.M. Cap.) (1936.07.21 – 1961.08.12) (later Archbishop)
- Yves Ramousse, Paris Foreign Missions Society (M.E.P.) (1962.11.12 – 2021.02.25), Vicar Apostolic emeritus of Phnom Penh (Cambodia)
- Guillaume Leschallier de Lisle, auxiliary bishop of Meaux (2021.10.15 - ).
