= Theudalis =

Theudalis, also known as Teudali, was a Roman era civitas (town) of the Roman province of Africa Proconsularis. The ancient city is tentatively identifiable with ruins at Henchir-Aouam in Tunisia.

Teudali was the seat of an ancient episcopal see suffragan of the Archdiocese of Carthage. Three bishops are documented from Teudali.

- The Catholic Bishop Urban Council of Carthage (411) (at the time, the Teudali had no Donatist bishops).
- Habetdeus exiled by the Vandal king Genseric in 457, as recalled by Victor Vitensis in his History of the Vandal Persecution;
- Habetdeus' name appears in the Roman martyrology on the date of 28 November. Finally, Victor took part in the Council of Carthage (484) called by the Vandal king Huneric, after which he too was exiled.

Today, Teudali survives as a titular bishopric. The current titular bishop is José María Baliña of Buenos Aires, Argentina.
