= Henchir-Bel-Aït =

Tunisian locality and archaeological site

Africa Proconsularis (125 AD)

Henchir-Bel-Aït is a locality and archaeological site in Tunisia.

The ruins are of the Roman era civitas of Tepela. The ruins include several columaide temples.

The town of Tepela was also the seat of a small Roman Bishopric, which survives today as a titular Bishopric of the Roman Catholic Church, and the current bishop is Alexandre Palma.
