= Henchir-Bez =

Tunisian archaeological site

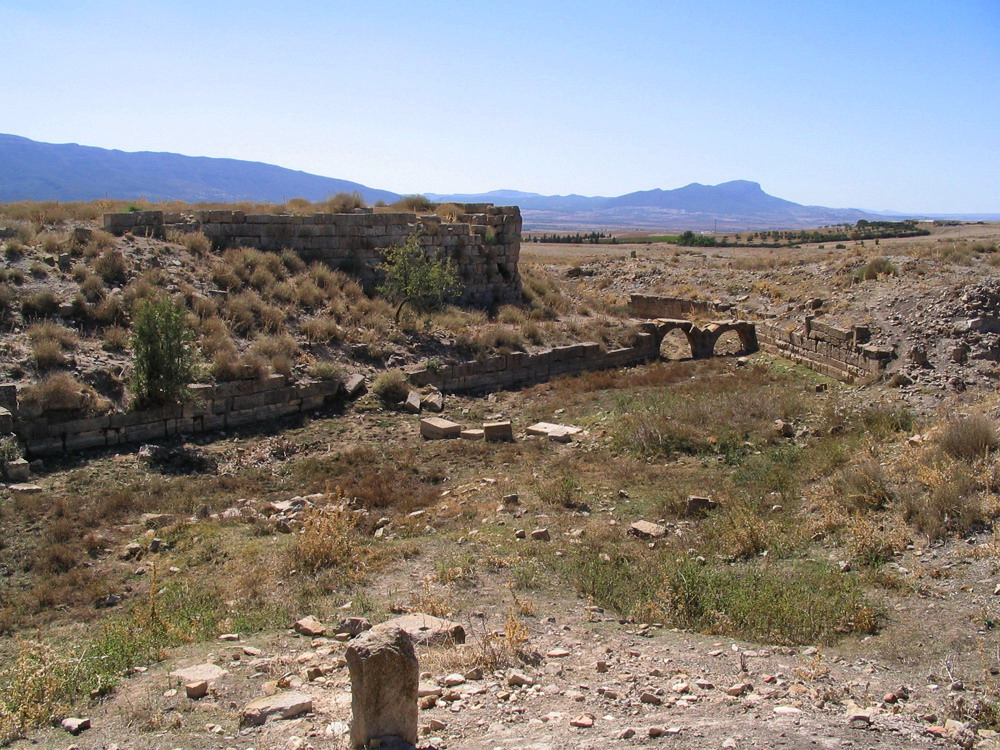
Vazi Sarra, Tunisia.

Henchir Bez is an archaeological site in Tunisia, located at 36° 00′ 23″ N, 9° 32 in the hills overlooking the Oued Miliane river, west of Tunis. Identified by a recently discovered inscription, it is the ruins of the Roman civitas of Vazi Sarra, which include a Christian Basilica and a Byzantine/Roman fort.

== Ruins ==
The ruins at Henchir Bez have been identified as the remains of Vazitana Sarra Civitas (Vazi Sarara), a civitas of the Roman province of Africa Proconsularis. The remains at Henchir Bez include a Bascilica and a fort. The fort was originally a temple dedicated to Mercury Soberus.

== Etymology ==
The name Henchir Bez means the "ruins of Bez" where 'bez' probably derives from the ancient "Vaz[i]" through linguistic fortition. The name Vazitana Sarra Civitas is supported by recent epigraphical finds

== Bishopric ==
The ancient Roman town of Vazi-Sarra was also the seat of an ancient Catholic Bishopric. It existed until the Muslim conquest of the Maghreb, and is now a titular see of the Roman Catholic Church.

Another ancient Bishopric, Marcelliana, was located nearby. However, its exact location is unknown.
