= Apisa Maius =

Africa Proconsularis.

Apisa Maius is a former Roman-Berber city and present Latin Catholic titular bishopric.

== History ==
Apisa Maius was an Ancient city in the Roman province of Africa Proconsularis.

It was a bishopric, suffragan to the Metropolitan of Carthage.

Its ruins are at Tarf-Ech-Chena, in modern Tunisia.

== Titular see ==
In 1933, the diocese was nominally revived as a titular see of the lowest (episcopal) rank.

So far, it had the following consecutive incumbents, all members of Latin congregations:

- Johannes Theodor Suhr, Benedictines (O.S.B.) (1964.10.06 – 1976.06.16)
- Lorenzo Miccheli Filippetti, Augustinians (O.S.A.) (1976.08.12 – 1978.01.17)
- Julio Terrazas Sandoval, Redemptorists (C.SS.R.) (later Cardinal) (1978.04.15 – 1982.01.09)
- Josephus Tethool, Missionaries of the Sacred Heart of Jesus (M.S.C.) (1982.04.02 – 2010.01.18)
- Charles Mahuza Yava, Salesians (S.D.S.), Bishop-emeritus of Ambanja, Apostolic Vicar of Apostolic Vicariate of the Comoros Archipelago (2010.05.01 – ...)
