= Simingi =

Africa Proconsularis (125 AD)

Simingi was a Roman era civitas (town) of the Roman province of Africa Proconsularis.

The town was the seat of an ancient bishopric, suffragan of the Archdiocese of Carthage. Only two bishops of this diocese are documented.

- Catholic bishop Restitutus, who attended the Council of Carthage (411) at that time the seat had no Donatist bishops.
- Cresconio witnessed the Council of Carthage (525).

In modern times Simingi became a titular bishopric. Simingi's bishop is Josef Holtkotte of Paderborn, Germany.
