= Bonusta =

Africa Proconsularis (125 AD).

Bonusta was a town, not far from Carthage, in the Roman province of Africa Proconsularis. No trace of it has been identified.

== Bishop Rufinianus ==
At the Conference of Carthage (411), which brought together for joint discussion the Catholic and Donatist bishops of Roman Africa, Bonusta was represented by the Catholic bishop Rufinianus. He declared that there never been Donatists at Bonusta. Primianus, a Donatist, responded: "He (Rufinianus) was one of us. We do have people there for whom we could ordain a bishop." Rufinianus retorted: "There never were."

== Bishop Cyprianus ==
In the Notitia Provinciarum et Civitatum Africae, the name of Bishop Cyprianus of Bonusta appears in the 31st place in the list of Catholic bishops of Africa Proconsularis whom the Vandal king Huneric summoned to Carthage in 484 and then exiled.

== Titular see ==
No longer a residential bishopric, Bonusta is today listed by the Catholic Church as a titular see.
