= Agbia =

Coordinates: 36.3931°N 9.2284°E

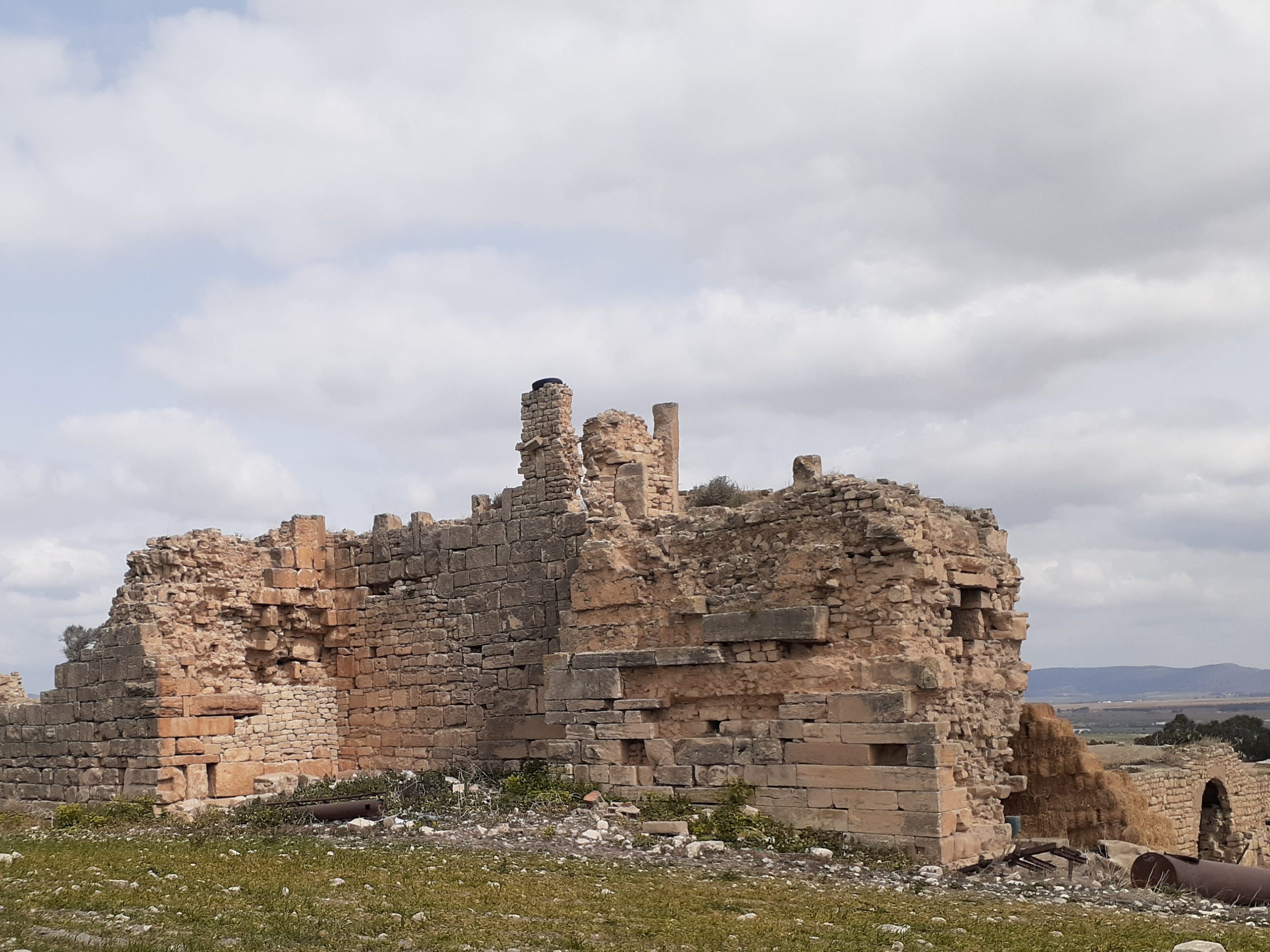
Remains of a Château

Agbia was an ancient city and diocese in the Roman province of Africa Proconsularis. It is currently a Roman Rite Catholic titular see.

== Antiquity ==
Agbia was located at the site of modern Aïn-Hedia in Tunisia.

It had a bishop, who was suffragan to the Metropolitan Archbishop of Carthage.

== Titular see ==
The bishopric was nominally revived in 1916 as a titular see of the lowest (episcopal) rank in 1916, and has several, near-consecutive incumbents, but underwent name changes of the see during the first incumbency: Agae > (1925) > Aga > (1933) Agbia

- Michele Godlewski (later Archbishop) (1916.10.21 – 1949.01.14)
- Inácio João Dal Monte, O.F.M. Cap. (1949.03.15 – 1952.05.21)
- Alfonso Zaplana Bellizza (1952.07.14 – 1957.12.17)
- Bartholomew Kim Hyeon-bae (김현배 바르톨로메오) (1957.01.26 – 1960.04.30)
- Leo Lemay, S.M. (1960.06.14 – 1966.11.15)
- António Valente da Fonseca (1967.01.10 – 1971.01.27)
- Jakob Mayr (1971.03.12 – 2010.09.19)
- Pedro Cunha Cruz (51) (2010.11.24 – 2015.05.20)
- Uriah Ashley (2015.06.25 – ...), Auxiliary Bishop of Panama

== Source and external link ==
- GigaCatholic, with incumbent biography links
