= Cubda =

Ancient city in Tunisia

Africa Proconsularis (125 AD)

Cubda was an ancient city in Tunisia. It is a titular bishopric of the Roman Catholic Church.

The town was an ancient bishopric, centered in an unknown city, probably of the same name. It was situated in the Roman province of Africa Proconsularis, now northern Tunisia.

== History ==
The church records tell of only 2 known bishops of this diocese.

- Thomas, a Catholic bishop at the Council of Carthage (411), (no Donatists bishops represented the town).
- Gentile at the antimonotelita Council of Carthage (646).

Cubda survives today as a titular bishopric of the Roman Catholic Church, and the current bishop is Efraín Mendoza Cruz, of Mexico, who replaced José María Izuzquiza Herranz in 2011.
