= Vartana =

Africa Proconsularis (125 AD)

Vartana (Vertare[n]sis) was a Roman-Berber town in Byzacena, Africa Proconsulare. It is identified with stone ruins in the area of Srâa-Ouartane, Tunisia.

== Bishopric ==
The city of Vartana (also known as Vertara) was also the seat of an ancient Catholic diocese. Only one bishop is known to us from antiquity. Since 1933 the diocese has been reestablished in name at least and a bishop has been appointed there ever since.

Bishop Vetalis is recorded as attendee to a Church Council in 314.

Bishop Leo Hale Taylor became the first of the new bishops on February 26, 1934. The current bishop is Giovanni Moretti (9 Sep 1971 Appointed - ), who succeeded bishop Carlo Minchiatt (1969 - 1971).
