= Bilta =

Bilta Baltha, Bilthensis
- Henchir Bahaia
- Location within Tunisia
- Country: Tunisia
- Time zone: UTC+1 (CET)

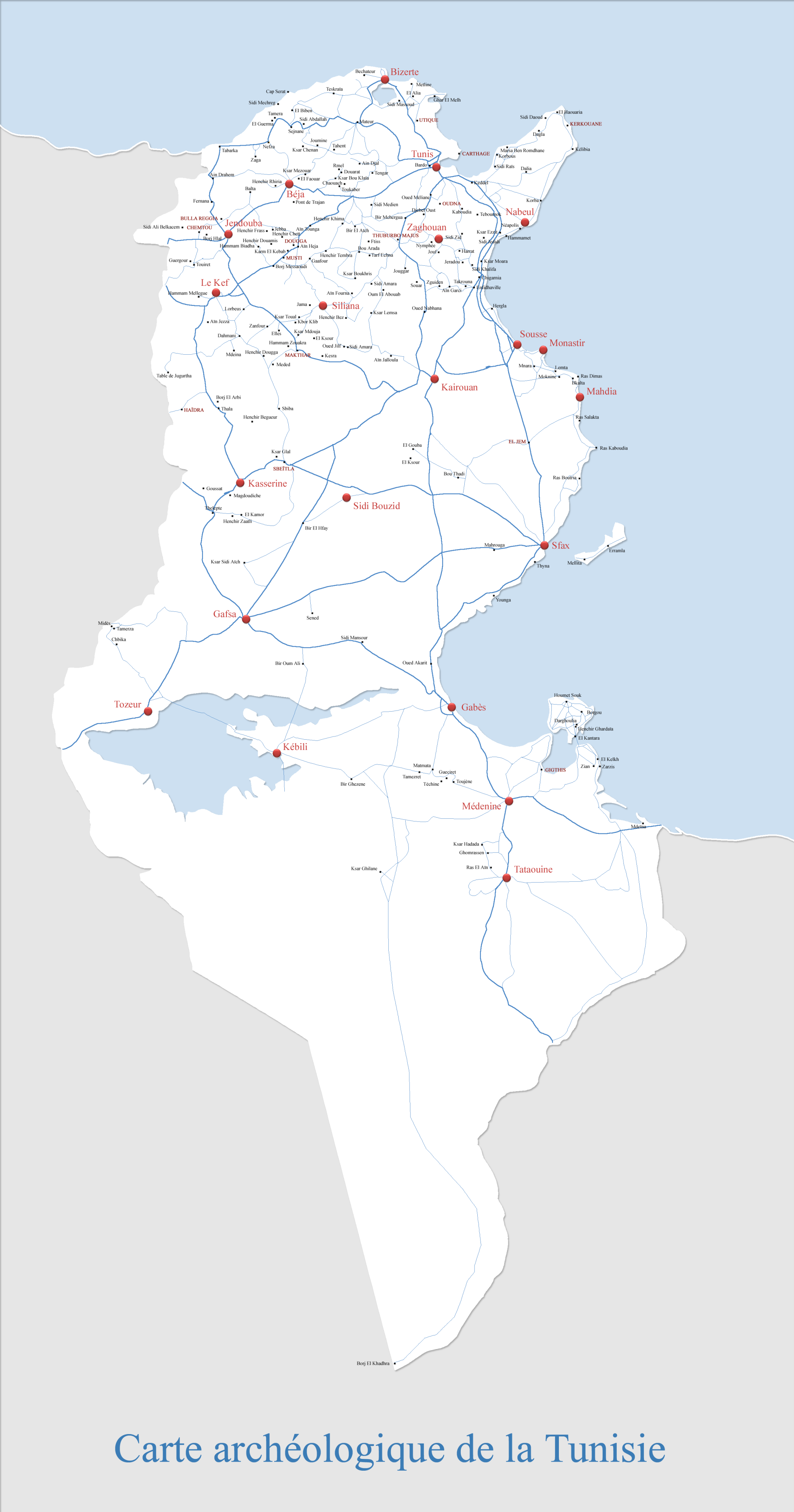
Archaeology map of Tunisia

Bilta also known as Balta or Balţah, is an antique town in northern Tunisia, close to Mateur in today's Bizerte governorate. Its name comes from the Numidian language (Lybico-Berber) root BLT, meaning, filled with water.

An inscription in the nearby fundus Aufidianus contains the name of the place: Agricolae in spl(endida) (vel spl(endidissima)/re p(ublica) Bihensi Bilt[a](vel Belt[a]).

During Vandal and Byzantine times, bishops are attested: in 256 AD, a Caecilius is episcopus in Bilta (or Biltha, or Belta), in 411, a donatist named Felicianus is in Viltensis and in 646, a bishop Theodorus in Biltensis signs a letter sent to the Lateran Council of 649.

The town is a titular see of the Roman Catholic church.

It is not to be mistaken for the modern town of Balta-Bou Aouene in the Jendouba governorate.
