= Tabbora =

Titular see in Tunisia

Tabbora was a town in the late Roman province of Africa Proconsularis. The Catholic diocese that had its seat there was a suffragan of Carthage, the capital of the province.

== Location ==
Tabbora is believed to have been situated in the vicinity of the stone ruins at Tembra, located west of Bijga (ancient Bisica) in the valley of Wadi Siliana, Tunisia.

== Bishops ==
Two bishops are known:

- Marinus, present at the Conference of Carthage (411), where his rival was Victor, also rival of the Bishop of Bisica;
- Constantine, who signed the letter from the bishops of the province to Patriarch Paul II of Constantinople, against the Monothelites (646).

No longer a residential see, Tabbora is included in the Catholic Church's list of titular sees.
