= Buslacena =

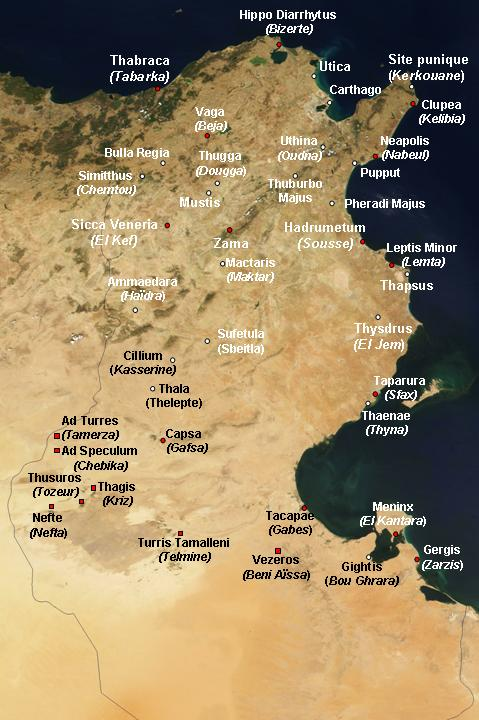
Map showing Buslacena

Buslacena was a Roman town and the seat of an ancient Christian bishopric in the Roman province of Africa Proconsularis.

== Bishopric ==
We know of only one bishop of the town, Felix, who attended the Council of Carthage (256) to discuss the issue of the Lapsi. The bishopric survives to day as a titular see of the Roman Catholic Church with only one modern bishop, Alfredo Victor Petit Vergel.
