= Zarna (Africa) =

Roman town of the Roman Empire during late antiquity

Africa Proconsularis (125 AD)

Zarna was a Roman town of the Roman Empire during late antiquity. An exact location for the town has been lost to history, although that it was in the Roman province of Africa Proconsolare means it must have been in northern Tunisia.

In antiquity the town was also the seat of a Christian bishopric, suffragan of the Archdiocese of Carthage. Only one bishop of this diocese is documented Vitale, who took part in the antimonotelita Council of Carthage of 646.

Today Zarna survives as a titular bishopric of the Roman Catholic Church and the current bishop is Francisco Antonio Ceballos Escobar of Puerto Carreño. who replaced Edmar Peron in 2016.
