= Thuccabora =

Coordinates: 36.45°N 8.66°E

Touccabeur, known in ancient times as Thuccabora, is a railway town and archaeological site in northern Tunisia. It is located in the Medjerda valley, outside of Bou Salem. Touccabeur is located in the Medjerda valley at 36.45N, 8.66E, outside of Bou Salem.

In antiquity, Thuccabora was a Roman–Berber civitas in the province of Africa Proconsularis. The stone ruins of the city lie near the modern town, and include inscriptions from the reign of Commodus.

Inscriptions from the reign of Commodus. During the Roman Empire Thuccabora was the seat of an ancient bishopric which survives today as a titular see of the Roman Catholic Church.
