= Henchir-Aïn-Dourat =

Former Roman Berber civitas and archaeological site in Tunisia

Africa Proconsularis (125 AD)

Henchir-Aïn-Dourat, also known as Ad-Duwayrat or Henchir Durat, is a former Roman–Berber civitas and archaeological site in Tunisia. It is located at 36.767496n, 9.524142e, in the hills just north of Toukabeur and 15.3 km (9.5 mi) from Majāz al Bāb. It was an ancient Catholic diocese.

== History ==
The ruins have been identified as the remains of Uccula a municipium of the province of Africa Proconsularis during the Roman Empire, and which was active from 330 BC – AD 640. The ruins at Henchir-Aïn-Dourat have been surveyed, and include a statue of mars. An inscription in the ruins honors Constantine as "beyond the other emperors" and "unconquered". and another earlier in its history honours Divus Titus.

Before the Romans the town was in the tribal area of the Afri, a Berber confederation.

The civitas was also the seat of an ancient Christian bishopric, which survives today as a titular see of the Roman Catholic Church.
