= Abziri =

- Abziritanus
- Location within Tunisia
- 36°36′30″N 10°10′18″E
- Type: town
- Location: Tunisia
- Region: Ben Arous Governorate

Abziri also known variously as Abziritanus and Abdiritanus was a Roman and Byzantine era oppidum (town) in Africa Proconsularis, Roman North Africa. The town is tentatively identified with ruins near Oudna, in Cartagine, Tunisia.

== History ==
The town was mentioned by Pliny and was one of the 30 oppida libera in Africa Proconsularis. The town appears to be a native Berber town associated with the nearby Roman colony of Uthina.

== Bishopric ==
The town was the seat of an ancient Catholic bishopric which functioned till the end of the 7th century and the arrival of Islamic Armies. The diocese was refounded in name in 1933, and exists today as a titular see in the Roman Catholic Church.

- Victor (Catholic Bishop) fl. 390
- Fructuosus Abziritanus fl. 411
- Emilio Abascal y Salmerón (Mexico) July 25, 1953 – April 18, 1968
- Giuseppe Obert (Bangladesh) September 5, 1968 – March 6, 1972
- Vinzenz Guggenberger (Germany) May 17, 1972 – July 4, 2012
- Kęstutis Kėvalas (Lithuania) September 27, 2012
- Hansjörg Hofer (Austria) May 31, 2017
