= Henchir-Madjouba =

Africa Proconsularis (125 AD).

Henchir-Madjouba is a locality and archaeological site, near the headwaters of the Medjerda River in Tunisia, North Africa. It is located at 8.50238n, 35.80905e. The site is tentatively identified with the ruins of the Roman era town of Tituli, which was a civitas of the Roman Province of Roman North Africa.
