= Saia Maior =

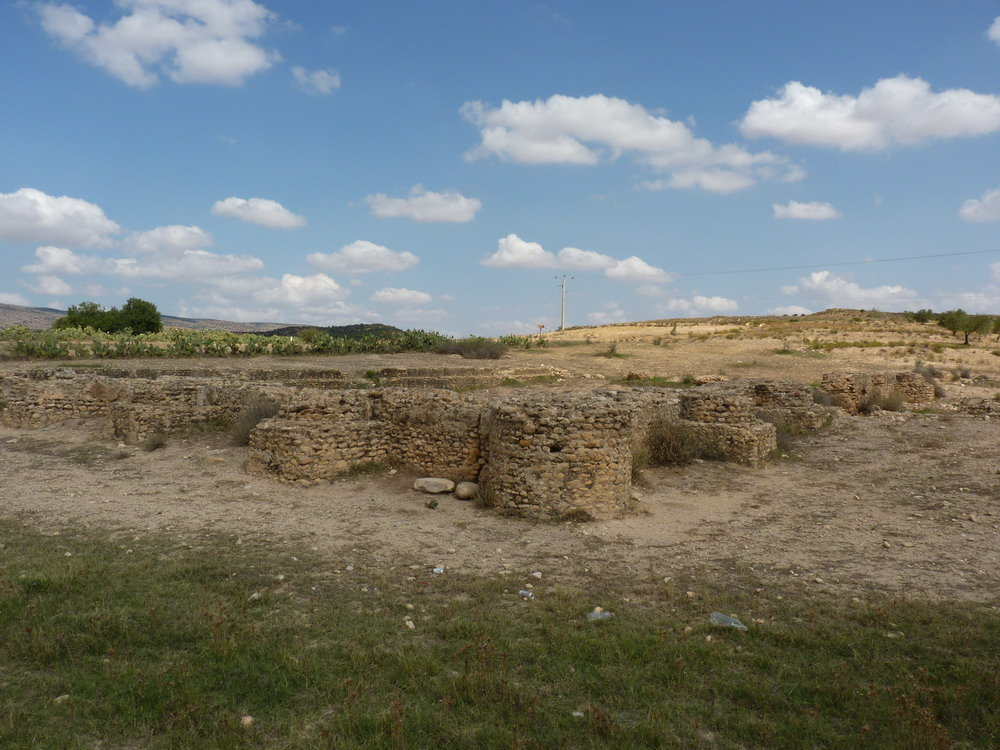
Ruins at Saia Maior

Saia Maior also known as Saia Maggiore was a Roman era civitas of the Roman province of Africa Proconsularis.

The ancient city is tentatively identified with ruins at Henchir-Simidia, Tunisia

The city was also the seat of an ancient bishopric, suffragan of the Archdiocese of Carthage. Only two documented bishops Saia Maggiore are known. The Catholic Donato intervened at the Council of Carthage (411), at that time the seat had no Donatist bishops.

Another bishop named Donato has lived at the time of Pope Leo I, and is mentioned in his letters. Today Saia Major survives as a titular bishopric and the current bishop is Antonio Bonifacio Reimann Panic.
