= Thacia Montana =

Thacia Montana is a titular see in Africa Proconsularis, suffragan of Carthage. It was located between Carthage and Theveste, in modern Tunisia.
