= Uzzipari =

Africa Proconsularis (125 AD)

Uzzipari was a Roman town of the Roman Empire during late antiquity. An exact location for the town has been lost to history although that it was in the Roman province of Africa Proconsolaris means it must have been in northern Tunisia.

In antiquity the town was also the seat of a Christian bishopric, suffragan of the Archdiocese of Carthage.

There are three documented bishops of this diocese.

- the Catholic Bishop Mariano attended the Council of Carthage 411, and participated in another council of Carthage in 419.
- Augenzio who attended the synod in Carthage called by the Vandal king Huneric in 484, after which Augenzio was exiled.
- Semenzio took part in the Carthaginian council of 525.

Today Uzzipari survives as a titular bishopric of the Roman Catholic Church and the current Bishop is Thomas Chakiath of Ernakulam-Angamaly.
