= Sinna =

Africa Proconsularis (125 AD)

Sinna was a Roman era civitas of the Roman province of Africa Proconsularis.

This ancient city is tentatively identified with ruins at Calaat-Es-Senan in modern Tunisia.

The ancient town was also the seat of a Christian bishopric (in Latin Rite Sinnensis) suffragan of the Archdiocese of Carthage. The only bishop known of this diocese is Victor, who attended the Council of Constantinople in 553. Sinna survives today as a titular bishopric. Its current bishop is Arūnas Poniškaitis of Vilnius.
