= List of palaces and fortifications in Sudan =

This a list of castles, fortifications located in Sudan.

Castle or Fortification	Location	Date	Image
Semna West Fort	Wadi Halfa	1965–1920 BCE	
Buhen	Northern State	1860 BCE	
Gala Abu Ahmed	Wadi Howar	1100-750 BCE	
Throne Hall of Dongola	Old Dongola	9th century	
Umm Marrahi fort	Khartoum State	6th century	
Hosh el-Kab fort	Khartoum State	6th century	
Abu Nafisa fort	Khartoum State	6th century	
Askut		13th century	
Palace of Sennar	Sennar State	19th century	
Republican Palace	Khartoum	19th century	

== See also ==
- List of palaces
- List of castles in Africa
- History of Sudan
- List of castles
- List of forts
