= Vageata =

Roman-Berber town in Mauretania Caesariensis, Roman Empire

Vageata, also known as Vageatensis, was a Roman-Berber town in the province of Mauretania Caesariensis. It is also known as Bagatensis, and epigraphical evidence remains attesting to this etymology, due to the interchange of 'v' for 'b' is a common phenomenon in Latin and Greek place names.

The city has been identified with ruins at El-Haria, located east of Cirta en route to Thibilis. It was mentioned by Optatus of Milevis, in Numidia.

== Bishopric ==
The city was also a seat of an ancient bishopric though only two bishops are known to history. Donatus of Vageaensis was known from the Council of Carthage (411).

Fulgentius (Catholic bishop) fl.484 was exiled by Vandal king Huneric in 484AD. Richard Oliver Gerow of Natchez-Jackson was bishop in the 1970s. Long-term bishop Franz Xaver Schwarzenböck(1972-2010) was then succeeded by Wieslaw Szlachetka, who has been bishop since December 21, 2013.
