= List of prehistoric sites in Morocco =

This is a list of notable prehistoric sites in Morocco. The historical record in Morocco begins around 650 BCE, with the arrival of the Phoenicians and the founding of the settlement of Mogador. These sites have been dated by archaeologists earlier than that.

- Adrar Metgourine, near Akka
- Aguerd
- Aïn Maarouf
- Ashakar, near Tangier (El-Khil caves)
- Assif Kelmt
- Al Mahbas, Sahara
- Al Farciya, Sahara
- El Mries
- Bazina du Gour, Meknes
- Caf Taht el Ghar, near Tetouan
- Cave of the Rhinocerosses, Casablanca
- Dar es Soltane
- Djebel Irhoud
- Draa river
- El Khenzira
- Figuig
- Gueltat Zemmour, Sahara
- Hawza, Sahara
- Ifrane of the Little Atlas/Jbel Atlas Saghru
- Ifri Oudadane
- Island of Essaouira
- Jdririya, Sahara
- Mzoura Cromlech, near Asilah (funerary monument, megalith, cromlech)
- Rouazi
- Smara, Sahara
- Taforalt, Oujda (cf. Nassarius shells)
- Taouz, Tafilalt
- Tensift, Marrakesh
- Waramdaz
- Yagour, High Atlas Mountains near Oukaimden
