= Henchir-Ezzguidane =

Locality in Tunisia

Africa Proconsularis (125 AD)

Henchir-Ezzguidane or Henchir el Zguidane is a locality in Tunisia.

The site is notable for the significant Roman Era ruins including a Byzantine Fortress Réservoirs and aqueduct. Archeological survey has been conducted by the French in the 19th century.
