= Sega (Upper Egypt) =

SA A i i N36 s g A niwt
šꜣj sgꜣ
in hieroglyphs
Era: 1st Intermediate Period
(2181–2055 BC)

Sega or Shai-Sega (meaning Meadows of Sega) was an ancient Egyptian town located in the 4th Upper Egyptian nome. It is first attested in the tomb of Ankhtifi, the nomarch of Hierakonpolis loyal to the rulers of the 10th Dynasty in Heracleopolis Magna.

== Siege by Ankhtifi ==
In his tomb, Ankhtifi recalls siding with Heracleopolitan kings by initiating a campaign against a coalition of Thebes and Coptos (4th and 5th Upper Egyptian nomes respectively). Sailing downstream from Hefat (modern day El-Mo'alla), he claims finding no resistance from the Thebans in a fortress called Semekhsen near modern-day Armant. He then sails further downstream, where he claims that residents of a town called Shai-Sega have bolted its door bolts, in fear of Ankhtifi. He decides to lay siege on the town.

== Location ==
The town's only attestation hitherto comes from the tomb of Ankhtifi and it is not mentioned in other periods of ancient Egyptian history, rendering it a lost city. Some Egyptologists place it south of the modern day village of Khuzam, 17 km (11 miles) north of Luxor.

== See also ==
- Ankhtifi
- El-Mo'alla
- First Intermediate Period of Egypt

== Bibliography ==
- Vandier, Jacques. Mo’alla: La tombe d’Ankhtifi et la tombe de Sébekhotep. Institut Francais d’Archéologie Orientale, Cairo, 1950.
