= Douela =

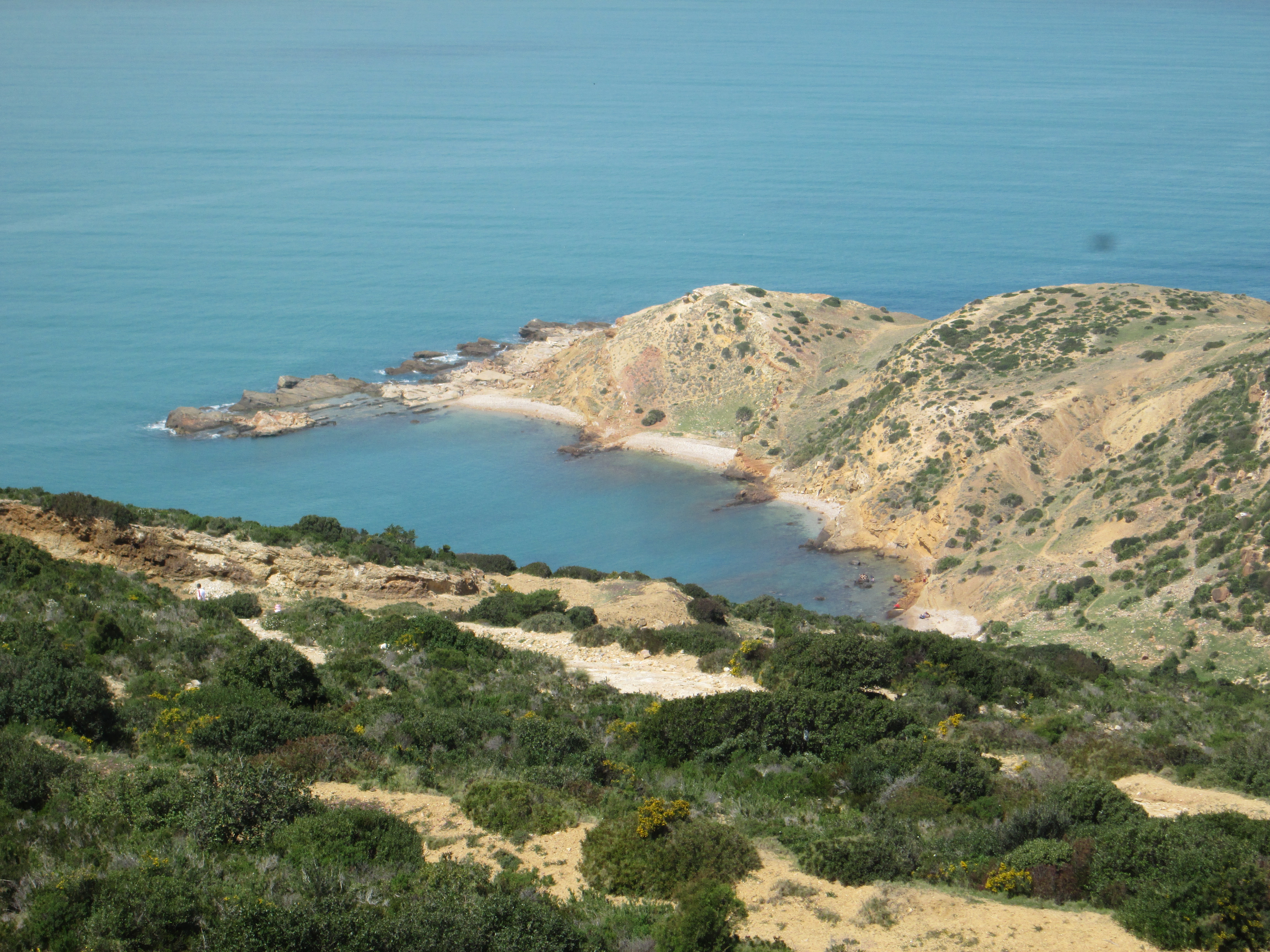
country around Douela

Douela or Douala is a village and locality in Tunisia, situated on the Mediterranean coast at latitude 36.8167°, longitude 10.5667° (37km east of Tunis) and near Sīdī `Ammār, Korbous, and El Bredj.

== Locality ==
Douela lies on the Cap Bon peninsula surrounded by the Qorbus Forest, the area especially the thermal springs at nearby Korbous have been popular as a health resort since Roman times.

== History ==
During the Roman Empire and late antiquity the village of Douela was a town of the Roman province of Africa Proconsularis. The site has revealed numerous inscription in the ruins of the Roman town which tell us the Ancient town was a civitas known as Mizigitanorum.

In antiquity, Douela was also the seat of a Christian bishopric known as Mizigi. This diocese remains today a titular bishopric of the Roman Catholic Church. Only two bishops of ancient Douela (Mizigi) are known.

- The name of Adeodatus was discovered in the inscription on the dedication of a church, possibly the bishop who had it built.
- Placido attended the Council of Carthage (525)
- Raúl Antonio Martinez Paredes of Guatemala is the current bishop.

The town also has a mosque.
