= Kageras =

Coordinates: 21.13°N 30.7°E

Kageras is a late medieval era fort in Sudan. Located in Upper Nubia, it lies on the eastern side of the Nile, about halfway between the third and second cataract. During the tenth or eleventh century, a church was built here. A defensive wall was added in the late Middle Ages. The wall was once about 3 metres (9.8 ft) high and is still well preserved. On every corner, there are round towers. In the north, there is an entrance. It is doubtful whether this 35 by 35 metres (115 ft × 115 ft) wide site was inhabited continuously. It appears to be more like a refuge for Christian from attacking nomads. A 1966-1969 American - Swiss expedition examined the site.
