= Umm Marrahi fort =

Fort in Sudan

Coordinates: 15°58′40″N 32°32′59″E

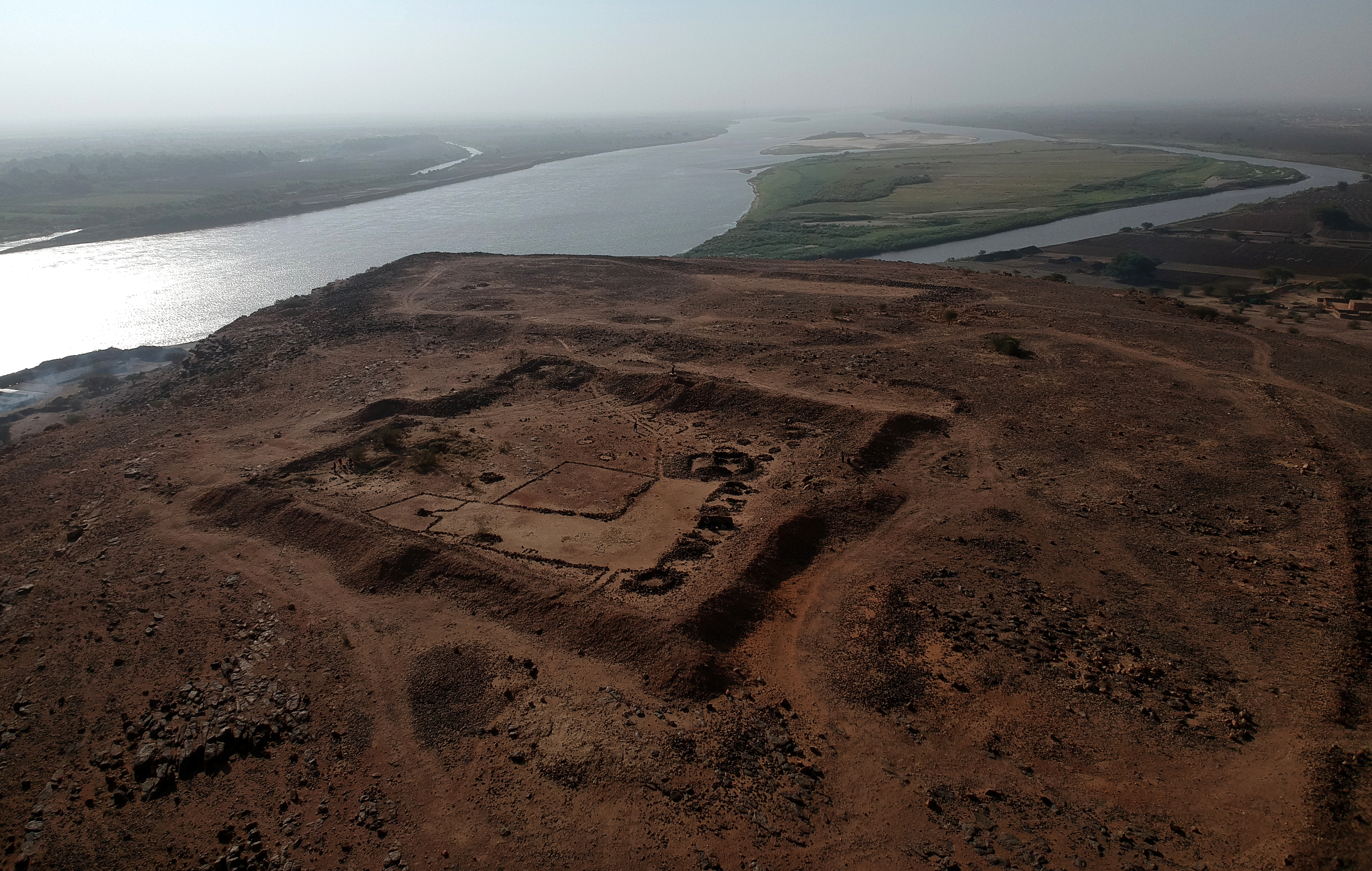
Fort at Jebel Umm Marrahi

The Umm Marrahi fort is a ruined fortress on the top of Umm Marrahi hill (Khartoum province, Sudan, EPSG: 3857). The defenses were built in the 2nd half of the 6th century AD. At that time, the region was part of the kingdom of Alwa. The ruins of its capital (Soba) are 50 km southeast from Umm Marrahi.

The fort on the top of the hill is a regular defensive enclosure with a quadrilateral layout and internal dimensions measuring 67x63 meters. The walls in 2018 were preserved to a height of approx. 1.5 meters, originally they were 3.5 meters high. They were built of irregular stones bounded with mud mortar. The core of the wall was made of stone and mud brick. The corners were reinforced with bastions. Bastions were also recorded in the midway of the northern, western and southern curtains. The only gate was located from the riverside, in the midway of the eastern curtain. It was equipped with an L-shape external wall channeling the approach to the entrance.

Originally, the fort was inhabited from the 2nd half of the 6th century until the first half of the 7th century. Subsequently, it was abandoned for approx. 1000 years. It was reoccupied during the Funj period (16th-19th century). In the 19th century, it was used during Mahdiyya uprising, both by the dervishes and British troops. During the Second World War, the anti-aircraft battery was placed on the hill. In the 20th and 21st century the area enclosed by the ruined walls has also been used by local Sufi brotherhood (Tarika Tayibiyya) in their rituals.
