= Henchir-Ed-Douamès =

Archaeological site and locality in Béja, Tunisia

- Uchi Maius
- Location within Tunisia
- 36.41222°N 9.08500°E
- Periods: Classical and late antiquity
- Cultures: Roman, Vandal
- Location: Tunisia
- Region: Tunis Governorate

Henchir-Ed-Douamès is an archaeological site and locality in Tunisia, located 120 km southwest of Tunis, in the Governorate of Béja, near Dougga. It is identified with the ancient city of Uchi Maius.

== History ==
Africa Proconsularis (125 AD).

The ruins have been identified as the remains of Uchi Maius a civitas of the province of Africa Proconsularis during the Roman Empire.

The city is a Numidian foundation of the 5th century BC. Roman colonization begins after the defeat of Jugurtha in 103 BC., with the installation of veterans of Gaius Marius. The city was granted the title of Roman colony in 230 by Sévère Alexandre, became the seat of a bishopric in the 5th century and remained active in the Vandal and Byzantine kingdoms. In the same way, an Arab installation is attested there in the 9th–12th centuries.

== Remains ==
The ruins have been surveyed being identified in 1882 and studied first by Charles Tissot, followed by René Cagnat in 1885. Alfred Merlin and Louis Poinssot published a major book at the beginning of the 20th century. The site was then abandoned in favor of the more promising site of Dougga located not far away.

An agreement between the National Institute of Heritage and the University of Sassari allows to restart the work on the site from 1994 onwards.

The most prominent feature of the ruins is the amphitheater. but there are also several inscriptions of note. One such inscription in the ruins honors Constantine and calls him our restorer. Other features include

- Arch of Severus Alexander (239)
- Arch of Gordian III (241)
- Forum
- Temple dedicated to the Capitoline Triad
- Paleo-Christian basilica
- Baths recently excavated and dating from the first half of the 4th century
- Amphitheater in the course of release but traditionally dated from the 3rd century

The sole olive oil press from the Vandal era was found at Uchi Maius, situated within the forum area. This discovery unveiled an olive oil production center that operated from the latter part of the 5th century until the end of the Vandal period.

The city was also the seat of an ancient Christian bishopric, which survives today as a titular see of the Roman Catholic Church.
