= Hellenion (Naucratis) =

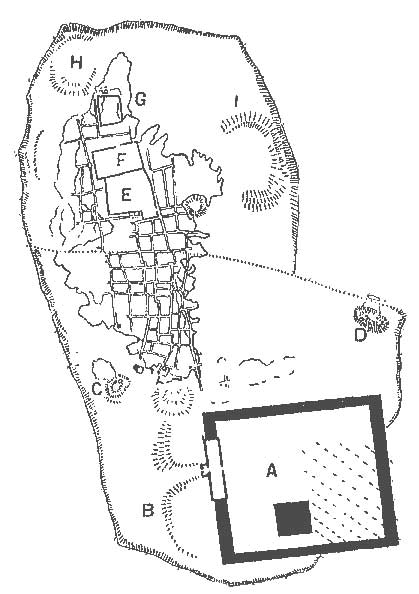
Map showing the remains of the city of Naucratis by Petrie in 1885 Legend: A: Main Sanctuary; B: Current Arab Village; E: Temples of Apollo and Hera; F: Temple of the Dioscuri; G: Temple of Aphrodite

Hellenion (Greek: Ἑλλήνιον) was an ancient Greek sanctuary in Naucratis (Egypt), founded by the cities Rhodes, Cnidus, Halicarnassus, Phaselis, Chios, Teos, Phocaea, Clazomenae and Mytilene in the reign of Amasis (6th century BC).
