= Kom Firin =

Archaeological site in Egypt

Coordinates: 30.8631°N 30.4899°E

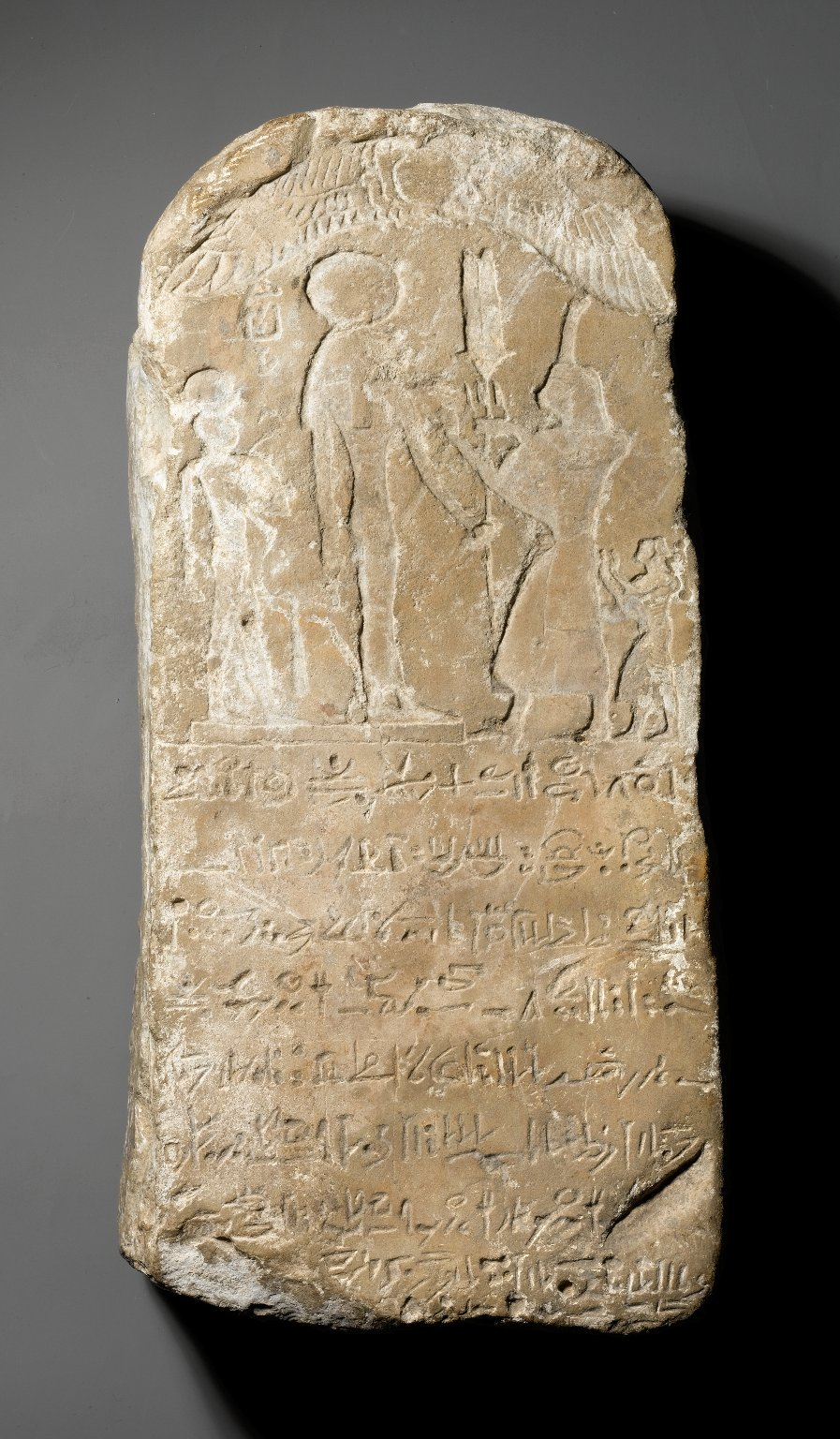
Stele of the Chief of the Libu Tjerpahati, a contemporary of pharaoh Shoshenq V of the 22nd Dynasty, and most likely coming from Kom Firin.

Kom Firin is an archaeological site in Egypt, located in the southwestern border of the Nile Delta, just west of Kom el-Hisn. Most of the archaeological informations regarding the site were obtained from the 2002–2010 excavation campaign organized by the British Museum and led by Neal Spencer.

Kom Firin was located on a Finniya Canal that was flowing north to the Mediterranean. The ancient city of Naucratis was about 10km to the east, but there was no convenient transportation between these two cities. Naucratis was located on the old Canopic Nile branch, that was also flowing north. But it was located on the eastern side of the Canopic branch, and thus further from Kom Firin.

== History ==
Earliest attestations of Kom Firin date back to the reign of Ramesses II of the 19th Dynasty, and it appears most likely that it was founded during this period as a fortified town against Libyan incursions from the western border of Egypt. Its original Egyptian name has not been discovered yet.
A large (225 x 199 m), enclosure was unearthed in the eastern part of the site, and it is believed to be the remain of a fortified Ramesside temple. During the Late Period the town underwent a significant remodelling and expansion, and so did the older New Kingdom enclosure, now surrounding a quadrupled area. Kom Firin's necropolis was possibly located in the nearby site of Silvagou.

Spencer suggests that Kom Firin had reached near its greatest extent during the Saite period in the mid-first millennium BC. At this time, its extent could have reached around 57 hectares, which would imply that it then contained between 3800 and 5700 houses.

== State of preservation ==
In later times, Kom Firin was progressively demolished by sebakh diggers. A prominent, modern feature of the site is the presence of pillars and pinnacles made of mudbricks, and up to 10 m high, which are the result of the combined action of weather and sebakh–digging on the ancient enclosure and buildings.
