= Abu Nafisa fort =

Coordinates: 16°00′50″N 32°33′14″E

Abu Nafisa fort is a ruin located on the left bank of the Nile, in Khartoum Province (Sudan). It was built by the rulers of Alwa.

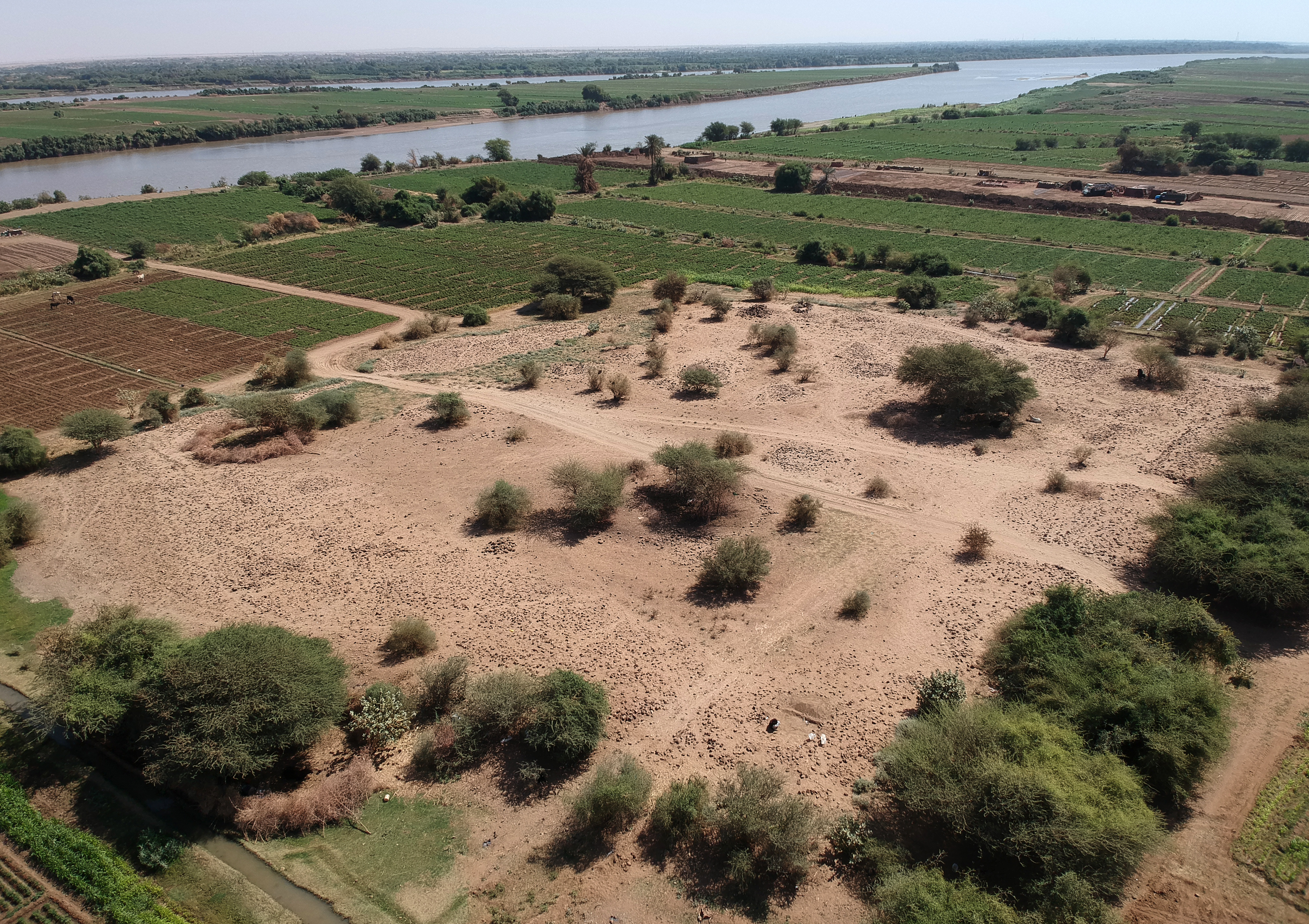
Remains of Abu Nafisa fort in 2018

The enclosure in quadrilateral in layout with internal dimensions measuring 83x78 meters. In three corners in 2018, traces of bastions have survived. In the fourth corner, south-eastern, there was a much younger oval tomb of Sheikh Abu Nafisa, dated to the last centuries of the Funj Sultanate (18th-19th century). The name of the site comes from this individual

The fort was built in the 2nd half of the 6th century AD and was used for a short period. At the same time, a similar fort Hosh el-Kab was built 500 meters from Abu Nafisa. Fort Abu Nafisa, unlike Hosh el-Kab, was erected too close to the river, so the high floods that occasionally occur have been damaging the architecture. Currently, areas surrounding Abu Nafisa fort are cultivated and every now and then they are flooded. The last flooding of the Nile, which reached the walls of the fort, took place in April 2019. Satellite imagery from Google Earth shows the site being periodically underwater.
