= Khor Shingawi =

Archaeological site in Sudan

Coordinates: 16.938056°N 33.74861°E

Khor Shingawi is an archaeological site in Sudan. It is situated about 12.5 kilometres (7.8 mi) from the Nile to the south of the Merowe Dam.

== Description ==
The site includes the remains of a palatial building, probably dating to 500 to 1500 AD. Its former role and exact date remains unknown. The building is largely isolated, rectangular in shape, and built of stone. It is divided into three parts, with about 20 rooms and corridors that are located on two levels. The centerpiece is a courtyard with a ramp that leads up to a podium.
