= Titular Bishopric of Vita =

Roman Catholic titular see

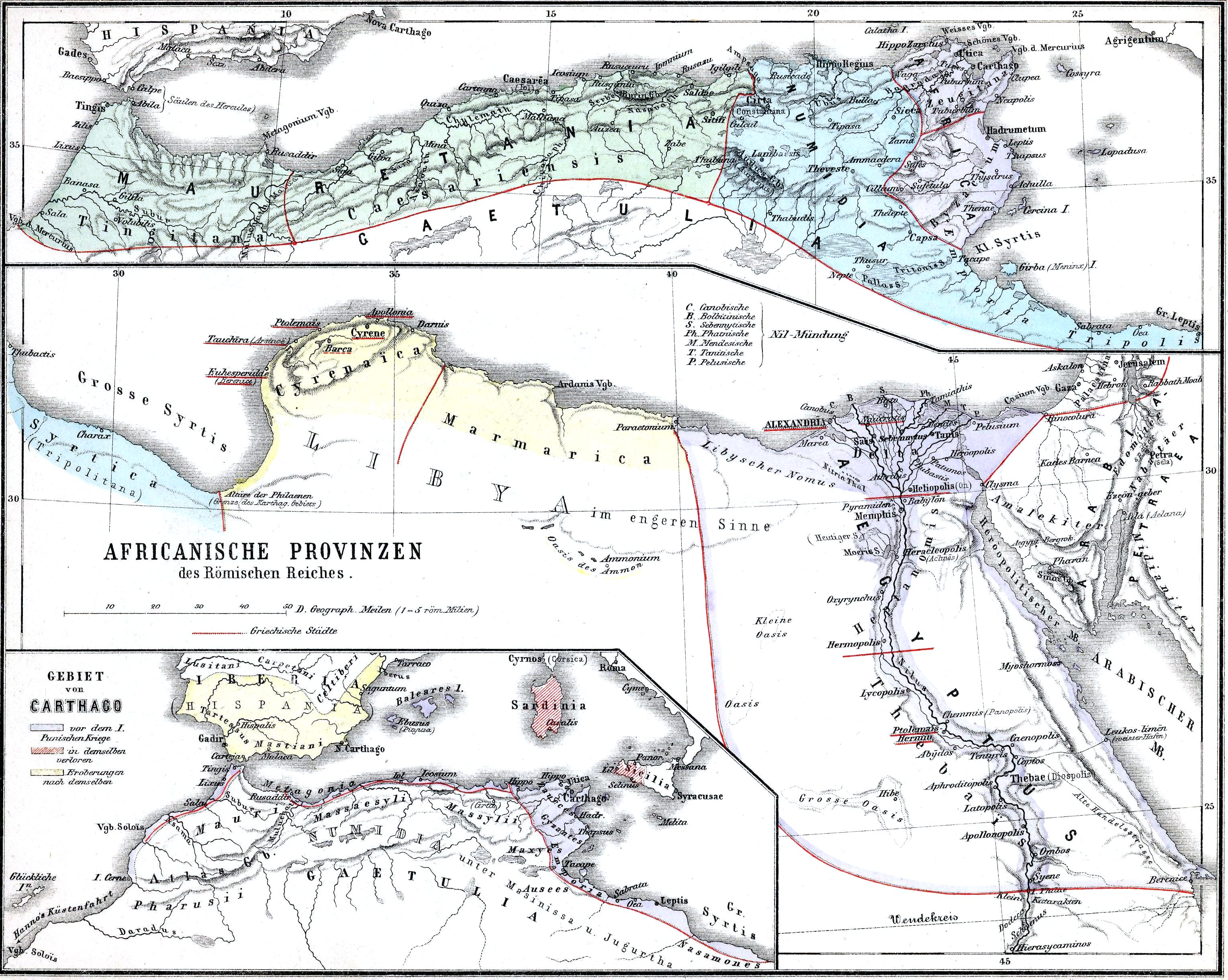
Africa Proconsulare.

Vita was a Roman–Berber civitas in Africa Proconsularis. It is a former Christian diocese and Latin Catholic titular see.

== History ==
The ancient city of Vita's location is identified with the ruins of Beni-Derraj in modern Tunisia. It was important enough in the late Roman province of Byzacena to become one of the many suffragan sees of its capital Hadrumetum (modern (Sousse))'s Metropolitan Archbishorpic. Founded during Roman times, it survived the Vandal and Byzantine rule, but ceased to function following the Umayyad conquest of 670AD.

Among the bishops of Vita is noted especially Victor (487–?), an ecclesiastical writer who witnessed the occupation of Roman North Africa and the persecution of Catholics by the Vandals.

Another well-known bishop of Vita was Pampiniano, a victim of the Arian 487AD persecution by Vandal king Genseric and remembered by the Roman Martyrology on November 28.

== Titular see ==
The Roman-era civitas (town) of Vita was the seat of a Roman Catholic diocese of Africa Proconsulare. There were two known bishops:

- Panpinianus (Catholic bishop fl.418–430)
- Victor (Catholic bishop fl 484.) exiled by the Vandal king Huneric

The diocese was nominally restored in 1933 as a Latin titular bishopric.

It has had the following incumbents, of the (lowest) episcopal rank :

- Timothy J. Corbett (25 June 1938 – death 20 July 1939), retired first Bishop of Crookston (Minnesota, USA) (1910.04.09 – 1938.06.25)
- Arthur Douville (30 November 1939 – 27 November 1942)
- Joseph Aloysius Burke (April 17, 1943 – February 7, 1952)
- Francisco Orozco Lomelín (19 March 1952 – 17 October 1990)
- Blessed Álvaro del Portillo (7 December 1990 – 23 March 1994)
- Pablo Cedano Cedano, (31 May 1996 – 19 November 2018), Auxiliary Bishop emeritus of Santo Domingo (Dominican Republic)
- Roberto Rosmaninho Mariz (26 May 2023 - Auxiliary Bishop of Porto (Portugal)

== See also ==
- Vita, Ávila
- Vita, Maharashtra

== Sources and external links ==
- GCatholic, with titular incumbent bio links
