= Taberdga, Algeria =

Village in Algeria

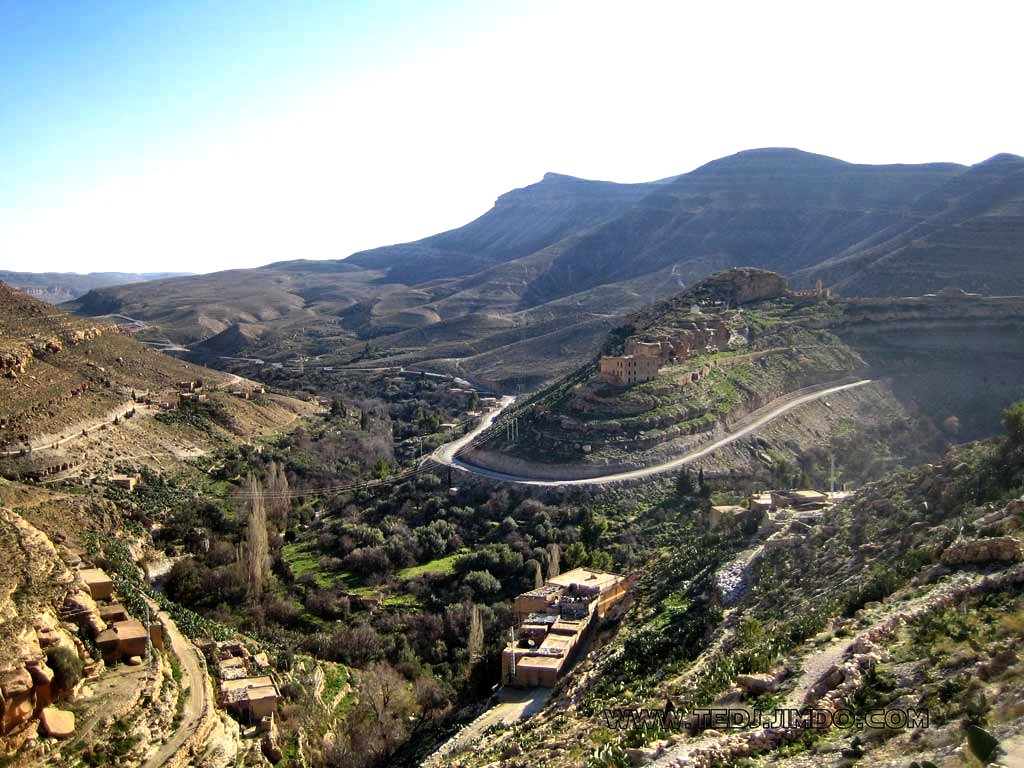
Taberdga

Taberdga is an ancient town in the Aurès Mountains of northeast Algeria. Situated on the edge of a steep cliff, the town's well-preserved ruins include a mosque and other traditional stone architecture in the Berber tradition. The town was written about by M.W. Hilton-Simpson, a traveler, collector and ethnographer who traveled extensively in North and Central Africa in the early part of the twentieth century.

Taberdga was listed as a national heritage site in 2008.
