= Almorada =

Almorada الموردة
- District

Arabic transcription(s)
  - Common: الموردة
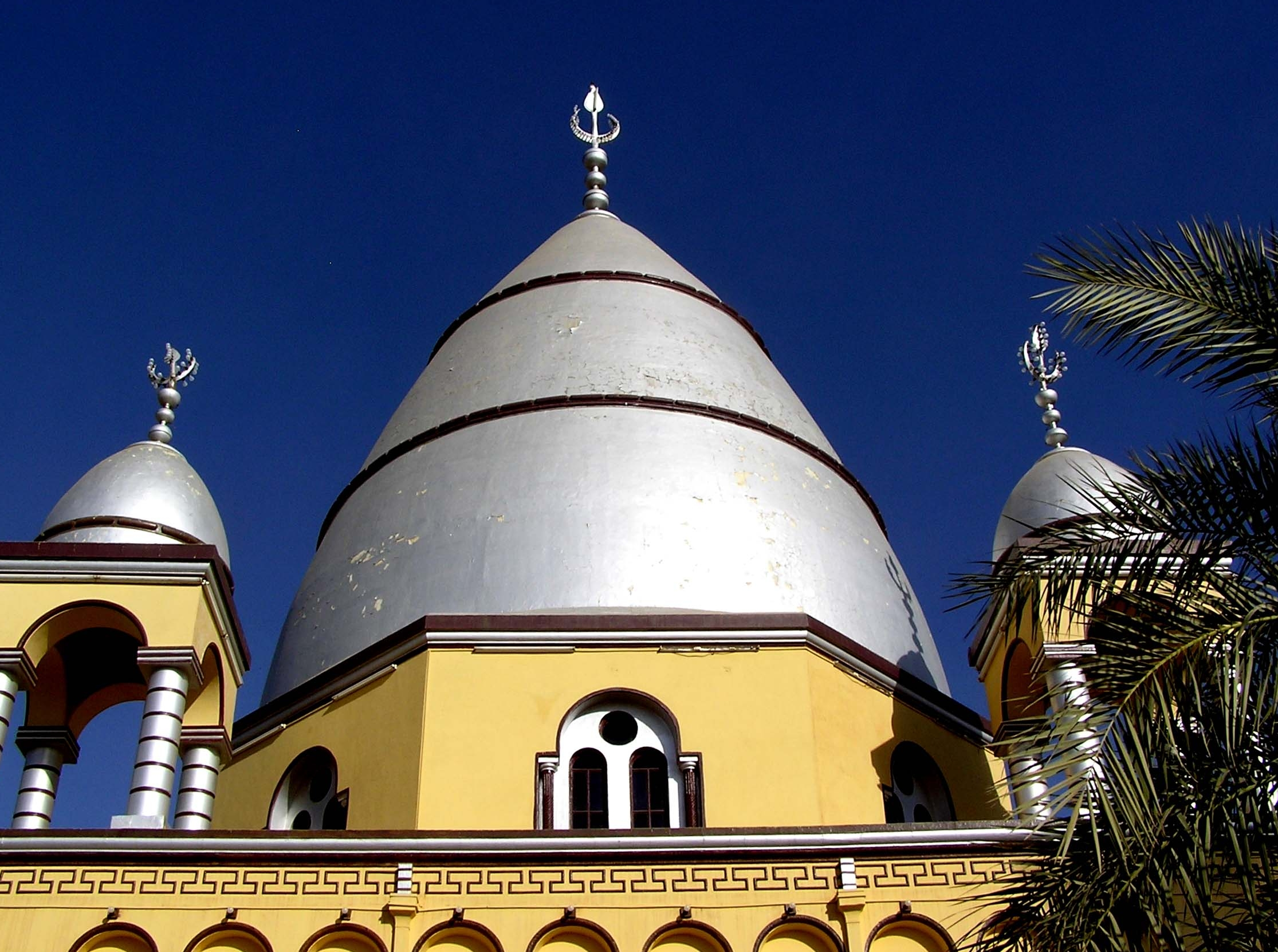

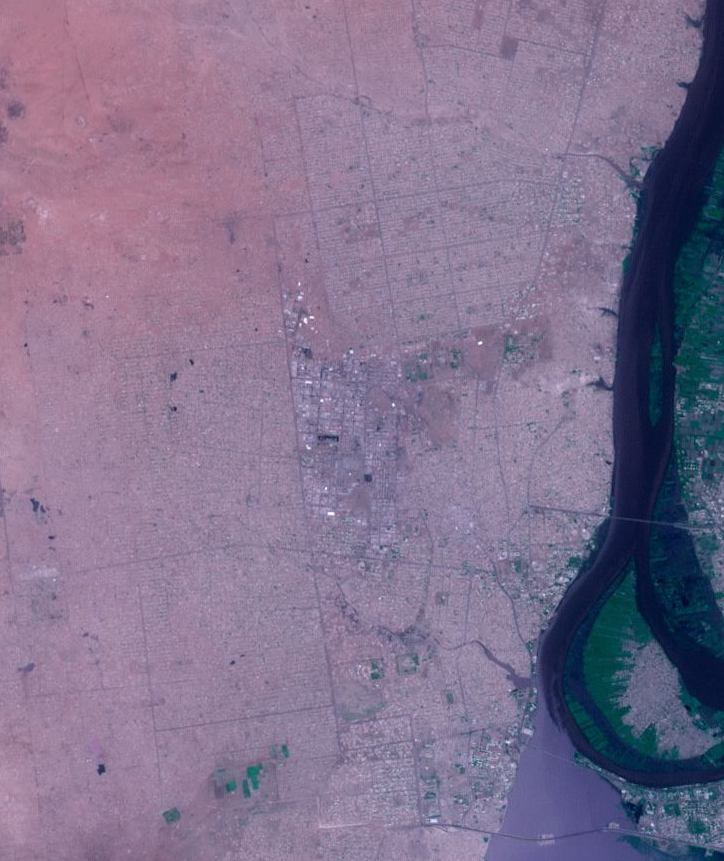
- Map of Bant (inset: map of Omdurman)

- Location of Almorada in Sudan
- Coordinates: 15°39′N 32°29′E
- Country: Sudan
- Governorate: Khartoum
- Time zone: UTC+3 (East Africa Time)
  - Summer (DST): UTC+3

Almorada (Arabic: الموردة / transliterated: Almo rada) is an ancient district in Omdurman city, Khartoum State, Sudan. Almorada neighborhood is one of the most prestigious districts in the Eastern part of Omdurman city.

== Geography ==
The East Almorada border touches Nile Street, a two-way street extending from north to south, and Almorada Street which extends from north to south dividing the district to Almorada East and Almorada West. It is bordered on the south by Khour Abuanjah and on the north by Alhashmab and Alomara district.

== History ==
The district is one of the old residential districts in Omdurman, but it was founded before the Mahdist State. Almorada district is one of the neighborhoods of Omdurman city, which is an ancient and old neighborhood and may have been built before Omdurman became the capital of Sudan in 1884.

== Etymology ==
The story about the name which was given after: We find that Imam Mohamad Ahmad Almahdi was taken the small village of Omdurman as headquarters of the Government of AlMahdia at that time and began to build this city. The sailboats carrying timber, firewood and food from the north, east and souththen were provided to Omdurman at the north shore of the Nile to Almahdi House and Khalifa al-Mahdi, and therefore called on this Anchorage Almorada.

== Climate ==
Almorada features a hot desert climate, with only the months of July and August seeing significant precipitation. Almorada averages a little over 155 millimetres (6.1 in) of precipitation per year. Based on annual mean temperatures, Omdurman is one of the hottest major cities in the world. Temperatures may exceed 53 °C (127 °F) in mid-summer.

Its average annual high temperature is 37.1 °C (99 °F), with six months of the year seeing an average monthly high temperature of at least 38 °C (100 °F). Furthermore, none of its monthly average high temperatures falls below 30 °C (86 °F). This is something not seen in other major cities with hot desert climates. Temperatures cool off considerably during the night, with Omdurman's lowest average low temperature of the year just above 15 °C (59 °F).

== Social life in Almorada district ==
Omdurman is the country's historic, cultural, and spiritual capital. Almorada natural result of their diversification and growth, were divided into various tribes and families. The basis of co-operative effort among all people in the society whether he is black or fair-skinned. No one will be regarded as high or low. There will be no untouchability. There will be no special restrictions upon them in eating, drinking and social contracts. They are affectionate, cooperative and helpful to each other. All of them are fond of sympathy, affection, kindness and fair treatment.

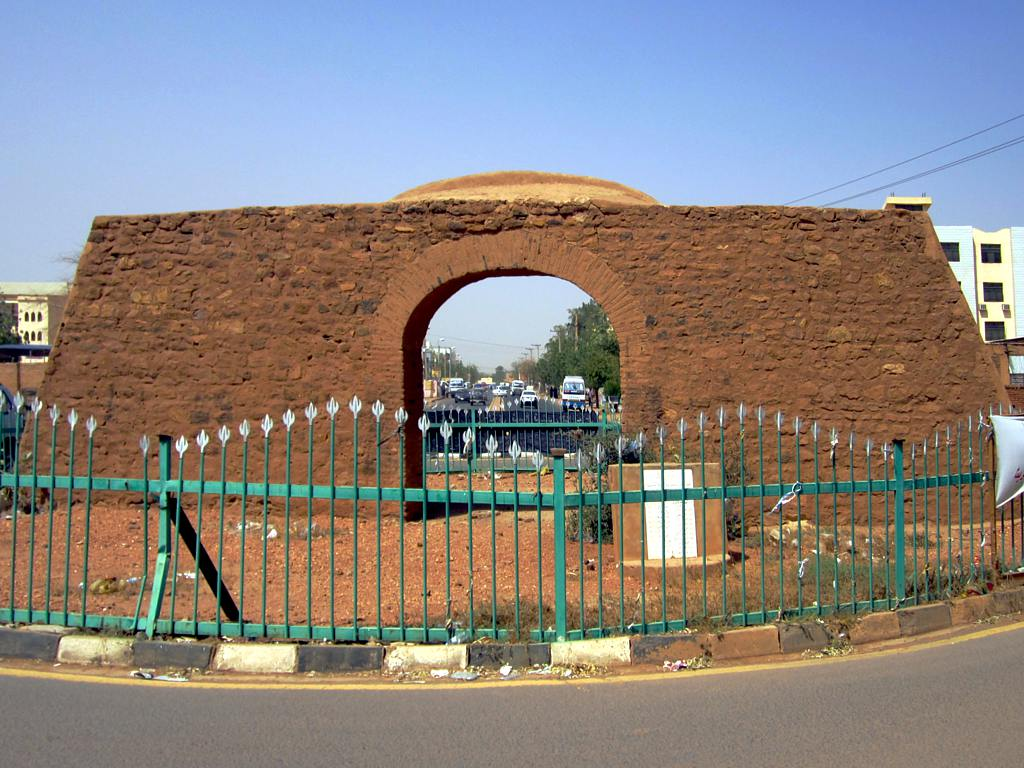
Abdul Gayoom gate (Bwabt Abdul Gayoom)

== Famous places and buildings ==
- Abdul Gayoom gate.
- Al Morada Fish Market
- Al-Mourada football club, is a Sudanese football club based in Al-Mourada, a suburb of Omdurman. Along with Al-Hilal and Al-Merrikh, they formed the triplet of Sudanese football, but they couldn't that legacy. They were one of the strongest teams in Sudan during their strong reign in the top division of the Sudanese football before being relegated to the 2nd division league due to some financial difficulties. Al-Mourada along with Hilal Alsahil are the only two teams who had broken the domination of the Sudanese football by Al-Hilal Omdurman and Elmerrikh SC as the league title was always won by either one of the rivals. Al-Mourada have been crowned as the champions of the Sudanese 1st division which was the top tier of the Sudanese football at that time in the year 1968. Their home stadium is Al-Mourada Stadium located in the Mourada district in Omdurman which is being renovated to cope with international standards.
- Almorada Family park
- Dar Al-ryadh Omdurman in Shari'a Almorada.

== Education ==
There are several educational institutions in Almorada Omdurman. Some of the notable schools include:

- Elementary Schools and High Schools:
- Al-Ahfad higher secondary school.
- Almorada basis School for boys.

== The most important families in Almorada ==
- The family of Mr. Hasan Idrissi, and his tomb evaluates, Idrisid gentlemen, professor Abdel Aal and son of Idris and Dr. Tazi and mogadid and their brothers.
- The family Bekbashy Khalaf Allaah Khalid Financial Secretary of White Brigade movement and the first Sudanese defense minister and member of the Senate.
- Mawlana judge Dirdiri Mohamed Osman Khaled, a member lordship Council.

== The most important figures in Almorada ==
- The late Zahir Surour Elsadati
- Dr. Khalda Zahir the first Sudanese woman to ever enter the college and medical school in Sudan history. She has been very active in the political and social life in Almorada.
