= Contra Latopolis =

Temple in Egypt

Coordinates: 25.284°N 32.583°E

Contra Latopolis (sometime named Al Hilla or El-Hella) is an Egyptian temple.

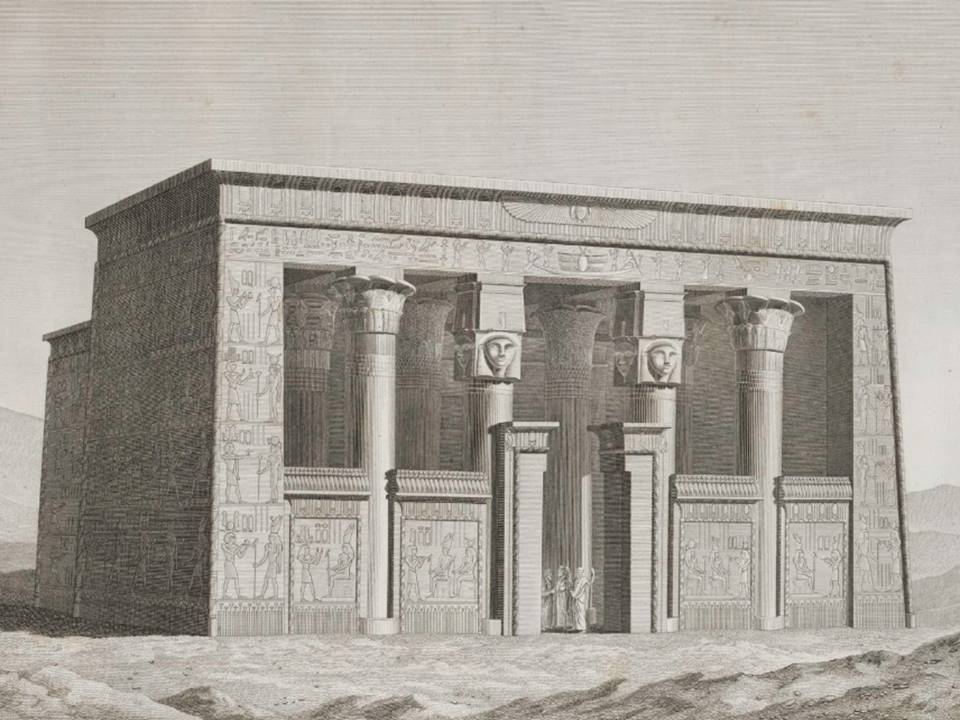
Temple to Isis in Contra Latopolis

During the reign of Cleopatra VII, a temple to Isis was built opposite Latopolis, or Esne as it is now known, on the other side of the Nile from this settlement. The Roman people having constructed this, named the building Contra Latopolis. Very little has survived into the current age of this construction, all but a "massive portico upheld by two rows of four columns each"

The temple built together with these mentioned structures includes, positioned on the overhanging eaves, a globe with wings outstretched to either side. The walls of the building were found covered with hieroglyphic writing. Of the names amongst them, the earliest of these showed Cleopatra Cocce (Cleopatra III), and her son Ptolemy Soter, the most recently written showed the name of Emperor Commodus, the decorations were made between the reign of Cleopatra III and Soter II.

The columns of a building in Contra Latopolis are said by Maspero to date from construction during the Ptolemic period, the columns of buildings from Contra Latopolis considered particularly distinct examples of a formal order of architecture where the god Hathor is placed as capitals upon the columns of temples.

== See also ==
- List of ancient Egyptian sites, including sites of temples
