= Hillat al-Arab =

Coordinates: 18.506833°N 31.815472°E

Hillat al-Arab (also Hillat el-Arab) is a former village and now an archaeological site in Sudan. It is located about 3 kilometres (1.9 mi) south of Jebel Barkal. An Italian expedition discovered a graveyard at this site, which dates to the period of ca. 1200 to 750 BC. This locality is of particular importance because there are very few Nubian remains from that era. it dates to the period just before the beginning of the Kingdom of Kush. Hillat al-Arab contains about twenty tombs carved into rock, each consisting of several rooms, and meant for different people. As the ceiling of the main chamber collapsed in antiquity, there was no grave robbing. The grave chamber was painted in a rather primitive style. Artifacts in the tombs include vessels and jewelry. The ceramics from the oldest grave is largely Egyptian; at that time, the area was under Egyptian rule. Many vessels and jewelry were directly imported from Egypt, although the area was still hardly under its dominion. Grave 19 is of particular interest because it was used for centuries. The lowest layers are from the New Kingdom of Egypt, the top, later burials contained objects, and especially ceramics, very similar to the Cushitic.
