= Henchir-Boucha =

Catholic diocese and archaeological site in Tunisia

Henchir-Boucha is a former Catholic diocese and archaeological site in Tunisia.

Henchir-Boucha is at 36°31′41″N 9°53′10″E between Majaz al Bab and Bir al Mashariqah, central Tunisia. The site is 189 meters above sea level. and is on the Oued Zitoun lake and Oued es Sid River.

== History ==
During the Roman Empire and late antiquity Henchir-Boucha was the site of an ancient Roman town called Tubyza and was in the Roman province of Africa Proconsularis (now northern Tunisia). The remains of a large Roman Circus is at the site.

Tubyza may have been a suburb of the nearby city Municipium Aurelium Commodianum.

== Bishopric ==
Tubyza was the seat of an ancient Catholic bishopric. It is now a titular bishopric.

In antiquity, two bishops from Henchir-Boucha are known. Felix of Tubyza, was beheaded in Rome under Diocletian (15 January 304) for not handing over scriptures (traditor), and Honorius, who attended the Council of Carthage (411). The current bishop is Lucio Alfert of Paraguay.
