= Wadi Howar =

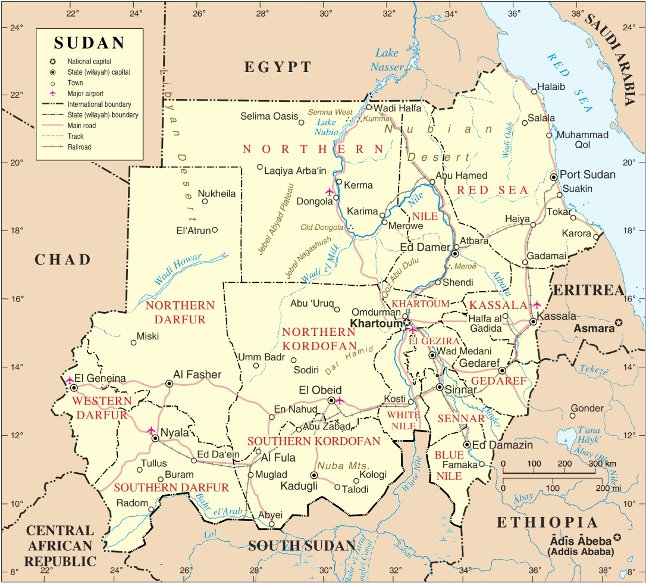
- Map of Sudan (after 2011)

Physical characteristics
- Mouth: Nile
  - coordinates: 18°11′56″N 30°44′26″E

Wadi Howar (Wadi Howa or Yellow Nile) is a wadi in Sudan and Chad.

== Geography ==
Originating in the Ennedi Region of Chad Wadi Howar runs through the Sudanese states of North Darfur and Northern to join the Nile north of the great bend opposite Old Dongola. Stretching over 1100 km in west–east direction across the southern fringes of the Libyan Desert, it ordinarily receives 25 mm of rainfall per year.

== Holocene period ==
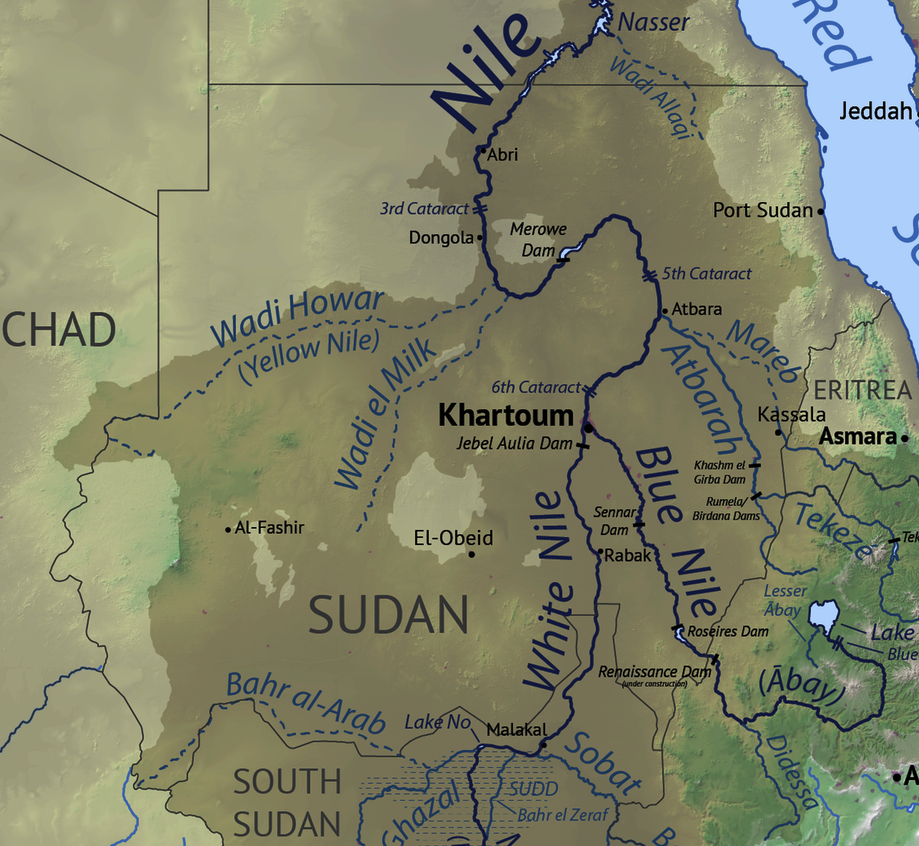
Map of Nile tributaries in modern Sudan

Wadi Howar is the remnant of the ancient Yellow Nile, a tributary of the Nile during the African humid period from about 9500 to 4500 years ago. At that time, savanna fauna and cattle herders occupied this region and the southern edge of the Sahara was some 500 kilometres (310 mi) further north than it is today. When the Sahara underwent desertification between 6000 and 4000 years ago, the wadi first became a chain of freshwater lakes and marshes, as shown by Ptolemy's world map, then it became extinct about 2000 years ago.

== Archaeology ==
Abundant prehistoric sites certify Wadi Howar as a once ecologically favoured area of settlement and a communication route between the inner regions of Africa and the Nile Valley. The hitherto most thoroughly investigated archaeological site in the wadi is Gala Abu Ahmed.

== See also ==
- African humid period
- Lake Ptolemy
