= North Asasif =

Part of the Theban Necropolis

North Asasif – is a part of the Theban Necropolis located on the bottom and sides of the valley, along the processional ways leading to the royal temples in Deir el-Bahari: temples of Mentuhotep II, Hatshepsut, and Thutmose III. It encompasses private tombs dating from the Middle Kingdom to the Ptolemaic period. Evidence has been found of strong ties between Asasif and Deir el-Bahari through the ages.

== Earlier archaeological research ==
Archaeological research on the Asasif necropolis was conducted in 1883 by the Supreme Council of Antiquities (SCA) and in the 1920s by an expedition directed by Herbert E. Winlock from the Metropolitan Museum of Art in New York. From 1969 to 1977, an expedition from the University of Vienna and the Austrian Archaeological Institute in Cairo carried out work in the framework of the “Austrian Excavations in the Asasif” project directed by Manfred Bietak.

== Recent archaeological research and discoveries ==
The Austrian excavations were resumed as part of The Ankh-Hor Project directed by Julia Budka, in cooperation with LMU Munich and the Austrian Academy of Sciences. The project aims to complete the documentation and conservation works initiated by M. Bietak, especially in the area of Saite Theban Tomb 414 (the tomb of Ankh-Hor), which will enhance our knowledge about the burial practices and grave furnishings of the 1st millennium BC.

In 2009–2014, a Spanish expedition from Instituto de Estudios del Antiguo Egipto in Madrid conducted research in the chapel of the tomb of Vizier Amenhotep Huy (Asasif Tomb No. 28). Two other tombs on the necropolis (TT 103 and TT 366) are being studied since 2014 as part of the Middle Kingdom Theban Project directed by Antonio J. Morales. In 2013, the Polish “Asasif Project”, directed by Anastasia Stupko-Lubczyńska and Patryk Chudzik, commenced its work under the auspices of the Polish Centre of Mediterranean Archaeology University of Warsaw. It aims to document private funerary architecture of the Middle Kingdom. Both the interiors of the rock-cut tombs and their courtyards on the rocky slopes are studied. The graves belong to high-ranking officials from the reigns of Mentuhotep Nebhepetre II and the subsequent rulers of the 11th and 12th dynasties. The results of the excavations, as well as studies of architectural remains and small finds, should also throw light on the later rebuilding and reuse of these structures. Although the necropolis had been known and studied for years, the Polish team made a discovery in 2014: a funerary chapel from the 12th dynasty, with a fragment of a limestone altar and funerary offerings, was uncovered in one of the courtyards.

Another project, started in 2018, is the “French Archaeological Mission in Asasif” (FAMA), a joint undertaking of the Institut français du Proche-Orient (IFAO), University of Strasbourg, and the French National Centre for Scientific Research (CNRS) directed by Frédéric Colin. The expedition works in tomb TT33 (“Archéologie contextuelle du temple funéraire de Padiaménopé dans l’environnement de l’Assassif”), studying its building phases and later functioning, which will help better understand the development of the whole Asasif Valley.

The research conducted by the Egyptians, which focuses on the tombs located on the bottom of the valley, has yielded the most spectacular discoveries: in 2019, a cachette with thirty wooden coffins from the 22nd dynasty (946–722 BC), containing excellently-preserved mummies of priests and priestesses, was found.
