= Senâm =

Archaeological site in Algeria

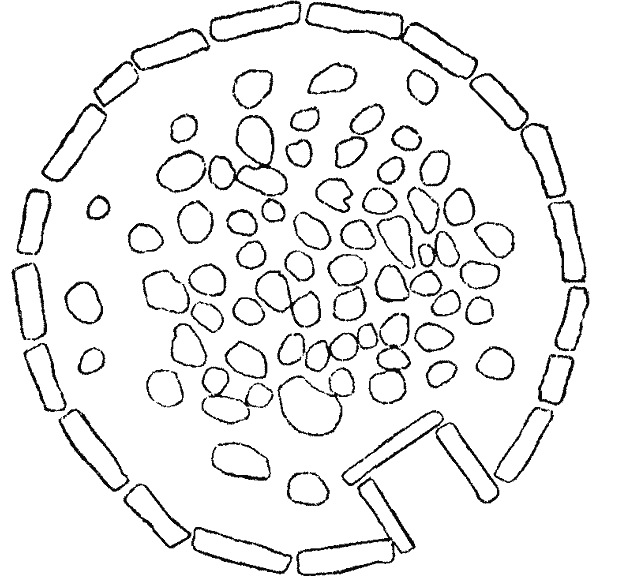
Stone circle at the Senâm, Algeria

Senâm is the name of a long, low hill situated in M'sila Province, Algeria, southwest of Algiers. The hill is covered with a large number of stone circles.

These stone circles are built of natural limestone, with standing slabs 2 to 3 feet (60 to 90 cm) high. The diameter of the circles varies between about 23 feet (7 m) and 34 feet (10 m). The entrance to the circles is on the southeastern side of the hill, through a larger, surrounding circle. It is uncertain if the niche was once roofed. The center of the circle is filled with stones for unknown purposes, possibly as a grave.
