= Henchir-el-Kermate =

Roman ruins in Tunisia

Africa Proconsularis (125 AD)

Henchir-el-Kermate is a location in Tunisia and set of Roman Era ruins. The ruins are in a square shape, with perimeter of 500 meters round the enclosure. The remains of a small temple or mausoleum. There are also traces of a pont bridge, Cisterns. and several illegible inscriptions.
