= Aïn Doura Baths =

Aïn Doura
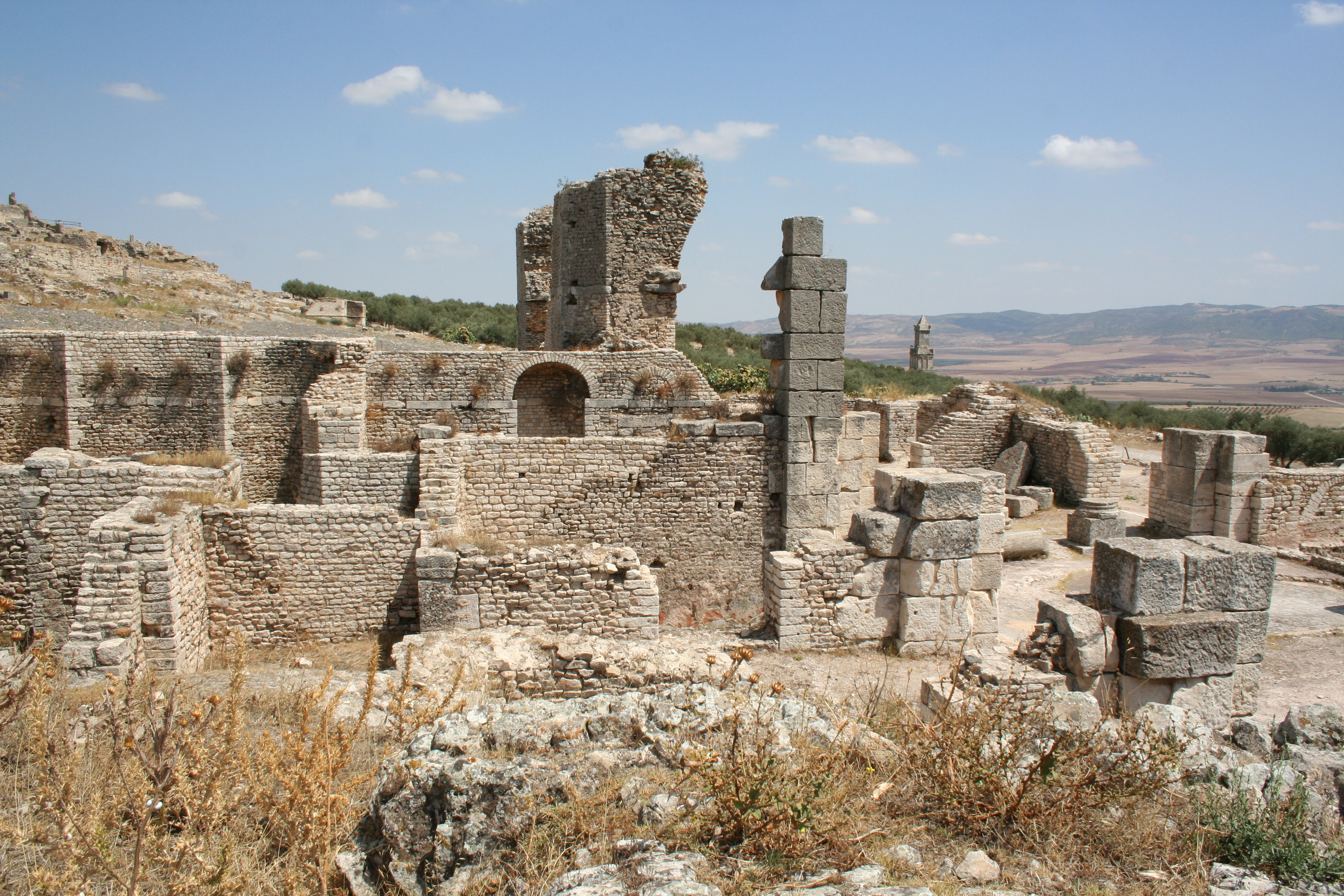
- Interactive map of Aïn Doura
- 36°25′20″N 9°13′6″E
- Type: Bath
- Location: Dougga, Tunisia

History
- Built by: Roman Empire

Site notes
- Material: Stone

The Aïn Doura Baths are a series of Roman-era ruins located in Dougga, Tunisia. The site contains ruins from a Roman bath dating to the 4th century, and is considered an important archaeological heritage site by the National Heritage Institute of Tunisia.

== Description ==
The Aïn Doura baths were built in either the early 2nd, late 3rd or 4th century AD in Dougga, which was then an important city in Roman-era Tunisia. The original name of the baths is unknown, as the name Aïn Doura was first given to the site in the 19th century. The Aïn Doura baths are one of three separate bath complexes in Dougga.

The baths were constructed of opus africanum and rubble masonry in the Punic–North African style. The structure contained a number of different rooms – such as heated rooms and frigidarium – and latrines. Archaeological research implies that the baths were symmetrical. The baths also contain mosaics depicting aquatic animals and Roman figures.
