= El Gour, Morocco =

El Gour
- الكور (Arabic)
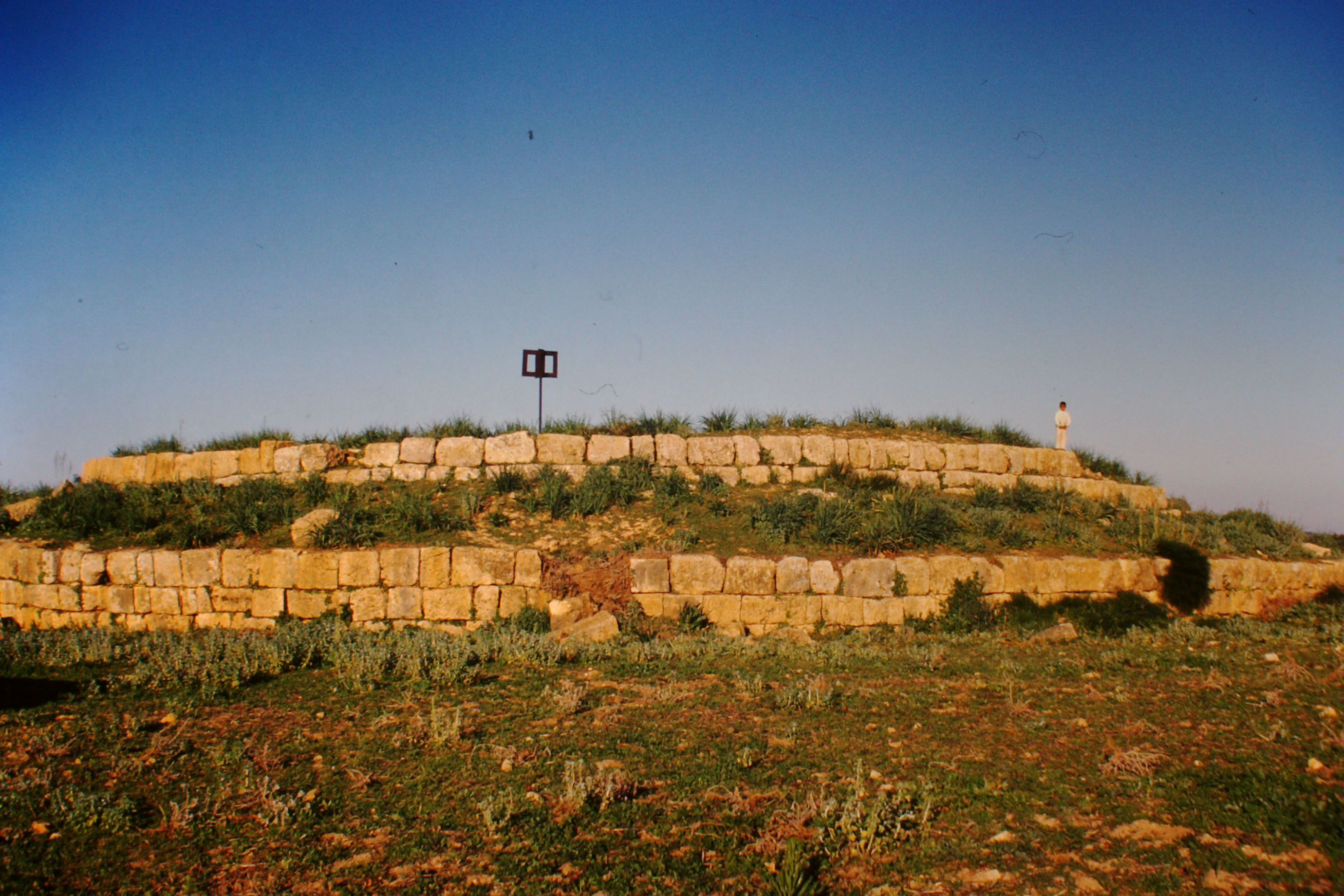

- Location within Morocco
- 33°51′01″N 05°18′32″W
- Type: Settlement
- Cultures: Berbers, Phoenician, Carthaginian
- Location: El Hajeb Province, Fès-Meknès, Morocco

History
- Built: 4th century BC

El Gour, or Bazina du Gour, is an ancient archeological site located in the Fès-Meknès region of northern Morocco. Estimates date the site at being constructed some time between the 4th and 2nd centuries BCE.

== Location ==
The village (douar) Souk Jemaa El Gour is located south of the A2 motorway about 30 km east of Meknès in an agricultural hilly landscape at the intersection of the roads P7050 and P7067. The structure called El Gour is located above a river valley, about 500 m northeast of the water tower of the village.

== Site description ==
The site of El Gour is a type of bazina, or burial mound, typically constructed solely for people of the utmost importance.

== World Heritage status ==
This site was added to the UNESCO World Heritage Tentative List on July 1, 1995, in the Cultural category.
