= Gala Abu Ahmed =

Coordinates: 17.7667°N 29.9178°E

Gala Abu Ahmed is a fortress ruin in lower Wadi Howar, northern Sudan. The 120 by 180 metres (390 ft × 590 ft) facility is located 110 kilometres (68 mi) west of the Nile. The fort was discovered in 1984 by archaeologists from the University of Cologne. It dates to the Kingdom of Kush's Napatan phase (ca. 750-350 BC). Radiocarbon dating suggests that the fortress was already in use around 1100 BC. The function of the building is still unclear.
