= El-Haria =

El Haria is a location and archaeological site in Tunisia North of Kairouan. The site gives its name to the El Haria Formation, a geological structure of the Paleocene era that covers much of central Tunisia. The site is also covered in numerous Roman era ruins and is tentatively identified as the site of an ancient Roman town.
