= Hosh el-Kab fort =

Fort in Sudan

Coordinates: 16°00′37″N 32°33′1″E

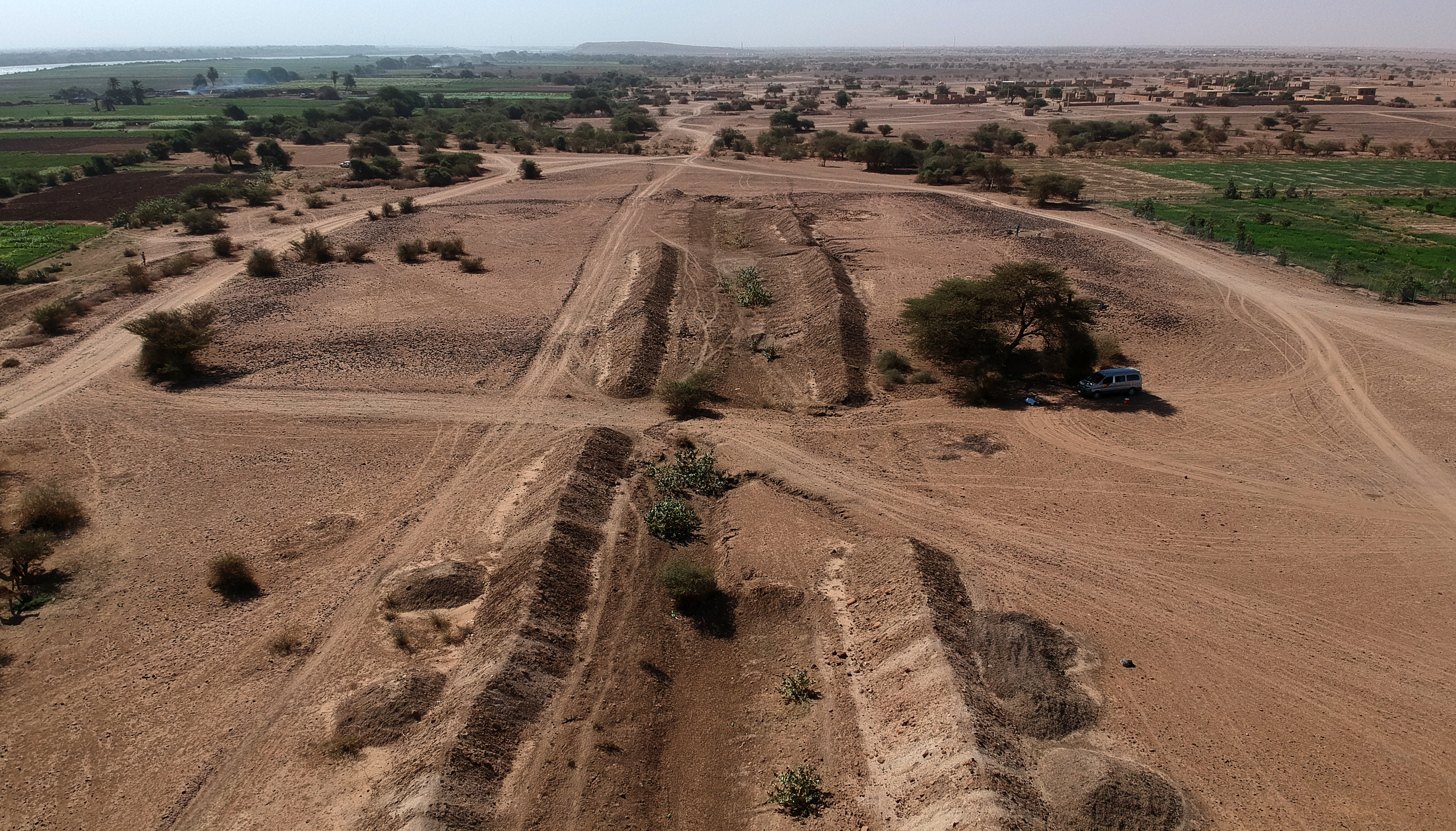
Fort Hosh el-Kab in 2018

The Hosh el-Kab fort is a fort in Sudan. Ruins of a stone fort located on the left bank of the Nile (geographical coordinates 16° 0'37.06 "N, 32° 33'1.16" E, EPSG: 3857), in Khartoum State (Sudan), at a distance of 40 km from the place where the waters of the White Nile meet with the Blue Nile. The enclosure was erected in the 2nd half of the 6th century AD. At that time, the region was under the Alwan rule.

It is the largest known regular fort in the Middle Nile Valley. It was built of stones bonded with mud mortar. It is quadrilateral in layout with internal dimensions measuring 97x88 meters. Thirteen bastions reinforced the walls, located in the corners and at regular intervals along the curtains. Two gates led to the fort, one from the riverside (from the east), the other from the desert (from the west). In 2018, the fort curtains were preserved to a height of about 0.7 meters.

Geophysical research conducted in 2018 proved that there are numerous structures erected along the inner faces of the walls as well as free-standing buildings. The fort was inhabited until the mid-seventh century. Afterward, it was no longer maintained. It was abandoned for approx. 1000 years. During the Funj period (16th-19th centuries), a small group settled in the ruins of the fort. Traces of buildings and stone structures from this period can be found mainly in the south-eastern part of the enclosure. Some of them were built directly on the ruins of the defenses.

In 2018, the place was abandoned. The proximity of the Nile (a distance of about 500 meters) makes the area attractive to local farmers. This is evidenced by a 10-meters wide irrigation channel, which was dug in 2013/2014 across the fort.
