= Henchir-Bir-El-Menadla =

Locality and archaeological site in Mahdia, Tunisia

Henchir-Bir-El-Menadla (Bir el Menadla) is a locality and archaeological site in Mahdia Governorate (Al Mahdiyah), Tunisia (North Africa).

== Location ==
It is located at 35°25'60" N and 10°16'0" E between Dahmani and El Djem, at an elevation of 61 meters above sea level. The site is near the Cherita and Sebkhet de Sidi El Hani lakes, and south of Kairouan.

Bir el Menadla is also known as Bi'r al Manadilah, Bir el Menadla, Bi’r al Manādilah Henchir-Bir-El-Menadka or just Menadla.

== Identification ==
The ruins at Menadla date from the Roman Empire and are tentatively identified as a station on the Roman Road from Althiburos(Dahmani) To Thysdrus(El Djem) called Terento, though there is a suggestion the town was named Forontoniana, has also be proposed.

The ruins are tentatively identified with a Roman town of the Roman province of Byzacene, called Terento. The town appears on the Tabula Peutingeria, and according to the Antonine Itinerary it was on the Roman Road from Althiburos To Thysdrus. about 10 miles from Aquae Regiae The Antonine Itinerary tells us that its neighbors were Germanieiana, tentatively identified with nearby Ksour-el-Maïete and Aeliae thought by some to be nearby Henchir-Merelma. If these tentatively identifications are correct it would confirm the Antonine Itinerary description of them being way stations on the limes Africana Road.

== Bishopric ==
Terento is not on the lists of the Episcopal See and so it is presumed that the town was actually the cathedra for the diocese of Forontoniana.
