= Henchir-Merelma =

Henchir-Merelma is a locality and archaeological site in the Mahdia Governorate of Tunisia.

The ruins at Henchir-Merelma are near the Cherita River and Sebkhet de Sidi El Hani lakes and date from the time of the Roman Empire and is tentatively identified with Aelioe a civitas of the Roman Province of Byzacena.

According to the Antonine Itinerary, Aeliae was on the Roman Road from Althiburos To Thysdrus. Ruins at Ksour-el-Maïete tentatively identified with Germaniciana and Henchir-Bir-El-Menadla would indicate a series of way stations and accord with the description in the Antonine Itinerary.
