= Valentiniana =

Africa Proconsularis (125 AD)

Valentiniana was an ancient civitas of the Roman Province of Byzacena during the Roman Empire and late antiquity. The exact location of the town is unknown.

An ancient bishopric was centered on the town, which survives today as a titular bishopric of the Roman Catholic Church. The current bishop is Philip Pargeter.
