= Diocese of Thiges =

Roman Catholic diocese in Byzacena

The Diocese of Thiges (Latin: Dioecesis Thigensis) was a Roman Catholic diocese in ancient Byzacena.

== History ==
In late antiquity the diocese was centered on a civitas of the Roman Province of Byzacena, Africa Province. That ancient civitas is today identifiable with Bordj-Gourbata in today's Tunisia.

The diocese lasted until the Muslim conquest of the Maghreb, when it ceased to function effectively. However, the diocese was reborn in name at least in the early 20th century as a titular see. Today Tiges survives as a titular bishop's seat.

== Bishops ==
- The Catholic bishop Gallo spoke at the Carthage conference of 411. The diocese had a Donatist bishop at that time but he did not attend and his name is unknown.
- At the time of the meeting convened in Carthage by the Vandal king Huneric in 484, the diocese appears to be vacant.
- The bishop Romolo signed the synodal letter of the Carthaginian council of 641.
- Luis Del Rosario (1966 - 1970)
- Georg Moser (1970 - 1975)
- Eduardo Francisco Pironio (1975 - 1976)
- Eugeen Laridon (1976 - 1999)
- Stanisław Gębicki, 1999
