= Abidda =

Africa Proconsularis (125 AD)

Abidda is the name of an ancient Roman city in the Roman province of Africa proconsularis or in late antiquity in the province of Byzacena. The exact location of the town is not known for certain but it was in northern Tunisia; the ruins at Henchir-Ksour-Abbeda outside of Semta (Dzemda) has been suggested as its location. The Barrington Atlas of the Greek and Roman World did not venture to make the equation of the site with the late antique name, mapping and labeling the archaeological site with its modern name only, whence DARE

Abidda was the seat of an ancient bishopric and remains a titular see of the Roman Catholic Church to this day.
