= Jeníkov =

Jeníkov may refer to places in the Czech Republic:

- Jeníkov (Chrudim District), a municipality and village in the Pardubice Region
- Jeníkov (Teplice District), a municipality and village in the Ústí nad Labem Region
- Jeníkov, a village and part of Čechtice in the Central Bohemian Region
- Golčův Jeníkov, a town in Havlíčkův Brod District, Vysočina Region
- Větrný Jeníkov, a municipality and village in the Vysočina Region
