= Sebkha Kelbia =

Lake in Tunisia

Coordinates: 35.8427°N 10.2716°E

Designations

Ramsar Wetland
- Official name: Sebkhet Kelbia
- Designated: 7 November 2007
- Reference no.: 1710

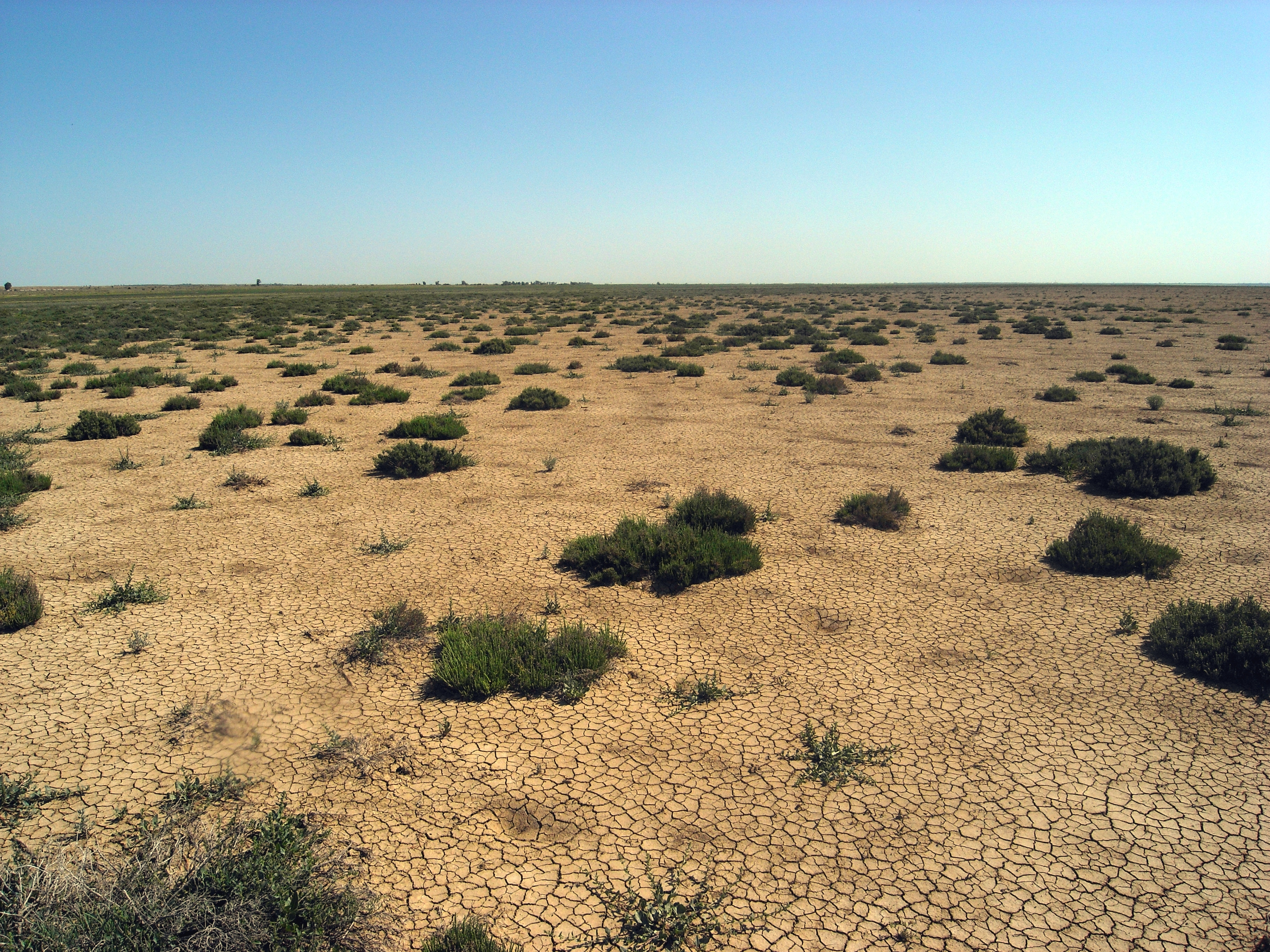
Sebkhat Kelbia, 2009.

The Sebkha Kelbia (سبخة الكلبية) is an intermittent lake in Tunisia that covers 8000 hectares in Sousse Governorate, at 35°50'34" north, 10°16'18" east, south of Kondar.

Considered the second most important wetland in the country after Lake Ichkeul, it is classified a nature reserve by decree of the Ministry of Agriculture of 18 December 1993. The Oued Nebhana, Oued Merguellil and Oued Zeroud rivers flow into the dry lakebed during rainfall season, but are now controlled by dams protecting the plain against the floods. The dams coupled with the operation of large agricultural irrigation schemes have had an environmental impact on the sebkha, which has not been studied to date. The agricultural population living around Sebkha Kelbia is estimated at 23,000 people.
