= Ksour-el-Maïete =

Ksour-el-Maïete is a set of ruins in Tunisia near the Cherita and the Sebkhet de Sidi El Hani lakes.

The ruins date from the Roman Empire and are tentatively identified as a station on the Roman Road from Althiburos To Thysdrus. According to one interpretation of the Antonine Itinerary, it is the site known in the Roman era as Germaniciana.
