= Diocese of Valeniniana =

Roman Catholic titular see

The Diocese of Valentiniana (Latin: Dioecesis Valentinianensis) was a Roman-Berber civitas located in the province of Byzacena. It was re-established in 1933 as a Roman Catholic titular see.

== History ==
Valentiniana, in today's Tunisia, is an ancient episcopal see of the Roman province of Byzacena. The Christian diocese was founded during the Roman Empire and survived through the Arian Vandal and Orthodox Byzantine empires, only ceasing to function with the Muslim conquest of the Maghreb. The diocese was re-founded in name at least in the 20th century and it remains today a titular see of the Roman Catholic church. Three bishops are known from antiquity in this diocese.

Valentiniana is now a titular bishop's ecclesiastical seat; the current titular bishop is Philip Pargeter. former auxiliary bishop of Birmingham.

== Known Bishops ==
- Thomas (mentioned in 451)who took part in the Council of Chalcedon in 451;
- Rogatian (mentioned in 484), who witnessed the synod gathered in Carthage by Huneric the Vandal king in 484, after which he was exiled.
- Rodibaldo (mentioned in 641), who took part in the antimonotelite council of 641.
- Charles Richard Mulrooney (1959 - 1989)
- Philip Pargeter, from 20 November 1989
