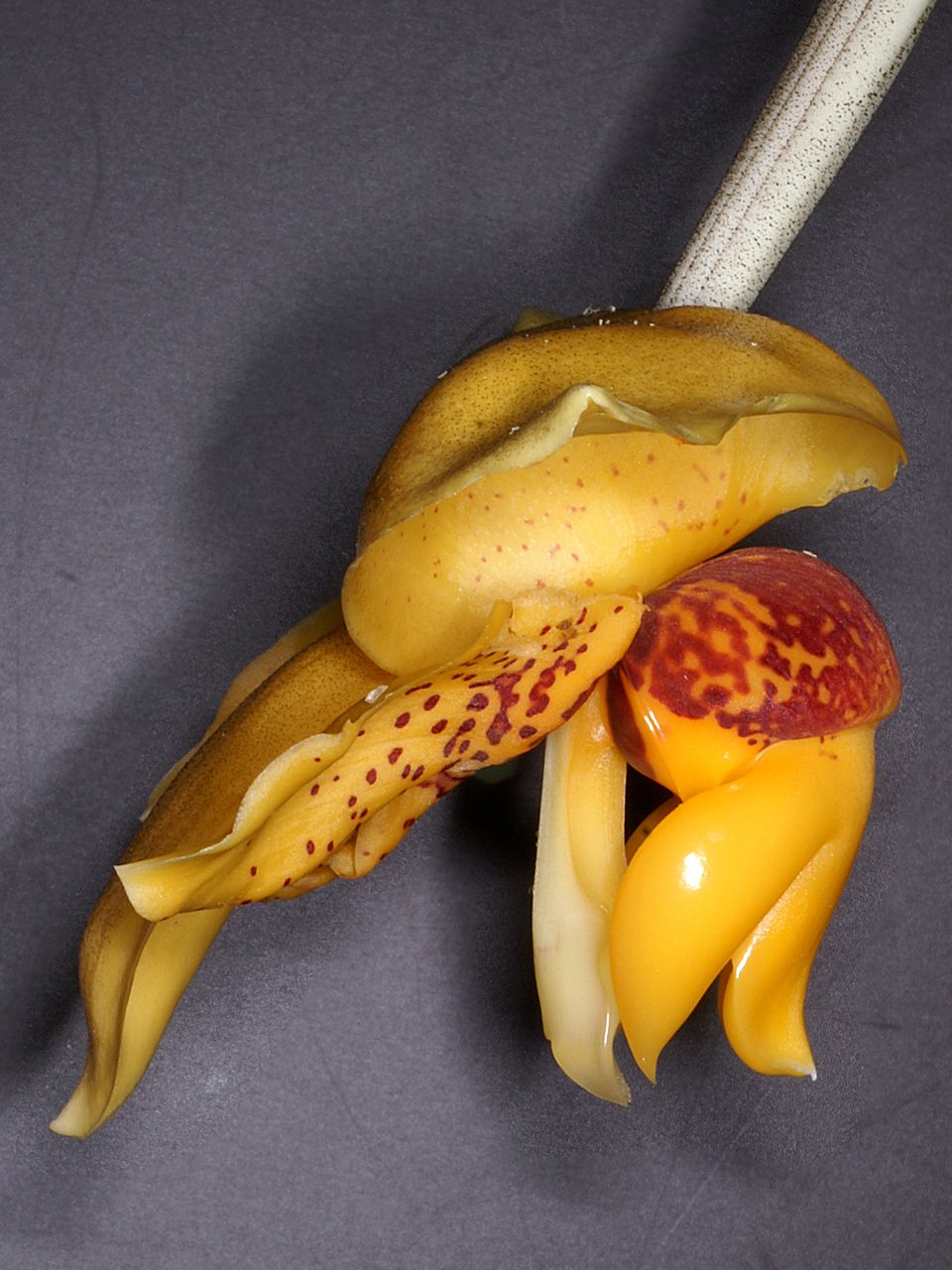
- Stanhopea connata flower

Scientific classification
- Kingdom: Plantae
- Clade: Tracheophytes
- Clade: Angiosperms
- Clade: Monocots
- Order: Asparagales
- Family: Orchidaceae
- Subfamily: Epidendroideae
- Genus: Stanhopea
- Species: S. connata

Binomial name
- Stanhopea connata Klotzsch

Synonyms
- Stanhopea aurata Beer; Stanhopea tadeasi Haager & Jeník

= Stanhopea connata =

Species of orchid

Stanhopea connata is a species of orchid found in Colombia, Ecuador, and Peru. The flowers range in size from 4.75 - 5.5 in (12 - 14 cm). They're found at altitudes from 1,000 to 2,000 meters, often growing on branches over water.

The flower is commonly known as "the grown-together stanhopea." The flowers are known for their distinctly pungent smell, especially as related to other orchids.
