= Auzegera =

Roman-Berber town

Africa Proconsularis (125 AD)

Auzegera was a Roman-Berber town in the province of Africa Proconsularis and in late antiquity Byzacena. It was a Catholic Church diocese.

The town has been tentatively identified with the ruins at Henchir-El-Baguel in modern Tunisia. It was during the Roman Empire on the Limes Tripolitanus, sitting astride a wadi named after the town.

Auzegera was also the seat of an ancient Catholic bishopric, under Carthage.

The diocese had two known bishops. Donato was a Donatist bishop at the conference of Carthage (411) as a Donatist representative of the city. There was no Catholic competitor. In 484 Villatico was among the Catholic bishops summoned to Carthage by the Vandal king Huneric. he was then sent into exile.

Today the bishopric survives as a titular see of the Roman Catholic Church. The current bishop is Juan Armando Pérez Talamantes.
