= Henchir-Bou-Doukhane =

Sfax District in Tunisia.

Henchir Bou Doukhane is a village in Sfax Governorate, Eastern Tunisia.

Henchir Bou Doukhane is close to the towns of Hamadet el Adghame, Hamadet ed Dokhane and Khecherma all of which are north of Sfax. Henchir ed Doukhane has an altitude of 89 meters above sea level.

The area is predominantly agricultural, and ancient ruins nearby have been tentatively identified with the Roman era town of Madarsuma.

== History ==
During the Roman Empire the town was a town of Byzacena known as Madarsuma.

The area was conquered by Roger II of Sicily in 1148 and occupied until 1156. Occupied by the Spanish, in the 16th century, before falling to the Ottomans. During World War II, the Axis powers operated in the area in the Tunisia Campaign of 1943. After World War II, the town as part of Tunisia was returned to France, before Tunisia gained independence in 1956.
