= Úhořilka =

- Municipality
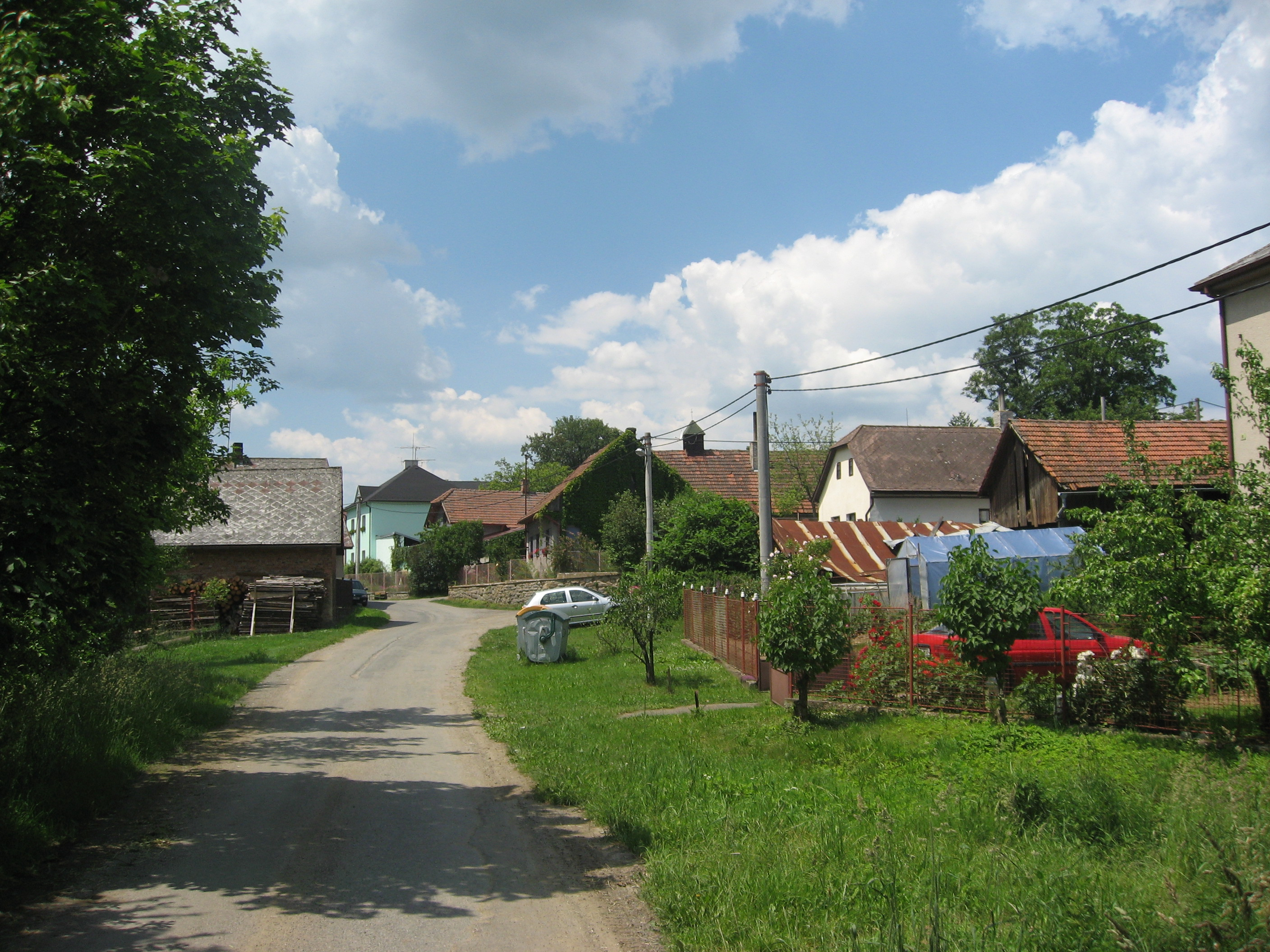
- Centre of Úhořilka

- Location in the Czech Republic
- Coordinates: 49°31′29″N 15°31′51″E
- Country: Czech Republic
- Region: Vysočina
- District: Havlíčkův Brod
- First mentioned: 1454

Area
  - Total: 2.54 km^{2} (0.98 sq mi)
- Elevation: 533 m (1,749 ft)

Population (2026-01-01)
  - Total: 53
  - Density: 21/km^{2} (54/sq mi)
- Time zone: UTC+1 (CET)
  - Summer (DST): UTC+2 (CEST)
- Postal code: 582 53
- Website: uhorilka.cz

Úhořilka is a municipality and village in Havlíčkův Brod District in the Vysočina Region of the Czech Republic. It has about 50 inhabitants.

== Etymology ==
The initial name of the village was Hořelka. The name was derived from the Czech verb hořet (i.e. 'burn'), referring to frequent fires in the village. The name was later distorted and from the beginning of the 17th century at the latest, it appeared as Úhořilka, due to the similarity with the word úhor (meaning 'uncultivated field').

== Geography ==
Úhořilka is located about 11 kilometres (7 mi) south of Havlíčkův Brod and 14 km (9 mi) north of Jihlava. It lies in the Křemešník Highlands. The highest point is at 581 m (1,906 ft) above sea level. There are several small fishponds in the municipality, fed by nameless streams.

== History ==
The first written mention of Úhořilka is from 1454, when it was acquired by the nobleman Mikuláš Trčka of Lípa. From the beginning of the 17th century until the establishment of an independent municipality in 1850, the village belonged to the Větrný Jeníkov estate.

== Demographics ==
Historical population

Year	Pop.	±%
1869	167	—
1880	170	+1.8%
1890	167	−1.8%
1900	149	−10.8%
1910	143	−4.0%

Year	Pop.	±%
1921	159	+11.2%
1930	161	+1.3%
1950	94	−41.6%
1961	79	−16.0%
1970	73	−7.6%

Year	Pop.	±%
1980	46	−37.0%
1991	45	−2.2%
2001	47	+4.4%
2011	48	+2.1%
2021	48	+0.0%

Source: Censuses

== Transport ==
There are no railways or major roads passing through the municipality.

== Sights ==
There are no protected cultural monuments in the municipality.
