= SEMTA (disambiguation) =

SEMTA or Semta may refer to:

Organizations

- Southeastern Michigan Transportation Authority, later renamed Suburban Mobility Authority for Regional Transportation
  - SEMTA Commuter Rail, a former commuter rail line in Detroit, Michigan
- Sector Skills Council for Science, Engineering and Manufacturing Technologies
- Serviço Especial de Mobilização de Trabalhadores para a Amazônia

Places

- Semta (Africa), a former Ancient city and bishopric in Africa Pronconsularis, now a Latin Catholic titular see
