= Dhorbania =

The Oued Nebhana area

Dhorbania, also known as Henchir Oued Nebhana, is a village and locality in Tunisia. It's also the site of Ancient city and former bishopric Bahanna, now a Latin Catholic titular see.

== Location ==
Dhorbania is in the Kairouan Governorate of Tunisia, North Africa. It is located at latitude 36.19392n and Longitude 10.02064e, in the hinterland of the Gulf of Hammamet, and south of Tunis. It is on the Oued Nebhana Stream, and it has a post code of 1160 in the Tunisian postal service.

== History ==
Ruins of the city include a Christian basilica, baptistry, an Olive press and a bridge over the stream.

The Arab general Uqba ibn Nafi lead Arab forces into the region in 670AD.

== Ecclesiastical History ==
Bahanna was important enough in the late Roman province of Byzacena to become one of the suffragan bishoprics of its capital Hadrumetum (modern Sousse)'s Metropolitan Archbishopric, but like most faded, presumably under Islam.

=== Titular see ===
The diocese was nominally restored in 1933 as Latin Catholic titular bishopric (Curiate Italian Baanna).

It had had the following incumbents, all of the fitting episcopal (lowest) rank :

- Noël Boucheix, S.M.A. (1969.01.01 – 1976.08.06)
- James Odongo (1964.11.25 – 1968.08.19) (later Archbishop)
- Philip James Benedict Harvey (1977.03.28 – 2003.02.02)
- Christopher Charles Prowse (2003.04.04 – 2009.06.18) as Auxiliary Bishop of Melbourne (Australia) (2003.04.04 – 2009.06.18); later Bishop of Sale (Australia) (2009.06.18 – 2013.09.12), Archbishop of Canberra and Goulburn (Australia) (2013.09.12 – ...)
- Thomas Vũ Đình Hiệu (2009.07.25 – 2012.12.24)
- Titus Joseph Mdoe (2013.02.16 – 2015.10.15)
- Volodymyr Hrutsa, C.Ss.R. (2016.01.16 – )

== Source and External links ==
- GCatholic, with titular incumbent bio links
