= Bouderies =

City in Kasserine Governorate, Tunisia

Bouderies بودرياس
- Settlement
- Interactive map of Bouderies
- Coordinates: 35.244°N 8.480°E
- Country: Tunisia
- Governate: Kasserine Governorate

Bouderies (Arabic: بودرياس) is a settlement in Kasserine Governorate, Tunisia, in North Africa, on the Algerian border north of Fériana. It is the site of a natural spring, nearby Mount Jebel ech Chambi, one of the highest points in Tunisia (1,544 metres), and Drua, a ruined castra of the Roman province of Byzacena.

During late antiquity the town was seat of a Christian bishopric. In 411, the towns bishop, Antonianus, attended the Council of Carthage with the Donatist delegation. The town survived until at least the Arab–Byzantine wars of 698AD.

The 1st Armored Division of the United States Army passed through Bouderies during World War II. Today the bishopric of Drua survives as a titular bishopric headed by John Joseph Jenik, auxiliary bishop of New York City.
