= Cariana =

The Diocese of Cariana (in Latin Rite Carianensis) is a home suppressed and titular see of the Roman Catholic Church. Cariana, in modern Tunisia, is the seat of the ancient episcopal see, which was originally a civitas of the Roman province of Byzacena.

== Bishops ==
- March 1968 – February 1969: Aníbal Muñoz Duque
