= Forontoniana =

Roman town during late antiquity

Africa Proconsularis (125 AD)

Forontoniana was a Roman town of the Roman province of Byzacena during late antiquity. The town has tentatively been identified with the ruins at Henchir-Bir-El-Menadla in modern Tunisia.

Forontoniana was also the seat of an ancient episcopal see of the Roman Catholic Church. The only known bishop of this diocese was Felix, who took part in the synod in Carthage in 484 called by the Vandal king Huneric, after which Felix was exiled. Today Forontoniana survives as a titular bishopric.

== Known Bishops ==
- Felix (mentioned in 484)
- Luigi Poggi (1965–1994)
- Pierfranco Shepherd (1994–2015)
- Dagoberto Campos Salas (2018- )
