= Oued Zeroud =

River in Tunisia

Oued Zeroud drainage basin.

Zeroud Oued (واد زرود) is a stream in central Tunisia at Latitude, it flows via Sebkhet Cherita Lake, into the Mediterranean Sea at the Gulf of Hammamet.

Its average course is forty kilometers even if the maximum length of its bed reaches 150 kilometers. It collects its water basin upstream by a series of wadis draining the Nara region and Jebel Tazza, all being retained by the dam Sidi Saad, located about 45 kilometers southwest of Kairouan. Downstream of the dam, a series of wadis flow into the Wadi Zeroud, flowing to a zone located about ten kilometers south-east of Kairouan where it ceases to be a single wadi and splits into several parts some of which joined the sebkha Kelbia.

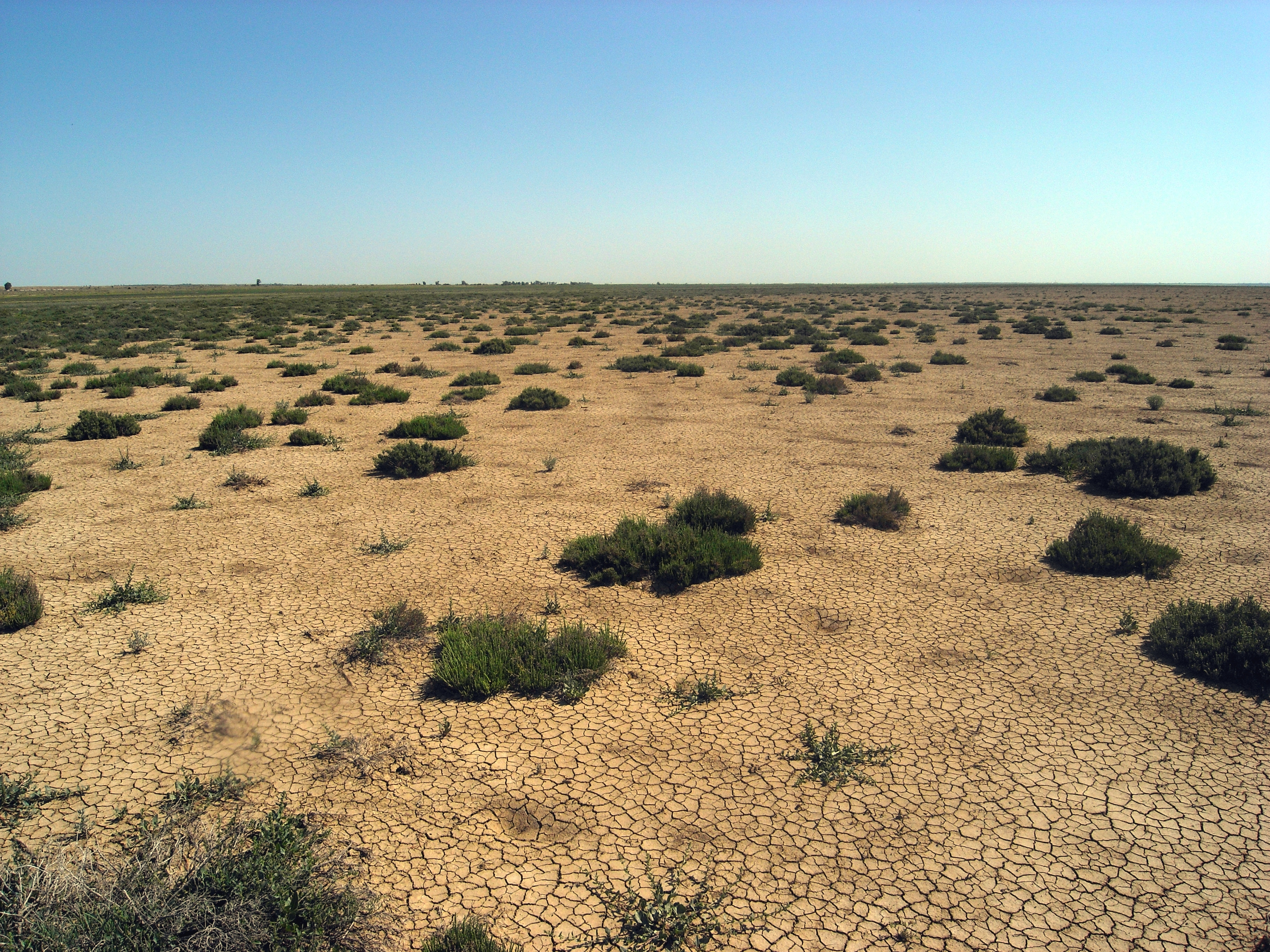
Sebkha Kelbia, 2009.

The rainfall reduced the region led to the near-absence of water in summer but also to floods in autumn, when rain falls during a short period of time. Construction of the dam has allowed the irrigation of farmland and helped prevent flooding, but, however, reduced the level of groundwater also overexploited.

During Roman times the area was intensely farmed.

== Sidi Saad Dam ==
Designations

Ramsar Wetland
- Official name: Barrage de Sidi Saad
- Designated: 2 February 2012
- Reference no.: 2018

The dam Sidi Saad (سد سيدي سعد) is a dam on the Oued Zeroud built in 1982, at 35°22'53" north, 9° 41'42" east between Nasrallah and Hajeb El Ayoun.

At a height of 82 meters, it can hold up to 120 million cubic meters of water in a reservoir with a surface area of 9000 hectares. It is used for flood mitigation and irrigation. On 2 February 2012, the dam Sidi Saad was recognized as a Ramsar site.
