= Madarsuma =

Africa Proconsularis (125 AD)

Madarsuma (in Latin: Dioecesis Madarsumitana) was a Roman town of the Roman province of Byzacena (North Africa) during the Roman Empire and into late antiquity. The city now lost to history remains only as a suppressed and titular see of the Catholic Church.

== Location ==
The actual location of Madarsuma is now lost to history but Henchir-Bou-Doukhane in today's Tunisia has been suggested as one possible candidate site.

== History ==
Only one bishop, Primulian, is known from this town. He participated in the Council of Cabarsussi, held in 393 by the Massimians, a sect dissident of the Donatists, and he signed his acts. he also intervened at the Conference of Carthage of 411, between Catholic and Donatist bishops of Roman North Africa.

The diocese was mentioned among the fourteen bishopric sites of Byzacena in the Notitiae Episcopatuum written by Byzantine Emperor Leo VI (886–912), indicating that the town survived the Muslim conquest of the Maghreb in the 7th century.

Today Madarsuma survives as a titular bishopric and the current bishop is Mario Fiandri, of El Petén.
