= Filaca =

Filaca was an ancient city in the Roman province of Africa Proconsularis and in late antiquity of Byzacena in what is today the Sahel region of Tunisia.

Filaca was also the seat of a former Roman Catholic Church diocese.

== History ==
The location of Filaca is unknown but was in the Roman province of Byzacena, what is today Southern Tunisia.

The bishopric centered on this ancient town was a suffragan of the Bishop of Carthage The only known bishop of this diocese was Bonifacio, who took part in the Council of Carthage in 484 called by the Vandal king Huneric, after which Bonifacio was exiled. Today Filaca survives as titular bishopric.

=== Known bishops ===
- Bonifacio (fl mentioned in 484)
- Clarence George Issenmann (7 October 1964 – 22 September 1966)
- Domingos de Pinho Brandão (6 December 1966 – 22 August 1988)
- Emil Aloysius Wcela (21 October 1988 – 21 May 2022)
