= Edistiana =

Africa Proconsularis (125 AD)

Edistiana was an ancient Roman–Berber city in the province of Africa Proconsularis and in late antiquity of Byzacena. It was located in the modern Tunisia. It was a former Catholic diocese.

Edistiana was a titular bishopric of the Roman Catholic Church.

Only one bishop of Edistiana is known, Miggin, a Donatist, at the Council of Carthage (411). Today Edistiana survives today as a titular bishopric; the current titular bishop is Johannes Kreidler of Rottenburg–Stuttgart.
