= Aeliae =

Roman-era city in Byzacena

Africa Proconsularis

Aeliae or Æliæ was a Roman-era city in the province of Byzacena.

The town must have been of some importance as it was made a bishopric early after the Council of Nicaea and it was a Catholic diocese throughout antiquity.

Its exact location is tentatively given as ruins near Henchir-Mraba southeast of Ouled Chamekh, between lake Sebkhet Cherita and Sebkhet de Sidi El Hani in the central part of what is today Mahdia Governorate, Tunisia.

Aeliae was also the seat of an ancient Christian bishopric. There are three bishops documented as residing in Aeliae during antiquity.

- The Catholic Fascinullo intervened at the Conference of Carthage of 411, between Catholic and Donatist bishops of Roman North Africa
- The Bishop Donaziano participated in the synod assembled in Carthage in 484 by the arian King Huneric the Vandal, after which Donaziano was exiled.
- Bishop Constantine took part in the anti-monotheistic Council of Carthage (641).

Since 1933 Aeliae has been a titular bishopric. Since 2019 the title has been held by Ricardo Augusto Rodríguez Álvarez, Auxiliary Bishop of Lima, Peru.
