= Aymen Soltani =

Tunisian association football player

Personal information
- Date of birth: December 1, 1987 (age 38)
- Place of birth: Dahmani, Tunisia
- Height: 1.89 m (6 ft 2 in)
- Position: Striker

Team information
- Current team: Club Africain
- Number: 14

Senior career*
Years	Team	Apps	(Gls)
–2005	Dahmani AC		
2005–2007	Étoile du Sahel	0	
2007–2008	Olympique Béja	3	
2008–2009	AS Kasserine	7	(3)
2009–2010	Olympique Béja	23	(9)
2010	ES Hammam-Sousse	9	(3)
2011–	Club Africain	21	(3)
- * Club domestic league appearances and goals

Aymen Soltani (أيمن السلطاني), born 1 December 1987 in Dahmani, is a Tunisian footballer who plays as a striker for Club Africain.
