= Muzuca in Byzacena =

Africa Proconsularis.

Muzuca was a Roman Town of the Roman province of Byzacena during late antiquity. The town has tentatively been identified with the ruins at Henchir-Besra in modern Tunisia. Very little is known of the city, though in situ epigraphical evidence gives us the name and that in late antiquity it achieved the status of Municipium.

Muzuca was also the seat of an ancient episcopal see of the Roman Catholic Church, survives as a titular bishopric.

There are three bishops attributable to this African diocese.

The Catholic Restituto and the Donatist Idassio took part in the Carthage conference of 411, which brought together the Catholic and Donatist bishops of Roman Africa.

Innocent attended the synod gathered in Carthage by the Vandal king of Hunaric in 484, after which he was exiled.

Today Muzuca di Bizacena survives as a titular bishop's seat; the current titular bishop is Luka Sylvester Gopep.

== See also ==
- Muzuca in Africa Proconsularis
