= Iubaltiana =

- Africa Proconsularis (125 AD).

- Location in Tunisia
- Coordinates: 35°40′N 10°05′E
- Country: Tunisia
- Governorate: Kairouan
- Elevation: 68 m (223 ft)

Iubaltiana was a Roman–Berber civitas (town) in the province of Africa Proconsularis and in late antiquity in Byzacena. The town has been tentatively identified with ruins near Kairouan in today's Tunisia.

Iubaltiana was also the seat of an ancient Christian bishopric, governed under the Bishop of Carthage. It was one of several bishoprics in what is today the Kairouan city area.

Today the bishopric survives as a titular see of the Roman Catholic Church and the current bishop is Luis Manuel Alí Herrera who succeeded Karl-Josef Rauber in 2015.
