= Cufruta =

Africa Proconsularis (125 AD)

Cufruta was an ancient Roman-Berber civitas in the province of Byzacena. It was also the seat of a Roman Catholic diocese.

Cufruta was located in what is modern Tunisia. It was home to a former titular see of the Roman Catholic Church.

There are two known bishops of this diocese. Feliciano took part in the Council of Carthage of 403 and the conference in the same city in 411. Then, among the Catholic bishops summoned to Carthage in 484 by the Vandal king Huneric was Eliodoro.

Today Cufruta survives as titular bishopric, and the current bishop is Przemysław Szulc, auxiliary bishop of Pelplin.

== Bishops ==
- Feliciano (403–411)
- Eliodoro (484)
- Stanislaus Joseph Brzana (1964–1968)
- József Kacziba (1969–1989)
- Tadeusz Pieronek (1992–2018)
- Arkadiusz Okroj (2019-2025)
- Przemysław Szulc (2026-)
