= Tanudaia =

Africa Proconsularis (125 AD)

The diocese of Tanudaia (in Latin: Dioecesis Tanudaiensis) is a suppressed and titular see of the Roman Catholic Church located in today's Tunisia.

Originally an ancient episcopal seat in the Roman province of Byzacena. Though not all authors agree with this attribution. The only known bishop of this African diocese is the Donatist Bishop Donato, who took part in the 411 Carthage conference, which saw the Catholic baptists and donators of Roman Africa together. The seat on that occasion had no Catholic bishops.

Tanudaia survives as a titular bishopric. Carlos Eugenio Irarrázaval Errázuriz was named titular bishop of Tanudaia but renounced the appointment before being consecrated a bishop.

Known bishops include:

- Donato (fl. 411) (Donatist)
- John Edgar McCafferty (1968– 1980)
- Wilfredo D. Manlapaz (1980–1986)
- Maximiano Tuazon Cruz (1987–1994)
- Joseph O. Egerega (1997–2013)
- Dante Gustavo Braida (2015–2018)
