= Fethia Khaïri =

- Born: 17 April 1918; Dahmani
- Died: 1986
- Citizenship: French protectorate of Tunisia, Tunisia
- Occupation(s): Singer, Actor

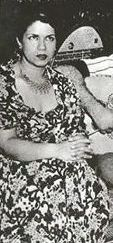
Fethia Khaïri

Fethia Khaïri (1918-1986) (Arabic: فتحية خيري) was a Tunisian singer and actress between 1940 and 1950. She was characterized by her soft voice and suave ability to change tone and register.

== Singing ==
In 1936, she recorded three successful songs:

- Zaâma ysafi eddahr,
- Hal kammoun mnein (a success of Chafia Rochdi) and
- Vous dansez madame (sung in French-Arabic).

== Acting roles ==
She quickly became a celebrity and the star of several acting troupes, including that of Fadhila Khetmi, especially in singing roles, at a time when the theater was the main leisure of the Tunisian public. She acted in several plays:

- Louis XI (son premier rôle)
- Le baiser mortel
- La main maléfique
- Hamdoun
- Les martyrs du patriotisme
- Ali Baba
- Les filles d'aujourd'hui
- Le fils du peuple
- Le gentil commissaire
- Wallâda et Ibn Zeydoun
- Cléopâtre
