= Ancusa =

Roman North Africa.

Ancusa was a city in the Roman-Berber province of Byzacena in modern Tunisia. The exact location of the civitas is unknown. The city was also the seat of an ancient Christian Bishopric which survives today as a titular bishopric of the Roman Catholic Church and the current bishop is Stephan Turnovszky of Vienna, Austria.
