= Trofimiana =

Africa Proconsularis (125 AD)

Trofimiana was an ancient Roman–Berber city in the Roman province of Africa Proconsularis and in late antiquity of Byzacena. It was located in the Sahel, Tunisia region.

The city was also the seat of an ancient bishopric of the Roman Catholic Church. It survives today as a titular see. The current bishop is Joseph V. Brennan who succeeded Pierre Nguyên Van Kham in 2015.
