= Garriana =

Africa Proconsularis (125 AD)

Garriana was a Roman town of the province of Byzacena during late antiquity. The town has tentatively been identified with the ruins at Henchir-El-Garra in modern Tunisia. The name Henchir-El-Garra simply means the Ruins of Garria.

Ancient Henchir-El-Garra was also the ecclesiastical seat of a Roman Catholic Church episcopal see. The only known bishop of this diocese was Secundus, who took part in the synod in Carthage in 484 called by the Vandal king Huneric, after which Secundus was exiled. Today Garriana survives as a titular bishopric and Edmar José da Silva of Brazil is the current bishop.
