= Mimiana =

Africa Proconsularis (125 AD)

Mimiana was a Roman town in the Roman province of Byzacena. The exact location of the town is not currently known.

== Bishopric ==
Mimiana was the center of an ancient Christian bishopric during the Byzantine Empire and Vandal Kingdom. There are only three modern bishops and only one ancient bishop known for the diocese.

- Bishop Robert Brahm
- Titular bishop: Bishop Simeon O. Valerio (1973–2003)
- Titular archbishop Henri Audrain (1968–1970)
- Titular bishop Georges-Auguste Louis (1965–1967)
- Secundianus of Mimiana, was one of the first victims of the persecution by Huneric the Arian, and who was beaten with clubs and sent into exile.
