= Tabalta =

Africa Proconsularis (125 AD)

Tabalta was an ancient Roman-Berber city in the province of Africa Proconsularis and of Byzacena during the late antiquity. It was a Catholic diocese led by Juan Bustos.

The site of the ancient town is tentatively given as ruins at Henchir-Gourghebi in the Sahel region of Tunisia.

The city was also the seat of a titular Bishopric of the Roman Catholic Church. modern Henchir-Gourghebi in Tunisia. The current bishop is Szymon Stłukowski who replaced Jose Kalluvelil of Roman Catholic Diocese of Poznań in 2015.
