= Emil Aloysius Wcela =

American priest and theologian (1931–2022)

The Most Reverend Emil Aloysius Wcela
- Auxiliary Bishop of Rockville Centre; Titular Bishop of Filaca
- Archdiocese: New York
- Diocese: Rockville Centre
- Appointed: October 21, 1988
- Installed: December 13, 1988
- Term ended: April 3, 2007
- Other post: Titular Bishop of Filaca (1988–2022)

Orders
- Ordination: June 2, 1956 by Thomas Edmund Molloy
- Consecration: December 13, 1988 by John R. McGann, James Joseph Daly, Alfred John Markiewicz

Personal details
- Born: May 1, 1931 Bohemia, New York, U.S.
- Died: May 21, 2022 (aged 91) Ronkonkoma, New York, U.S.
- Denomination: Roman Catholic

Styles of Emil Aloysius Wcela
- Reference style: His Excellency; The Most Reverend
- Spoken style: Your Excellency
- Religious style: Bishop

Emil Aloysius Wcela (May 1, 1931 – May 21, 2022) was an American prelate of the Roman Catholic Church. Wcela served as an auxiliary bishop of the Diocese of Rockville Centre in New York State from 1988 to 2007.

== Biography ==
=== Early life ===
Emil Wcela was born in Bohemia, New York, on May 1, 1931. He attended St. John Nepomucene School in Bohemia, then went to Seton Hall High School in Patchogue, New York. For his higher education, Wcela attended St. Francis College and Seminary of the Immaculate Conception in Huntington, New York.

=== Priesthood ===
Wcela was ordained a priest for the Diocese of Brooklyn on June 2, 1956. However, on April 6, 1957, he was incardinated, or transferred, to the Diocese of Rockville Centre.

After his ordination, Wcela was assigned as associate pastor of Maria Regina Parish in Seaford, New York. In 1959, he joined the faculty of St. Pius X Preparatory Seminary in Hempstead, New York, where he taught Latin; he also became chaplain of the Newman Club at Hofstra University. During this period, Wcela attended Fordham University, achieving a Master of Classical Studies degree.

In 1961, Wcela entered the Catholic University of America, where he received a Licentiate in Semitic Studies. He then studied at the Pontifical Biblical Institute in Rome, obtaining a Licentiate in Sacred Scripture. Wcela also studied at the École Biblique in Jerusalem.

In 1965, Wcela joined the faculty of the Seminary of the Immaculate Conception. He was appointed rector of the seminary in 1973. While serving at the seminary, Wcela in 1969 became the director of the continuing education program for priests. In 1979, Wcela was assigned as pastor at St. Joseph’s Parish in Garden City, New York. He took a sabbatical in 1987 to go to the Seminary of the Immaculate Conception.

On January 21, 1988, Wcela was appointed pastor of the new Resurrection Parish in Farmingville, New York. While serving as pastor, Wcela also served on the Priest Personnel Board, the Priest Personnel Policy Board, as advisor to the bishop on policy relating to priest assignments; and as a member of the Priest Senate. n 1980, Wcela was named a prelate of honor to Pope John Paul II, with the title, "Monsignor".

=== Auxiliary Bishop of Rockville Centre ===
On October 21, Pope John Paul II appointed Wcela as titular bishop of Filaca and auxiliary bishop of the Diocese of Rockville Centre. He was consecrated at St. Agnes Cathedral in Rockville Centre by Bishop John McGann on December 13, 1988. As auxiliary bishop, Wcela was vicar for the Eastern Vicariate of the diocese.

Wcela belonged to the following committees of the National Conference of Catholic Bishops:

- Committee on Pastoral Practices
- Ad Hoc Committee on the Age of Confirmation
- Administrative Board
- Committee on the Liturgy
- Lectionary Subcommittee
- Laity Committee’s Subcommittee on Lay Ministry
- Ad Hoc Committee on the Interdicasterial Instruction.

Wcela is the author of six books in a Bible study series, “God’s Word Today”, published by the Pueblo Publishing Company. He has also written articles and book reviews for America magazine, Catholic Biblical Quarterly and Bible Today. In 2004, Wcela published an article in America which he describes how young men were vetted and prepared for priesthood and wonders what the diocese could have done to screen out sexual predators.

== Retirement ==
On April 3, 2007, Wcela sent his letter of resignation to Pope Benedict XVI. On October 1, 2012, Wcela wrote an opinion piece in America magazine in which he advocated the ordination of women as deacons in the Catholic Church.

== Death ==
Wcela died on May 21, 2022, at St Pius X Residence For Retired Priests, Ronkonkoma. Visitation was at St. John the Evangelist Church in Riverhead, while his funeral was May 27, 2022, at St. John Nepomucene in Bohemia. He was buried in the parish cemetery.

== See also ==
- Catholic Church hierarchy
- Catholic Church in the United States
- Historical list of the Catholic bishops of the United States
- List of Catholic bishops of the United States
- Lists of patriarchs, archbishops, and bishops

== Episcopal succession ==
Catholic Church titles
Preceded by –	Auxiliary Bishop of Rockville Centre; 1988–2007	Succeeded by –
