= Sassura =

Africa Proconsularis (125 AD)

The Diocese of Sassura (Latin: Dioecesis Sassuritana) is a suppressed and titular see of the Roman Catholic Church. The Roman Town of Sassura, identifiable with Henchir-Ez-Zaouadi in today's Tunisia, is the ancient episcopal seat of the diocese which was in the Roman province of Byzacena.

They are just two of Sassura's documented bishops.

- Servius intervened in the synod assembled in Carthage in 484 by King Huneric the Vandal, after which Servius was exiled.
- Bonifacio took part in the anti-monotheistic council of 641.

Today Sassura survives as a titular bishopric and the current bishop is Rupert Graf zu Stolberg, auxiliary bishop of Munich and Freising.
