= Guedah el Baguel =

Guedah al Baguel is a locality in Tunisia found at latitude 33.65 and longitude 9.56.

At the nearby Henchir Guedah el Baguel are the remains of a Roman town.
