= Dahmani =

Dahmani (الدهماني) Althiburos
- Commune and town
- Nickname: Abbah Quşūr
- Location in Tunisia
- Coordinates: 35°56′41″N 8°49′57″E
- Country: Tunisia
- Governorate: Kef Governorate

Government
  - Mayor: Tarak Sahli (Nidaa Tounes)
- Elevation: 2,030 ft (620 m)

Population (2014)
  - Total: 30.720
- Time zone: UTC+1 (CET)
- Postal code: 7170

Dahmani, formerly Abbah Quşūr (alternative spellings Abbah Qusur or Ebba Ksour), is a town and commune in the Kef Governorate, Tunisia. As of 2004 it had a population of 14,061. It is located at 625 meters above sea level, 225 kilometers southwest of Tunis.

== Etymology ==
Ebba-Ksour is the old name of the region where Dahmani is located. The name "Ebba" is believed to derive from the Berber word for "water source" or "spring," while "Ksour" means "villages" or "fortified towns." Therefore, Ebba-Ksour roughly translates to "water source villages" or "fortified spring towns." The town of Dahmani has been inhabited for thousands of years and has a rich history that spans many civilizations.

== History ==
Near the village known today as Medeina, 9 km to the southwest, is the archaeological site of Althiburos an ancient numidian city, and former Roman town hall.

From 1941 on, it became a parish of the Roman Catholic Archdiocese of Tunis. In 1943 it accommodated the American troops engaged in the combat on the African front during World War II.

It was an important center of olive oil production during the Roman period, and some ruins of Roman villas and baths can still be seen in the surrounding countryside. During the Arab conquest of North Africa in the 7th century, Dahmani was one of the first towns in the region to embrace Islam. The town played a significant role in spreading the religion, and many scholars and Sufi masters lived in Dahmani during this period. In the 14th century, the town was ruled by the Hafsids, a Berber dynasty that controlled much of North Africa. They built several mosques and madrasas (Islamic schools) in Dahmani, including the Al Atiq Mosque, which still stands today.

During the Ottoman period, which began in the 16th century, Dahmani became a center of agriculture and trade. The Ottomans built a fort in the nearby town of El Kef, which helped to secure the region and promote commerce. Dahmani benefited from this period of stability, and many of its inhabitants became wealthy merchants. In the 19th century, Tunisia came under French colonial rule, and Dahmani was incorporated into the new administrative region of El Kef.

The French built several public buildings in the town, including a post office and a school, which helped to modernize the area. After Tunisia gained independence in 1956, Dahmani remained a small rural town, with a predominantly agricultural economy.

However, in recent years, the town has begun to develop its tourism industry, and many visitors now come to explore its natural beauty and cultural heritage.

== Economy ==
Its main activity is agriculture, and in particular the production of wheat: it houses the largest wheat silos in central Tunisia. Dahmani is also known for its other resources:

- Quarries of stone, sand, marble and clay
- Sheepskins and wool
- Wood and forest plants
- Mineral and thermal water resources
- Mines of iron, phosphate and carbonate

== Sports ==
The Dahmani Athletic Club, founded in 1932, is a football club based in Dahmani, Tunisia. The club's colors are yellow and black. The club has participated in the Coupe de Tunisie since the 2017-2018 season, with its best result obtained in 2017-2018, when it reached the second round.

== Politics ==
Dahmani has a mayor. Recent mayors include:

- 1970-1975: Abderrahim Zouari
- 1980-2010: Hamadi Tebai
- 2013-present: Mohamed Hédi Ben Madhi

== Landmarks ==
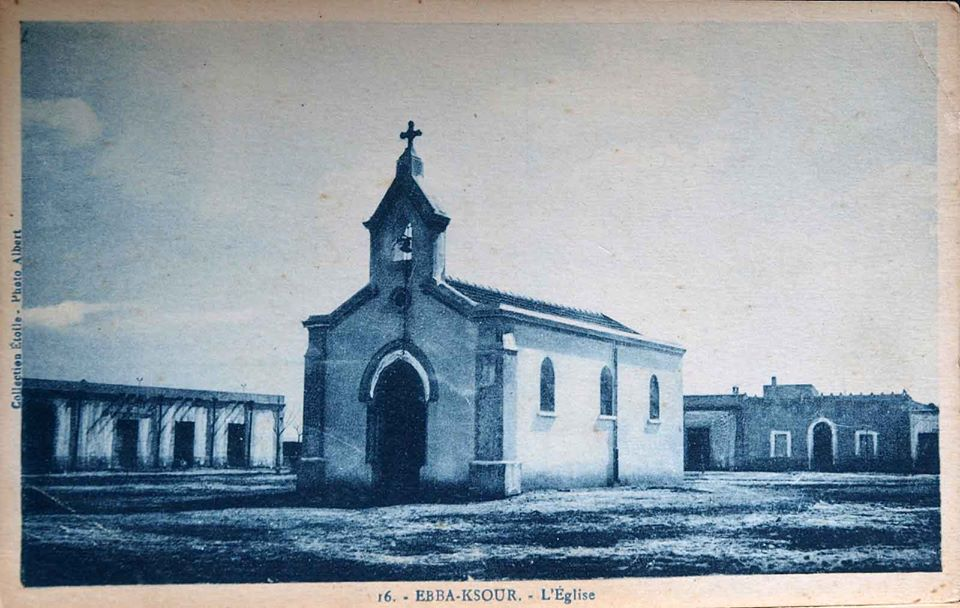
Ebba Ksour church in 1930

- The church of Ebba Ksour, located in the city of Dahmani (formerly Ebba Ksour), is a Catholic church built during the French protectorate. Ceded to the Tunisian government in 1964, it is now a dwelling house.
- The Dahmani meteorite is a 18kg meteorite that fell in May 1981 in Tunisia. It was observed by villagers in the Dahmani region (Kef governorate) and recovered by French soldiers who went to the site and then handed over to the geological service of Tunis. The meteorite is listed by the Laboratory of Mineralogy-Crystallography, associated with the CNRS in Paris, the Laboratory of Mineralogy of the National Museum of Natural History of Paris and the famous Meteoritical Society.

== Notable people ==
- Slama Kasdaoui, Tunisian footballer
- Fethia Khaïri, Tunisian actress
- Aymen Soltani, Tunisian footballer
- Abderrahim Zouari, Tunisian politician
- Fawzia Zouari, Tunisian journalist

== Population ==
2014 Census (Municipal)
Homes	Families	Males	Females	Total
3969	3484	6539	6701	13240
