= Větrný Jeníkov =

- Market town
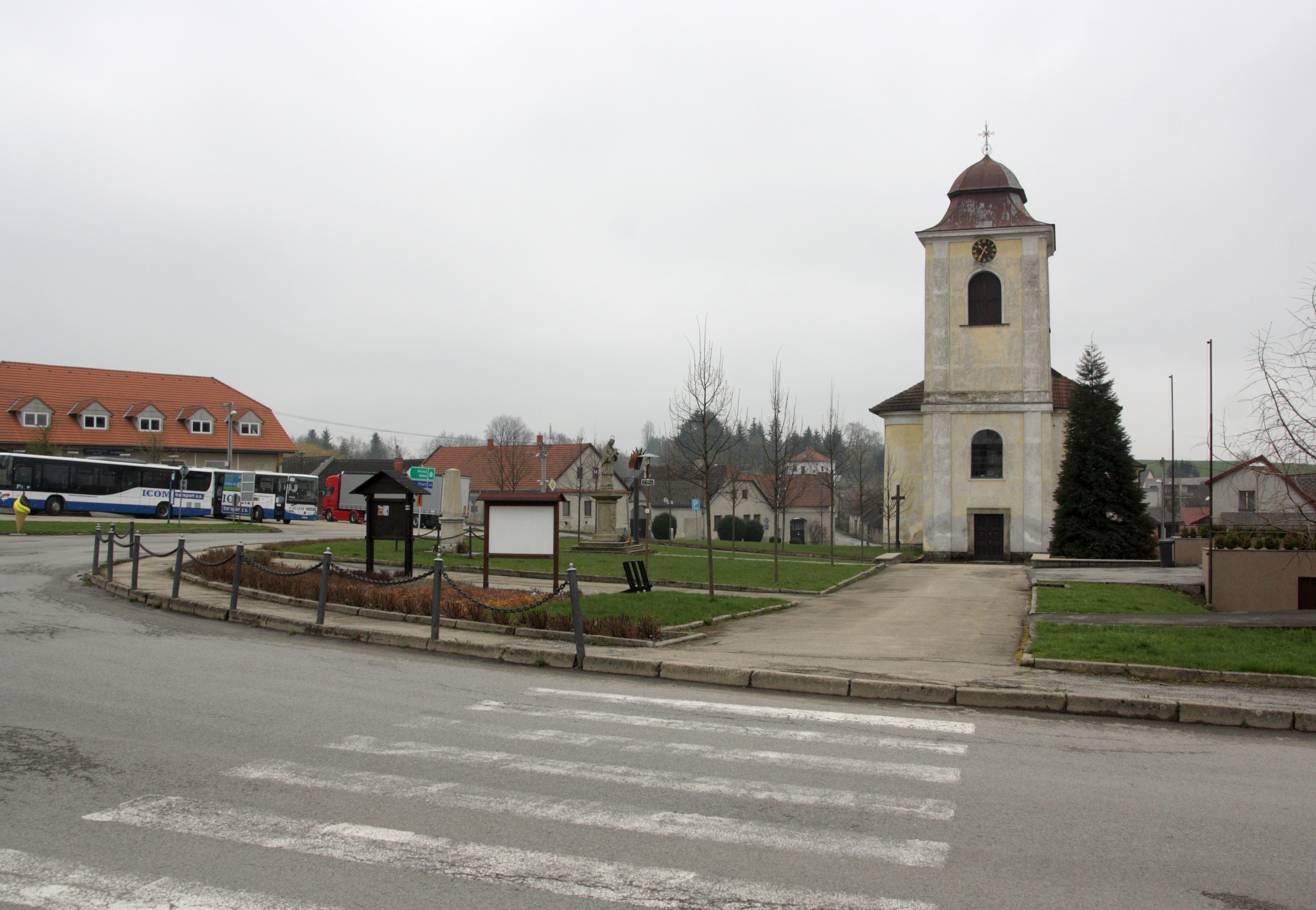
- Town square

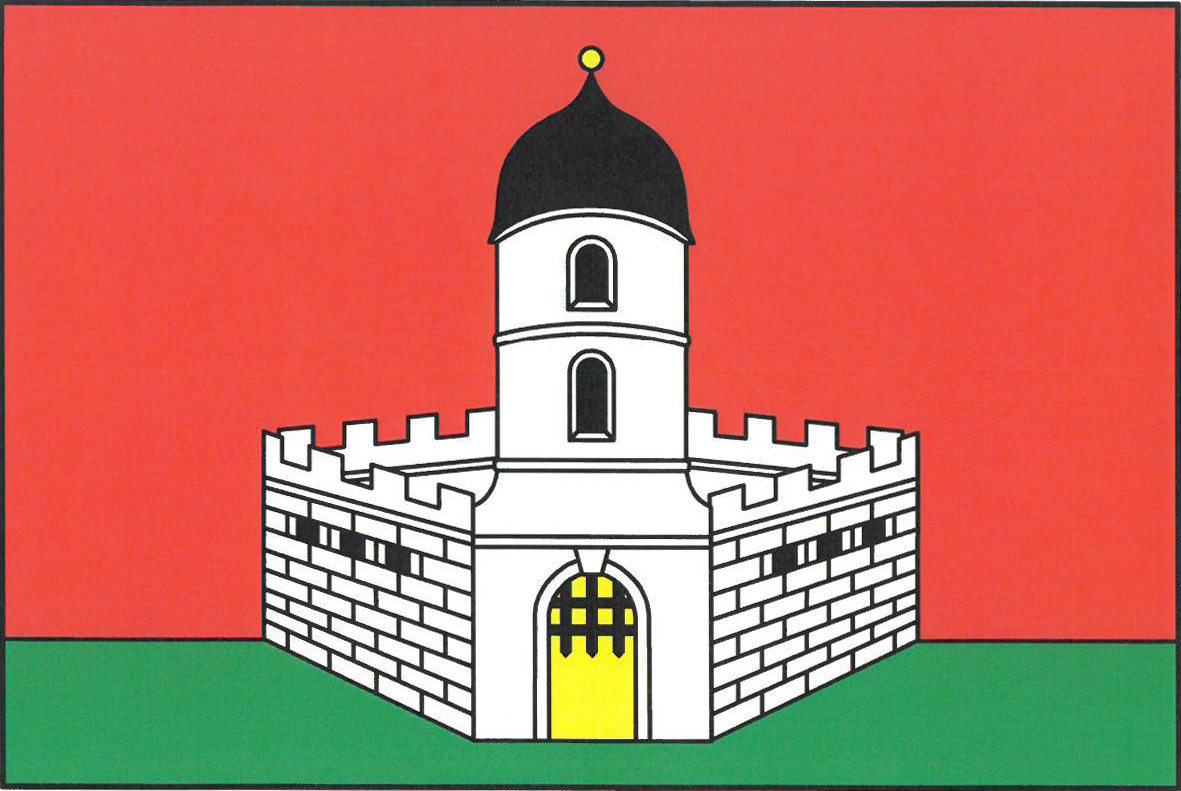
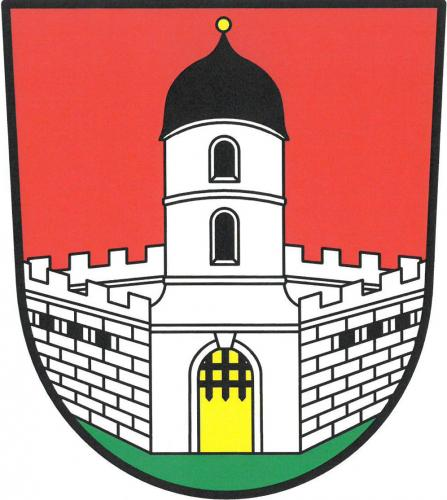
- Flag Coat of arms

- Location in the Czech Republic
- Coordinates: 49°28′33″N 15°28′44″E
- Country: Czech Republic
- Region: Vysočina
- District: Jihlava
- First mentioned: 1226

Area
  - Total: 12.22 km^{2} (4.72 sq mi)
- Elevation: 665 m (2,182 ft)

Population (2026-01-01)
  - Total: 650
  - Density: 53/km^{2} (140/sq mi)
- Time zone: UTC+1 (CET)
  - Summer (DST): UTC+2 (CEST)
- Postal code: 588 42
- Website: www.vetrnyjenikov.eu

Větrný Jeníkov (Czech pronunciation: [ˈvjɛtr̩niːˈjɛɲiːkof]; German: Windig Jenikau) is a market town in Jihlava District in the Vysočina Region of the Czech Republic. It has about 700 inhabitants.

== Administrative division ==
Větrný Jeníkov consists of two municipal parts (in brackets population according to the 2021 census):

- Větrný Jeníkov (604)
- Velešov (16)

== Etymology ==
The name Jeníkov is derived from the personal name Jeník, meaning "Jeník's (court)". In 1602, the name first appeared as Větrný Jeníkov ('windy Jeníkov').

== Geography ==
Větrný Jeníkov is located about 10 kilometres (6 mi) northwest of Jihlava. It lies in the Křemešník Highlands. The highest point is a hill at 702 m (2,303 ft) above sea level. There are several fishponds around the market town.

== History ==
The first written mention of Jeníkov is from 1226. In 1346, the village was promoted to a market town. From 1436 to the 1570s, Jeníkov was owned by the Trčka of Lípa family. Since 1572, the market town has been called Větrný Jeníkov. Between 1619 and 1635, it was again owned by the Trčkas of Lípa, but their properties were confiscated as a result of the Battle of White Mountain.

Around 1660, Větrný Jeníkov was acquired by the Trauttmansdorff family. In 1719–1744, the estate was a property of Knight Jan of Minetti. During his rule, the market town prospered. There was the development of guilds and the construction of representative buildings. Based on Minetti's will, the estate was inherited in 1744 by Vlašský špitál, which was a charity organisation in Prague.

The village of Velešov was founded around 1300, but was completely destroyed in 1421 (during the Hussite Wars). A new settlement was founded near Větrný Jeníkov in 1730 and was named Velešov after its predecessor.

== Demographics ==
Historical population

Year	Pop.	±%
1869	1,234	—
1880	1,166	−5.5%
1890	1,119	−4.0%
1900	981	−12.3%
1910	904	−7.8%

Year	Pop.	±%
1921	834	−7.7%
1930	768	−7.9%
1950	573	−25.4%
1961	605	+5.6%
1970	540	−10.7%

Year	Pop.	±%
1980	525	−2.8%
1991	607	+15.6%
2001	611	+0.7%
2011	611	+0.0%
2021	620	+1.5%

Source: Censuses

== Transport ==
There is no railways or major roads passing through the market town. The D1 motorway from Prague to Brno runs north of Větrný Jeníkov, beyond the municipal borders.

== Sights ==
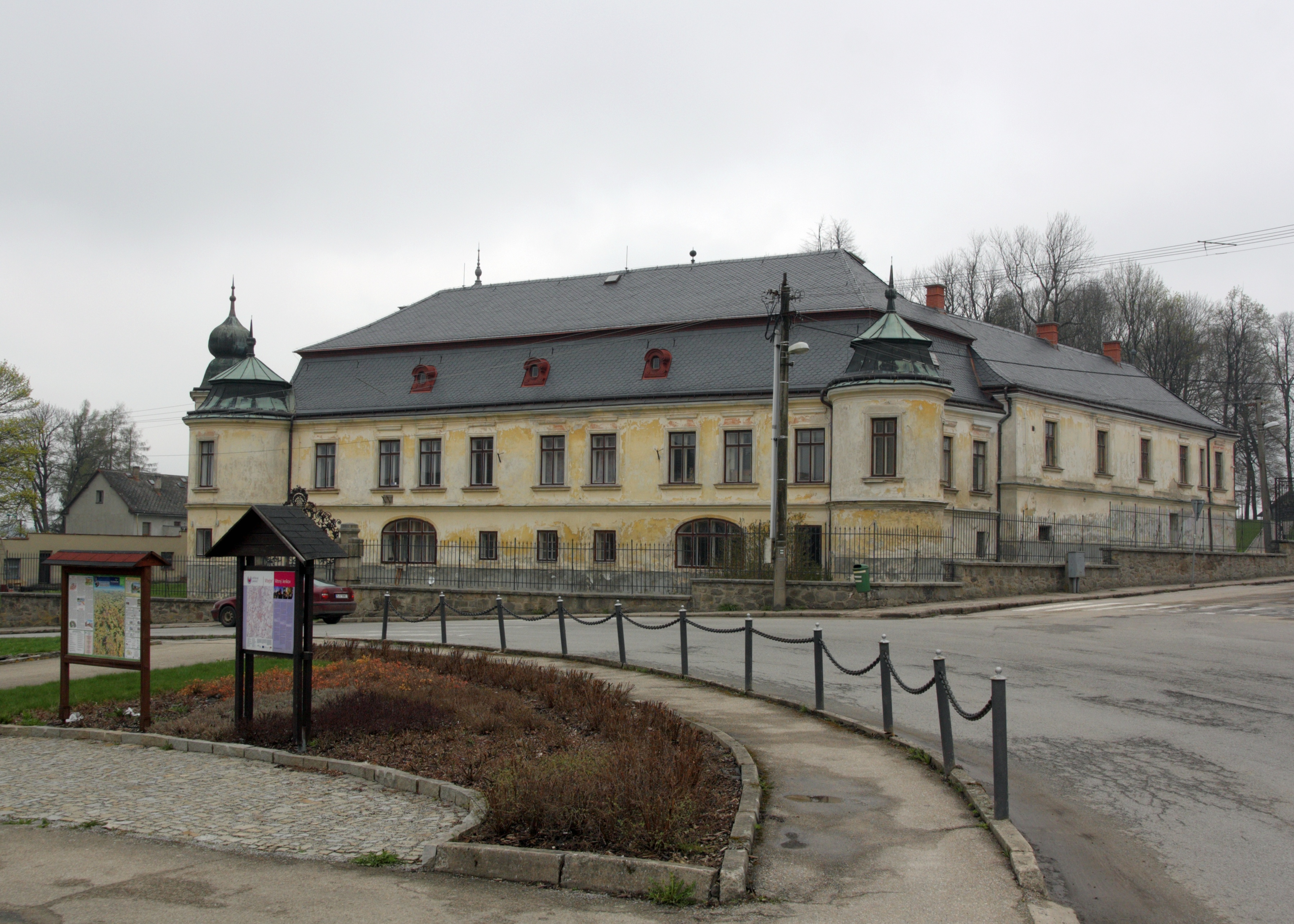
Větrný Jeníkov Castle

The Church of the Nativity of the Virgin Mary is a small rural church. It was built in the Baroque style in 1720–1735.

The castle was originally a fortress, rebuilt into a Baroque aristocratic residence in 1723–1729. In 1904–1907, it was rebuilt into its present Neo-Baroque form. Today it houses the municipal office.

The Jewish cemetery is located in the southern part of the municipal territory. It was founded in the first half of the 17th century. The oldest preserved tombstone dates from 1652.

The main landmark of Velešov is a belfry from 1829.
