= Aquae Regiae =

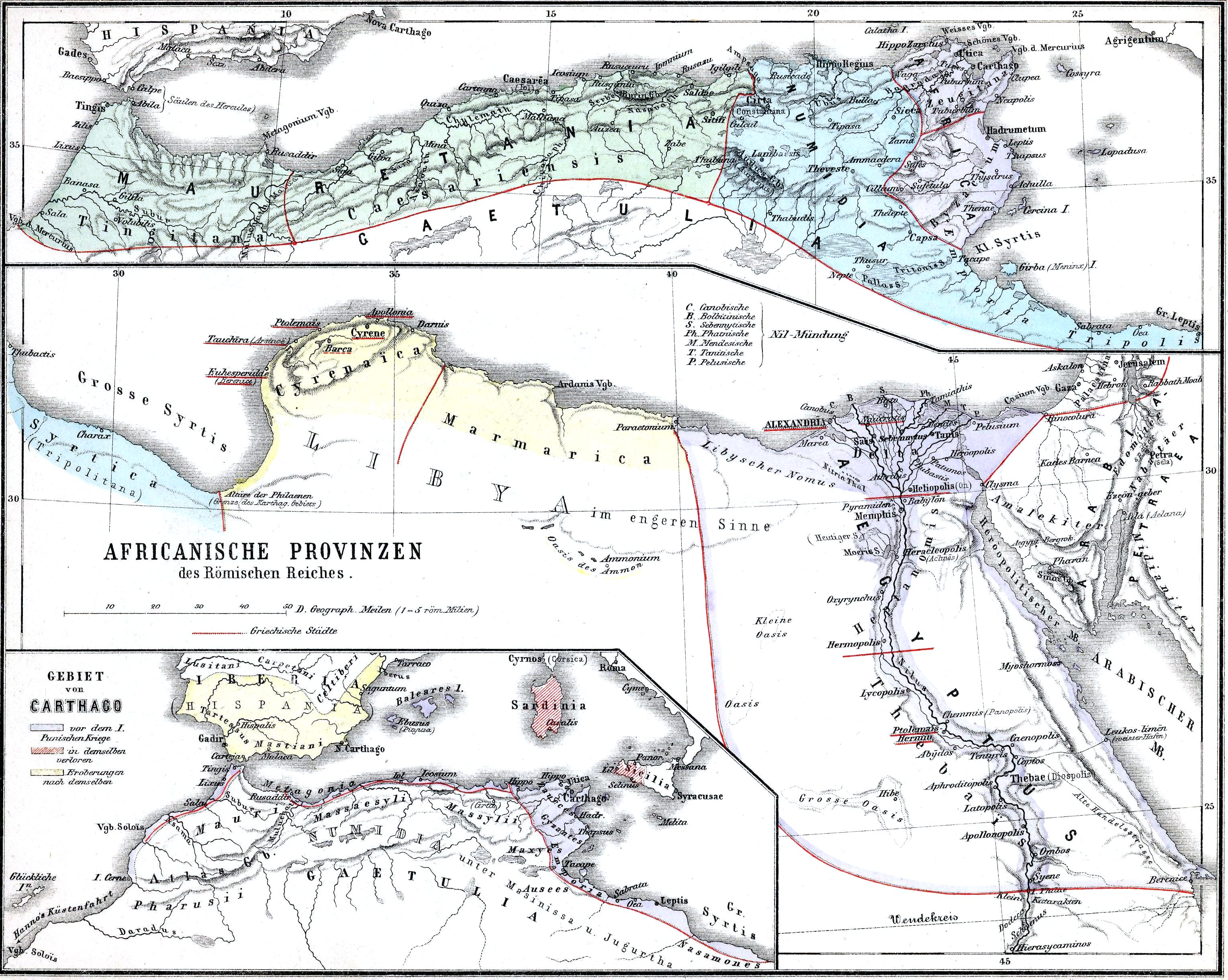
Roman Africa.

Aquae Regiae was a Roman town in the Roman province of Byzacena, during the Roman Empire and into late antiquity. The Latin adjective referring to it is Aquaregiensis.

== History ==
The bishop of this town, Maximianus, participated in the 411 Carthage conference, between the Catholic bishops and Donatist bishops of Africa and was at the other Carthaginian council of 419. Another bishop was among the Catholic prelates summoned in 484 to Carthage by the Arian king of the Vandals, Huneric. The bishop of the town was exiled after this conference.

Today Aquae Regiae survives as a titular bishopric of the Roman Catholic Church and the current bishop is Robert Charles Evans, auxiliary bishop of Providence.

=== Known bishops ===
- Maximianus (411–419)
- Liberatus (fl484)
- William Joseph McDonald † (17 March 1964 Appointed – 7 January 1989 died)
- György-Miklós Jakubínyi (14 March 1990 appointed – 8 April 1994 Appointed, Archbishop of Alba Iulia)
- Guillermo José Garlatti (27 August 1994 appointed – 20 February 1997 Appointed, Bishop of San Rafael)
- Martin Drennan (28 May 1997 appointed – 23 May 2005 Appointed, Bishop of Galway and Kilmacduagh)
- Alfonso Cortés Contreras (24 June 2005 appointed – 10 July 2009 Appointed, Bishop of Cuernavaca, Morelos)
- Robert Charles Evans (15 October 2009 appointed - current)
