= Jeníkov (Chrudim District) =

- Municipality
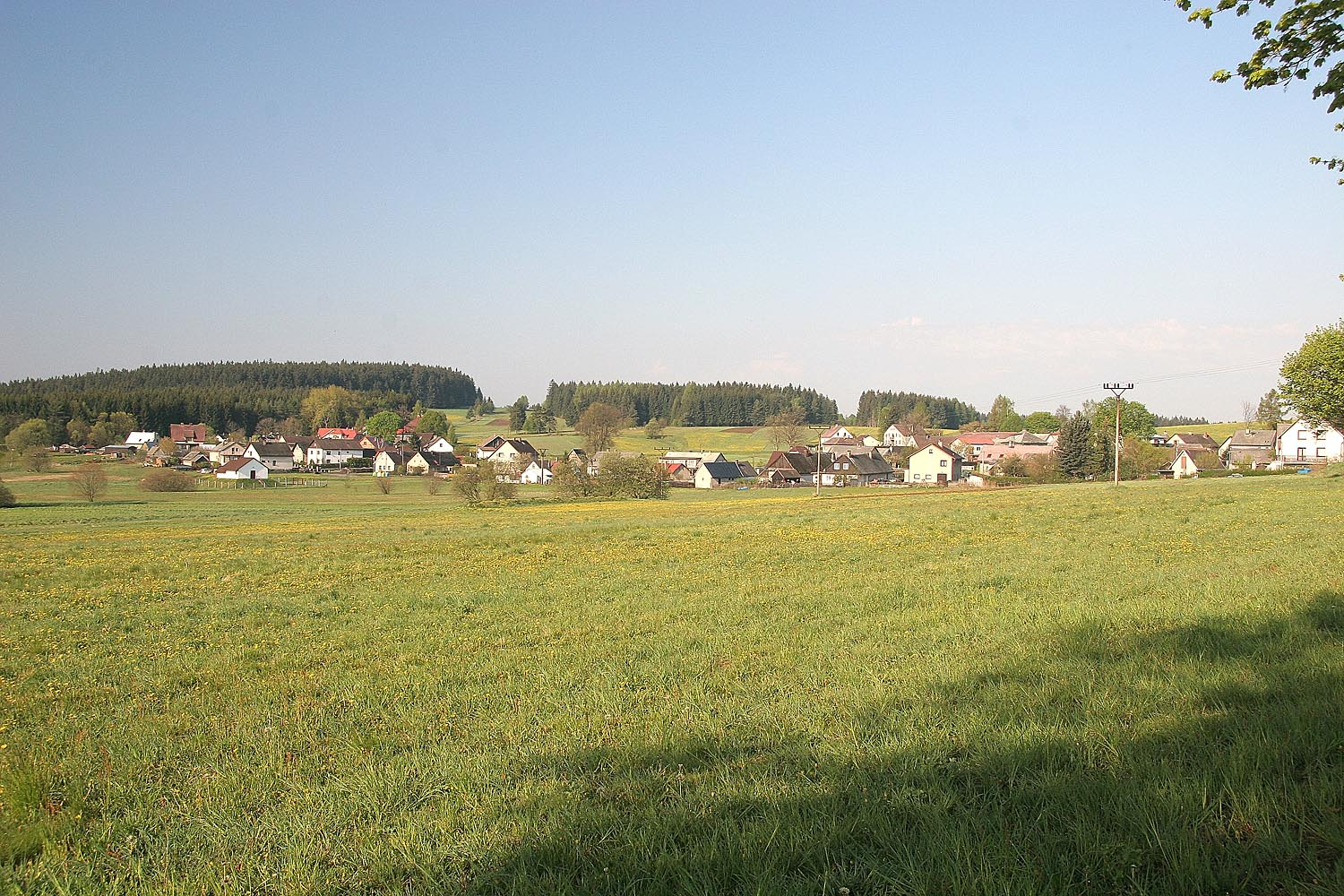
- View from the east

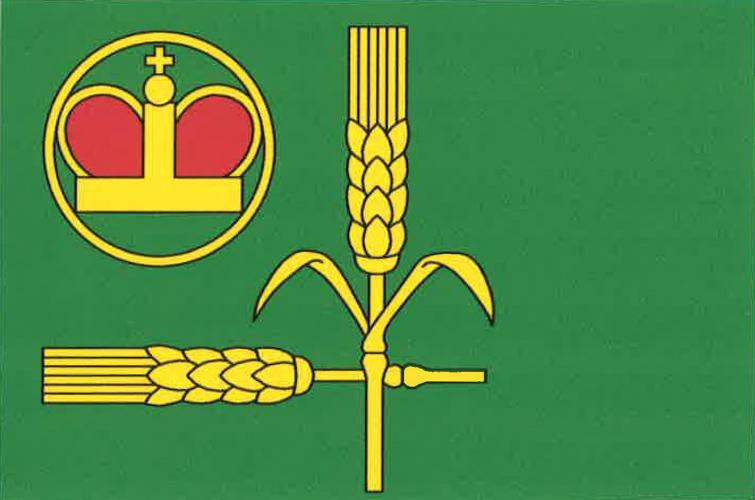
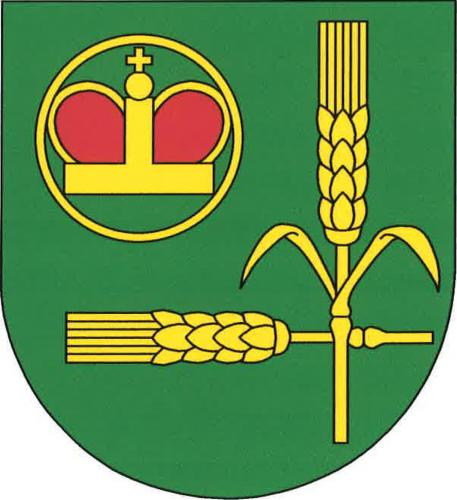
- Flag Coat of arms

- Location in the Czech Republic
- Coordinates: 49°44′33″N 15°57′27″E
- Country: Czech Republic
- Region: Pardubice
- District: Chrudim
- First mentioned: 1392

Area
  - Total: 5.82 km^{2} (2.25 sq mi)
- Elevation: 648 m (2,126 ft)

Population (2026-01-01)
  - Total: 459
  - Density: 78.9/km^{2} (204/sq mi)
- Time zone: UTC+1 (CET)
  - Summer (DST): UTC+2 (CEST)
- Postal code: 539 01
- Website: www.obec-jenikov.cz

Jeníkov is a municipality and village in Chrudim District in the Pardubice Region of the Czech Republic. It has about 500 inhabitants.

== Demographics ==
Historical population
Year	Pop.	±%
1869	539	—
1880	554	+2.8%
1890	583	+5.2%
1900	565	−3.1%
1910	572	+1.2%
1921	558	−2.4%
1930	595	+6.6%
1950	497	−16.5%
1961	527	+6.0%
1970	500	−5.1%
1980	453	−9.4%
1991	445	−1.8%
2001	474	+6.5%
2011	469	−1.1%
2021	446	−4.9%
Source: Censuses
