= Byzacena =

Roman province located in modern-day Tunisia

Provincia Byzacena ἐπαρχία Βυζακινῆς
- Province of the Late Roman Empire - Byzantine Empire
- 293–439; 534–698
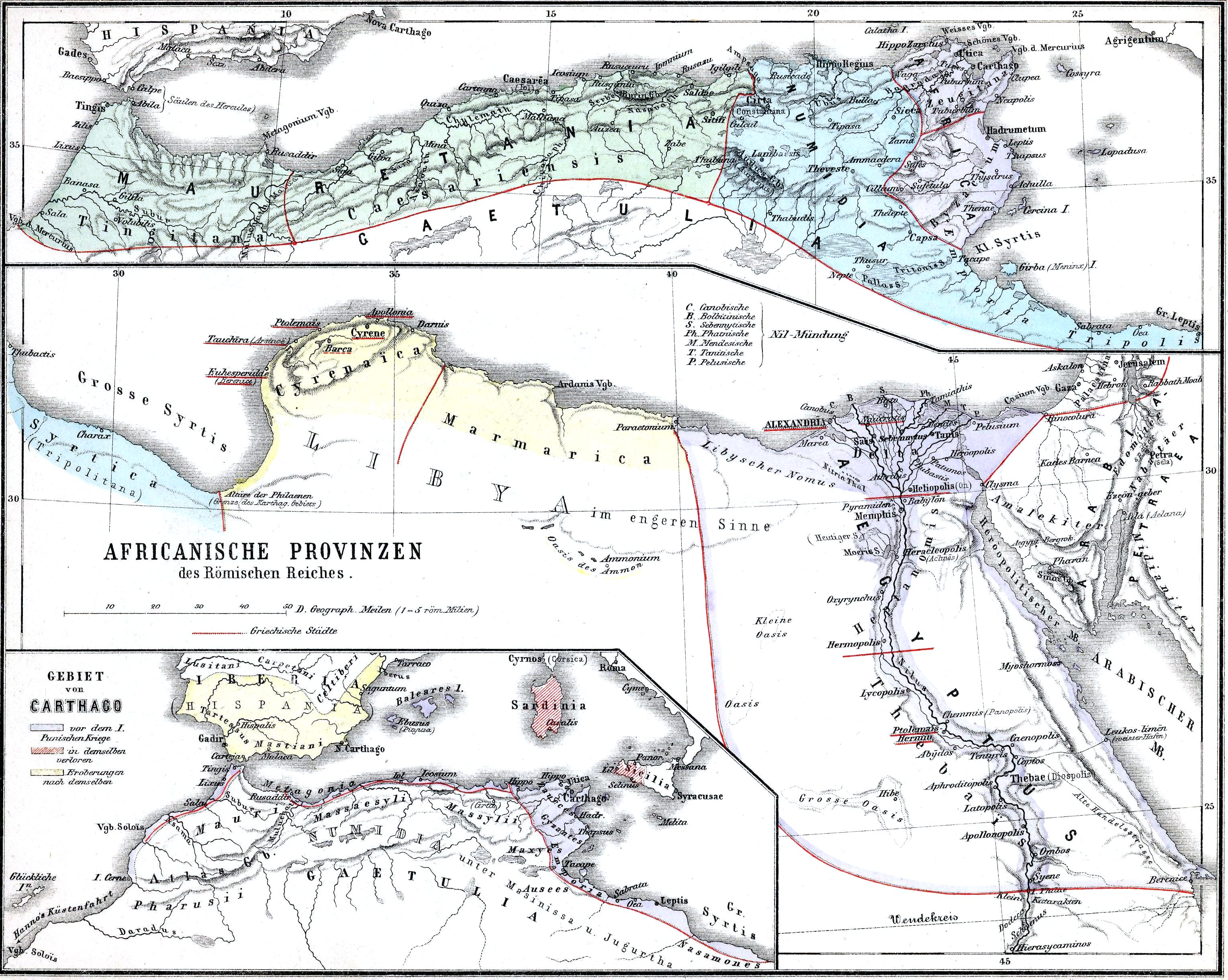
- Map of Roman Africa and Egypt; Byzacena shown in top right.

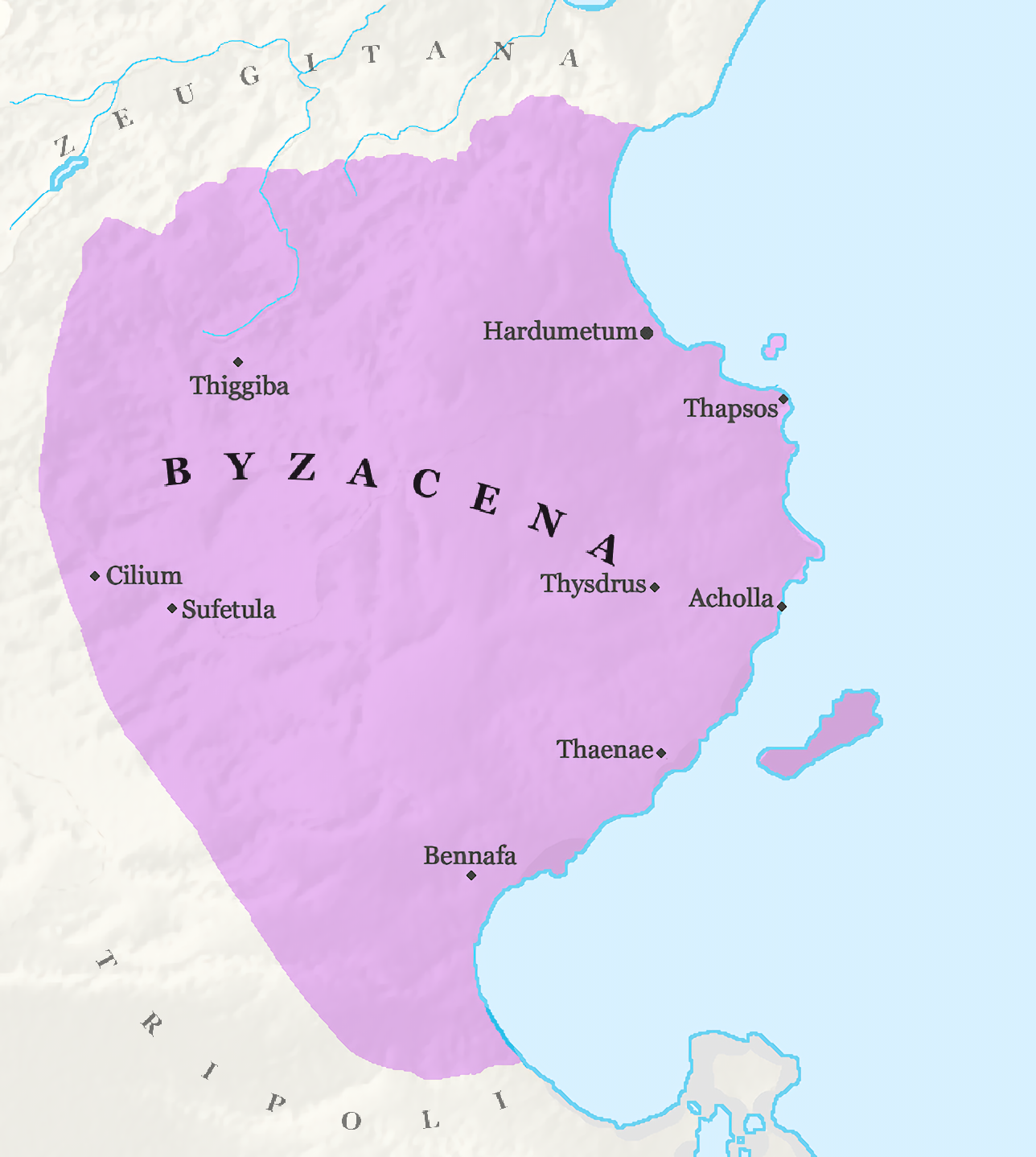
- The Province of Byzacena, showing its territorial extent, capital and major cities.
- Capital: Hadrumetum
- Historical era: Late Antiquity - Early Middle Ages
  - Division by Diocletian: c. 293
  - Vandal Conquest of Carthage: 439
  - Byzantine reconquest by Vandalic War: 534
  - Reorganization into the Exarchate: 591
  - Fall of Carthage: 698
Preceded by	Succeeded by
Africa (Roman province); Vandal Kingdom	Vandal Kingdom; Ifriqiya
- Today part of: Tunisia

Byzacena (or Byzacium; Ancient Greek: Βυζάκιον, romanized: Byzakion) was a Late Roman province in the central part of Roman North Africa, which is now roughly Tunisia, split off from Africa Proconsularis.

== History ==
At the end of the 3rd century AD, the Roman emperor Diocletian divided the great Roman province of Africa Proconsularis into three smaller provinces: Zeugitana in the north, still governed by a proconsul and referred to as Proconsularis; Byzacena to its adjacent south, and Tripolitania to its adjacent south, roughly corresponding to southeast Tunisia and northwest Libya. Byzacena corresponded roughly to eastern Tunisia or the modern Tunisian region of Sahel.

Hadrumetum (modern Sousse) became the capital of the newly made province, whose governor had the rank of consularis. At this period the Metropolitan Archbishopric of Byzacena was, after the great metropolis Carthage, the most important city in Roman (North) Africa west of Egypt and its Patriarch of Alexandria.

The toponym is believed to derive from the Byzantes or Byzacii, a Libyan people who lived around the Gulf of Gabès (Lesser Syrtis). They are called Gyzantes or Zygantes by Herodotus.

== Episcopal sees ==
Ancient episcopal sees of Byzacena listed in the Annuario Pontificio as titular sees:

- Abaradira
- Abari
- Abidda (ruins of Ksour-Abbeda)
- Acholla (Henchir-El-Alia)
- Aeliae (Henchir-Mraba? Henchir-Merelma)
- Africa (Mahdia)
- Afufenia
- Aggar
- Aggersel (Abd-Er-Rahman-El-Garis? Tacrouna?)
- Ammaedara (Haïdra)
- Amudarsa (in the plain of Saïda)
- Ancusa
- Aquae Albae in Byzacena (in Gabès Governorate)
- Aquae in Byzacena (in Gabès Governorate)
- Aquae Regiae (Henchir-Baboucha?)
- Aurusuliana (in the territory of Henchir-Guennara)
- Ausafa
- Autenti
- Auzegera
- Bahanna (Henchir-Nebahna, ruins at Dhorbania?)
- Bararus (Henchir-Ronga, Rougga)
- Bassiana
- Bavagaliana
- Bennefa (Oglet-Khefifa)
- Bladia (Henchir-Baldia?)
- Buleliana
- Cabarasussi (Drâa-Bellouan)
- Carcabia
- Cariana
- Cebarades
- Cenculiana
- Cercina (Kerkennah Islands)
- Cibaliana
- Cillium alias Colonia Cillilana (Kasserine)
- Crepedula
- Cufruta
- Chusira (Kessera)
- Decoriana
- Dices (Henchir-Sidi-Salah, Sadic?)
- Dionysiana
- Drua (Henchir-Bou-Driès)
- Dura (Titular See)
- Edistiana
- Egnatia
- Febiana
- Feradi Maius (Henchir-El-Ferada?)
- Feradi Minus
- Filaca
- Fissiana (in the plain of Foussana?)
- Foratiana
- Forontoniana (Henchir-Bir-El-Menadka?)
- Gaguari
- Garriana (Henchir-El-Garra)
- Gemellae in Byzacena (Sidi-Aïch)
- Germaniciana (ruins of Ksour-El-Maïeta? Melloul? ruins of Hadjeh-El-Aïoun?)
- Gratiana
- Gubaliana (ruins of Djebeliana? ruins of Henchir-Goubel?)
- Gummi in Byzacena (Henchir-Gelama?, Henchir-El-Senem)
- Gurza (Kalâa Kebira)
- Hadrumetum (Sousse), the Metropolitan Archbishopric
- Hermiana
- Hierpiniana
- Hirina
- Horrea Coelia (Hergla)
- Iubaltiana (at Kairouan)
- Iunca in Byzacena (Ounga)
- Leptiminus
- Limisa (Henchir-Boudja)
- Macon
- Macriana Maior
- Macriana Minor
- Mactaris
- Madarsuma (Henchir-Bou-Doukhane?)
- Maraguia (ruins of Ksar-Margui?)
- Marazanae (Henchir-Guennara)
- Marazanae Regiae
- Masclianae (ruins of Hadjeb-El-Aioun?)
- Materiana
- Maximiana in Byzacena (near Sousse)
- Mediana (Bishopric)
- Menefessi (Henchir-Djemmiah)
- Mibiarca
- Midica (near Sfax)
- Mididi (Henchir-Medded, Midid)
- Mimiana
- Mozotcori
- Munatiana
- Mutia (Henchir-El-Gheria, Henchir-Furna)
- Muzuca in Byzacena (Henchir-Besra)
- Nara (Bir El Hafey)
- Nationa
- Nepte (Nafta)
- Octaba
- Octabia
- Pederodiana (Oum-Federa, Fodra?)
- Precausa
- Praesidium (Somâa)
- Putia in Byzacena (Bir-Abdallah?)
- Quaestoriana
- Rufiniana
- Ruspae
- Rusticiana
- Sassura (Henchir Es-Zaouadi)
- Scebatiana
- Segermes
- Selendeta
- Septimunicia (ruins of Oglet-El-Metnem? Henchir-El-Bliaa?)
- Severiana
- Sufes
- Sufetula
- Suliana
- Sullectum (Salacia)
- Tabalta (Henchir-Gourghebi?)
- Tagarbala (Bordj-Tamra, Tamera)
- Tagaria
- Tagase
- Talaptula
- Tamalluma (Oasis of Telmin)
- Tamata
- Tamazeni
- Tambeae (in the region of Aïn-Beida and Henchir-Baboucha)
- Tanudaia
- Taparura
- Taraqua (Ksour-El-Khaoua?)
- Tarasa in Byzacena (near Djebel-Trozza?)
- Temuniana (Henchir-Temounia?)
- Tetci
- Thagamuta (in the plain of Guemouda?)
- Thala
- Thapsus
- Thasbalta (in the valley of Segui?)
- Thelepte
- Thenae (Thyna)
- Theuzi
- Thiges (Bordj-Gourbata)
- Thucca Terenbenthina (Henchir Dougga)
- Thysdrus
- Tigias (Henchir-Taus, in the oasis of Kriz)
- Tiguala
- Trofimiana
- Tubulbaca (Teboulba?)
- Turrisblanda
- Turres in Byzacena (ruins of Tamarza? ruins of Msilica?)
- Turris Tamalleni (ruins of Oum-Es-Samâa)
- Tusuros
- Unizibira (Henchir-Zembra?)
- Usula
- Uzita
- Valentiniana
- Vartana (Srâa-Ouartane)
- Vassinassa
- Vegesela in Byzacena (Henchir-Recba)
- Vibiana
- Vicus Aterii (Bir el Ater)
- Victoriana
- Vicus Augusti (ruins of Sidi El Hani, Henchir-Sabra?)
- Vita (ruins of Beni-Derraj?)
- Zella (see) (Zaouila, suburb of Mahdia? ruins of Zellez?)

== See also ==
- List of Catholic dioceses in Tunisia
- List of Catholic dioceses (structured view)
- List of Catholic titular sees

== Sources and external links ==
- GCatholic - Tunisia
- Map of the Roman state according to the Compilation notitia dignitatum
- Place-names in the Compilation notitia dignitatum
