= Borj Gourbata =

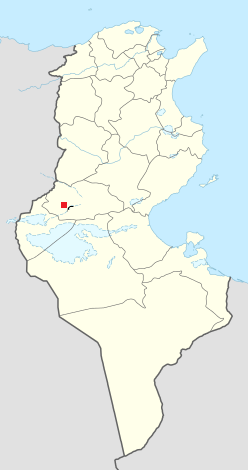
Map of Borj Gourbata in Tunisia.

Borj Gourbata was an ancient Roman-Berber town in Qafşah, Tunisia. It is located at latitude 34°16'22.01", longitude 8°32'56" and 135 meters above sea level. The town is in the Sahel region of Tunisia, but at the junction of the Oued ech Cheria and the Oued el Jemel Wadis, making it an important oasis in the Sahara. It is situated between Gafsa and Chott el Jerid.

== History ==
In Roman times the town was on the Roman Limes in the Roman Province of Africa proconsularis and latter Byzacena. The town was known as Castellum Thigensium or just Thiges. As the name suggest it was a fortification, and was probably the first fort on the limes being built in 75AD.

The town appears on the Tabula Peutinger and was also the seat of a Christian bishopric, which survives today as a titular see of the Roman Catholic church. The current Bishop is Stanislaw Gębicki of Poland.

In the Middle Ages the town was known as Tgiws

The French excavated ruins s in the 19th century

The town was taken in the Muslim conquest of the Maghreb in 647AD, though Roman and Berber populations remains the majority till the 9th century when there were revolts in the area.
