= John Joseph Jenik =

American prelate of the Catholic Church (born 1944)

His Excellency, The Most Reverend John Joseph Jenik
- Auxiliary Bishop Emeritus of New York; Titular Bishop of Druas
- Church: Catholic Church
- Archdiocese: New York
- Appointed: June 14, 2014
- Installed: August 4, 2014
- Retired: October 10, 2019
- Other post: Titular Bishop of Druas

Orders
- Ordination: May 30, 1970 by Terence Cooke
- Consecration: August 4, 2014 by Timothy M. Dolan, Gerald Thomas Walsh, and Dominick John Lagonegro

Personal details
- Born: March 7, 1944 (age 82) Manhattan, New York, US
- Motto: Defend the poor and needy

Styles of John Joseph Jenik
- Reference style: His Excellency; The Most Reverend
- Spoken style: Your Excellency
- Religious style: Bishop

John Joseph Jenik (born March 7, 1944) is an American prelate of the Roman Catholic Church who served as an auxiliary bishop of the Archdiocese of New York from 2014 to 2018. His ministerial privileges were suspended in October 2018, pending Vatican investigation of a sexual abuse allegation.

On October 10, 2019, Pope Francis accepted Jenik's resignation, a normal practice when a bishop reaches his 75th birthday.

== Biography ==
=== Early life ===
John Jenik was born on March 1, 1944, in Manhattan. He was educated at Immaculate Conception School in Manhattan and Cathedral College High School in Queens, New York. He studied for the priesthood at St. Joseph's Seminary in Yonkers, New York.

=== Priesthood ===
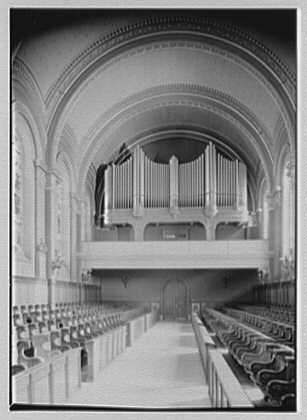
St. Joseph's Seminary, Yonkers, New York (1943)

Jenik was ordained into the priesthood for the Archdiocese of New York by Cardinal Terence Cooke on May 30, 1970. He studied Spanish at the Pontifical Catholic University of Puerto Rico in Ponce, Puerto Rico, and earned a Master of Education degree from Fordham University in New York City. His pastoral assignments were all parishes in the Bronx. They included:

- Parochial vicar at St. Jerome's from 1970 to 1974
- St. Thomas Aquinas from 1974 to 1978
- Our Lady of Refuge from 1978 to 2018

Jenik was named a monsignor by the Vatican in 1995, and served as regional vicar for the Northeast Bronx from 2006.

=== Auxiliary Bishop of New York ===
Jenik was named the titular bishop of Druas and an auxiliary bishop of New York by Pope Francis on June 14, 2014. He was consecrated by Cardinal Timothy Dolan in St. Patrick's Cathedral in Manhattan on August 4, 2014. Auxiliary Bishops Gerald Walsh and Dominick Lagonegro were the co-consecrators. While auxiliary bishop, Jenik continued as pastor at Our Lady of Refuge Parish and the vicar for the Northeast Bronx.

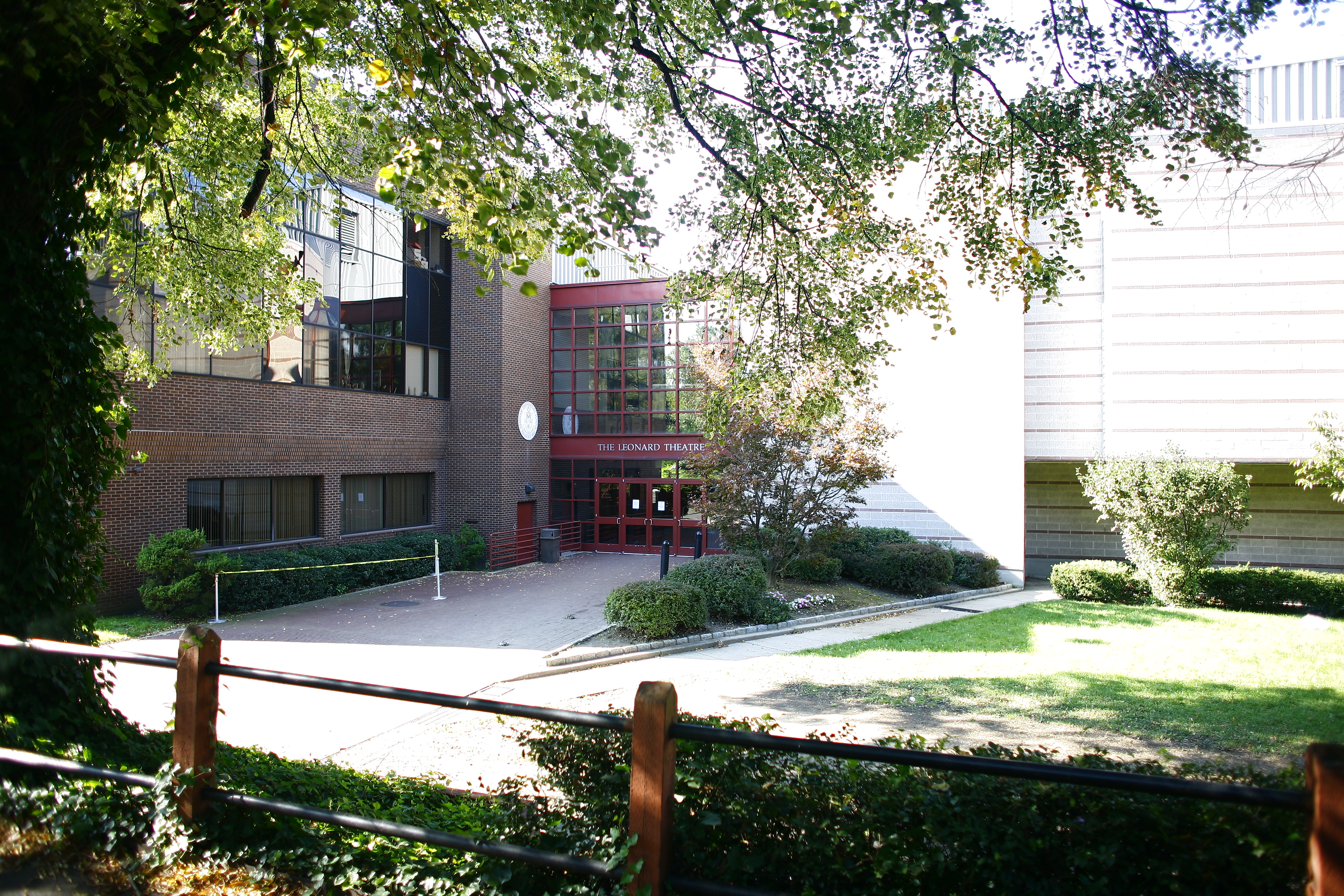
Fordham Preparatory School, Bronx, New York City (2008)

In 2016, a New York man, Michael J. Meenan, filed a sexual abuse accusation against Jenik and Fordham Preparatory School in the Bronx. Meenan claimed that in 1984 Jenik, then a teacher at the school, sexually abused him at age 15 at a sleepover. Fordham found the accusation credible and negotiated a settlement with Meenan. Jenik denied the accusations and remained in his ministerial posts. In January 2018, Meenan filed the same complaint with the archdiocese. He was interviewed by the Lay Review Board later that year, which also decided that the allegation was "credible and substantiated" On October 31, 2018, Dolan announced that Jenik was stepping down as pastor of Our Lady of Refuge and from his other public ministerial functions, awaiting review by the Vatican.

=== Retirement ===
On October 10, 2019, Pope Francis accepted Jenik's resignation as auxiliary bishop of New York, which he submitted as required when he turned 75. His investigation by the Vatican was still ongoing at that time.

== See also ==
- Catholic Church hierarchy
- Catholic Church in the United States
- Historical list of the Catholic bishops of the United States
- List of Catholic bishops of the United States
- Lists of patriarchs, archbishops, and bishops
