= Jeník =

Jeník (feminine: Jeníková) is a Czech surname, which originated a diminutive form of the given name Jan. Notable people with the surname include:

- Jan Jeník (born 2000), Czech ice hockey player
- John Joseph Jenik (born 1944), American Catholic bishop
- Štěpán Jeník (born 1993), Czech ice hockey player

== See also ==
- Jeník, a fictional character in The Bartered Bride
