= Semta (Africa) =

Africa Proconsularis (125 AD)

Semta was a Roman era Municipium also known as Augustum Semta in Africa Proconsularis that is tentatively identified with ruins at Henchir Zemba (Dzemda) Carthage, Tunisia near the Oued el Kebir 20 km (12 mi) southwest of Zaghouan at 36.269282, 9.887345.

== Ruins ==
The site has been excavated and those excavations revealed three different building complexes:

- a 40 m × 50 m (130 ft × 160 ft) rectangular building,
- a 4 m (13 ft) high mausoleum and,
- two further buildings, one of which is called the Byzantine fortress, measuring 40 m × 30 m (131 ft × 98 ft).

Numerous inscriptions have been found there.

== Bishopric ==
The ancient city was also the seat of an ancient bishopric in the ecclesiastical province of Carthage. Only two bishops are known from Semta. The Catholic Maggiorino attended the Council of Carthage (411), as at that time the city had no Donatist bishops. Florenzio took part in the anti-Monothelite Council of Carthage (646). The current bishop is Juan Gómez.
