= Oued Nebhana =

Coordinates: 35°55′N 10°01′E

Oued Nebhana drainage basin.

Nebhana Oued is a stream in central Tunisia at Latitude 35 ° 55'22.27 and Longitude 10 ° 1'29.39 ". Beginning about 59 meters above sea level, it flows into the Mediterranean Sea at the Gulf of Hammamet. During Roman Times the area was intensely farmed and today irrigation from the stream goes to Olive and Apricot production.

== Barrage Nebhana ==
Barrage Nebhana is a dam on the Oued Nebhana, situated between Sarassif Hassine and Ras el Kef, and nearby to Draa Chercheria. Barrage Nebhana is also close to Henchir el Hammam, Henchir Oum Hafsa and Kef er Rekham. in the hinterland behind Tunis

== See also ==
- Henchir Oued Nebhana (Dhorbania, town)
