= Philip Pargeter =

The Right Reverend Philip Pargeter
- Auxiliary Bishop Emeritus of Birmingham
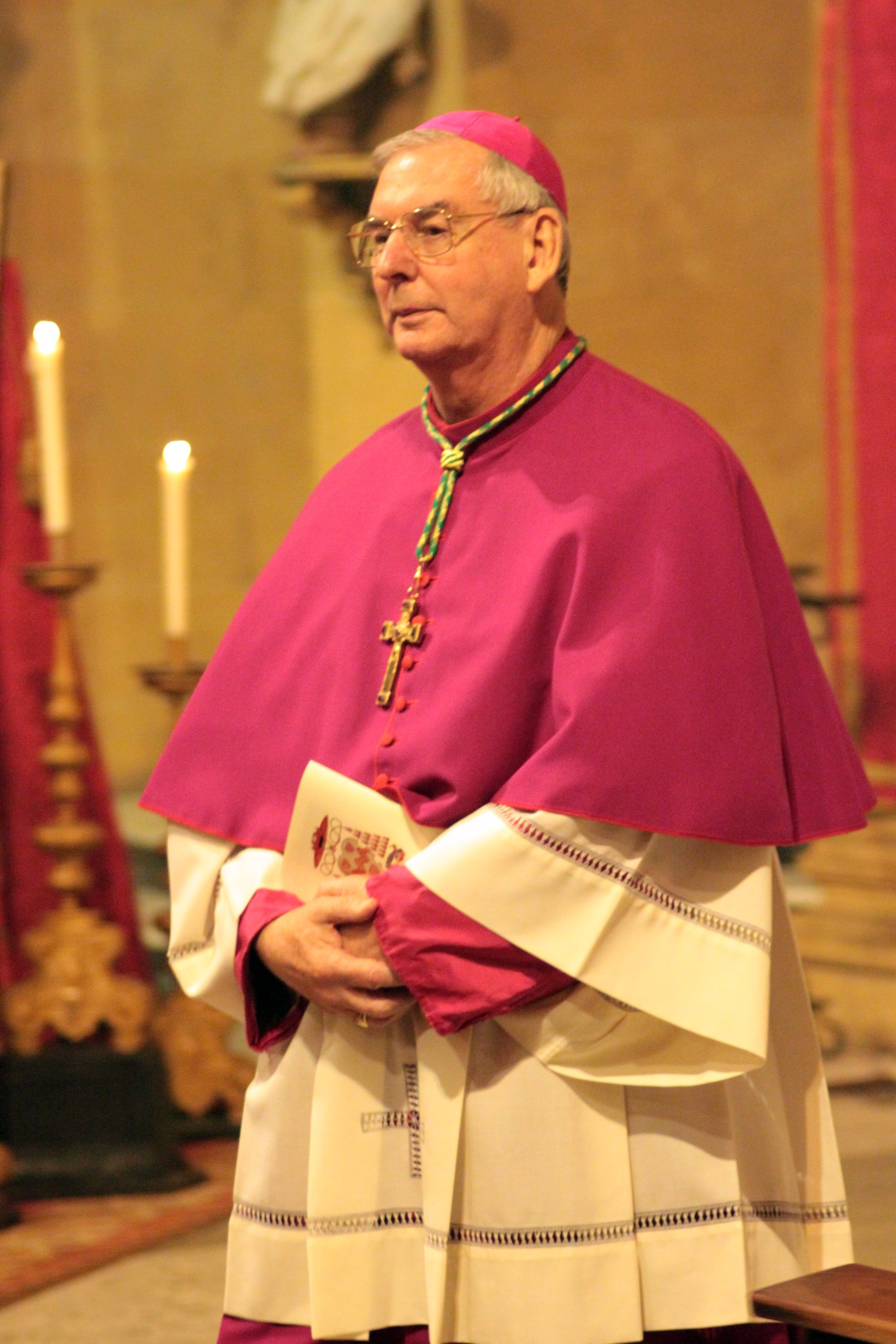
- Bishop Pargeter in 2010
- Church: Roman Catholic Church
- Archdiocese: Archdiocese of Birmingham
- See: Valentiniana (titular)
- In office: 21 February 1990 to 31 July 2009
- Successor: Robert Byrne

Personal details
- Born: 13 June 1933 (age 92) Wolverhampton, England

Styles of Philip Pargeter
- Reference style: The Right Reverend
- Spoken style: My Lord
- Religious style: Monsignor
- Posthumous style: not applicable

Philip Pargeter (born 13 June 1933, in Wolverhampton), West Midlands (United Kingdom), is the Titular Bishop of Valentiniana, and a retired Auxiliary Bishop of the Roman Catholic Archdiocese of Birmingham.

== Early life and ministry ==
He is the son of Philip William Henry and Ellen Pargeter. Philip's family moved to Manchester when he was a child and he attended St Bede's College, a Catholic grammar school in that city. He studied at Oscott College, the Birmingham Diocesan Seminary. Bishop Pargeter was ordained to the sacred priesthood on 21 February 1959. He was on the teaching staff of Cotton College, a Catholic boarding school in Staffordshire for many years (1959–85), teaching geography and religious studies. In 1985, he was appointed Administrator (equivalent to Cathedral Dean) of St Chad's Cathedral, Birmingham, where he served until 1990. He was appointed a Canon of the Cathedral chapter in 1986.

== Episcopal career ==
Pargeter was appointed auxiliary bishop of Birmingham on 20 November 1989, and ordained to the episcopate on 21 February 1990 in St Chad's Cathedral: the principal consecrator was Archbishop Maurice Couve de Murville, assisted by Bishops Gray and Burke.

In accordance with Canon law, he submitted his resignation to the Pope on his 75th birthday, although it was not accepted at that time. A Golden Jubilee Mass of his priestly ordination was celebrated in the Metropolitan Cathedral & Basilica of St Chad on 6 May 2009. Pargeter retired as Auxiliary Bishop in 2009, and his resignation was accepted on 31 July that year.

He has an episcopal coat of arms and his episcopal motto is Servite Domino Cum Laetitia (Serve the Lord with Gladness).

== Personal life ==
He lists his recreations in Who's Who as reading, listening to music and walking. He lives in Sutton Coldfield, Birmingham.
