= Dzemda =

Locality in Tunisia

Africa Proconsularis (125 AD)

Dzemda is a locality in Tunisia.

The site is located near Jougan, Tunisia 20 kilometers south west of Zaghouan. The site is notable for ruins from the Roman era. The ruins are considered to be two separate Roman settlements, situated on opposites sides of a wadi:

- Henchir Ksour Dzemda, a vicus and possible imperial estate
- Sempta (Africa), a Municipum (city).

== Henchir Ksour Dzemda ==
Henchir Ksour Dzemda is a set of ruins located at Dzemda in Tunisia, 20 kilometers south-west of Zaghouan noted for ruins from the Roman era, including a structure of Vaulted construction. Alfred Merlin excavated the site and noted its occupation from 199BC - 799AD. These dates agree roughly with the Conquest of Roman North Africa to the Muslim conquest of the Maghreb. The site is notable for the abundance of its inscription remains.

Although being legally a vicus (village) the settlement has considerable remains. Given its location, it is probable that the village was actually an imperial estate, which were common in the area during this time. The town was also the seat of an ancient Bishopric. This adds weight to the probability it was an imperial estate.

== Semta ==
During Roman times, Annaeus was near the Municipum of Semta (Africa) which lay on the opposite side of the Faida-Dzemda stream. The two sets of ruins have been treated in modern times together though the presence of two different bishops in the two settlements indicates separate entities during the Roman and Byzantine era.
