= Althiburos =

Ancient Berber, Carthaginian, and Roman settlement

Coordinates: 35°52′24″N 8°47′13″E

- 𐤀𐤋𐤕𐤁𐤓𐤔 (Punic) 𐤏𐤋𐤕𐤁𐤓𐤔 (Punic)
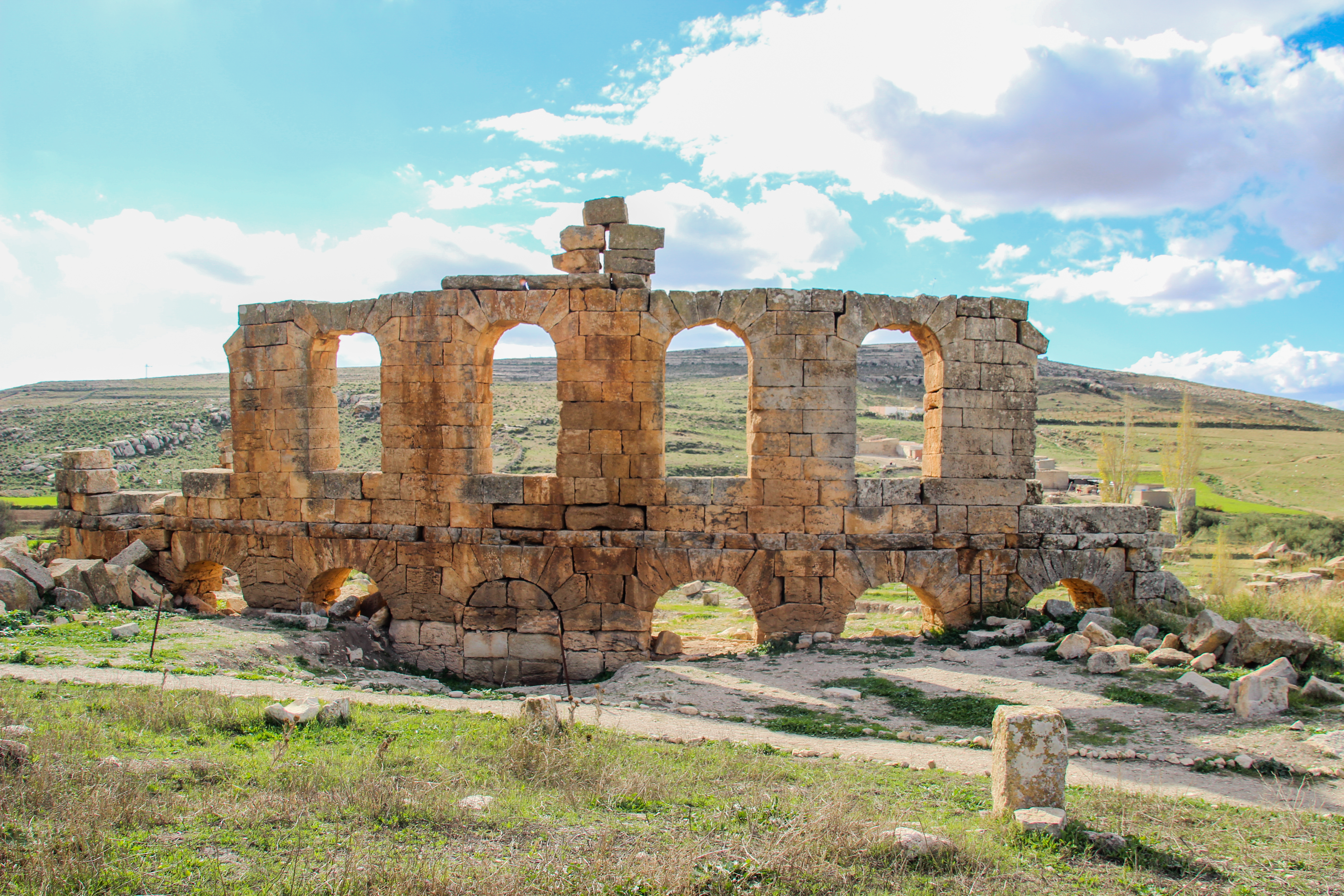
- Ruins at Althiburos

- Location within Tunisia
- Type: Settlement

Althiburos (Punic: 𐤏𐤋𐤕𐤁𐤓𐤔, ʿltbrš or 𐤀𐤋𐤕𐤁𐤓𐤔, ʼltbrš) was an ancient Berber, Carthaginian, and Roman settlement in what is now the Dahmani Delegation of the Kef Governorate of Tunisia. During the reign of emperor Hadrian, it became a municipality with Italian rights. It was the seat of a Christian bishop from the 4th to 7th centuries. The settlement was destroyed during the Muslim invasions and the area's population center moved to Ebba Ksour on the plain. This left Althiburos's ruins largely intact; they were rediscovered by travelers in the 18th century.

== Location ==
The ruins of Althiburos are located near Fej El Tamar on the Ouartane Plateau about 9 km (5.6 mi) southwest of the town of Medeina. In antiquity, it was part of the border of Numidia at the confluence of the Oum-el-Abid and the Medeine Rivers.

== History ==
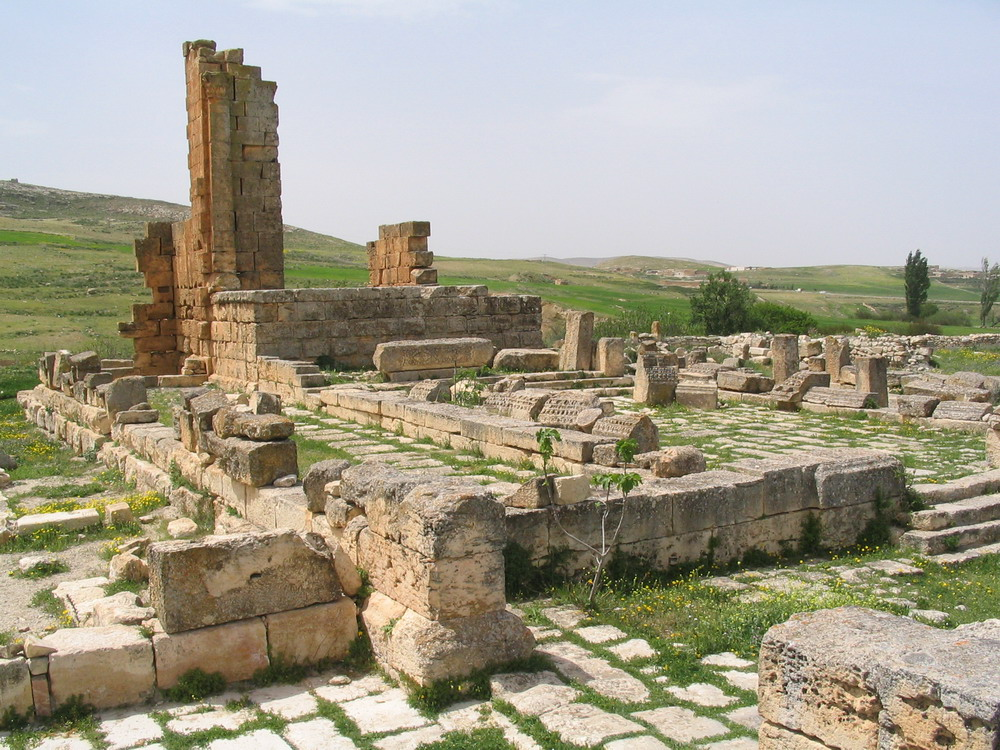
Forum of Althiburos.

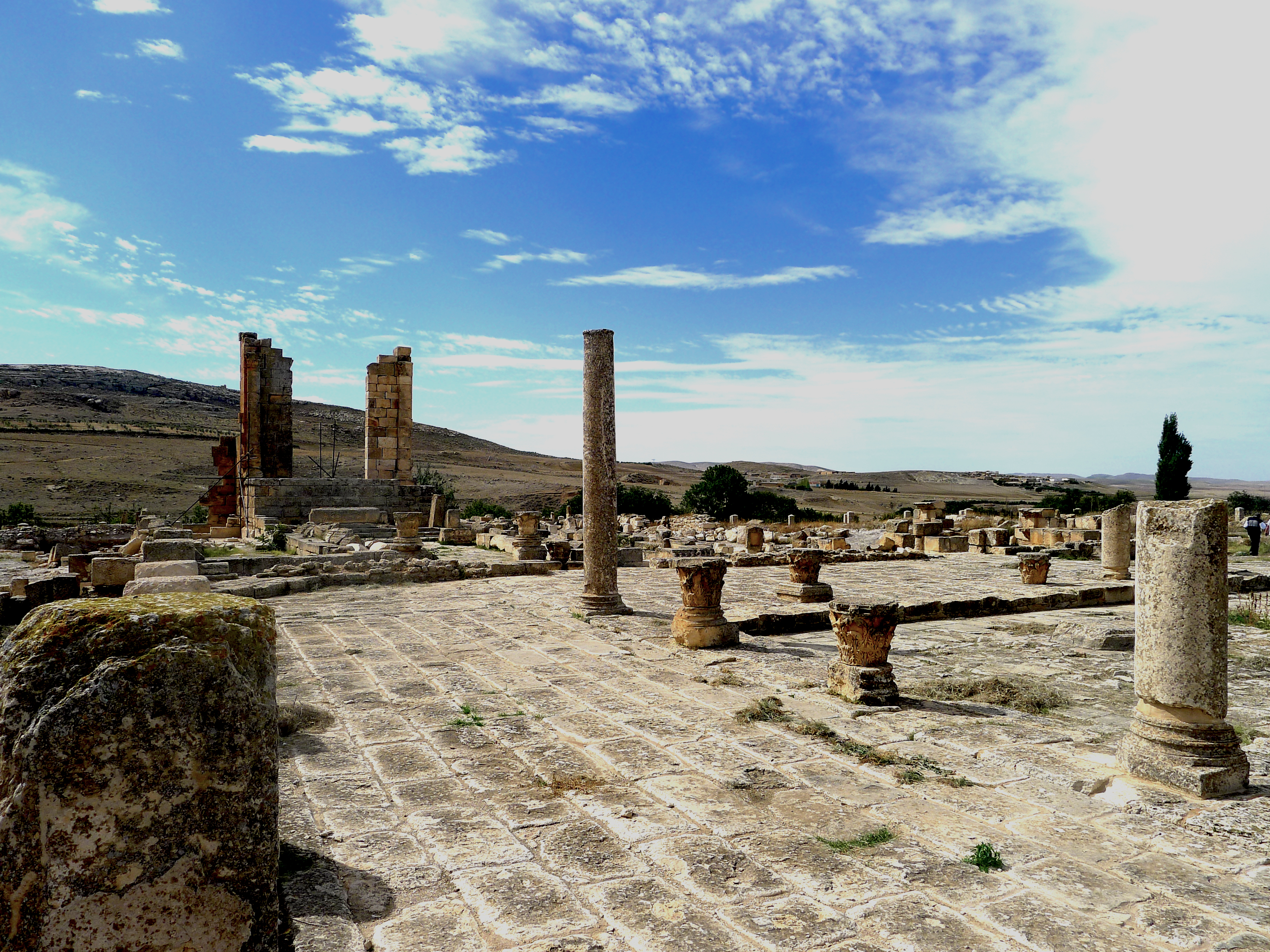
Forum of Althiburos.

Althiburos was an ancient Numidian city at the confluence of two local rivers when it passed into Punic influence and then control. It formed part of the road linking Carthage to Theveste.

After the Punic Wars ended in Roman victory, Althiburos formed part of Africa. It retained a local Punic-style dual magistracy under sufetes well into the early empire, although at one point the city conceived a regional innovation and installed three executives at once. In the 2nd century, under the emperor Hadrian, it was granted municipal status and Italian rights under the name Municipium Aelium Hadrianum Augustum Althiburitanum. from Emperor Hadrian (117–138). It was prosperous in the 2nd and 3rd centuries.

It was the seat of a Christian bishop from the 4th to 7th centuries. The settlement was destroyed during the Muslim invasions and the area's population center moved to Ebba Ksour (Dahmani) on the plain. This left Althiburos's ruins largely intact; they were rediscovered by travelers in the 18th century.

== Archaeology ==
Apart from travel stories that describe it, the site has seen few archaeological excavations. Excavations begun in 1908, interrupted and resumed in 1912, reveal part of the forum, a main street and a monumental door to a bay, with an inscription dedicated to Hadrian. A Punic inscription found at the site is now at the Louvre Museum in Paris.

Under the aegis of the National Heritage Institute of Tunisia, Spanish and Italian teams have been conducting excavation projects since 2006–2007.

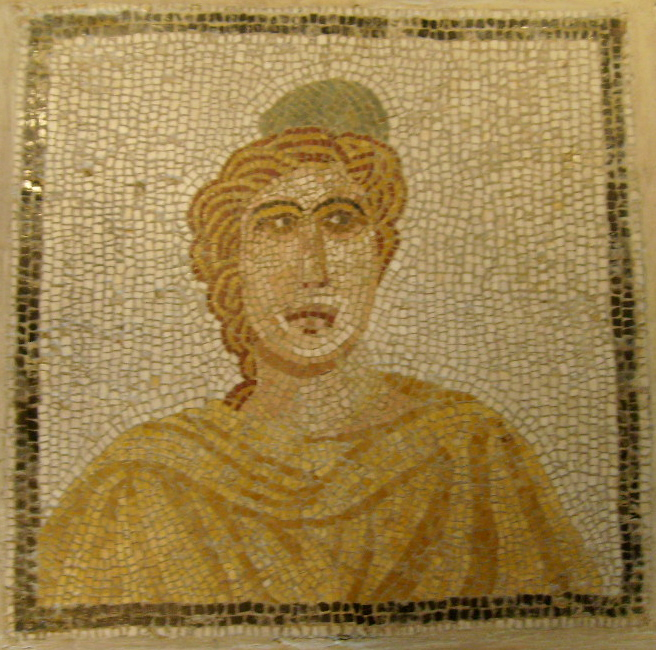
Althiburos mosaic.

The main sites are:

- Capitolium and Forum (44.6 by 37.15 meters (146.3 ft × 121.9 ft)) on a paved esplanade (23.35 by 30.8 meters (76.6 ft × 101.0 ft)) surrounded by a porch with 10 x 12 columns.
- A statue of Minerva and one of Juno in marble were found.
- A triumphal arch is mostly in ruins, but the façade is partly conserved. It was excavated in 1912 and dated between 185 and 191.
- There is a second temple (dedicated to an unknown god or gods) on the opposite side of the Forum, of which only the podium and some Corinthian architectural elements remain; From an inscription, it seems datable to 145. In the northeast corner there is a complex of buildings including a house with a peristyle of 16 columns and geometric mosaics on the four porticos; Other mosaics are in the Bardo Museum. To the southeast of the square, a 10 x 7 meter building that was probably a factory and a monumental fountain
- The house of the Muses, with outstanding mosaics.
- The house of the Peixos scene, on the other side of the river Oued Oum El Abid, with mosaics representing scenes of fish.
- Triumphal arch of the 4th or 5th century
- House of Asclepius, named after a mosaic, had functions that could not be determined, but it is quite original. The mosaics are of great quality
- House of the sixteen bases, by the sixteen figures that appear in six stones of the base that seem to show Punic influence.
- Theater, dam, Mausoleums, the main one of Ksar Ben Hannoun, to the west with a cell of 3.2 by 2.5 meters (10.5 ft × 8.2 ft) and an inscription.
- The Roman Road to Tebessa.

== Theater ==
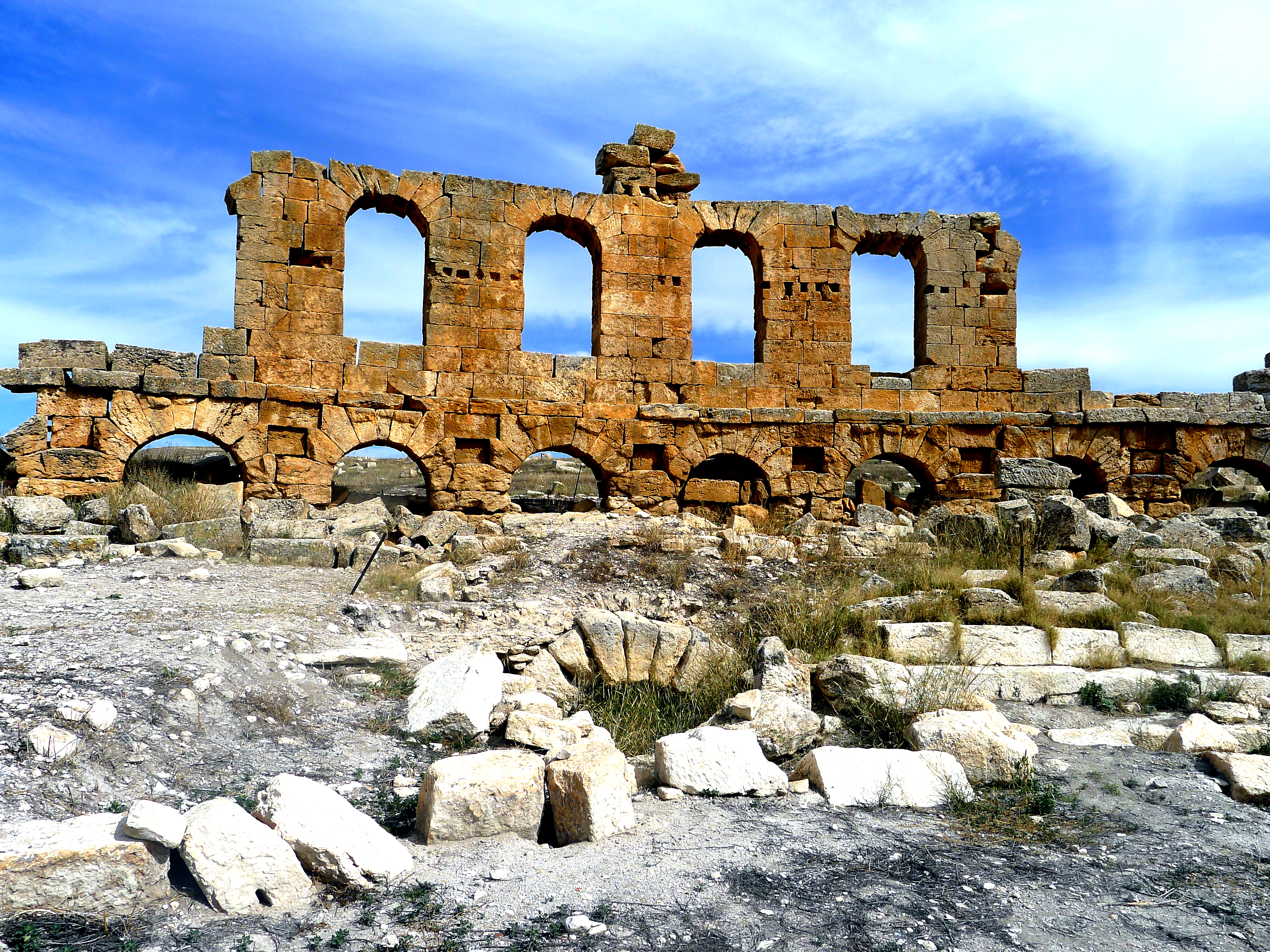
Theatre of Althiburos

The Roman Theatre is located on top of a hill. Remains partially buried remain in the middle of scattered blocks only a series of 19 arcades of which only go beyond the top, surmounted by five arcades of the first floor. René Cagnat and Henri Saladin at the end of the 19th century gave the following dimensions for this theater: 60 meters (200 ft) in diameter and 35 meters (115 ft) in width. The archaeological activities carried out since 2007 have as objective the survey of the ruins and the reconstruction of the theater.

== Early foundation ==
However a remarkable Spanish-Tunisian project has provided a new and radically different perspective on early Numidian society and urbanisation.

Deep trenches in two areas have exposed a six metre deep sequence of pre Roman buildings and occupation levels that have been well dated using radiocarbon. Three broad phases of first millennium BC occupation have been identified, Early Numidian being tenth to eight centuries BC, Middle Numidian being 7th to 5th century BC, and Late Numidian being 4th to 7th century BC.

There is evidence for agriculture right from the beginning with the cultivation of a range of cereals, legumes and viticulture with the addition of the olive by the late 8th century. There is also firm evidence for ironworking by the 8th century, contradicting the presumed primacy of Phoenician technology. It is clear from the crop package that cultivation was already well established many centuries ahead of the wider dissemination of Phoenician sites in Africa.

== Bishopric ==
The Roman city was also the seat of an ancient bishopric which existed until the end of the 7th century. The diocese was reestablished in 1933 as a titular episcopal see. Known bishops include:

- Victor fl. 393 (Donatist/Maximentius bishop)
- Basilius fl. 397-418 (Catholic bishop)
- Augustalis (Donatist Bishop and rival at the Council of Carthage to basilius)
- Vindemius (Catholic bishop) fl. 484 at the Council of Huneric
- Gerald Emmett Carter (1 Dec 1961 – Feb 17 1964)
- Karl Borromäus Flügel (7 Sep 1968 – 1 Jun 2004)
- Gerald Thomas Walsh (28 Jun 2004 –)

== See also ==
- Dahmani
