= Sebkhet Cherita =

Lake in Tunisia

Coordinates: 35.345°N 10.316°E

map of Sebkhet Cherita.

The Sebkhet Cherita is a salt lake wetland in the Sousse Governorate of Tunisia, 25 kilometers southwest of the city of Sousse and 25 kilometers southeast of the city of Kairouan. It covers an area of 11600hectares and is 17 by 9 kilometers wide. Fueled by several wadis, such as the Oued Merguellil, Oued Nebhana and Oued Zeroud.

Although the lake is in the Sahel, it supports diverse flora ecosystems and diverse range of water birds. The catchment system area is 360 km^{2} and the system empties into the Mediterranean Sea.
