= Sebkha Sidi El Hani =

Sebkhet de Sidi El Hani
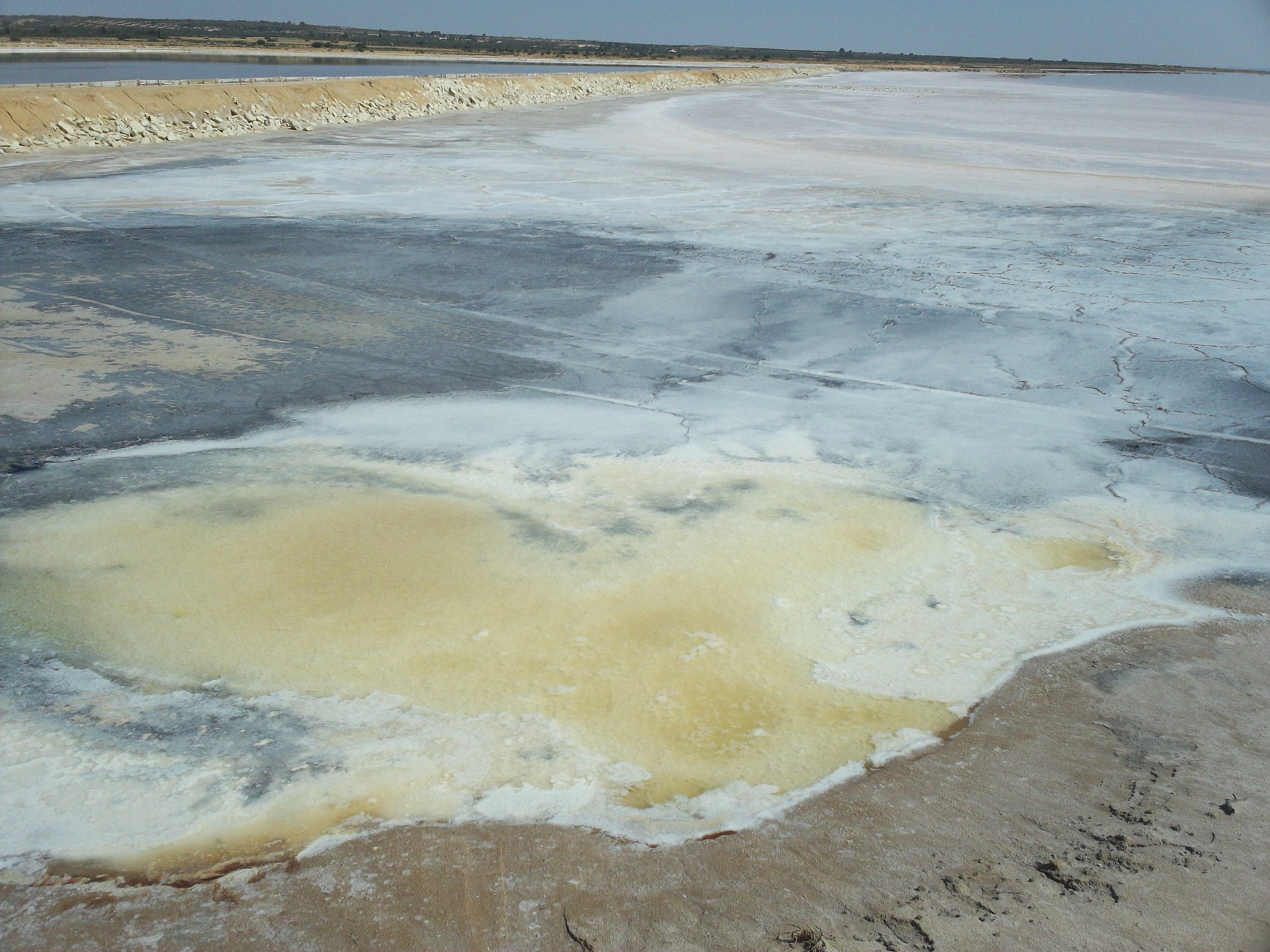
- Sebkhet Sidi Alhani Colours.

- Location within Tunisia
- Location: Sousse Governorate, Tunisia
- Coordinates: 35.55°N 10.41°E
- Type: salt lake

Designations

Ramsar Wetland
- Official name: Sebkhet Sidi Elhani
- Designated: 2 February 2012
- Reference no.: 2019

The Sebkha Sidi El Hani (سبخة سيدي الهاني) is a salt lake in the Sousse Governorate of Tunisia, 25 kilometres (16 mi) southwest of the city of Sousse and 25 kilometres (16 mi) southeast of the city of Kairouan. It covers an area of 36,000 hectares and consists of three depressions: the Sidi El Hani sebkha stricto sensu, the Sebkha Souassi and the Sekha Dkhila. Fueled by several wadis, such as the Wadi Chrita, the Wadi Mansoura and the Wadi Oum El Mellah, it retains water all year round only occasionally. The catchment area is 360 square kilometres (140 sq mi) and the system empties into the Mediterranean Sea.

Map of Sebkhet de Sidi El Hani

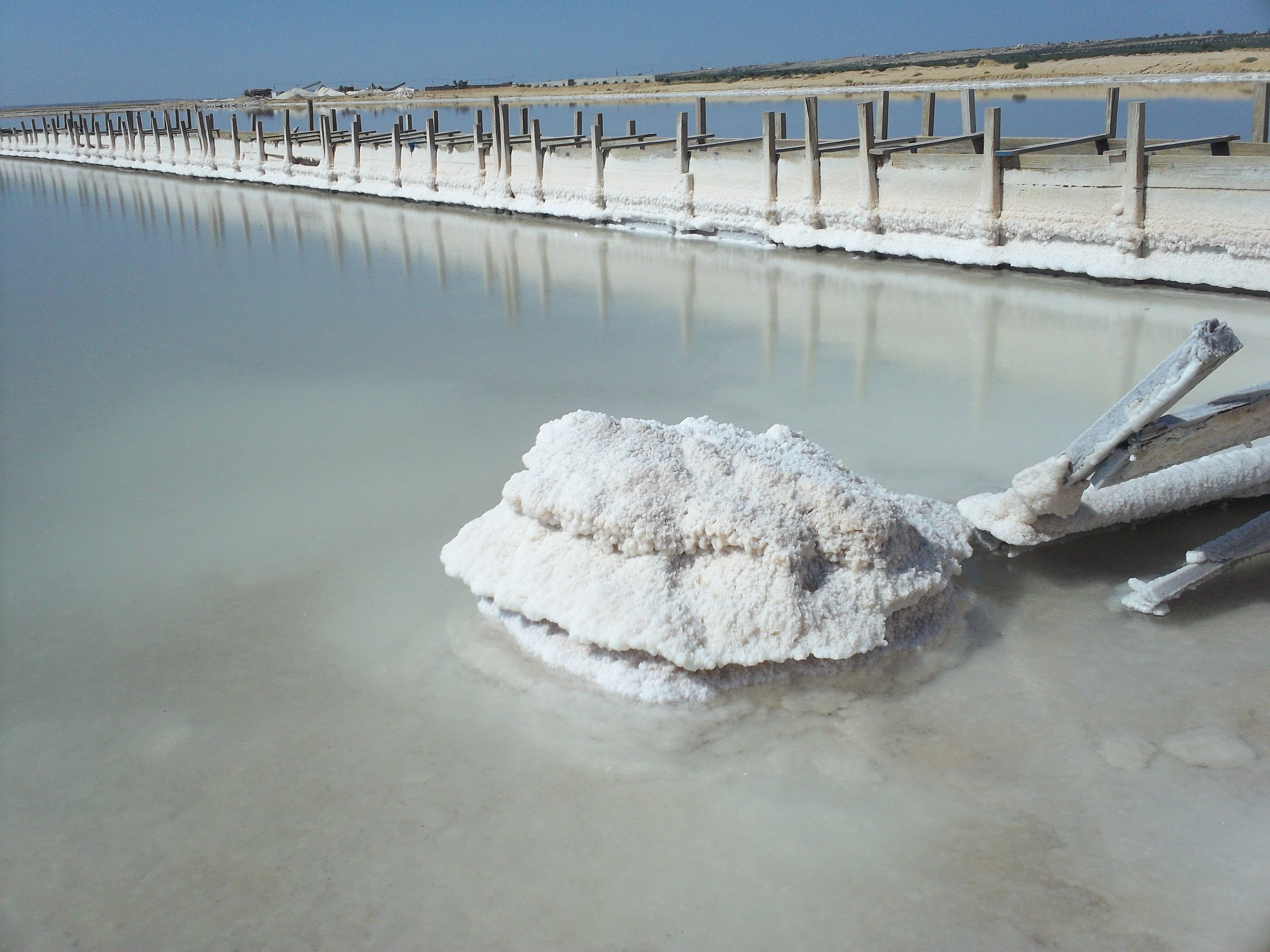
Sebkhet Sidi Alhani Salt pan

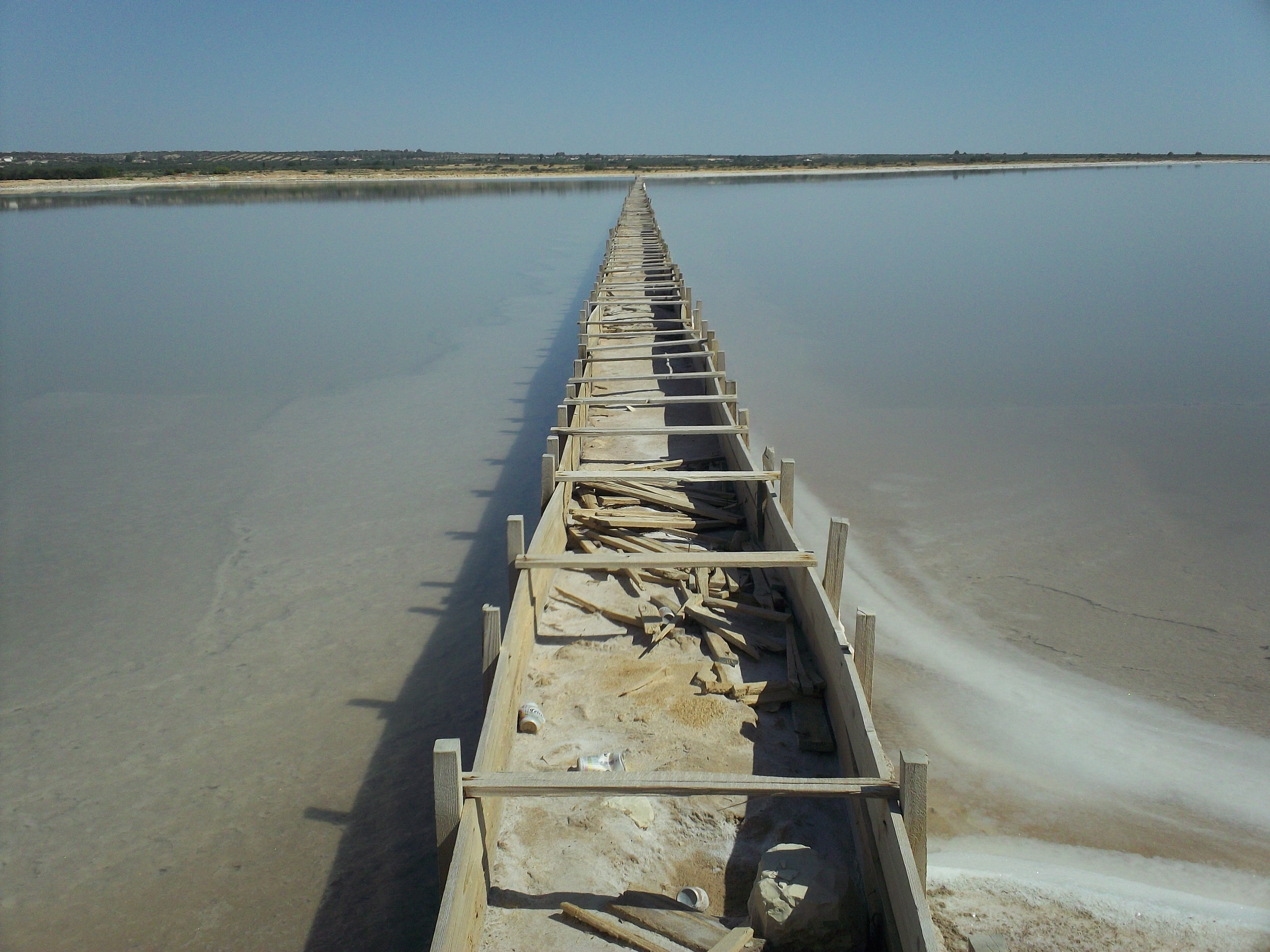
Sebkhet Sidi Alhani Structure
