= Socrates Mesiona =

Filipino Catholic bishop (born 1963)

His Excellency, The Most Reverend Socrates C. Mesiona MSP, D.D.
- Vicar Apostolic of Puerto Princesa
- Church: Roman Catholic Church
- See: Apostolic Vicariate of Puerto Princesa
- Appointed: October 28, 2016
- Installed: February 10, 2017
- Predecessor: Pedro D. Arigo
- Previous post: Superior General of the Mission Society of the Philippines (2004–2009)

Orders
- Ordination: April 14, 1989
- Consecration: February 10, 2017 by Gaudencio Cardinal Rosales

Personal details
- Born: Socrates Calamba Mesiona; September 17, 1963 (age 63) Tagbilaran, Bohol, Philippines
- Denomination: Roman Catholic
- Motto: You will be my witness
- Coat of arms: Socrates C. Mesiona's coat of arms

Ordination history
History
Episcopal consecration
- Principal consecrator: Gaudencio Rosales
- Co-consecrators: Arturo Bastes; Edgardo Juanich

Styles of Socrates Mesiona
- Reference style: His Excellency; The Most Reverend
- Spoken style: Your Excellency
- Religious style: Bishop

Socrates Calamba Mesiona MSP (born September 17, 1963), is a Filipino bishop of the Roman Catholic Church who currently serves as the Apostolic Vicar of Puerto Princesa in Palawan, Philippines. He was appointed by Pope Francis on October 28, 2016, and consecrated as bishop on February 10, 2017.

== Early life and education ==
Mesiona was born in Tagbilaran, Bohol on September 17, 1963. He pursued his philosophical studies at the Immaculate Heart of Mary Seminary from 1980 to 1984 before proceeding to the Divine Word School of Theology in Tagaytay from 1984 to 1989, where he completed his theological formation. In 1994, he went to Rome to study Missiology at the Pontifical Gregorian University, earning a licentiate degree in 1996.

== Priesthood ==
On April 14, 1989, Mesiona was ordained a priest as a member of the Mission Society of the Philippines (M.S.P.). He initially served as the principal of the Fil-Mission Seminary from 1989 to 1991 before being assigned as parish priest of Our Lady of the Abandoned Parish in Mandaluyong City, where he remained until 1994. After completing his studies in Rome, he returned to the Philippines and became the rector of the Fil-Mission Seminary in Tagaytay City from 1996 to 1999.

In 1999, he was appointed as the general treasurer of the Mission Society of the Philippines while also serving as a council member of the congregation. Five years later, in 2004, he was elected Superior General of the M.S.P., a position he held until 2009. Following his term as superior general, he became the National Director of the Pontifical Missionary Works in the Philippines, overseeing the missionary activities of the Church in the country.

== Episcopate ==
On October 28, 2016, Pope Francis appointed Mesiona as the Apostolic Vicar of Puerto Princesa, succeeding Bishop Pedro D. Arigo. Along with his appointment, he was also given the Titular See of Budua. His episcopal ordination took place at the Immaculate Conception Cathedral on February 10, 2017, with Archbishop Emeritus Gaudencio Cardinal Rosales as the principal consecrator and Sorsogon bishop Arturo Bastes, SVD, and Apostolate Vicar of Taytay Bishop Edgardo Juanich as co-consecrators.

In November 2020, Pope Francis reappointed Mesiona as a member of the Congregation for the Evangelization of Peoples, a Vatican office responsible for overseeing missionary efforts worldwide. His appointment to the congregation is set for a five-year term.

== Advocacy and initiatives ==
Bishop Mesiona has been an advocate for social, environmental, and historical causes in Palawan.

He had advocate for preserving Palawan's Christian heritage. In August 2022, he led the launch of a year-long celebration of the 400th anniversary of Christianity in Palawan. The commemoration began at St. Augustine Church in Cuyo town, the oldest parish in the province, and featured a pilgrimage of the Mission Cross throughout the island. In January 2023, he formally requested the Puerto Princesa city government to rename Taft Street to Saint Ezekiel Moreno Street in honor of the first missionary priest in the area. The proposal was meant to reflect the city's religious history, as the street passes by the Immaculate Conception Cathedral and a park dedicated to Princess Eulalia of Spain.

In June 2024, he launched a pastoral program dedicated to the welfare of seafarers and fishers within the Apostolic Vicariate of Puerto Princesa. This initiative aimed to provide spiritual and pastoral care to maritime workers in the region.

On December 1, 2024, he joined the Apostolic Vicar of Taytay Broderick Pabillo and his predecessor Juanich in launching a signature campaign calling for a 25-year moratorium on mining operations in the province to protect its rich biodiversity and natural resources.

Catholic Church titles
Preceded by Pedro Dulay Arigo	Vicar Apostolic of Puerto Princesa; February 10, 2017 – present	Incumbent
Preceded by Jorge García Isaza	— TITULAR — Bishop of Budua; February 10, 2017 – present	Incumbent
