= Broderick Pabillo =

Filipino bishop (born 1955)

The Most Reverend Broderick S. Pabillo S.D.B., D.D.
- Vicar Apostolic of Taytay
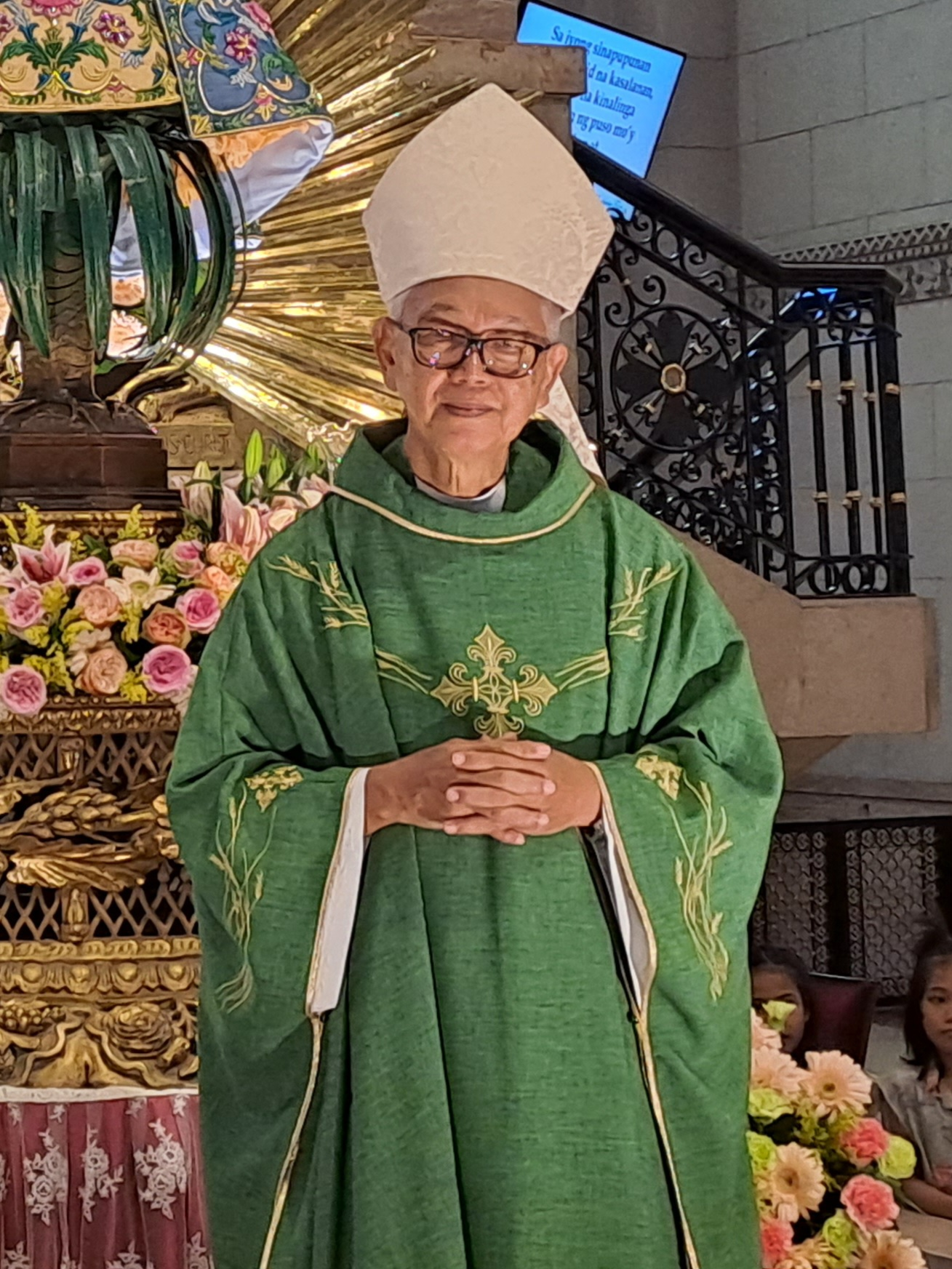
- Bishop Broderick Pabillo in 2023
- Church: Catholic Church
- See: Apostolic Vicariate of Taytay
- Appointed: June 29, 2021
- Installed: August 19, 2021
- Predecessor: Edgardo S. Juanich
- Other posts: Chair, CBCP Commission on the Laity; Ex officio Member, CBCP Committee on Basic Ecclesial Communities
- Previous posts: Apostolic Administrator of Manila (2020–2021); Auxiliary Bishop of Manila (2006–2021)

Orders
- Ordination: December 8, 1982 by Cardinal Jaime Sin
- Consecration: August 19, 2006 by Cardinal Gaudencio Rosales

Personal details
- Born: March 11, 1955 (age 71) Victorias, Negros Occidental, Philippines
- Denomination: Latin Catholic
- Motto: Fides in caritate (Latin for 'Faith through Love')
- Coat of arms: Broderick S. Pabillo's coat of arms

Ordination history
History
Priestly ordination
- Ordained by: Jaime Sin
Episcopal consecration
- Principal consecrator: Gaudencio Rosales
- Co-consecrators: Fernando Filoni; Pedro D. Arigo
- Styles
- Reference style: His Excellency; The Most Reverend
- Spoken style: Your Excellency
- Religious style: Bishop

Broderick Soncuaco Pabillo S.D.B. (Tagalog pronunciation: [pabiljo]; born March 11, 1955) is a Filipino prelate who has been the Vicar Apostolic of Taytay in Palawan since 2021. He previously served as auxiliary bishop of Manila from 2006 to 2021 and apostolic administrator of that archdiocese from February 2020 to June 2021.

== Early life and education ==
Broderick Soncuaco Pabillo was born in Victorias, Negros Occidental, on March 11, 1955, to Conrado Cordova Pabillo and Gloria Acuña Suncuaco. He finished his primary school at St. Joseph School in Naga, Camarines Sur in 1968 and secondary school at Don Bosco Juniorate in San Fernando, Pampanga in 1972.

In 1974, he entered the novitiate of the Salesians of Don Bosco in Canlubang, Calamba, Laguna. He continued his studies with the Salesians, and received his Bachelor of Science in Industrial Education at Don Bosco College, Canlubang in 1977. He taught at Don Bosco Makati from 1977 to 1978, and at Don Bosco Canlubang from 1978 to 1979. Afterwards, he took his theological studies at the University of Santo Tomas, graduating with a Bachelor of Arts in Sacred Theology in 1982.

While studying in UST, he made his perpetual vows on April 1, 1981, and was ordained a priest for the Salesians by Manila Archbishop Jaime Cardinal Sin on December 8, 1982.

== Early ministry ==
After his ordination, he was sent to the Pontifical Biblical Institute to study Sacred Scriptures. He received his Licentiate in 1986 under the Pontifical Gregorian University, and returned to the Philippines.

He served as the parochial vicar of San Ildefonso Parish in Makati from 1986 to 1987, followed by his stint as formator and professor of Old Testament at the Don Bosco Center of Studies in Parañaque from 1987 to 1999. From 1996 to 1999, he served as rector of the Don Bosco Seminary. He also taught at the San Carlos Seminary in Makati, the St. Vincent School of Theology in Tandang Sora, Quezon City; the Immaculate Conception Seminary in Guiguinto, Bulacan; and the St. Joseph Regional Seminary in Jaro, Iloilo.

Longing to serve the poor as a parish priest, in 1999, he left the Salesians and incardinated with the Apostolic Vicariate of Palawan. Until his appointment to the episcopate, he served as the parish priest of St. Ezekiel Moreno Parish Church in Puerto Princesa from 1999 to 2006.

== Episcopate ==
On May 24, 2006, Pope Benedict XVI appointed him as auxiliary bishop of Manila and Titular Bishop of Sitifis. He was consecrated bishop on August 19, 2006, by Manila archbishop Cardinal Gaudencio B. Rosales. The co-consecrators were Apostolic Nuncio to the Philippines Archbishop Fernando Filoni and Pedro D. Arigo, Vicar Apostolic of Palawan.

As auxiliary bishop, he served as vicar general of the Archdiocese of Manila (2006-2021), bishop-in-charge of its Council on Pastoral Affairs (2008-2021), episcopal vicar for Manila Guest Priests (2012-2021), and member of its Board of Consultors (2006-2021), Presbyteral Council (2006-2021), and Archdiocesan Pastoral Council (2011-2021). He also served as chair of the Board of Trustees of the Asian Social Institute (2007-2008, 2011-2013), and trustee of the Pondo ng Pinoy Community Foundation and of the Philippine Bible Society.

He also held various positions at the Catholic Bishops Conference of the Philippines. He led the Episcopal Commission on Social Action, Justice, and Peace (2007-2013), the Permanent Committee on Public Affairs (2013-2015), and the Episcopal Commission on the Laity (2017-2021). Outside of CBCP, he served as chair of the Federation of Asian Bishops' Conference Office of Evangelization from 2017 to 2019.

On February 10, 2020, with the departure of Cardinal Luis Antonio Tagle following his appointment as the prefect of the Congregation for the Evangelization of Peoples, Pabillo was appointed by Pope Francis as the apostolic administrator of the Archdiocese of Manila. He held that until June 24, 2021, when Cardinal Jose Advincula was installed as Tagle's successor.

On July 23, 2020, Pabillo disclosed that he had tested positive for COVID-19, following the release of the result of his RT-PCR test. He was an asymptomatic carrier. He recovered from the disease, as he tested negative in August.

On June 29, 2021, Pope Francis appointed him as Vicar Apostolic of Taytay. He was canonically installed on August 19, 2021, on his 15th episcopal ordination anniversary.

== Political views ==
In January 2024, Pabillo rejected the people's initiative for charter change during the Bongbong Marcos administration, saying that it offers money in exchange for their signatures. He added that the initiative is not by the people, but by some politicians.

Following the arrest of former President Rodrigo Duterte in March 2025, Pabillo said that Duterte's subsequent trial in the International Criminal Court (ICC) is an opportunity for him to determine his accountability for the abuses during his presidency.

Catholic Church titles
Preceded by —	Auxiliary Bishop of Manila; August 19, 2006 – June 29, 2021	Succeeded by —
Preceded by John Choi Young-su	— TITULAR — Titular Bishop of Sitifis; August 19, 2006 – June 29, 2021	Succeeded by Mark Anthony Eckman
Preceded by Edgardo S. Juanich	Vicar Apostolic of Taytay; August 19, 2021 – present	Incumbent
