= San Agustin Center of Studies =

Theological seminary in Quezon City, Philippines

Coordinates: 14°39′45″N 121°02′47″E

San Agustin Center of Studies is a seminary located in Diliman, Quezon City, Philippines. It was founded in 1984.

== History ==
Two years before the birth of the Province of Sto. Niño de Cebu, it was intended to establish a seminary. Upon the completion of the plans, Eduardo Perez wrote to Cardinal Jaime Sin, Archbishop of Manila, seeking approval to erect the seminary, which was granted. The site was chosen. in Diliman, Quezon City, following criteria set by the Council: accessibility and peacefulness. The site is on Fisheries St. in Visayas Avenue, a kilometer away from Quezon City Circle. Rising on slightly elevated two hectare area, it is bounded on the northwest by Culiat River opposite Sanville Subdivision and the University of the Philippines Arboretum.

Following the ground-breaking rites in December 1983, the plan was to complete construction in June 1984, but this was not achieved due to rising prices and conflicts with squatters on the proposed site.

On May 21, 1984, Martin Nolan, Father General, officially approved the erection of the institution and canonically declared it as a religious residence. The concept and architectural design was patterned after colonial types.

In July 1984 the name San Agustin Center of Studies (SACS) came up in a conversation among the original members of the seminary community together with the first Prior Provincial at the San Agustin Monastery in Intramuros. It was adopted as the institution’s name.

On November 13, 1984, the seminary was dedicated following a Eucharistic celebration at its new chapel, with Cardinal Sin as the main celebrant.

The new colonial-type seminary was composed of two edifices. The main structure on the left was three-storey seminary while on the other side was another three-storey building which serves as the residence of the friars. This building boasts of an open terrace protruding from the second floor. Behind them is a separate building housing the refectory, kitchen and chapel. A covered walk joins the latter to the residence.

The seminary is a square-like structure which encloses an inner garden at the center part. It houses 48 individual bedroom, study rooms, chapel and archives, among others. The friars’ residence is equipped with four bedrooms, a living room, library and conference room. Both buildings hold receiving rooms at the ground floor. At the back of the chapel is the laundry room and garage that served as storeroom and stock room during the construction stage.

Additional features were added later including a basketball and tennis court completed in 1985 along with the first layer of the concrete fencing. Two years later, the river crossing bridge connecting Fisheries Street and the Seminary compound was completed. In front was constructed the seminary building.

Many young men were trained in the seminary.

== The community ==
On August 5, 1984, the first students arrived at the still unfinished Seminary. The six novices were joined by formators Arsenio Pioquinto and Rosalio Paderog. Several weeks later, Rogelio Obja-an and Melchor Mirador joined the group. During this initial period there was not even a kitchen or a prayer room for use.

A week after the blessing in November of the same year, the rest of the community including priests and seminarians transferred from San Agustin in Intramuros to the new home led by the Prior Provincial.

The first rector of the seminary's community was Mamerto Alfeche with Paderog as vice rector. Occupying the Fathers’ residence was the first Provincialate community composed by Eusebio Berdon, Prior Provincial; Melchor Mirador, Provincial Secretary, and Rogelio Objaan, Provincial Treasurer.

Others came. By the end of April 1985 the Rector left for Iloilo, leaving temporary management to the Vice Rector.

Before the opening of the school year in 1985, Rodolfo Manaloto and Efren Obja-an, who were on study leave, arrived as working guests.

On July 26, 1988, Paderog was appointed member of the ad hoc committee overseeing the construction of the novitiate house in Cebu; he eventually decided to be freed of his responsibilities as prior as he had too much to do. Manaloto was appointed acting prior until the end of school year 1988–89, and on April 10, 1989, became full prior, continuing to be Master of professed and house treasurer. This left the community with only four members.

To effect the resolution approved during the second Provincial Chapter which called for the transfer of the Provincialate to Cebu, the Provincialate Community was temporarily dissolved. The Prior Provincial and the Provincial Secretary were absorbed by the Basilica Community, and the Provincial Treasurer integrated himself with the seminary community.

For most of the period from 1988 to 1992, formation work in the SACS was handled by a single person.

The community has been involved in: outreach programs in depressed areas of Quezon City and at the home for the aged; participation in social movements meant to help alleviate the plight of the less fortunate, specially the victims of recent calamities such as fire, Mt. Pinatubo eruption, and similar among others; holding of retreat and recollections for the different lay groups; assisting the neighboring parishes of Project 6, San Francisco del Monte and San Lorenzo Ruiz; organizing the youth of the area and holding of daily masses where neighboring residents can attend.

In 1987 St. Monica's Guild with Rudy Manaloto as spiritual director was formed and affiliated with the Order of St. Augustine. St. Monica's Guild was composed of lay women who attended the community prayers and mass every day. The St. Monica's Guild became a part of the community and would join the outreach programs.

In 1998 with Boy Galindez the Cofradia del Sto. Niño de Cebu-SACS Chapter was established. In March 2014 to March 2016, the Pilgrim Snr. Sto. Niño de Cebu from Cebu was brought to 29 Parishes in Metro Manila and Luzon headed by Jun Nohara, John Paul Mabanta, Myrna Garrido, National President of the Cofradia del Sto. Niño de Cebu and the members of the Cofradia.

== Communities of SACS ==
The San Agustin Center of Studies is composed of three communities or institutions, namely, Simply Professed Friars Community (Professorium), College Seminarians Community (Collegium)and St. Thomas of Villanova Institute.

=== Professorium Community ===
Technically, the community is composed of theology students of the Province of Sto. Niño de Cebu. It is a formation community who had taken their temporal vows after the novitiate. It is not a theological school, however, seminarians study in different theological schools in Metro Manila, some have studied in ICLA, Recoletos School of Theology (RST), MaryHill School of Theology (LST), and Loyola School of Theology (LST).

=== Collegium Community ===
Collegium community is the pre-novitiate stage of formation for Augustinians. Most of the students accepted here are graduates from high school and college undergraduates. Formation for Professionals is not housed in SACS bu in Guadalupe Monastery, Guadalupe Viejo, Makati.

The pre-novitiate or postulancy is understood in a general sense as a preparatory time for the novitiate. Its chief purpose is to help the young man who is experiencing the possibility of a vocation, to recognize this possibility and to be able to respond (Cf. RS 11). At the same time, it is the context in which to determine whether a candidate to the novitiate has achieved sufficient maturity. This probationary is designed to reach a tentative judgment concerning the talents and vocation of the candidate, and also to ascertain his knowledge of religious subjects and, where necessary, deepen them to the degree judged necessary; and lastly, to permit a gradual transition from lay life to a life proper to the novitiate. (Cf. RC 11)

=== St. Thomas of Villanova Institute ===
St. Thomas of Villanova Institute is a philosophy school affiliated to the University of San Agustin - Iloilo that is run by the Filipino Augustinian Friars in the Philippines. It has been training seminarians since 1996. Some extern seminarians also study in the institute. It is not an exclusive school for augustinian seminarians but not to lay students.

== Augustinian Houses or Communities in the Philippines ==
1. Basilica Minore del Sto. Niño de Cebu, Cebu City, Cebu
2. Sto. Niño Spirituality Center (Retreat House), Brgy. Tolo-tolo, Consolacion, Cebu
3. Augustinian Novitiate Prayer House, Lower Mojon, Talisay City, Cebu
4. Sto. Niño de Cebu Parish, Lower Mojon, Talisay City, Cebu
5. Provincialate Community, Sto. Niño Pilgrim Center, Cebu City, Cebu
6. Colegio San Agustin - Bacolod
7. Colegio San Agustin - Biñan, Laguna
8. University of San Agustin - Iloilo City, Iloilo
9. Don Salvador Retreat House, (Residence House of Colegio San Agustin - Bacolod Community)
10. San Jose Parish, Iloilo City
11. St. Lawrence the Deacon Parish, Gubat, Sorsogon
12. Monasterio de Guadalupe, Guadalupe Viejo, Makati
13. Sto. Niño de Cebu Parish, Biñan, Laguna (under CSA - Biñan Community)
14. Mother of Good Counsel Parish, San Pedro, Laguna
15. Bayombong, Nueva Ecija (residence house)
16. Mother of Perpetual Help Parish, Socorro Island, Surigao del Norte
17. Sta. Ana Sub-Parish, Burgos, Siargao Island, Surigao del Norte (residence under Socorro Community)
