= Ausuaga =

Ancient city and former bishopric in Roman Africa

Ausuaga is an ancient city and former bishopric in Roman Africa. It is currently a Latin Catholic titular see. Its present location is somewhere in modern Tunisia.

== History ==
Ausuaga was important enough in the Roman province of Africa proconsularis to become one of the many suffragans of its great capital Carthage's Metropolitan Archbishop, but was to fade like most.

== Titular see ==
In 1989 it was nominally restored as a Latin titular bishopric.

It has had the following incumbents, all of the lowest (episcopal) rank :

- Kevin Laurence Rafferty (1990.06.19 – death 1996.04.19), as Auxiliary Bishop of Saint Andrews and Edinburgh (Scotland, UK) (1990.06.19 – 1996.04.19)
- Paul-André Durocher (1997.01.20 – 2002.04.27), as Auxiliary Bishop of Sault Sainte Marie (Canada) (1997.01.20 – 2002.04.27); later Bishop of Alexandria–Cornwall (Canada) (2002.04.27 – 2011.10.12), Metropolitan Archbishop of Gatineau (Canada) (2011.10.12 – ...), vice-president of Canadian Conference of Catholic Bishops (2011.10.18 – 2013.09.25), President of Canadian Conference of Catholic Bishops (2013.09.25 – 2015.09.15)
- Edgardo Sarabia Juanich (2002.05.13 – ...), first Apostolic Vicar of Taytay (on Palawan, Philippines)

== See also ==
- Catholic Church in Tunisia
