= Edgardo Juanich =

Filipino Catholic bishop (born 1952)

The Most Reverend Edgardo S. Juanich D.D.
- Vicar Apostolic Emeritus of Taytay
- Church: Catholic Church
- Diocese: Taytay
- Appointed: May 13, 2002
- Installed: July 12, 2002
- Retired: November 14, 2018
- Predecessor: Office established
- Successor: Broderick Pabillo

Orders
- Ordination: July 11, 1976
- Consecration: July 11, 2002 by Claudio Maria Celli

Personal details
- Born: Edgardo Sarabia Juanich; April 29, 1952 (age 74) Taytay, Palawan, Philippines
- Denomination: Roman Catholic
- Motto: Fiat ('Let it be so')
- Coat of arms

Styles of Edgardo S. Juanich
- Reference style: His Excellency; The Most Reverend
- Spoken style: Your Excellency
- Religious style: Bishop

Edgardo Sarabia Juanich (born April 29, 1952) is a Filipino bishop of the Catholic Church who served as the first Vicar Apostolic of Taytay, Palawan from 2002 until his retirement in 2018.

== Early life and priesthood ==
Juanich was born in Taytay, Palawan, and was ordained a priest on July 11, 1976, for the Apostolic Vicariate of Palawan.

He began his ministry as parish vicar in several towns including Busuanga, Narra, Brooke's Point, and El Nido. After serving in Palawan, he moved to Manila where he assisted at the Parish of St. Pius X while pursuing philosophical studies. During that time, he also served as spiritual director for the “Fate bene fratelli” religious community.

Returning to Palawan, he became a professor and spiritual director at San Jose Seminary in Puerto Princesa City. He was later appointed parish priest of the Immaculate Conception Cathedral in the same city, before taking pastoral charge once more in his hometown of El Nido shortly before his episcopal appointment.

== Episcopal ministry ==
On May 13, 2002, Pope John Paul II erected the Apostolic Vicariate of Taytay in northern Palawan, separating it from the existing Apostolic Vicariate of Palawan (which was renamed Puerto Princesa). Juanich, then a priest of the vicariate, was appointed as its first Vicar Apostolic and titular bishop of Ausuaga.

He was consecrated bishop on July 11, 2002, by Archbishop Claudio Maria Celli. As Vicar Apostolic, Juanich organized the structures of the newly established vicariate and guided its pastoral development, focusing on reaching remote and indigenous communities.

From 2009 to 2011, Bishop Juanich served as the Luzon Southwest Representative to the Permanent Council of the Catholic Bishops' Conference of the Philippines (CBCP).

On November 14, 2018, Pope Francis accepted Juanich's resignation as Vicar Apostolic of Taytay due to health reasons. The vicariate became vacant for three years until Broderick Pabillo, Auxiliary Bishop of the Archdiocese of Manila, was appointed in 2021 as his successor.

Catholic Church titles
Preceded by Inaugural	Vicar Apostolic of Taytay; July 12, 2002 – November 14, 2018	Succeeded by Broderick Pabillo
Preceded by Paul-André Durocher	— TITULAR — Bishop of Ausuaga; July 11, 2002 – present	Incumbent
