= Pedro Arigo =

Filipino Catholic bishop (born 1938)

The Most Reverend Pedro D. Arigo D.D.
- Vicar Apostolic Emeritus of Puerto Princesa
- Church: Roman Catholic Church
- See: Puerto Princesa
- Appointed: February 23, 1996
- Installed: June 4, 1996
- Retired: October 28, 2016
- Predecessor: Francisco San Diego
- Successor: Socrates Mesiona

Orders
- Ordination: December 22, 1963
- Consecration: May 18, 1996 by Jaime Sin

Personal details
- Born: Pedro Dulay Arigo; November 8, 1938 (age 87) Kawit, Cavite, Philippines
- Motto: Suprema Lex Dilectio (Love is the Supreme Law)
- Coat of arms: Pedro D. Arigo's coat of arms

Styles of Pedro D. Arigo
- Reference style: His Excellency; The Most Reverend
- Spoken style: Your Excellency
- Religious style: Bishop

Pedro Dulay Arigo (born November 8, 1938) is a Filipino bishop of the Roman Catholic Church who served as the Vicar Apostolic of Puerto Princesa from 1996 until his retirement in 2016.

== Early life and education ==
Arigo was born on November 8, 1938, in Kawit, Cavite, Philippines. He completed elementary studies at Aguinaldo Elementary School and attended Emilio T. Tirona Memorial High School. From 1951 to 1955, he began his seminary formation at Our Lady of Guadalupe Minor Seminary, later pursuing philosophical and theological studies at San Carlos Seminary in Makati from 1955 to 1964.

== Priesthood ==
Pedro Arigo was ordained a priest for the Diocese of Imus on December 22, 1963, at St. Mary Magdalene Parish in his hometown of Kawit, Cavite. His early pastoral assignments includes being Parochial Vicar at Holy Cross Parish in Tanza from 1964 to 1966, and then at St. Gregory the Great Parish in Indang from 1966 to 1969. He was later appointed Parish Priest of St. Joseph Parish in General Emilio Aguinaldo from 1969 to 1971, then Sto. Rosario Parish in Amaya, Tanza from 1971 to 1972, while concurrently serving as treasurer of St. Gregory Academy in Indang from 1971 to 1986.

In 1972, Arigo became Parish Priest of the Immaculate Conception Parish in Dasmariñas, where he would serve until 1986. During this time, he was appointed Vicar Forane of the Immaculate Conception Vicariate from 1976 to 1980 and later served as Diocesan Treasurer from 1982 to 1986.

From 1986 to 1988, Arigo was assigned overseas as chaplain of the Filipino Catholic Community in Vienna, Austria. The experience broadened his pastoral horizon, particularly in ministering to Filipino migrant workers in Europe. He was appointed Diocesan Administrator of Diocese of Imus from 1992 to 1993.

== Episcopal ministry ==
On March 5, 1996, Pope John Paul II appointed Arigo as the Vicar Apostolic of Puerto Princesa and titular bishop of Mactaris. He was consecrated bishop on May 18, 1996 at St. Mary Magdalene Parish in Kawit, Cavite with Cardinal Jaime Sin serving as principal consecrator with Bishop Deogracias Iñiguez and his predecessor Bishop Francisco San Diego as co-consecrator. His canonical installation took place on June 4, 1996.

He served until his retirement on October 28, 2016, when Pope Francis accepted his resignation and appointed Socrates Mesiona as his successor.

Within the Catholic Bishops' Conference of the Philippines (CBCP), he chaired the Episcopal Commission on Prison Pastoral Care from 2001 to 2011, and continued his advocacy for prison ministry as its vice-chairman from 2011 until 2017.

Catholic Church titles
Preceded by Francisco San Diego	Vicar Apostolic of Puerto Princesa; June 4, 1996 – October 28, 2016	Succeeded by Socrates Mesiona
New title	— TITULAR — Bishop of Mactaris; May 18, 1996 – present	Incumbent
