= Cardinal sin =

Cardinal Sin, cardinal sin, or cardinal syn may refer to:

== Sins ==
- Seven deadly sins, often called the "cardinal sins"
- Mortal sin (Catholicism)
- The three cardinal sins in Judaism, see Self-sacrifice in Jewish law

== People ==
- Jaime Sin (1928–2005), Filipino cardinal and archbishop of Jaro (1972–1974) and Manila (1974–2003)

== Music ==
- Cardinal Sin (band), a Swedish death/black metal band formed in 1995
- "Cardinal Sin", a song by Black Sabbath from their 1994 album Cross Purposes
- "Cardinal Sin", a song by Conception from their 1997 album Flow
- "Cardinal Sin", a song by Powerwolf from their 2013 album Preachers of the Night
- "The Cardinal Sin", a song by Dead Can Dance from their 1985 album Spleen and Ideal

== Other arts and entertainment ==
- Cardinal Syn, a 1998 3D fighting game for the PlayStation
- The Cardinal Sins, a novel by Andrew Greeley
- Cardinal Sin (Banksy), a sculpture by graffiti artist Banksy

== See also ==
- Cardinal sine
