= Saint Gregory the Great Parish Church (Indang) =

Roman Catholic church in Cavite, Philippines

Indang Church
- Saint Gregory the Great Parish Church
- Simbahan ng Parokya ni San Gregorio Magno (Filipino)
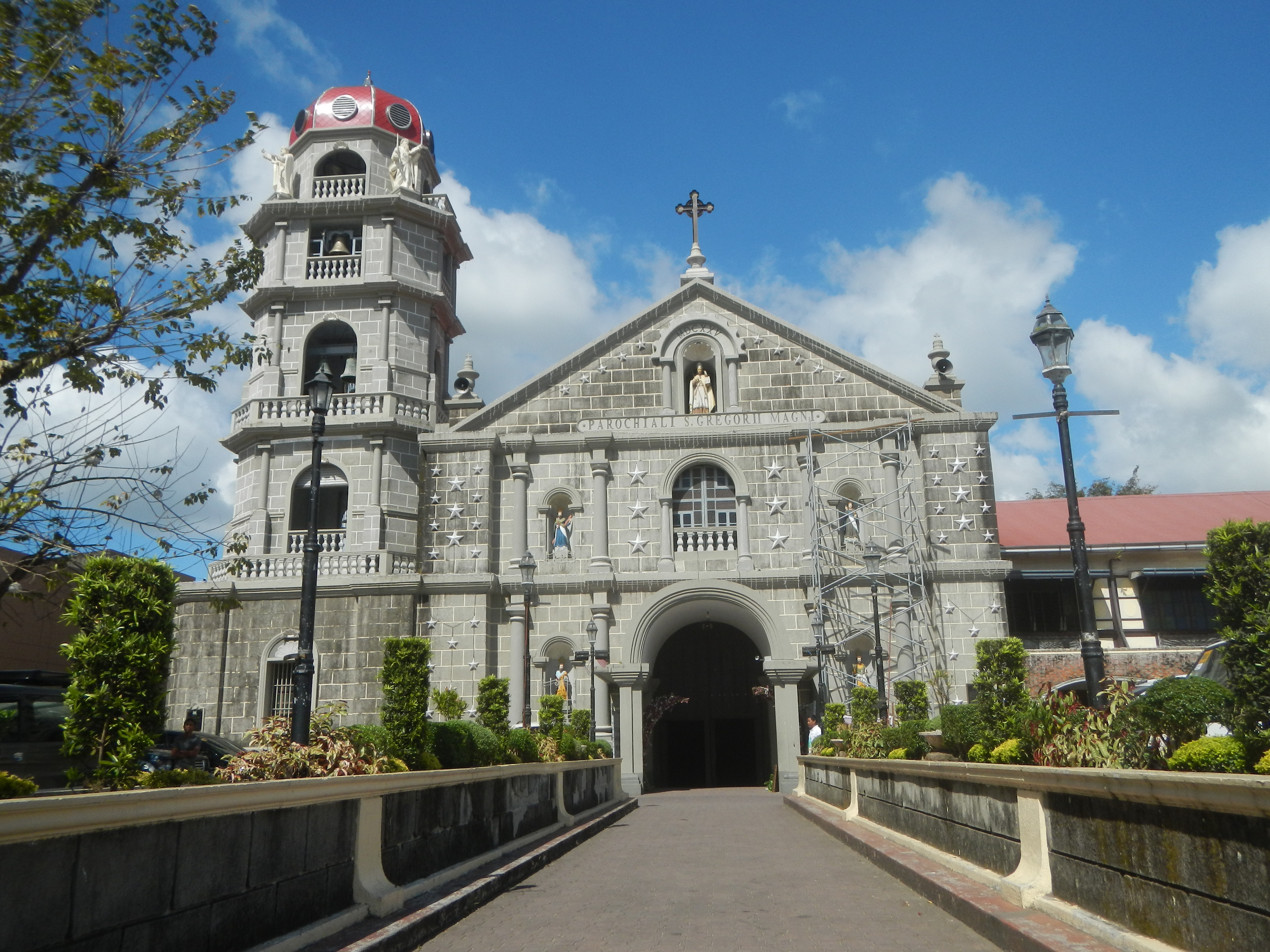
- Church facade in 2018

- Location in Luzon Location in the Philippines
- 14°11′48″N 120°52′42″E
- Location: Poblacion, Indang, Cavite
- Country: Philippines
- Denomination: Roman Catholic

History
- Status: Parish church
- Founded: 1625
- Founder: Angelo Armano
- Dedication: Gregory the Great
- Dedicated: 1625

Architecture
- Functional status: Active
- Architectural type: Church building
- Style: Baroque
- Groundbreaking: 1672
- Completed: 1710

Administration
- Archdiocese: Manila
- Diocese: Imus

Clergy
- Priest: Rev Fr. Marty Dimaranan

Saint Gregory the Great Parish Church, commonly known as Indang Church, is a Roman Catholic church in the municipality of Indang, Cavite, Philippines, under the Diocese of Imus.

== History ==
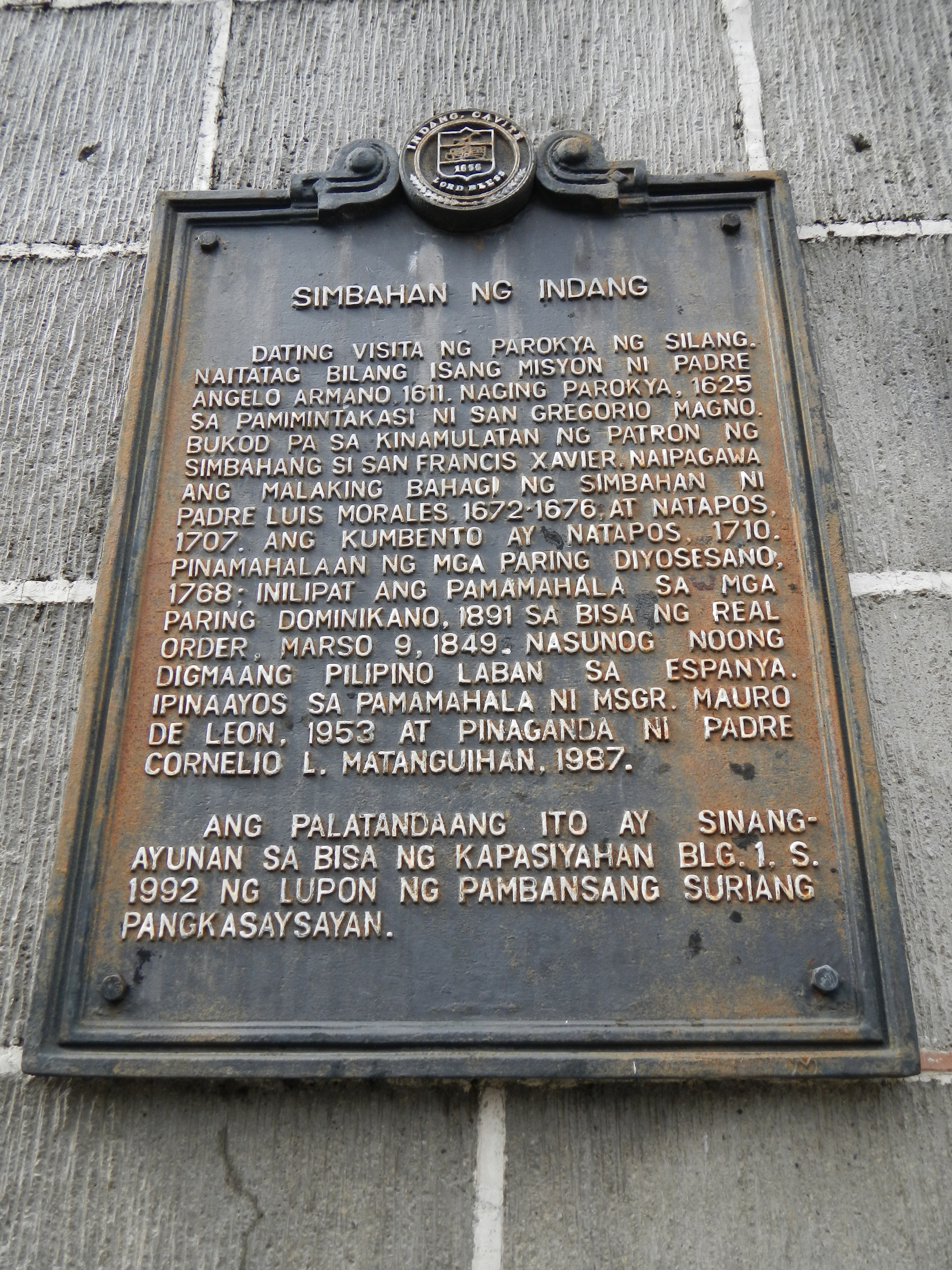
Church local historical marker

Indang, originally Indan, was originally a chapel (or visita) of Silang under the Jesuits. The church's historical marker stated that the church was established as a mission station of Angelo Armano in 1611 and a separate parish in 1625 under the advocacy of Gregory the Great. Even before it became a full-pledged parish, Indang had established devotion to Francis Xavier.

A huge part of the stone church was built during the term of Luis Morales from 1672 to 1676 and was finished on 1710. Diocesan priests served the parish starting in 1768 and it was later transferred to the Dominicans in 1891. In 1786, Domingo Viscarra by the permission of the Archbishop of Manila, Basilio Sancho de Santa Justa, installed the image of Our Lady of Loreto. Jose Diokno, the appointed parish priest of St. Gregory Parish Church from 1819 to 1859, donated the paintings of the 15 mysteries of the Holy Rosary that surrounded the altar of the Holy Rosary on February 10, 1855, as recorded in the inventory of the church properties. At the same time, Diokno not only dedicated the right wing of the church to the altar of the Seven Archangels but also designed its retablo. 1851 was the notable year during which Diokno served when most of the barangays and chapels were established in Indang. The church was burned during the Philippine revolution against the Spaniards. It was restored under the auspices of Mauro de Leon in 1953 and Cornelio Matanguihan in 1987.

== Features ==
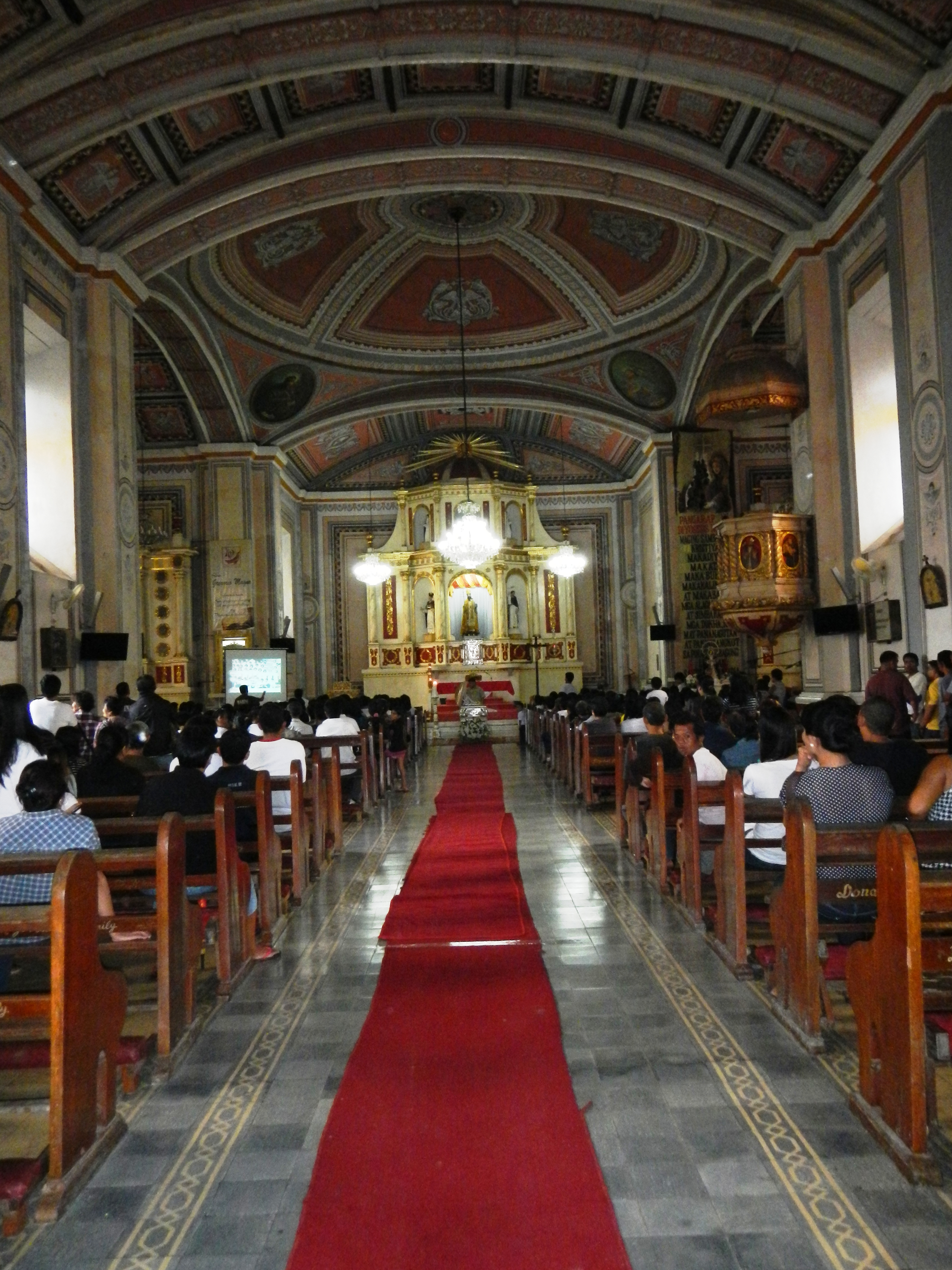
Church interior in 2013

Upon entering the church, elegantly carved doors will be seen first together with the impressive carvings on the choir loft balcony. Built during the 18th century, it has an impressive rose-colored trompe-l'œil paintings on its ceiling. Several commemorative gravestones can also be seen in the walls and pillars of the church. The retablo has three levels of niches for images of saints. Unlike the elegant rose-colored ceiling, restoration works on the retablo involved repainting, with red and gold. At the central niche is the image of the town's patron saint, Gregory the Great. Located at the right side of the altar is a painting of Michael and the Archangels. The pulpit of the church carries the Jesuit monogram surmounted by the image of the Christ child as a sign of being a parish under the Jesuits before the Suppression of the Society of Jesus of 1768.

The church of Indang was one of the first churches in Cavite to use galvanized iron sheets as its roofing in 1869. The adjacent old convent has wide windows and wrought iron work along the sides.

== Devotions ==
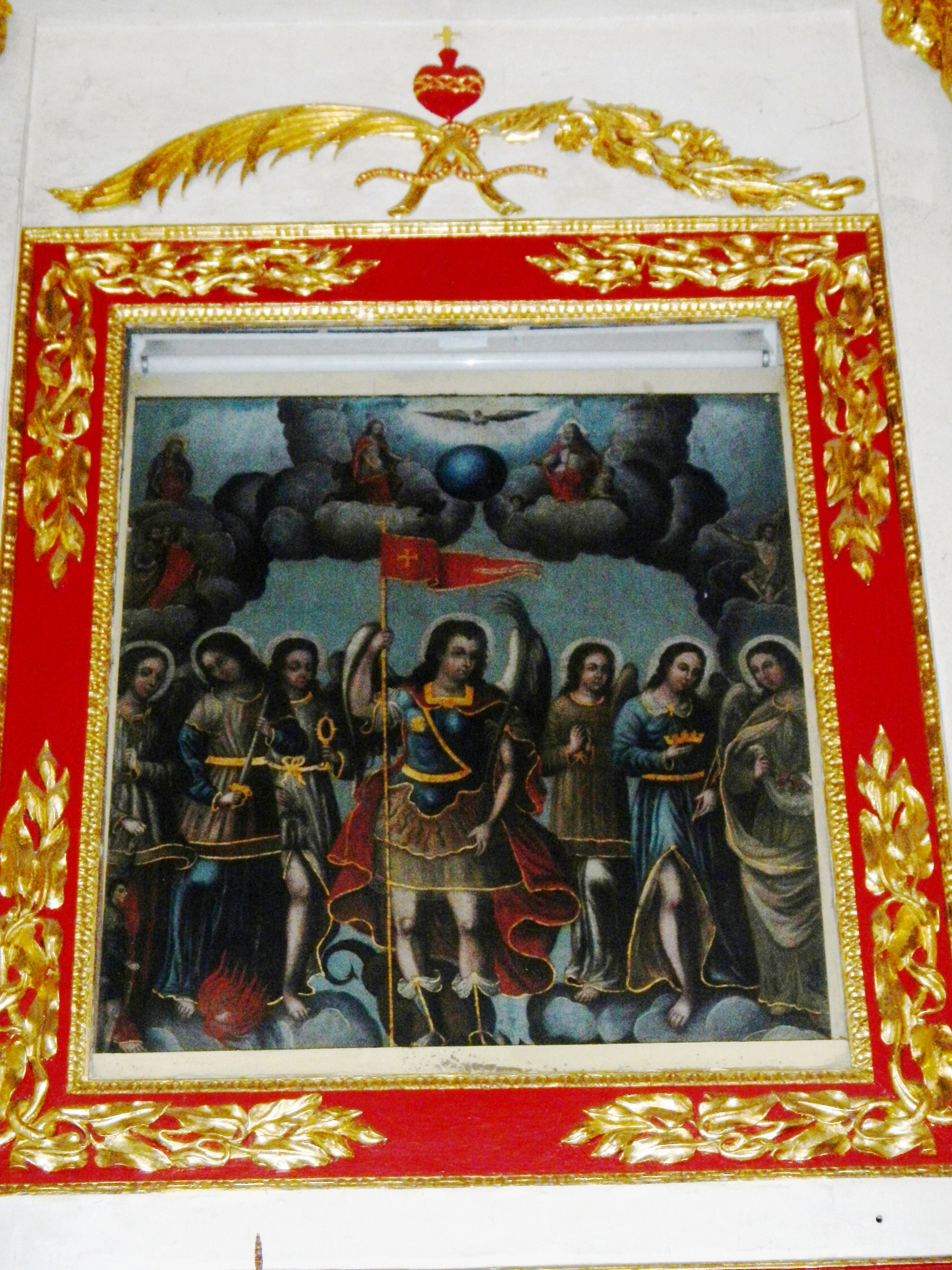
Painting on the Seven Archangels on the right side of the altar

Indang was dedicated under the chaplaincy of Pope Gregory the Great (also San Gregorio Magno). In one incident, the local parish priest found a big, rolled picture at the back of the church together with burnt trash. It was found out to be a painting of the seven archangels. Since then, the devotion to the archangels also grew in the town together with the intercession of Gregory the Great giving the parish of Indang eight patrons. The icon of the archangels is currently found at the right side of the altar. Several miracles are attributed to Saint Gregory and the seven archangels including the peaceful stay of the Japanese soldiers during the war and a failed attempt to raid the town by bandits.
