= Puerto Princesa Cathedral =

Roman Catholic church in Palawan, Philippines

- Immaculate Conception Cathedral Parish
- Parokyang Katedral ng Kalinis-linisang Paglilihi (Filipino); Parroquia Catedral de la Inmaculada Concepción (Spanish); Katedral ng Puerto Princesa (Filipino)
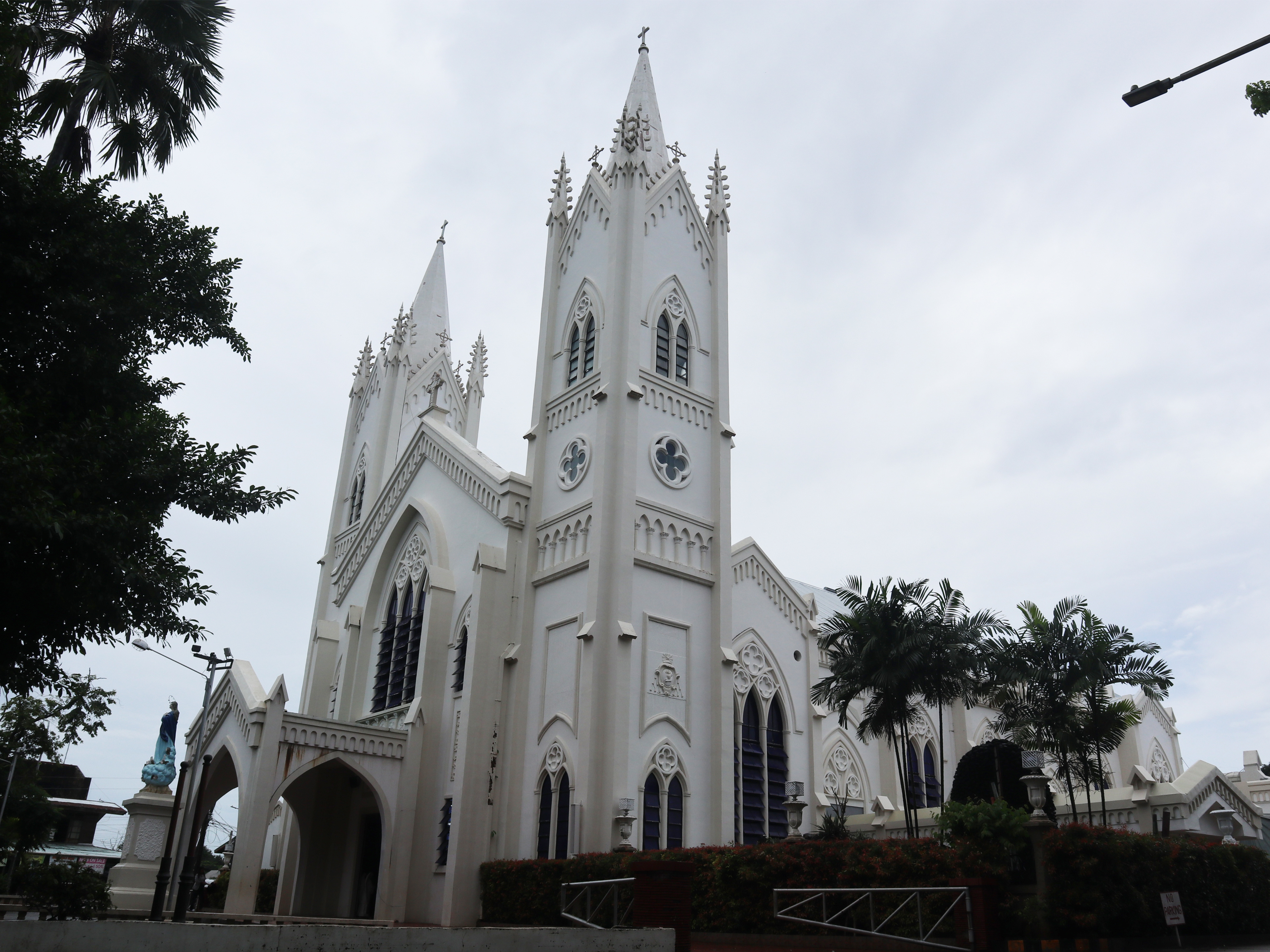
- The cathedral in August 2023

- Location in Palawan Location in the Philippines
- 9°44′26″N 118°43′48″E
- Location: Puerto Princesa, Palawan
- Address: Rizal Avenue/Taft Street, Barangay Maligaya Puerto Princesa, Palawan
- Country: Philippines
- Denomination: Roman Catholic

History
- Status: Cathedral
- Founded: 1872
- Dedication: Immaculate Conception
- Dedicated: 1872, 1961

Architecture
- Functional status: Active
- Architectural type: Church building
- Style: Neo-Gothic
- Completed: 1961

Administration
- Province: Palawan Province
- Diocese: Apostolic Vicariate of Puerto Princesa

Clergy
- Bishop: Socrates Calamba Mesiona

Immaculate Conception Cathedral Parish, commonly known as Puerto Princesa Cathedral, is a Roman Catholic cathedral in the city of Puerto Princesa, Palawan in western Philippines. It is in the Neo-Gothic architectural tradition and is the mother church of the Apostolic Vicariate of Puerto Princesa which covers the municipalities of Palawan west of Puerto Princesa City. It is located at the border of Barangay Matiyaga Poblacion and Liwanag Poblacion, near the Port of Puerto Princesa. At 118° east longitude, it is the westernmost cathedral in the country.

== History ==
The first Mass in Puerto Princesa, initially a barrio, was held at the site of the present cathedral on March 10, 1872, by the Augustinian Recollect Fray Ezequiél Moreno (now a saint), six days after the Spanish expedition arrived in the area. Subsequently, Moreno established the town and its parish mission under the patronage of the Immaculate Conception of the Virgin Mary.

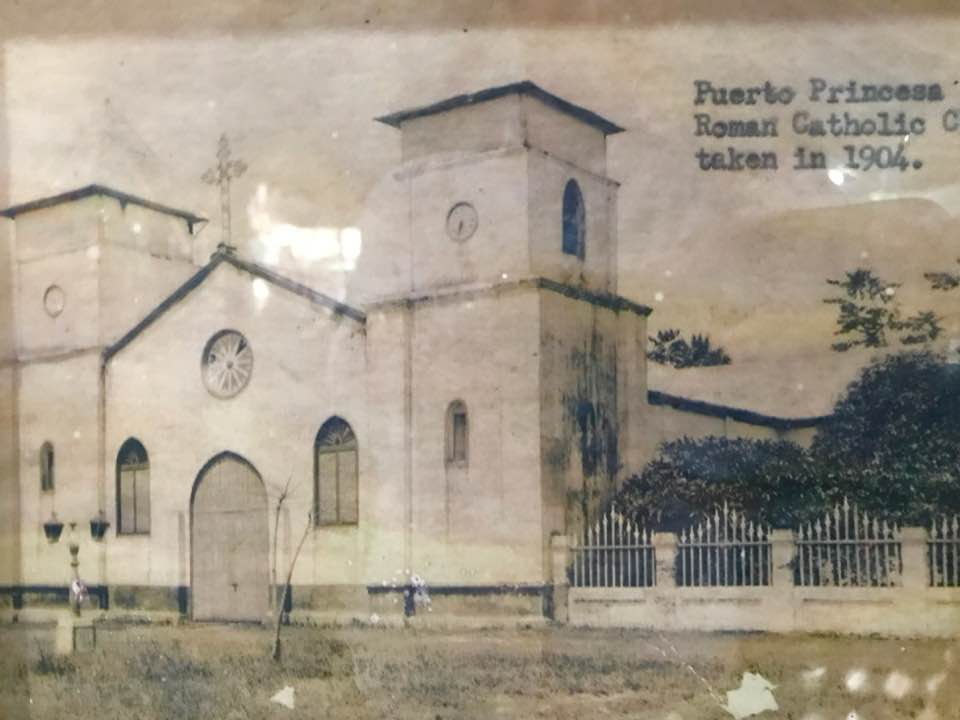
Archival photo of the Church of Puerto Princesa, showing the facade in 1904. This was destroyed during the bombing of the Japanese during the Second World War.

During World War II, on December 14, 1944, the parish witnessed the Palawan massacre at the adjacent Plaza Cuartel where more or less 150 American soldiers were burned by the Imperial Japanese forces.

The church has been rebuilt several times since its establishment, wherein the present structure took almost a century before it was completed in 1961 to serve as a cathedral of the then Palawan Apostolic Vicariate under the helm of Most Rev. Gregorio I. Espiga. The facade and interior are reminiscent of the architecture of churches in Medieval Europe.

On December 8, 2014, on the cathedral's patronal feast day, the National Historical Commission of the Philippines unveiled a historical marker of Saint Ezequiél Moreno, underlining his contribution to the founding of the city. At present, the cathedral and the Rizal Park at its front, is usually included in the itinerary of city tour packages around Puerto Princesa, including, but not limited to Iwahig Prison and Penal Farm, Palawan Heritage Center, Palawan Butterfly Ecological Garden and Tribal Village, and Palawan Wildlife Rescue and Conservation Center (Crocodile Farm).

== Gallery ==
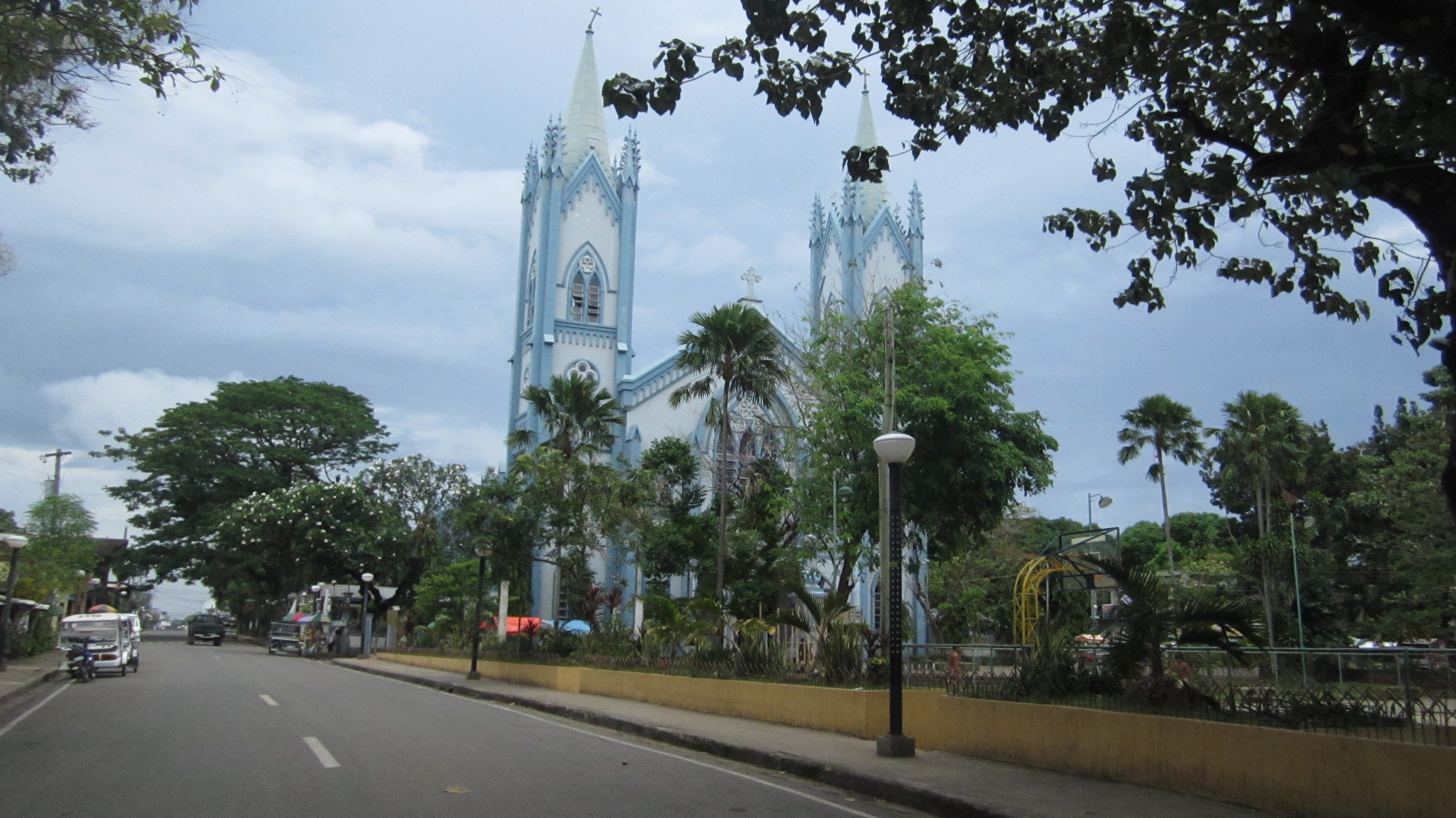
The cathedral and the Rizal Park as seen from a distance

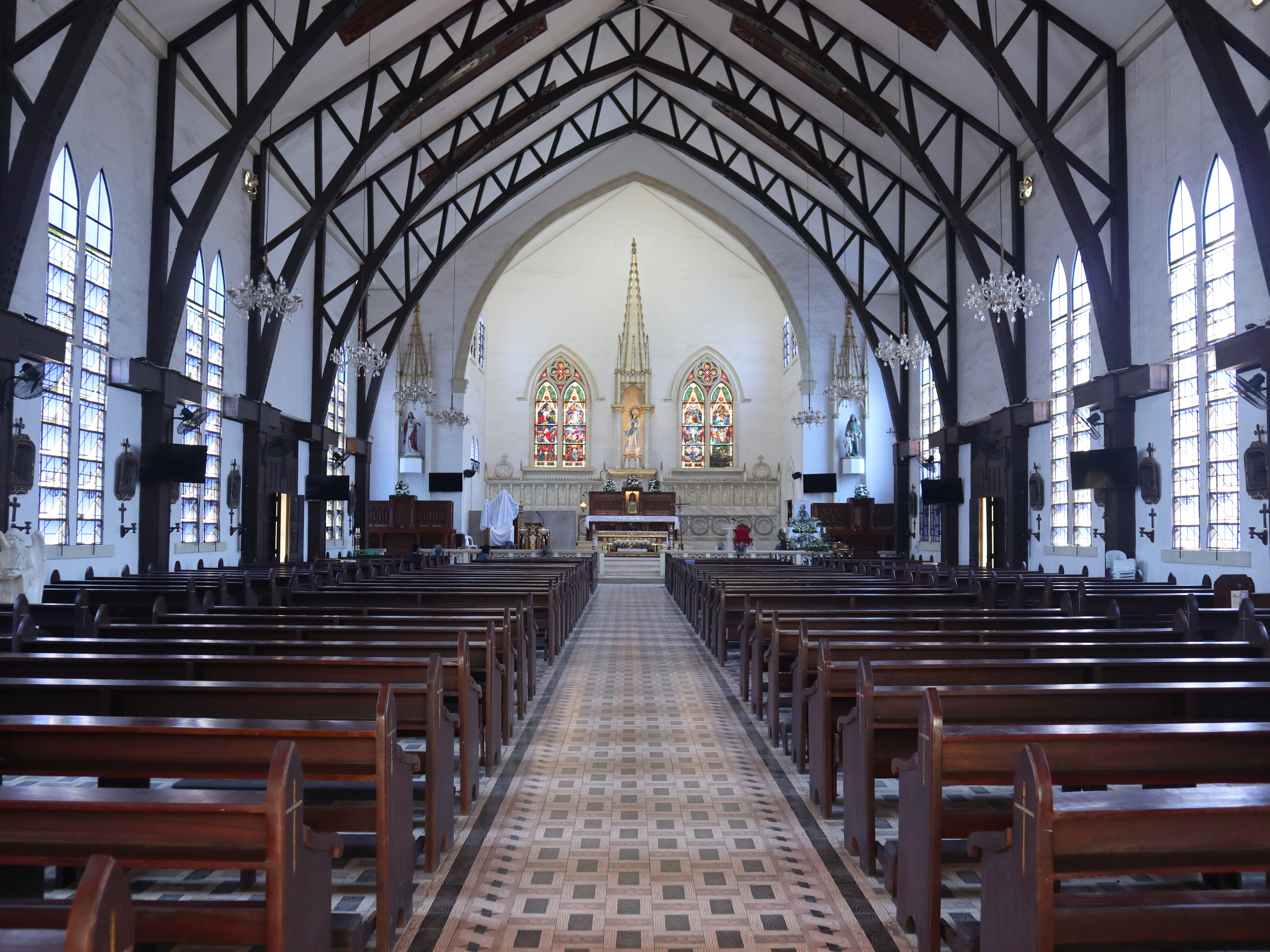
The Neo-Gothic cathedral interior in 2023

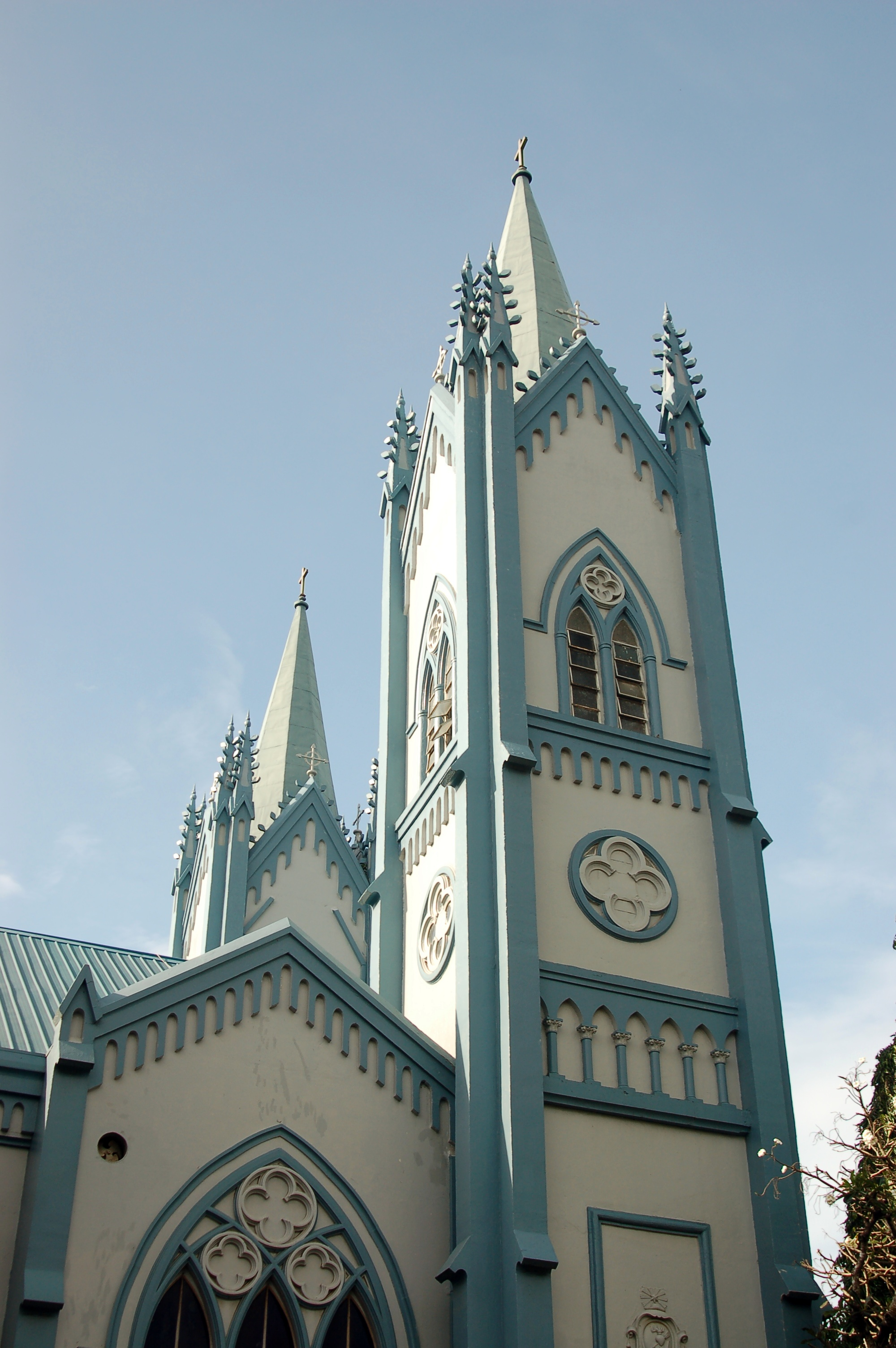
The cathedral's left belfry

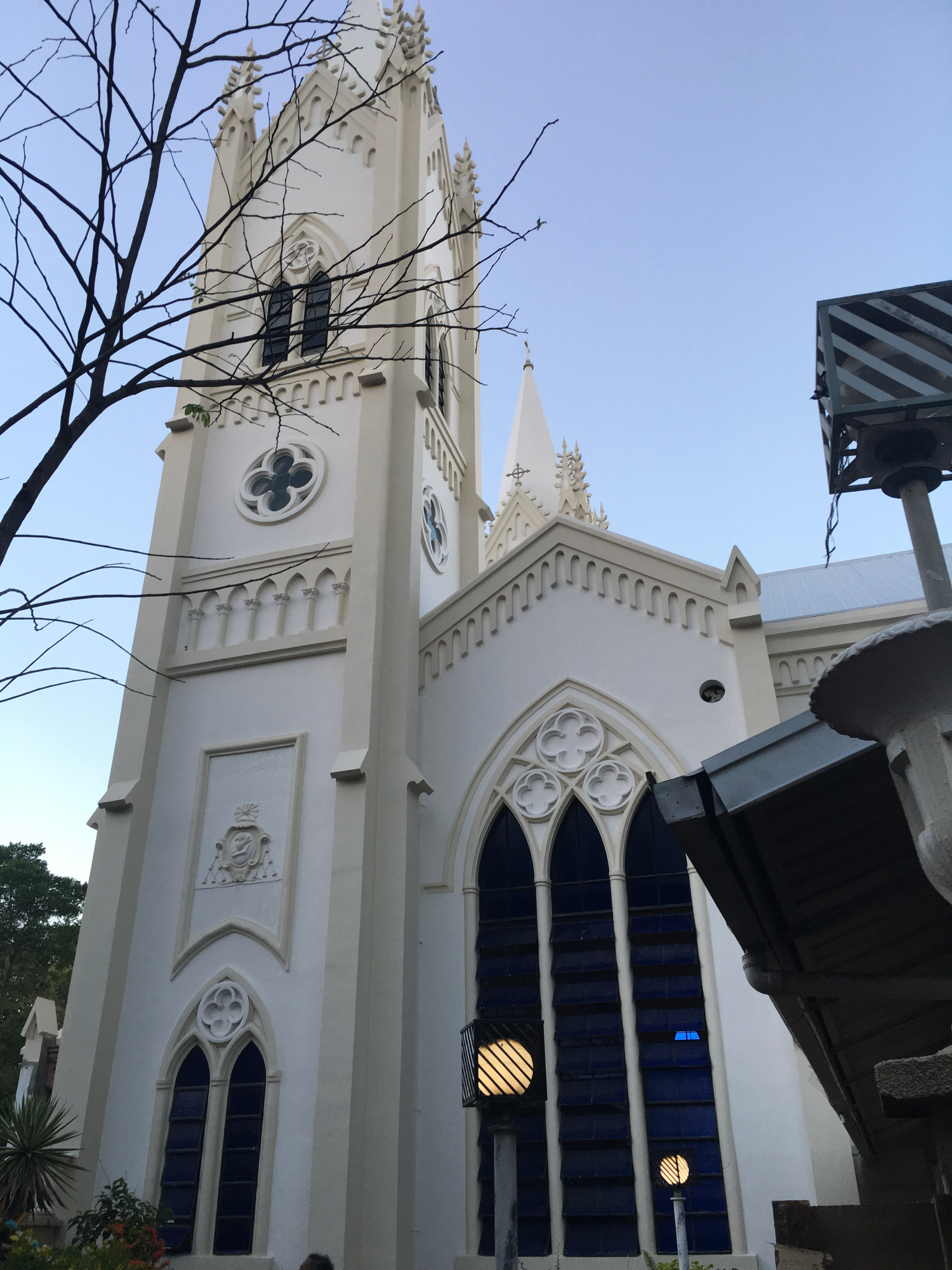
The cathedral's right belfry

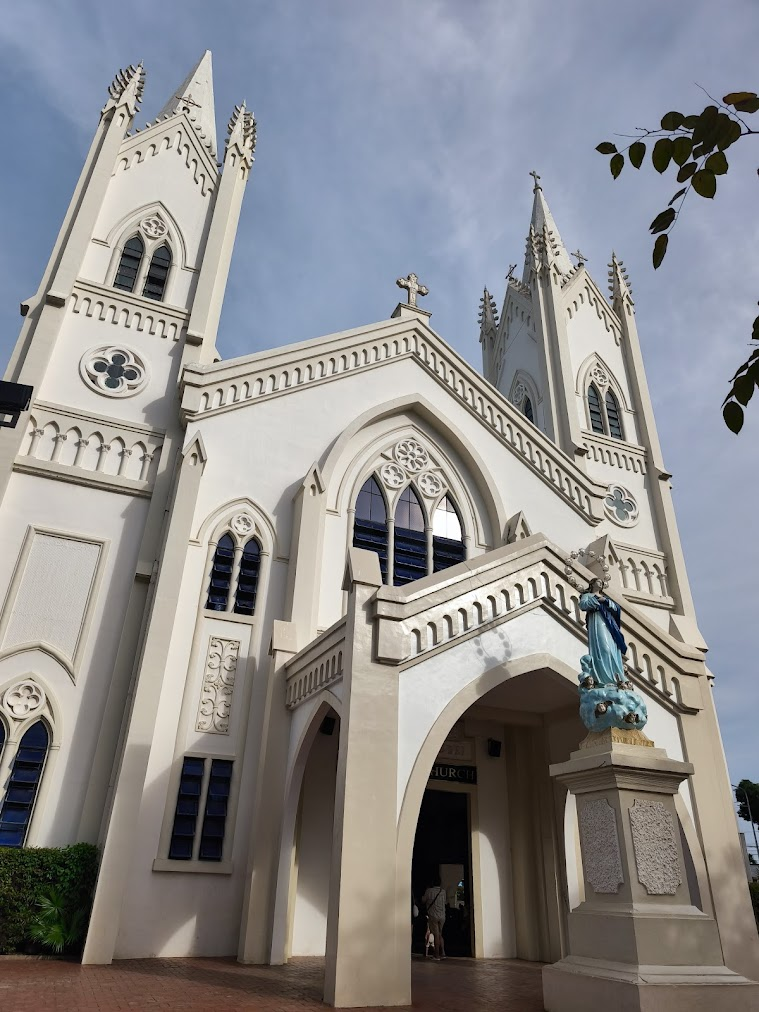
Left side facade
