= Apostolic Vicariate of Taytay =

Latin Catholic missionary jurisdiction in Philippines

Apostolic Vicariate of Taytay Vicariatus Apostolicus Taytayensis Bikaryato Apostoliko ng Taytay Vicariato Apostolico de Taytay

Catholic
- Coat of arms

Location
- Country: Philippines
- Territory: Northern Palawan (Agutaya, Araceli, Busuanga, Coron, Culion, Cuyo, Dumaran, El Nido, Linapacan, Magsaysay, Roxas, San Vicente, Taytay)
- Ecclesiastical province: Immediately subject to the Holy See
- Coordinates: 10°49′12″N 119°30′05″E

Statistics
- Area: 6,413 km^{2} (2,476 sq mi)
- Population: Total; Catholics: (as of 2021); 763,640; 633,821 (83%)
- Parishes: 22

Information
- Denomination: Catholic
- Sui iuris church: Latin Church
- Rite: Roman Rite
- Established: 13 May 2002
- Cathedral: Saint Joseph the Worker Cathedral

Current leadership
- Pope: Leo XIV
- Vicar Apostolic: Broderick Pabillo
- Vicar General: Reynante Aguanta
- Bishops emeritus: Edgardo Sarabia Juanich (2002–2018)

Website
- avtaytay.org.ph

The Apostolic Vicariate of Taytay is a Latin Catholic pre-diocesan missionary jurisdiction in the island of Palawan in the Philippines.

It is not a part of any ecclesiastical province as it is directly subject to the Holy See (under the jurisdiction of the Congregation for the Evangelization of Peoples), yet for the purpose of apostolic cooperation usually grouped with the Ecclesiastical Province of Manila, along with the Apostolic Vicariate of Puerto Princesa.

Its episcopal see is the Cathedral of Saint Joseph the Worker, in Taytay, Palawan.

Nuestra Señora de la Consolacion y Correa de Cuyo of Cuyo, Palawan was granted of Episcopal Coronation on August 27, 2022, making her the first Marian image receive such an honor.

== History ==
It was established on May 13, 2002, as the Apostolic Vicariate of Taytay when it split off from the Apostolic Vicariate of Palawan. The latter then became the Apostolic Vicariate of Puerto Princesa.

== Apostolic Vicars of Taytay ==
Bishop		Period in Office	Coat of Arms
1.	Edgardo Juanich	May 13, 2002 appointed – November 14, 2018 Resigned	
2.	Broderick Pabillo	June 29, 2021 appointed – present	

== See also ==
- Catholic Church in the Philippines
