= Jaime Sin =

Filipino Catholic prelate (1928–2005)

His Eminence Jaime Sin
- Cardinal, Archbishop Emeritus of Manila
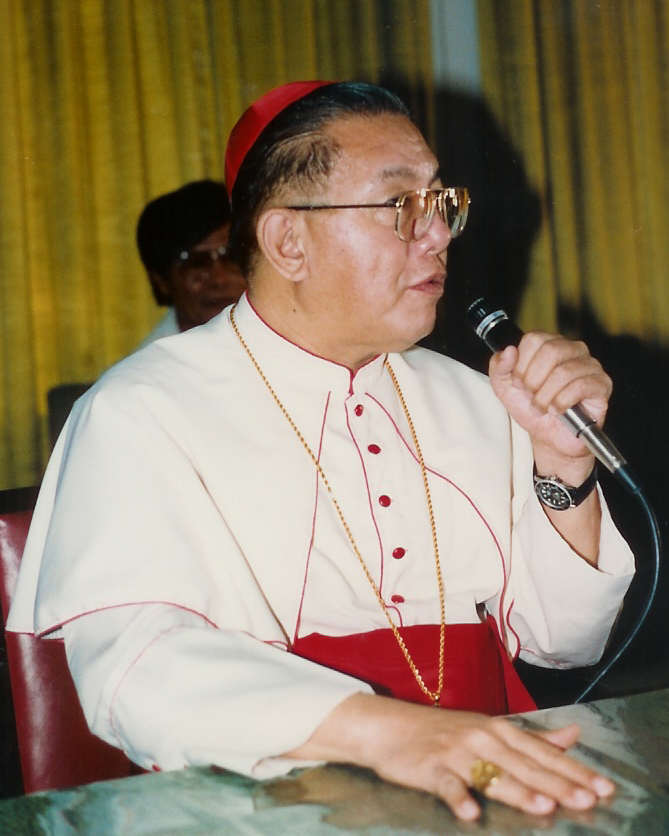
- Sin in 1988
- Province: Manila
- See: Archdiocese of Manila
- Appointed: January 21, 1974
- Installed: March 19, 1974
- Retired: September 15, 2003
- Predecessor: Rufino Santos
- Successor: Gaudencio Rosales
- Other post: Cardinal Priest of Santa Maria ai Monti (1976–2005)
- Previous posts: Titular Bishop of Obba and Auxiliary Bishop of Jaro (1967–1972); Apostolic Administrator of Jaro (1970–1972); Titular Archbishop of Massa Lubrense and Coadjutor Archbishop of Jaro (1972); Archbishop of Jaro (1972–1974); Vice President of the Catholic Bishops' Conference of the Philippines (1974–1977); President of the Catholic Bishops' Conference of the Philippines (1977–1981)

Orders
- Ordination: April 3, 1954 by Antonio Frondosa
- Consecration: March 18, 1967 by Antonio Frondosa
- Created cardinal: May 24, 1976 by Pope Paul VI
- Rank: Cardinal priest

Personal details
- Born: Jaime Lachica Sin; August 31, 1928 New Washington, Aklan, Philippine Islands
- Died: June 21, 2005 (aged 76) San Juan, Philippines
- Buried: Manila Cathedral
- Denomination: Catholic Church
- Parents: Juan Sin (father); Maxima Lachica (mother)
- Education: St. Vincent Ferrer Seminary
- Motto: Serviam (Latin for 'I will serve')
- Signature: Jaime Sin's signature

- Coat of arms: Jaime Sin's coat of arms

Ordination history
History
Priestly ordination
- Ordained by: Antonio Frondosa
- Date: April 3, 1954
- Place: Jaro, Iloilo City
Episcopal consecration
- Principal consecrator: Antonio Frondosa
- Co-consecrators: Juan Nicolasora Nilmar; Manuel S. Salvador
- Date: March 18, 1967
Cardinalate
- Date: May 24, 1976
Episcopal succession
Bishops consecrated by Jaime Sin as principal consecrator
- Antonio Buenafe: March 30, 1976
- Federico O. Escaler, SJ: July 31, 1976
- Generoso C. Camiña, PME: May 24, 1978
- Manuel C. Sobreviñas: May 25, 1979
- Lucilo Quiambao: April 27, 1982
- Warlito Cajandig: June 21, 1989
- Crisostomo Yalung: May 31, 1994
- Rolando Joven Tria Tirona: December 29, 1994
- Pedro D. Arigo: May 18, 1996
- José Paala Salazar: June 7, 1996
- Jesse E. Mercado: March 31, 1997
- Honesto Ongtioco: June 18, 1998
- Socrates B. Villegas: August 31, 2001
- Nereo P. Odchimar: November 27, 2001
- Luis Antonio Tagle: December 12, 2001
- Jose Corazon Tala-oc: July 30, 2003
- Styles
- Reference style: His Eminence
- Spoken style: Your Eminence
- Religious style: Cardinal
- Informal style: Cardinal
- See: Manila

Jaime Lachica Sin (Note: Chinese: 辛海梅, 辛海棉; Pe̍h-ōe-jī: Sin Hái-mûi, Sin Hái-mî) (August 31, 1928 – June 21, 2005) was a Filipino Catholic prelate who served as the 30th archbishop of Manila from 1974 until his retirement in 2003. He was elevated to the rank of cardinal by Pope Paul VI in 1976.

Born in New Washington, Aklan, Sin began his ministry as a priest in the Diocese of Capiz and later served as Archbishop of Jaro. He rose to national prominence as Archbishop of Manila during the martial law era under President Ferdinand Marcos. Initially adopting a conciliatory stance toward the government, Sin became increasingly vocal in his criticism of the Marcos administration, particularly following a military raid on the Sacred Heart Novitiate in Novaliches. He later played a pivotal role in the 1986 People Power Revolution by broadcasting a radio appeal for civilians to gather along Epifanio de los Santos Avenue (EDSA) to support military defectors against Marcos. In 2001, Sin issued a similar call to action, demanding the resignation of President Joseph Estrada during the Second EDSA Revolution.

Sin's continued political influence during the subsequent Aquino, Ramos, and Estrada administrations frequently drew scrutiny. Beyond his political involvement, Sin assisted Trappist monks in acquiring land for their monastery, established the Domus Mariae Foundation for social housing, and founded the Lorenzo Mission Institute and Lorenzo Ruiz Mission Society to train seminarians and priests ministering to Chinese Filipinos. The cardinal also hosted Pope John Paul II during his 1981 and 1995 pastoral visits to the Philippines, the latter being for World Youth Day.

He retired as archbishop on September 15, 2003. Sin died on June 21, 2005, at the age of 76, and was accorded state honors.

== Early life and education ==
Sin was born on August 31, 1928, in New Washington, Capiz, on the island of Panay. Born into a wealthy family, he was the fourteenth of sixteen children of Juan Sin, a merchant of Chinese descent, and Máxima Lachica, a native Aklanon. Known affectionately as "Jim" or "Ame," Sin shared a close bond with his mother, whose piety deeply influenced him. He showed an early interest in the priesthood, often preaching mock sermons as a child, and enrolled at the St. Vincent Ferrer Seminary in Iloilo at the age of 12.

Throughout his youth, Sin suffered from poor health and severe asthma. In 1954, while hospitalized, he resolved that a recurrence of his asthma would be a sign to forgo the priesthood. He wrote a letter to the Virgin Mary asking for a cure by November 27, the feast day of the Miraculous Medal, to confirm his vocation. He reportedly never suffered another attack and was ordained a priest six months later.

== Priest and bishop in Jaro (1954–1974) ==
=== Early ministry ===
Sin was ordained a priest for the Diocese of Capiz on April 3, 1954, at the age of 25. He began as a missionary known as "Father Ame" to peasants and farmers in the mountains of Capiz and Aklan. Following three years of missionary work, he served as the inaugural rector of St. Pius X Seminary in Lawaan Hills, Roxas City, from 1957 to 1967. During this tenure, he worked as principal, dean of studies, professor, and diocesan consultant. On February 29, 1960, Pope John XXIII elevated him to the rank of domestic prelate (now honorary prelate) on February 29, 1960, which granted him the title of monsignor.

On February 10, 1967, Sin was named titular bishop of Obba and auxiliary bishop of Jaro, receiving his episcopal consecration on March 18 of that year. He was appointed apostolic administrator of the Jaro archdiocese on June 20, 1970, temporarily governing the see during the tenure of Archbishop Jose Maria Cuenco. Subsequently, Pope Paul VI appointed him coadjuctor archbishop of Jaro with the right of succession and titular archbishop of Massa Lubrenese. Following Cuenco's death on October 8, 1972, Sin assumed office as the archbishop of Jaro.

=== Archbishop of Jaro and onset of martial law ===
Coat of arms of Sin as Archbishop of Jaro

During his installation address, Sin spoke about the growing unrest, marked by demonstrations and strikes, surrounding President Ferdinand Marcos's declaration of martial law. While acknowledging the country's severe political, economic, and social crises, Sin countered the prevailing hostility by calling for a "revolution of love".

Sin also assisted newly arrived Trappist monks in acquiring a site for a monastery in the Philippines. He contacted former senator and diplomat Oscar Ledesma, who donated 74 hectares of land in Jordan, Guimaras, where the Our Lady of the Philippines Trappist Monastery was established in 1972.

On January 29, 1973, during the semiannual meeting of the Catholic Bishops' Conference of the Philippines (CBCP) in Baguio City, Sin delivered an address to a Church hierarchy that was divided on how to interact with the Marcos administration. In his speech, given just four months into martial rule, Sin asserted that the Church operates independently of any specific government but must actively serve as the "conscience of mankind." This implied that the Church could continue its mission under an authoritarian government while reserving the right to intervene in secular affairs involving moral matters and fundamental human rights.

At the time—four months into martial law—Sin and the CBCP did not advocate for an immediate change to the political status quo, provided that the Church retained its freedom to preach and the state respected human rights. Sin proposed an approach of "wholesome cooperation" with the political community to promote the common good. Despite earlier political divisions among the prelates, the CBCP ultimately united behind Sin's framework.

== Archbishop of Manila (1974–2003) ==
=== Appointment and cardinalate ===
Sin was appointed Archbishop of Manila on January 21, 1974, becoming the third native Filipino and second Visayan in the capital’s see. He was initially reluctant to accept the role, which effectively made him de facto leader of the Church in the Philippines. Sin was formally installed on March 19, 1974. One of his first acts as archbishop was to restructure the archdiocese's charity arm that same year, rebranding Catholic Charities established by his predecessor Cardinal Rufino Santos, as Caritas Manila.

Alongside his duties as archbishop, Sin held prominent leadership roles within the national Church. He served as the vice president of the Catholic Bishops' Conference of the Philippines (CBCP) starting in January 1974, and was subsequently elected as its president in 1977, and re-elected in 1979. He later chaired the CBCP's commissions on Mass Media and the Pontificio Collegio Filippino in 1982.

On May 24, 1976, Pope Paul VI elevated Sin to the College of Cardinals, appointing him cardinal priest of the titular church of Santa Maria ai Monti. At the age of 47, Sin became the youngest cardinal in the Catholic Church at the time. Following his elevation to the cardinalate, Sin became deeply involved in the Roman Curia. He was made a permanent member of the Synod of Bishops in Rome in October 1977. Throughout the late 1970s and 1980s, the Vatican appointed him to numerous administrative bodies. His memberships included the Sacred Congregations for the Evangelization of Peoples, Catholic Education, Bishops, the Clergy, and Divine Worship and the Sacraments. Additionally, he served on the Prefecture for the Economic Affairs of the Holy See, the Secretariat for Non-Christians, the Pontifical Commission for Social Communications, and the Council for Public Affairs of the Church.

As Cardinal, Sin would often greet people at his home by saying "welcome to the House of Sin". This was due to his name being the inaptronym for a Catholic Cardinal due to it being a play on cardinal sin.

Sin participated as a cardinal elector in the August and October conclaves of 1978, which elected Pope John Paul I and Pope John Paul II, respectively. According to reports, when it became apparent that Cardinal Albino Luciani would receive the required number of votes during the August conclave, Sin told him, "You will become the new pope." During Sin's subsequent homage, John Paul I reportedly replied, "You were a prophet, but my reign will be a short one." John Paul I passed away less than 40 days later.

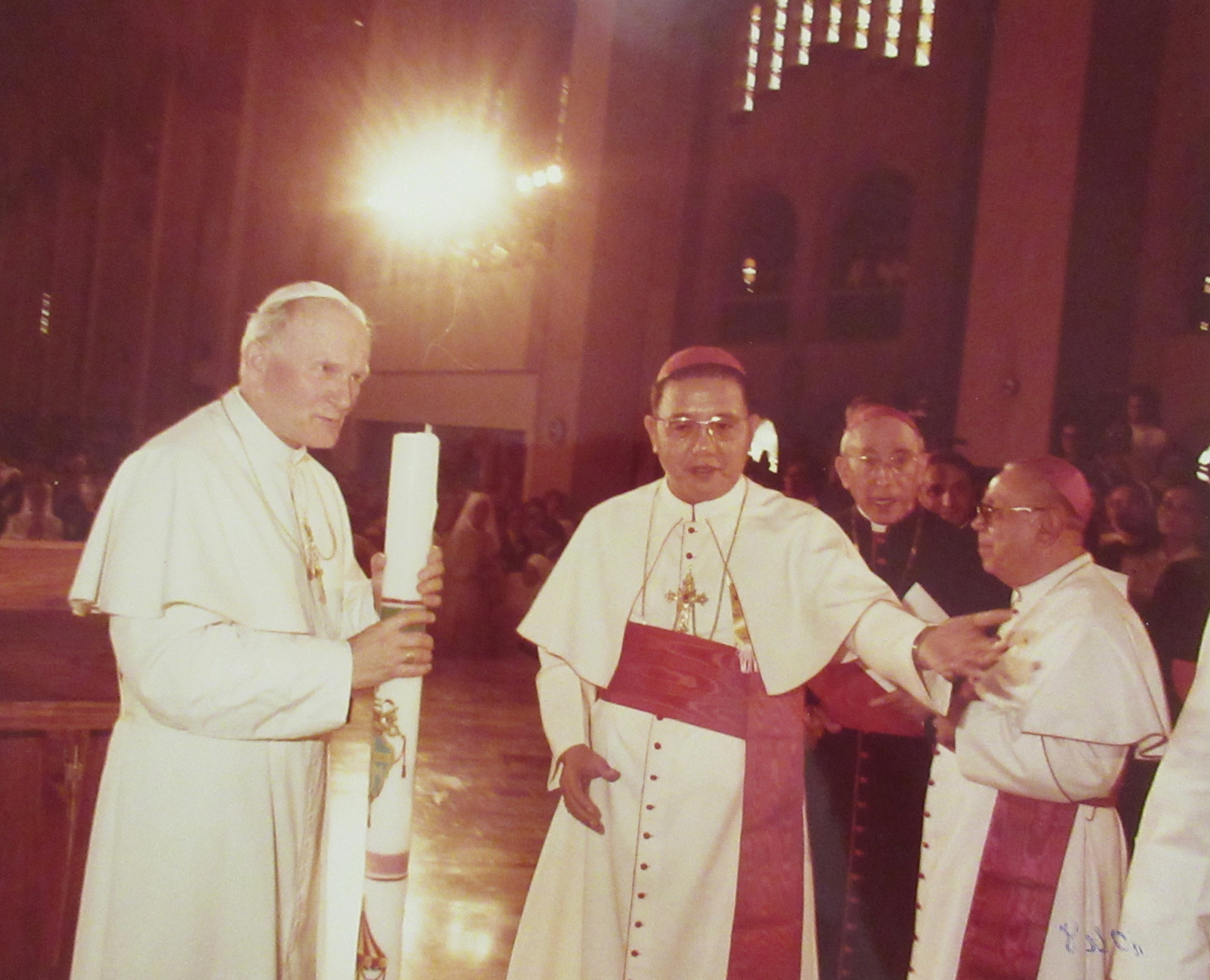
Pope John Paul II and Sin at Baclaran Church in 1981

In 1981, the cardinal hosted Pope John Paul II during the pontiff's first pastoral visit to the Philippines. Later, in February 1983, Sin founded the Domus Mariae Foundation as the social housing arm of the Archdiocese of Manila.

=== Martial law and EDSA Revolution ===
==== Early critical collaboration ====
During his installation as archbishop in March 1974, Sin’s address highlighted the socioeconomic disparities exacerbated by martial law. He renewed the call for a "revolution of love" that he had first made during his episcopacy in Jaro. Addressing the separation of church and state, Sin argued that separation did not equate to isolation. He further criticized the Marcos administration's definition of subversion and its censorship of the press.

Sin was considered part of the moderate faction among Philippine bishops. While a traditionalist minority preferred to keep the Church out of secular matters, and a radical minority actively supported marginalized groups through more vocal opposition, Sin and the moderate majority adopted a framework of "critical collaboration" with the Marcos administration. Under this framework, the Church would cooperate with the government when it acted "alright," but would reserve the right to criticize failures or abuses of power. Sin later elaborated on this framework in a 1985 interview with The Diliman Review:

Critical collaboration is important because there is separation of the church and state. It is like a railroad track; they cannot be close to one another. Because the Church is serving the same people the government is supposed to serve. And so this separation is not isolation; it is collaboration. It may be critical in the sense that we should try to voice out and articulate what we feel against the failure of the government. If they (the government) are doing alright [sic], we should be one of those who should encourage. And if they are not doing alright [sic] we should be first to criticize.

Early in his tenure, Sin largely accepted the government's justifications for martial law, believing it was necessary to prevent a communist revolution. He initially argued the human rights abuses were done by rogue military officers rather than systemic government policy.

==== 1974 novitiate raid and increasing dissent ====
Sin's stance toward the Marcos administration shifted to vocal opposition following a military raid on August 24, 1974. Forces led by General Próspero Olivas raided the Jesuits’ Sacred Heart Novitiate in Novaliches in search of Communist Party of the Philippines chairman Jose Maria Sison. During the operation, the military arrested Benigno Mayo, the Jesuit provincial superior, after mistaking him for Sison because he drove a similar car. Jesuit priest Jose Blanco and 21 Catholic youth leaders were also among those arrested. In response, Sin organized a protest Mass at Manila Cathedral and issued a strongly worded pastoral letter to be read in all churches. This action has been widely described as his first major official denunciation of the Marcos government.

Ahead of the 1978 Philippine parliamentary election, Sin issued a pastoral letter as Archbishop of Manila. The letter, which was read at all Masses, stated that martial law had deprived citizens of the right to choose their leaders and demanded that the upcoming elections be free and fair. Following the election, the CBCP, under Sin's presidency, released an open letter accusing the Marcos administration of violating human rights and committing electoral fraud. However, Sin maintained his stance of "critical collaboration," as he avoided explicitly naming Marcos or acknowledging the systemic nature of the human rights abuses. Through a pastoral letter written by Sin, the CBCP expressed that widespread poverty was making a communist revolution attractive to marginalized groups, implying that martial law remained a preferable alternative to a communist takeover.

When martial law was nominally lifted in January 1981, Sin suggested postponing the presidential election and referendum scheduled for that year until the "credibility of the government is restored." In response, Marcos quoted a 1947 address by Pope Pius XII to claim it was a "mortal sin not to vote." Sin countered by asserting that the right to refuse to vote was a matter of individual conscience.

On August 21, 1983, former senator and opposition leader Ninoy Aquino was assassinated. Ten days later, Sin presided over Aquino's funeral at Santo Domingo Church in Quezon City, and in his homily he preached the loss of freedom had "reduced the Filipino to being an exile in his own country." He centered his funeral oration on the theme of "peace." Sin later declined an invitation to serve on the fact-finding commission established by Marcos to investigate Aquino's murder, stating he would merely be a "dissenting voice in the wilderness." Instead, he supported the establishment of Veritas, an alternative publication dedicated to the principles of a free press. Sin supported Corazon Aquino, Ninoy's widow, in calls to end martial law.

In January 1986, ahead of the February snap election, Sin issued a pastoral letter titled "A Call To Conscience." He advised voters to refuse bribe money, or, if they felt compelled to accept it, to remember that an immoral contract is not legally or morally binding. Following the election, Sin arranged safe houses for 35 computer operators who walked out of the Commission on Elections tabulation center in Pasay in protest of alleged fraud. The protesting tabulators initially sought refuge in Baclaran Church, and Sin later celebrated a Mass to honor their "true awakening."

==== 1986 Radio Veritas call to EDSA ====
On February 22, 1986, Sin learned of Minister of National Defense Juan Ponce Enrile's plan to withdraw his support for Marcos through Betty Go-Belmonte, after Enrile had earlier attempted to phone the archbishop directly. Later that afternoon, Enrile called Sin, expressing fear for his life and asking for help. According to Socrates Villegas, Sin's secretary at the time, the cardinal was initially cautious about the authenticity of the defections of Enrile and Armed Forces vice chief Fidel Ramos. He was eventually convinced following a visit from National Citizens' Movement for Free Elections (NAMFREL) head Jose Concepcion Jr. at the cardinal's archiepiscopal palace, Villa San Miguel.

After retreating to his private chapel for prayer, Sin drafted a statement on a piece of scrap paper and called Church-owned radio station Radio Veritas to broadcast his appeal:

This is Cardinal Sin speaking. I am calling our people to support our two good friends at the camp. If any of you could be around at Camp Aguinaldo to show your solidarity and your support in this very crucial period when our two good friends have shown their idealism, I would be very happy. Please come. Lend your support to Enrile and Ramos and protect them. And bring them food; they have nothing to eat.

This broadcast, along with Butz Aquino's earlier radio appeal, mobilized thousands of civilians. Led by priests and nuns, crowds gathered along Epifanio de los Santos Avenue (EDSA) and effectively launched the People Power Revolution. On February 23, Sin reportedly received intelligence that Marcos had ordered his arrest and detainment on Caballo Island. Despite the threat, he declined Villegas's suggestion to relocate to a safe house. The arrest was never carried out, as Marcos and his family fled the Philippines for Hawaiʻi on the night of February 25. Sin remained at Villa San Miguel in prayer throughout the duration of the revolution.

=== Post-EDSA Revolution ===
After Corazon Aquino was sworn in as president, Sin announced a shift in his political stance from "critical collaboration" to "critical solidarity" with the new government.

Sin temporarily distanced himself from domestic politics and traveled abroad, including a tour of the Soviet Union and a visit to China, his father's birthplace. The latter trip allowed the cardinal to report directly to Pope John Paul II regarding his encounters with Chinese Catholics. In 1987, Sin founded the Lorenzo Mission Institute, a seminary designed to train priests to minister to Chinese Filipinos and the Catholic Church in China. The institute was named in honor of Saint Lorenzo Ruiz, a Chinese Filipino who is recognized as the Philippines' protomartyr. A decade later, Sin decreed the creation of the Lorenzo Ruiz Mission Society—a diocesan society of priests dedicated to missions among Chinese and Chinese Filipino communities—and announced its official recognition by the Vatican.

Sin remained an influential figure throughout the Aquino administration. He publicly opposed the return of Ferdinand Marcos's remains to the Philippines and defended the secretary of agrarian reform at the height of land reform controversies. He also criticized the administration's economic policies involving the International Monetary Fund, arguing that they introduced burdensome taxes and price hikes. During the 1989 Philippine coup attempt against the Aquino government, Sin condemned the rebel soldiers as "enemies of justice and freedom" who were attempting to destroy democracy.

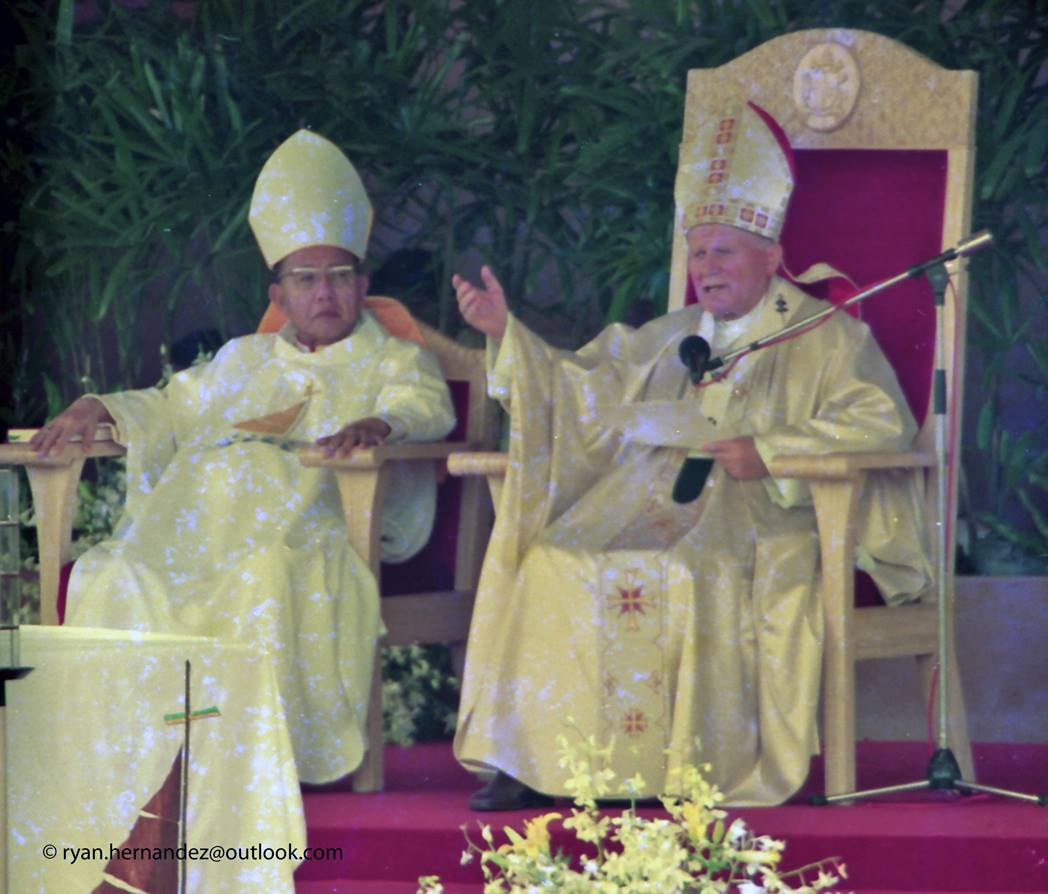
Sin and Pope John Paul II during a World Youth Day 1995 Mass

Ahead of the 1992 Philippine presidential election, which resulted in the election of Fidel V. Ramos, Sin maintained that the Church had an obligation to help voters choose freely and to protect election integrity. He issued pastoral guidelines urging the electorate to reject candidates who were "plunderers and looters" or who had practiced "crony capitalism" during the Marcos era.

In January 1995, Sin and several volunteers helped organize the 10th World Youth Day, which hosted Pope John Paul II in Manila. Later that year, Sin publicly criticized Ramos, referring to him as a "Marcos clone." The cardinal actively opposed several government initiatives, including population control measures involving condoms and the proposed issuance of national identification cards. In 1997, Sin and Aquino led anti-charter change rallies, which successfully pressured Ramos to abandon plans to amend the 1987 Constitution to allow for his reelection.

=== 2001 EDSA II protests against Estrada ===
Joseph Estrada, a candidate the Catholic Church had opposed, was elected president in 1998. The following year, Sin accused Estrada of curbing press freedom and striking secret deals with former Marcos cronies. The cardinal also opposed Estrada's attempts at constitutional reform, actively attending rallies against the proposed amendments.

In 2001, when impeachment proceedings against Estrada began over allegations of plunder and perjury, Sin advised the president to resign, stating that "he had lost the moral authority to govern." After prosecutors walked out of Estrada's trial when the Senate refused to unseal key evidence, Sin called on Filipinos to gather at the EDSA Shrine for a massive prayer rally. The gathering was attended by thousands, including military and business leaders. There, Sin appealed to government forces to support a constitutional successor to Estrada. Declaring, "We know in our hearts that the president is guilty," Sin urged the crowds to remain at the shrine "until evil is conquered by good."

Jaime Sin observes from behind as Chief Justice Hilario Davide swears in Gloria Macapagal Arroyo as president at the EDSA Shrine.

Estrada ultimately resigned from the presidency, and Vice President Gloria Macapagal Arroyo was sworn in as his successor in Sin's presence. Two years later, in July 2003, the cardinal urged public vigilance against groups attempting coups against Arroyo. Months prior to that, impoverished supporters of Estrada's anti-poverty campaign had stormed presidential palace in a failed uprising known as EDSA III. Although he did not support this uprising, Sin issued an apology, acknowledging that the Philippine Catholic Church had often neglected the country's poor.

According to later reports, two days into the anti-Estrada protests at EDSA, Sin received a directive from the Vatican to withdraw Church involvement and maintain a non-partisan stance. He reportedly refused to obey, threatening to resign as archbishop rather than abandon his support for the protests. The standoff was allegedly resolved through the mediation of Supreme Court Justice Artemio Panganiban, a member of the Pontifical Council for the Laity in the Vatican's Roman Curia. Neither the Vatican nor the Archdiocese of Manila ever officially confirmed these reports.

== Retirement and final years ==
During his final years, Sin's declining health prevented him from intervening in or sanctioning political actions regarding the corruption allegations against President Arroyo.

Sin retired as the archbishop of Manila on September 15, 2003. He was succeeded by the Lipa Archbishop, Gaudencio Rosales, who was installed on November 21, 2003. In a parting statement, the former archbishop remarked, "As I enter a new chapter in my twilight years, I can say with gratitude that I have given my very best to God and country... I beg pardon from those I might have led astray or hurt. Please remember me kindly."

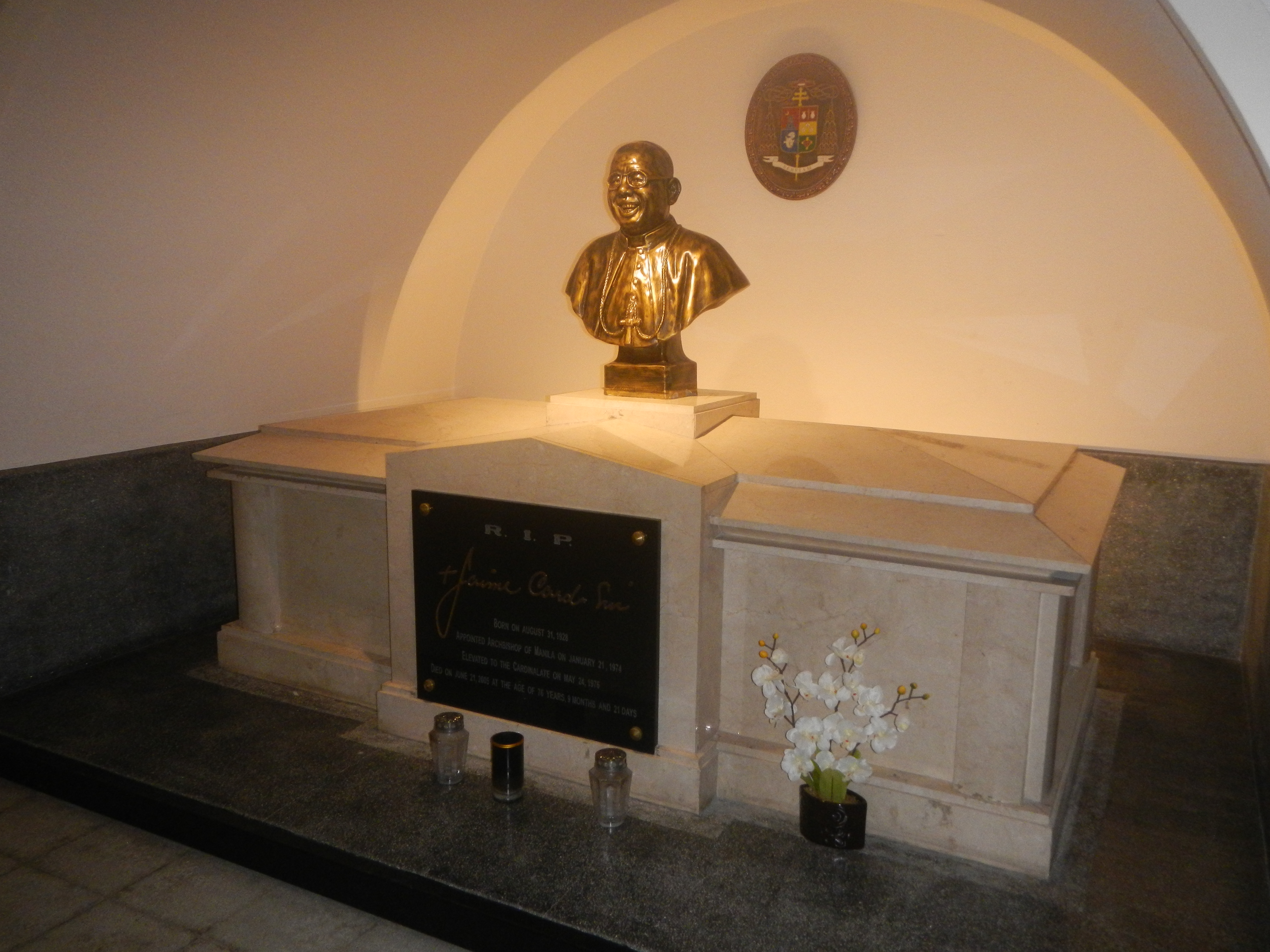
Tomb and bust of Jaime Sin at the Manila Cathedral crypt

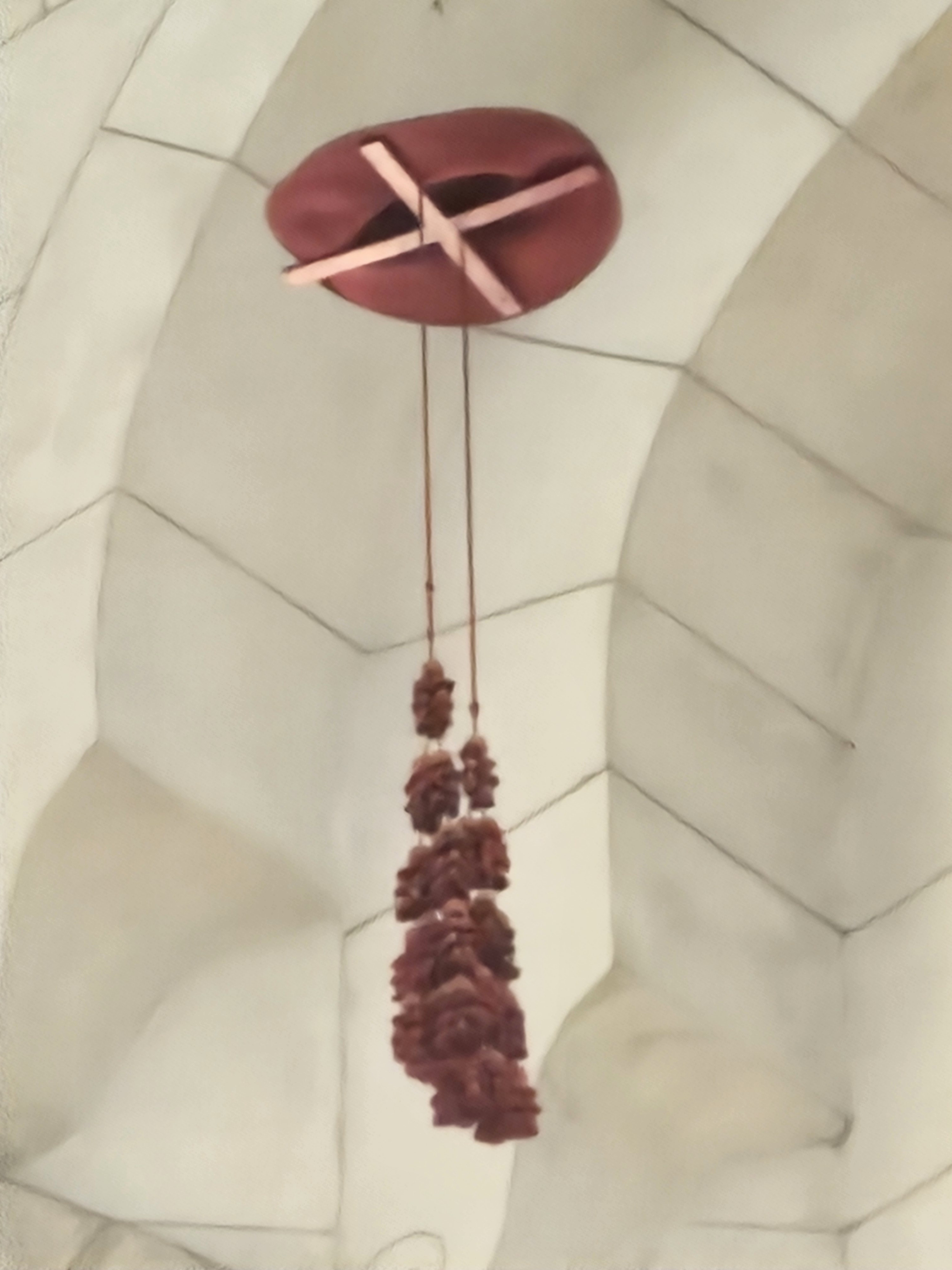
Sin's galero, a hat traditionally given to and worn by cardinals, hangs on display from the ceiling of the Manila Cathedral.

The cardinal's later years were marked by severe ill health, including kidney and heart problems, as well as diabetes. His condition prevented him from attending the 2005 papal conclave. Jun Sescon, a priest who served as Sin's spokesperson, attributed the cardinal's worsening condition to the death of Pope John Paul II, which had deeply affected him. On June 19, 2005, Sin was admitted to the Cardinal Santos Medical Center with a high fever and suffering from multiple organ failure. He died of kidney failure two days later on June 21, at the age of 76, with Socrates Villegas at his side.

President Gloria Macapagal Arroyo accorded him a state funeral and declared a period of national mourning. On June 28, following a funeral Mass attended by thousands, Sin was buried alongside his predecessors in the crypt of the Manila Cathedral. His death in 2005 remains the most recent among the Archbishops of Manila; his three successors - Gaudencio Rosales, Luis Antonio Tagle, and Jose Advincula - are still alive.

== Honors and legacy ==
=== Orders ===
- Philippine Legion of Honor, chief commander (1992)
- Order of Sikatuna, grand collar (1999)
- Order of Lakandula, grand cross, rank of Bayani (December 8, 2003)
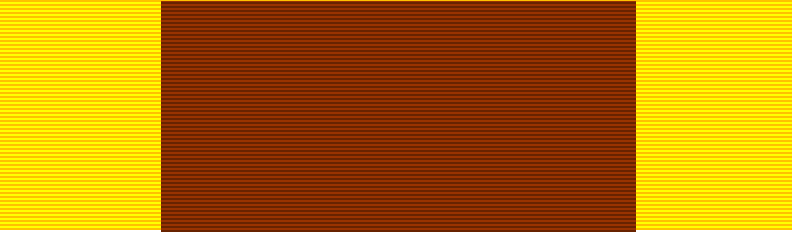
- Knights of Rizal, knight grand cross of Rizal
- Order of Isabella the Catholic, knight grand cross (June 24, 1977)

=== Honorary degrees ===
Sin received several honoris causa degrees from institutions in the Philippines and abroad:

- Doctor of Business Administration
  - Polytechnic University of the Philippines (May 4, 1995)
- Doctor of Divinity
  - Yale University (May 26, 1986)
- Doctor of Humane Letters
  - De La Salle University (June 22, 1975)
  - Brandeis University (May 20, 1984)
  - University of San Francisco (April 8, 1986)
  - Georgetown University (May 25, 1986)
  - St. Michael's College (May 17, 1987)
  - University of San Diego (June 18, 1988)
- Doctor of Humanities
  - University of San Agustin (March 23, 1980)
  - Stonehill College (May 18, 1986)
  - University of Portland (May 3, 1987)
  - Lewis University (May 12, 1987)
  - University of the East (May 5, 1989)
  - University of Notre Dame (1989)
  - St. Thomas More University (April 27, 1992)
  - Ateneo de Naga University (March 16, 2001)
- Doctor of Laws
  - Adamson University (March 1975)
  - Angeles University (March 15, 1978)
  - Manhattan College (September 21, 1984)
  - Seton Hall University (May 31, 1986)
- Doctor of Letters
  - Republic Central Colleges (April 4, 1982)
- Doctor of Pedagogy
  - Assumption University (San Fernando, Pampanga) (March 31, 1981)
- Doctor of Philosophy in Humane Letters
  - Ateneo de Manila University (March 29, 1980)
  - Fu Jen Catholic University (December 10, 1980)
- Doctor of Sacred Theology
  - University of Santo Tomas (March 26, 1977)
  - Boston College (May 19, 1986)
  - Santa Clara University (May 14, 1987)
- Doctor of Social Philosophy
  - Loras College (May 14, 1989)
- Doctor of Sociology
  - Aquinas University (February 22, 1985)

=== Museo Kardinal ===
The municipality of New Washington, Aklan, also hosts the Museo Kardinal, a museum dedicated to the life of Sin, which is housed within his former residence.

== Public views ==
=== Reproductive health ===
In 1996, Sin opposed the Ramos administration's program to curb HIV/AIDS rates by distributing condoms, branding the initiative as "intrinsically evil." The cardinal was broadly against artificial birth control, including the use of condoms. He reportedly stated that condoms were "only fit for animals." As early as 1992, ahead of the presidential election, he urged voters to choose a president and vice president "who will put an end to the active promotion of mechanical means and artificial devices of birth control." The cardinal's position aligned closely with established Catholic views on birth control. When asked about the country's high population growth, Sin reportedly dismissed concerns by responding, "The more, the merrier."

Sin attended rallies where Health Secretary Juan Flavier was publicly criticized, and the cardinal himself suggested that supporters of artificial birth control should be thrown into the sea with millstones tied around their necks. Flavier responded with humor, stating, "They say I'm an agent of lechery or incest or promiscuity... My answer was, how can I be an agent of these things when I can't even spell them. I feel sad, especially when people resort to name-calling." He later clarified his stance toward the Church in an interview: "In fairness to them, they have a job to perform—that is to protect the faith—and they honestly believe natural family planning is the only way to go... I tell them, if you're a Catholic and you don't want the condom or the pill, don't use it."

=== Church-state relations ===
Sin generally accepted the separation of church and state but asserted that the concept "should not mean isolation" and that he retained his right to speak out as a citizen. He actively maintained that the Church's intervention in secular matters was sometimes necessary, stating that the institution "could not hide behind a principle of separation of Church and State not to get involved when the forces of evil conspire to rob a people of its dignity and will, as was the case when Marcos stole the election." In his 1974 installation address as the archbishop of Manila, the cardinal elaborated on his stance:

And to all honorable Civil Officials here present. May I say this: The separation between Church and State is a reality that I accept, a fact of political life that I have learned to live with. This separation I do not challenge, this I will not seek to change. But separation should not necessarily mean isolation. Nor should it connote the absence of collaboration ... the Church and State are two entities working for an identical goal. Their labors ... are on two different planes—one temporal, the other spiritual—but their goal is the same ... good citizenship. For the State, it is citizenship in this world ... in the here and now. For the Church it is good citizenship too, in preparation for the next world, the hereafter.

=== Other views ===
Sin denounced the 1983 Manila International Film Festival, which included screenings of pornographic films permitted by Ferdinand Marcos to raise government funds. The cardinal called the event a "festival of sex" and questioned the public's lack of condemnation, asking if Filipinos had become "a nation of sheep" or "dumb, driven cattle."

Sin also opposed the use of the death penalty, which President Fidel Ramos reimposed in 1993. He publicly called for the commutation of the death sentences of convicted rapists Leo Echegaray and Alex Bartolome, who were executed in February 1999 and January 2000, respectively. Bartolome was the last prisoner executed in the country.

He also voiced opposition to the United States' 2003 invasion of Iraq and publicly criticized the Philippine government for supporting the military action.

== Coat of arms ==
Coat of arms of Jaime Sin
Helm A cardinal's galero with cords and thirty tassels, arranged in five rows of one, two, three, four, and five on either side of the shield. Escutcheon Two coats impaled. The dexter side, representing the Archdiocese of Manila, features a red (Gules) chief bearing a gold (Or) tower of Castile and a crescent, and a blue (Azure) base displaying a sea-lion engarde holding a gold cross. The sinister side, representing his personal arms, features a red chief with two escallops and a gold pilgrim's staff; a gold fess displaying three red roses; and a green (Vert) base with a gold cross debruised by a red, rose-garlanded heart. Motto Serviam (Latin for 'I will serve') Other elements Behind the shield is a double-traversed archiepiscopal cross in gold (Or). Symbolism The escallops and pilgrim's staff are attributes of James the Great, Sin's patron saint. The three roses represent Our Lady of the Holy Rosary as the Mystical Rose, the patroness of Sin's hometown. The cross and rose-garlanded heart symbolize Sin's "willingness to carry the cross" and, if need be, to "be affixed to it." Previous versions As titular bishop As coadjuctor archbishop of Jaro As archbishop of Jaro As archbishop of Manila, prior to cardinalate

== Notes ==
Catholic Church titles
Preceded by Paul Aijirô Yamaguchi	— TITULAR — Titular Bishop of Massa Lubrense; February 10, 1967 – October 8, 1972	Succeeded by Robert Fealey Morneau
Preceded by Julio Rosales	President of the Catholic Bishops' Conference of the Philippines; 1976–1981	Succeeded by Antonio Lloren Mabutas
Preceded by José María Cuenco	Archbishop of Jaro; October 8, 1972 – January 21, 1974	Succeeded by Artemio Casas
Preceded by Rufino Santos	Archbishop of Manila; March 19, 1974 – September 15, 2003	Succeeded by Gaudencio Rosales
Preceded by Rufino Santos	Cardinal Priest of S. Maria ai Monti; May 24, 1976 – June 21, 2005	Succeeded by Jorge Urosa
