= Apostolic Vicariate of Puerto Princesa =

Catholic missionary jurisdiction in Philippines

Apostolic Vicariate of Puerto Princesa Apostolicus Vicariatus Portus Principis in Philippins Apostolikal na Bikarato i’ang Puerto Princesa Bikaryato Apostoliko ng Puerto Princesa Vicariato Apostólico de Puerto Princesa

Catholic
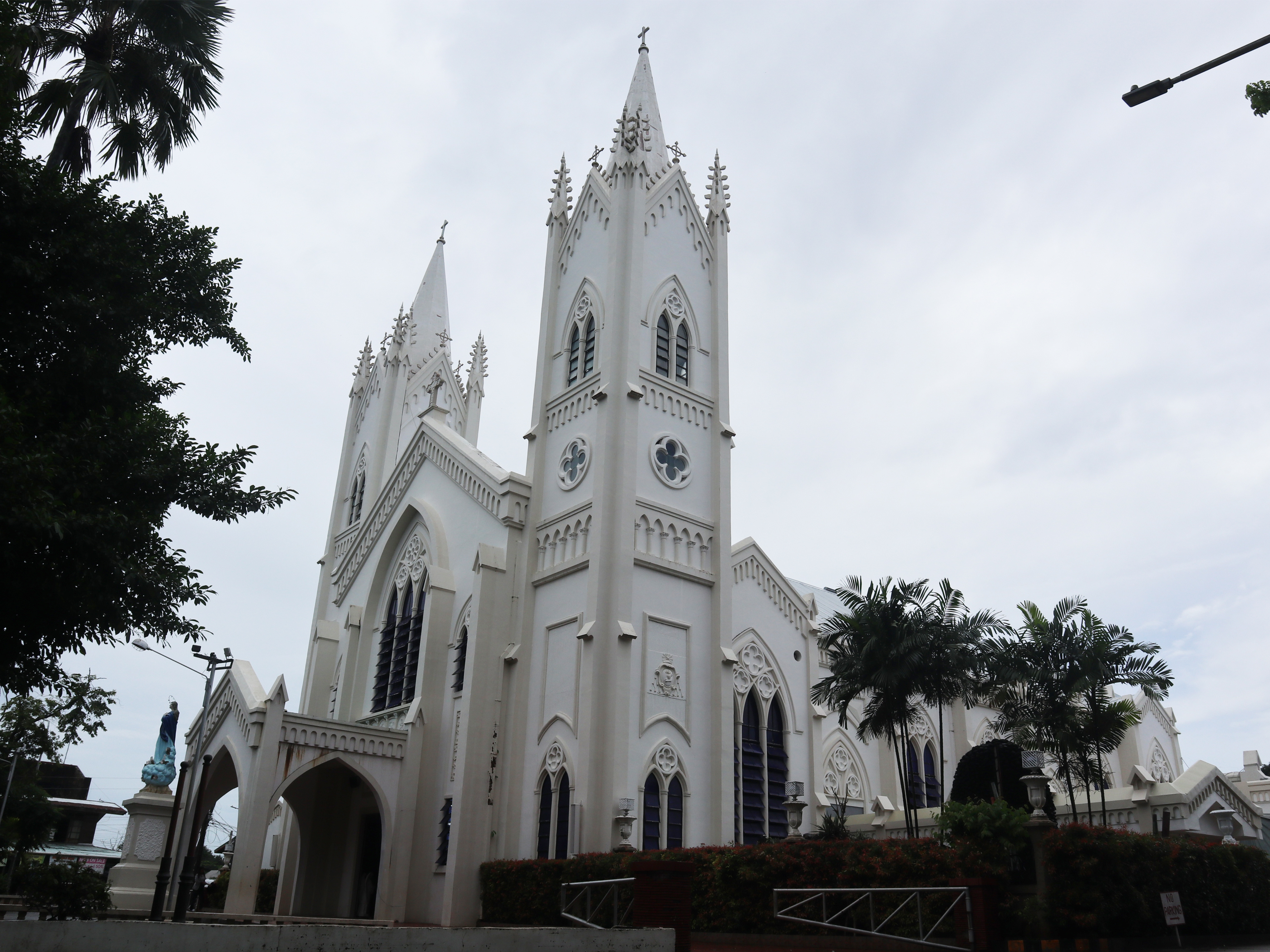
- Puerto Princesa Cathedral

- Coat of arms

Location
- Country: Philippines
- Territory: City of Puerto Princesa, Municipality of Cagayancillo and the Southern Palawan's Municipalities, namely: Aborlan, Narra, Palawan, Quezon, Palawan, Rizal, Palawan, Sofronio Española, Brooke's Point, Bataraza, Balabac and Kalayaan, Palawan.
- Ecclesiastical province: Immediately subject to the Holy See
- Headquarters: Puerto Princesa
- Coordinates: 9°44′24″N 118°43′50″E

Statistics
- Area: 8,800 km^{2} (3,400 sq mi)
- Population: Total; Catholics: (as of 2021); 836,615; 536,225 (64.1%)
- Parishes: 35

Information
- Denomination: Catholic
- Sui iuris church: Latin Church
- Rite: Roman Rite
- Established: July 3, 1955
- Cathedral: Immaculate Conception Cathedral
- Patron saint: Saint Joseph
- Secular priests: 60

Current leadership
- Pope: Leo XIV
- Vicar Apostolic: Socrates Calamba Mesiona
- Vicar General: Jesusinio Panganiban, Jr.
- Bishops emeritus: a

Map
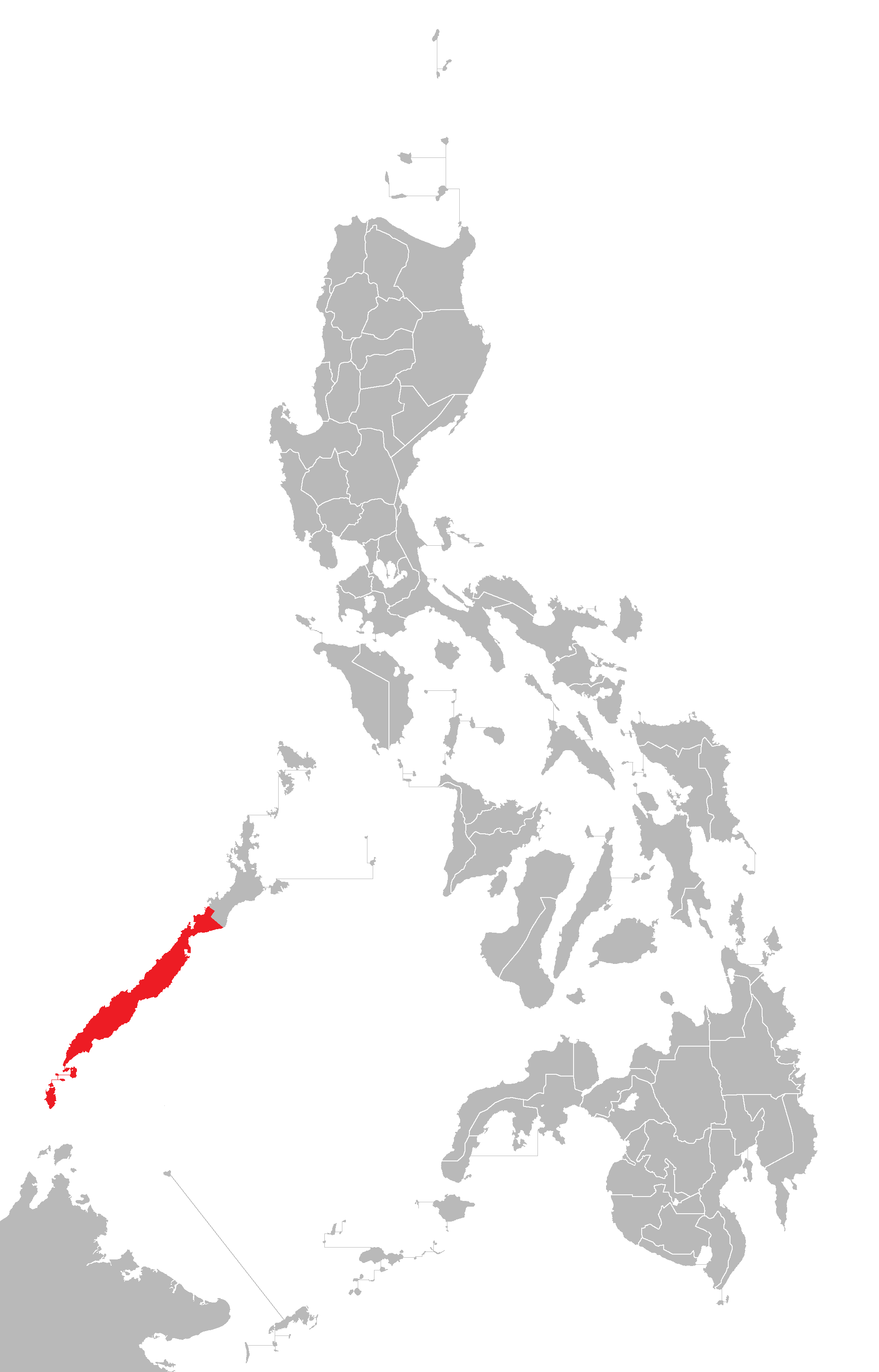
- Jurisdiction of the Apostolic Vicariate of Puerto Princesa

Website
- cbcponline.net/most-rev-socrates-mesiona/
- Source of statistics: Apostolic Vicariate of Puerto Princesa

The Apostolic Vicariate of Puerto Princesa is a Latin Catholic missionary jurisdiction or apostolic vicariate of the Catholic Church located in the Province of Palawan, Philippines. Its cathedra is within Immaculate Conception Cathedral in the episcopal see of Puerto Princesa City, Palawan, Philippines. It is not a part of an ecclesiastical province as it is directly exempt to the Holy See, specifically the Congregation for the Evangelization of Peoples, yet for the purpose of apostolic cooperation usually grouped with the Ecclesiastical Province of Manila, along with the Roman Catholic Apostolic Vicariate of Taytay. The current vicar apostolic is Bishop Socrates Calamba Mesiona.

== History ==
The establishment as prefectura apostolica was announced and celebrated on April 10, 1910, a great day among the Recollect priests. In the bull of the founding of Pope Pius X entitled "Novas Erigere Diocese" (Newly established Dioceses) the Prefectura Apostolica de Palawan was mentioned along with the elevated levels of the Dioceses of Lipa, Tuguegarao, Zamboanga and Calbayog. The prefectura apostolica is administered by the Sacred Congregation of the Propagation of Faith to the Recollect priests as stated in Protocol No. 837/910 on May 13, 1910, sent by Girolamo Maria Cotti, the prefect, and Luigi Veccia, the secretary.

On July 3, 1955, Rome declared the elevation of the prefectura apostolica to the Apostolic Vicariate of Palawan (AVP) by a bull entitled "Ad Christi Regnum" (The Reign of Christ) signed by Pope Pius XII. Bishop Gregorio Espiga y Infante was the first vicar apostolic of Palawan. He became bishop on September 10, 1955, in the church of San Sebastian, Manila, as titular bishop of Afneo. He formally took office on September 18, 1955.

On March 27, 2002, it was renamed as the Apostolic Vicariate of Puerto Princesa and lost part of its territory when the Apostolic Vicariate of Taytay was established.

== Coat of arms ==
The two lilies represent Saint Joseph, the patron saint whom the founding Augustinian Recollect fathers dedicated the local church of Palawan. The crescent represents the Immaculate Conception, the patroness of the cathedral. The fort actually represents the fort of Cuyo, where the first missionary arrived on August 1622, as well as the other ports in the province of Palawan built by the Augustinian Recollect fathers to protect their mission and their faithful from depredations of the Moros from the south.

== List of ordinaries ==
The early ordinaries were missionary members of the Order of Augustinian Recollects (O.A.R.).

Apostolic prefects of Palawan (1911–1955)

Apostolic prefect		Period in office	Status
1.	Fr. Victoriano Romàn Zárate di S. Giuseppe, O.A.R.	April 21, 1911 – 1936	Died in office
2.	Fr. Leandro Nieto y Bolandier, O.A.R.	November 25, 1938 – 1942	Died in office
3.	Fr. Gregorio Espiga e Infante, O.A.R.	1954 – July 03, 1955	Appointed as the first vicar apostolic of Palawan

Vicars apostolic of Palawan (1955–2002)

Bishop		Period in office	Status	Coat of arms
1.	Gregorio Espiga y Infante, O.A.R.	July 03, 1955 – December 18, 1987	Resigned	
2.	Francisco Capiral San Diego	December 18, 1987 – July 12, 1995	Transferred to Diocese of San Pablo	
3.	Pedro Dulay Arigo	February 23, 1996 – March 27, 2002	Remained as vicar apostolic of Puerto Princesa	

Vicars apostolic of Puerto Princesa

Bishop		Period in office	Status	Coat of arms
1.	Pedro Dulay Arigo	March 27, 2002 – October 28, 2016	Retired	
2.	Socrates Calamba Mesiona	October 28, 2016 – present	Incumbent	

== See also ==
- Catholic Church in the Philippines
- List of Catholic dioceses in the Philippines
- Catholic Church hierarchy
