= Kidane Yebio =

Eritrean Catholic bishop (born 1958)

Most Reverend Kidane Yebio
- Eparchial Bishop of Keren
- Church: Eritrean Catholic Church
- Province: Asmara
- Appointed: 4 January 2003
- Installed: 2 March 2003
- Predecessor: Tesfamariam Bedho
- Previous post: Protosyncellus of Keren (1996–2002)

Orders
- Ordination: 30 June 1985
- Consecration: 2 March 2003 by Menghesteab Tesfamariam, Luca Milesi, Thomas Osman

Personal details
- Born: Kidane Yebio; 25 January 1958 (age 68) Shinnara, Ethiopia (now Eritrea)
- Education: Pontifical University of Saint Thomas Aquinas, Pontifical Oriental Institute

Kidane Yebio (born 25 January 1958) is an Eritrean Catholic hierarch who has served as the Eparch of the Eparchy of Keren since 2003. Until 2015 he belonged to the Ethiopian Catholic Church sui iuris. (Note: Until 2015 not existed separated Eritrean Catholic Church sui iuris, and Eparchies in Eritrea belonged to the Ethiopian Catholic Church sui iuris.)

== Early life and education ==
Kidane Yebio was born on 25 January 1958 in Shinnara, now in Northern Red Sea region, Eritrea. He attended elementary school at St. Joseph's in Keren (1969–1973) before entering the minor seminary in Keren in 1974. He completed his secondary education and preparatory studies at the major seminary in Asmara between 1976 and 1980.

Between 1980 and 1982, he studied biology at Asmara University before pursuing theological studies at the Theological Institute of Asmara. He was ordained a priest on 30 June 1985. Following his ordination, he studied in Rome, earning a Licentiate in Biblical Theology from the Pontifical University of Saint Thomas Aquinas (1988) and a Licentiate in Oriental Canon Law from the Pontifical Oriental Institute (1990).

== Priesthood ==
Returning to Eritrea in 1991, Yebio served as a pastor in Haddish Addi and directed the major seminary in Asmara (1992–1993). In 1993, he was appointed Vicar General for the Western Eparchial Vicariate of Keren. Following the formal establishment of the Eparchy of Keren in 1995, he served as its Protosyncellus from 1996 until 2002. During this period, he was active in translating the New Testament and various liturgical prayers into the Bilin language.

== Episcopal ministry ==
On 4 January 2003, Pope John Paul II appointed Yebio as the second Eparch of Keren, succeeding Tesfamariam Bedho. He received his episcopal consecration on 2 March 2003 from Bishop Menghesteab Tesfamariam, with bishops Luca Milesi and Thomas Osman serving as co-consecrators.

On 19 January 2015, Pope Francis established the Eritrean Catholic Church as a new Metropolitan church sui iuris, separating it from the Ethiopian Catholic Church. Consequently, Yebio and the Eparchy of Keren were transferred from the jurisdiction of the Ethiopian Metropolitanate to the newly formed Eritrean jurisdiction under the Archeparchy of Asmara.

As Eparch, Yebio has addressed the challenges facing the Catholic Church in Eritrea, including the forced seizure of church-run health centers and clinics by the government in 2019. In 2025, he participated in the presentation of the new Catholic Missal in the Ge'ez language, a project aimed at standardizing and revitalizing the liturgical life of the Eritrean and Ethiopian Catholic Churches.
