= Tesfamariam =

Tesfamariam (Tigrinya: ተስፋማርያም, Amharic: ተስፋማርያም; from ተስፋ (tesfa) "hope" and ማርያም (mariyami) "Mary") is an Eritrean and Ethiopian surname and given name. Notable people with the name include:

== Given name ==
- Tesfamariam Bedho (1934–2002), Eritrean bishop of the Ethiopian Catholic Church

== Surname ==
- Menghesteab Tesfamariam (born 1948), Eritrean bishop of the Eritrean Catholic Church
- Yohannes Gebremeskel Tesfamariam (born 1960), Ethiopian general
- Sophia Tesfamariam Yohannes Eritrean ambassador
