= Fikremariam Hagos Tsalim =

Eritrean Catholic bishop (born 1970)

Most Reverend Fikremariam Hagos Tsalim
- Bishop of Segheneity
- Church: Eritrean Catholic Church
- See: Eparchy of Segheneity
- Appointed: 24 February 2012

Orders
- Ordination: 21 July 1996 by Zekarias Yohannes
- Consecration: 27 May 2012 by Menghesteab Tesfamariam

Personal details
- Born: 23 October 1970 (age 55) Addis Ababa, Ethiopia
- Education: Alphonsian Academy

Fikremariam Hagos Tsalim (born 23 October 1970) is an Ethiopian-born Eritrean Catholic hierarch who has served as bishop of the Eparchy of Segheneity since 2012. (Note: Until 2015 not existed separated Eritrean Catholic Church sui iuris, and Eparchies in Eritrea belonged to the Ethiopian Catholic Church sui iuris.) He was imprisoned without trial from 15 October 2022, until his release after 75 days.

== Early life and education ==
Fikremariam Hagos Tsalim was born in Addis Ababa, Ethiopia, on 23 October 1970 to Hagos Tsalim and Birikti Abebe Woldemichael. He was baptized on 21 November by Cardinal Paulos Tzadua. He studied philosophy at the Major Seminary of Adigrat and theology at the Asmara Theological Institute.

== Career ==
Tsalim was ordained a priest on 21 July 1996 by Zekarias Yohannes.

He was a parish priest in Sembel on the outskirts of Asmara while also serving as secretary and bursar of the bishop's residence. He then studied in Rome from February 2000 to January 2003, earning a licentiate in moral theology at the Alphonsian Academy in Rome. He was parish priest of Segheneity and dean of that area. He also became a member of Asmara's ecclesiastical tribunal and vicar general of the Eparchy of Asmara.

On 24 February 2012, Pope Benedict XVI appointed him the first bishop of the newly established Eparchy of Segheneity. He received his episcopal consecration on 27 May from Archbishop Menghesteab Tesfamariam of the Eparchy of Asmara. (Note: The Eparchy of Asmara was raised to the status of Archeparchy on 19 January 2015.)

In May 2014, he and the other Eritrean bishops called on the government to improve economic conditions that were producing mass emigration and to develop economic and judicial systems that respect human dignity. In 2017, he went on his second fundraising tour of the United States to encourage the Eritrean diaspora to maintain contact with their country of origin, its culture and church.

On 19 January 2015, Pope Francis established the Eritrean Catholic Church as a new Metropolitan church sui iuris, separating it from the Ethiopian Catholic Church. Consequently, Tsalim and the Eparchy of Segheneity were transferred from the jurisdiction of the Ethiopian Metropolitanate to the newly formed Eritrean jurisdiction under the Archeparchy of Asmara.

In October 2018, he represented the Eritrean Church at the Synod of Bishops on Young People.

Tsalim joined the other Catholic bishops of Eritrea in a letter calling for greater human rights and religious freedom. Tsalim also criticized the government's military engagement in the Tigray region of northern Ethiopia, which forces young men into military service. On 4 September 2019, he and the Eritrean bishops wrote to the Minister of Public Education to protest the government's takeover of Catholic schools: "If this is not hatred against the faith and religion, what else can it be? By removing children and young people from structures capable of forming them to the supreme values of the fear of God and the moral law, what kind of new generation are we preparing for the future of this country?"

In July 2022, he was named a member of the council of the Catholic University of Eastern Africa.

On 15 October 2022, Tsalim and two other priests were arrested at Asmara International Airport as he was returning from Europe. Tsalim was held at Adi Abeto prison outside of Asmara and the government released no information about legal proceedings or their status, other than confirming that Tsalim was in custody. By late December 2022 that Tsalim and one of the priests had been released, and were welcomed in Asmara cathedral by religious men and women and Archbishop Menghesteab Tesfamariam of Asmara.

== See also ==
- Eritrean Catholic Church
- Religion in Eritrea
