= Tesfamariam Bedho =

Eritrean Catholic bishop (1934–2002)

Most Reverend Tesfamariam Bedho
- Bishop of Keren
- Church: Eritrean Catholic Church
- Archdiocese: Asmara
- Diocese: Keren
- Appointed: 21 December 1995
- Term ended: 29 July 2002
- Predecessor: Eparchy erected
- Successor: Kidane Yebio

Orders
- Ordination: 19 December 1965 by François Abraha
- Consecration: 4 February 1996 by Paulos Tzadua, Zekarias Yohannes and Kidane-Mariam Teklehaimanot

Personal details
- Born: 12 September 1934 Deroq, Italian Eritrea (now Eritrea)
- Died: 29 July 2002 (aged 67) Asmara, Eritrea
- Education: Pontifical Urban University

Tesfamariam Bedho (12 September 1934 – 29 July 2002) was an Eritrean hierarch of the Ethiopian Catholic Church, (Note: Until 2015 not existed separated Eritrean Catholic Church sui iuris, and Eparchies in Eritrea belonged to the Ethiopian Catholic Church sui iuris.) who served as the first Bishop of the Eparchy of Keren from its establishment in 1995 until his death in 2002.

== Early life, education and priesthood ==
Tesfamariam Bedho was born on 12 September 1934 in Deroq, present day in Anseba region, Eritrea. He began his formation to the priesthood at a young age, entering the Keren Seminary for his early ecclesiastical studies. He later moved to Asmara, where he attended the Major Seminary to complete his theological and philosophical training. Following his local studies, he was sent to Rome, Italy, where he studied at the Pontifical Urban University, obtaining further academic qualifications in preparation for his ministry.

Bedho was ordained to the priesthood on 19 December 1965 for the Eparchy of Asmara by Bishop François Abraha. Following his ordination, he served in various pastoral and administrative roles within the Eparchy of Asmara, which at the time encompassed much of the region.

== Episcopacy ==
On 21 December 1995, with the establishment of the Eparchy of Keren (detached from the Eparchy of Asmara), Bedho was appointed its first bishop by Pope John Paul II. He received his episcopal consecration on 4 February 1996 from Cardinal Paulos Tzadua, assisted by Zekarias Yohannes and Kidane-Mariam Teklehaimanot.

He was among the Eritrean bishops who issued a joint appeal in May 2000, calling on the international community to help broker an immediate ceasefire. In October 2001, he participated in the Synod of Bishops in Rome. During the assembly, he addressed the challenges facing the Church in Eritrea, specifically mentioning the difficulties of carrying out pastoral work amidst regional instability.

== Death ==
Bedho suddenly died in office on 29 July 2002 at the age of 67, following his visit of the Inter-Eparchial Major Seminary in Asmera.
