= Thomas Osman =

Eritrean Catholic hierarch (born 1950)

Most Reverend Thomas Osman, OFM Cap.
- Eparch of Barentu
- Church: Eritrean Catholic Church
- Province: Asmara
- Diocese: Barentu
- Appointed: 4 October 2001
- Predecessor: Luca Milesi

Orders
- Ordination: 10 July 1977
- Consecration: 13 January 2002 by Zekarias Yohannes, Luca Milesi, Tesfamariam Bedho

Personal details
- Born: 25 May 1950 (age 76) Lemuna, Eritrean British Military Administration (now Eritrea)

Thomas Osman OFM Cap. (born 25 May 1950) is an Eritrean Catholic hierarch and a member of the Order of Friars Minor Capuchin. Since 2001, he has served as the Eparchial Bishop of the Eparchy of Barentu. Until 2015 he belonged to the Ethiopian Catholic Church. (Note: Until 2015 not existed separated Eritrean Catholic Church sui iuris, and Eparchies in Eritrea belonged to the Ethiopian Catholic Church sui iuris.)

== Early life and ministry ==
Thomas Osman was born in Lemuna, now in Gash-Barka region, Eritrea. After completing his primary and secondary education in his home country, he entered the Capuchin Order. He pursued his philosophical and theological studies at the St. Francis Capuchin Institute in Addis Ababa, Ethiopia. He made his perpetual profession in the Order of Friars Minor Capuchin on 19 July 1976 and was ordained to the priesthood on 10 July 1977.

Following his ordination, Osman held several pastoral and administrative positions. He served as the parish priest of the Sacred Heart parish in Asmara and later as the superior of the Capuchin friary in Keren. He also served as a member of the Provincial Council of the Capuchins in Eritrea and was later appointed as the Provincial Vicar. Before his episcopal appointment, he served as the Protosyncellus of the Eparchy of Barentu since 1996 until 2001.

== Episcopal ministry ==
On 4 October 2001, Pope John Paul II appointed Osman as the Eparch of Barentu, succeeding Luca Milesi. He received his episcopal consecration on 13 January 2002 from Zekarias Yohannes, Bishop emeritus of Asmara, assisted by Luca Milesi and Tesfamariam Bedho.

On 19 January 2015, Pope Francis established the Eritrean Catholic Church as a new Metropolitan church sui iuris, separating it from the Ethiopian Catholic Church. Consequently, Osman and the Eparchy of Barentu were transferred from the jurisdiction of the Ethiopian Metropolitanate to the newly formed Eritrean jurisdiction under the Archeparchy of Asmara.

As a hierarch of the Eritrean Catholic Church, Osman has been vocal about the socio-political challenges facing the country. In 2010, during the Special Assembly for the Middle East of the Synod of Bishops, he highlighted the difficulties faced by the Catholic minority in Eritrea and the importance of interreligious dialogue.

Under his leadership, the Eparchy of Barentu has faced significant pressure from the Eritrean government. In 2019, he was among the signatories of a pastoral letter decrying the seizure of Catholic-run schools and clinics by the state, which the bishops described as a violation of religious freedom.
