= Ethiopic Church =

Ethiopic Church refers to a Christian church whose traditional liturgy is in the Ge'ez language, also known as Ethiopic.

There are four such churches:

- Ethiopian Orthodox Tewahedo Church
- Eritrean Orthodox Tewahedo Church
- Ethiopian Catholic Church
- Eritrean Catholic Church
