= St. Anthony Cathedral, Endibir =

St. Anthony Cathedral
- ሳን አንቶኒዮ ካቴድራል
- St. Anthony Cathedral
- Location: Endibir, Central Ethiopia Regional State
- Country: Ethiopia
- Denomination: Ethiopian Catholic Church (Alexandrian Rite)

Architecture
- Architectural type: church

St. Anthony Cathedral, (Amharic: ሳን አንቶኒዮ ካቴድራል) also known as the Ethiopian Catholic Cathedral of Emdibir, is a cathedral of the Ethiopian Catholic Church located in Emdibir, Ethiopia. It follows the Alexandrian Rite.

The cathedral is the main church of the Ethiopian Catholic Eparchy of Emdeber (Eparchia Emdeberensis), which was created in 2003 by the bull "Ad universae incrementum" of Pope John Paul II with territory of the Ethiopian Catholic Archaeparchy of Addis Ababa.

It was under the pastoral responsibility of Bishop Musie Ghebreghiorghis.

== See also ==
- Cathedral of the Holy Saviour, Adigrat
- Holy Trinity Cathedral, Sodo
- Roman Catholicism in Ethiopia
