= Kidane Mehret Cathedral =

Catholic church in Asmara, Eritrea

Cathedral of Our Lady of Perpetual Help
- ኪዳነ ምሕረት; Kidane Mehret Church
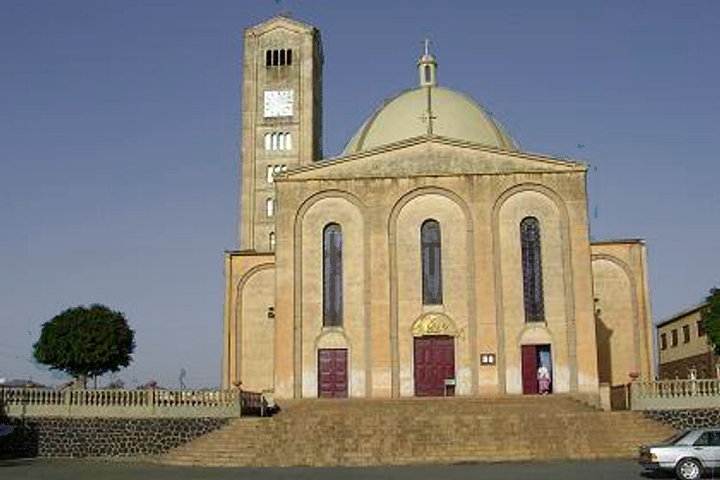
- The front view of the church

- Location within Eritrea
- 15.340913799628733°N 38.9370095556472°E
- Location: Asmara, Ma'ekel
- Country: Eritrea
- Denomination: Alexandrian Rite of Eritrean Catholic Church

History
- Dedication: Our Lady of Perpetual Help
- Dedicated: 16 Yekatit

Architecture
- Functional status: active
- Groundbreaking: 1920s
- Completed: 1969

Administration
- Diocese: Archeparchy of Asmara

Clergy
- Archbishop: Menghesteab Tesfamariam, M.C.C.I.

Kidane Mehret Cathedral (Italian: Cattedrale Kidane Mehret, Our Lady of Perpetual Help Cathedral) is a Catholic church located on Adi Quala Street, Asmara, Eritrea. The cathedral belongs to Eritrean Catholic Archeparchy of Asmara.

== Kidane Mehret ==
Kidane Mehret (ኪዳነ ምሕረት) is a Ge'ez phrase meaning Covenant of Mercy. It refers to the Ethiopic tradition that Jesus promised his mother that he would forgive the sins of those who sought her intercession. Archdiocesan website stated that Kidane Mehret also can be translated as Our Lady of Perpetual Help.

The feast of Our Lady of the Covenant of Mercy is celebrated on 16 Yekatit (Ethiopian calendar), corresponding at present to 24 February (Gregorian calendar) except in leap years, when it corresponds to 25 February, since in the Ethiopian calendar the extra day is inserted in what for the Gregorian calendar is the preceding month of September.

== History ==
In the centre of the capital of Italian Eritrea the Latin Church Catholics had what was known as the "Asmara Catholic Cathedral" (the Church of Our Lady of the Rosary, Asmara) as their principal church, which was completed in 1923. In the northwestern corner of the city, a place of worship was granted to the Alexandrian Rite Catholic community, who preceded the arrival of the Italians. In 1930, they were given their own ordinariate, independent of the Apostolic Vicariate of Eritrea.

Father Kidanè-Maryam Cassà, who since 1926 had been their pro-vicar within the Vicariate, was appointed their ordinary and on 3 August 1930 was ordained titular bishop of Thibaris in the chapel of the Pontifical Ethiopian College in Vatican City. At that time they numbered less than 3% of the population of Eritrea.

The first building on the site was a small church constructed with the "monkey-head" technique, as used also in the ancient church of Kidane Mehret, with which this Catholic church is not to be confused: "The supporting walls incorporate wooden beams that protrude from the exterior of the walls; they look like rows of monkey scalps.".

Father Kidane-Maryam Cassa obtained from the Italian colonial governor the initial improvement of the small church in the late 1930s.

When on 31 October 1951 the Alexandrian-Rite community were given the rank of an Apostolic Exarchate and a cathedral had to be assigned to it, this building was given the rights and privileges of a cathedral but, being too small to be given that title, it was referred to as the pro-cathedral.

A building more worthy of being called the cathedral was completed in 1969. It is of much greater size and is noted for its strikingly large dome.

== Present day ==
With the suppression on 21 December 1995 of the Apostolic Vicariate of Eritrea, Kidane Mehret became the only Catholic church in Asmara that has a right to the title of cathedral. However, what had been the principal church of the Apostolic Vicariate ( the "Church of Our Lady of the Rosary") is still in Asmara commonly called "the Cathedral".

== See also ==
- Kidane Mehret Church, Jerusalem
