= Lukas Teshome Fikre Woldetensae =

Ethiopian Catholic bishop (born 1972)

Most Reverend Lukas Teshome Fikre Woldetensae
- Bishop of Emdeber
- Church: Ethiopian Catholic Church
- Province: Addis Ababa
- Diocese: Emdeber
- Installed: 23 August 2024
- Predecessor: Musie Ghebreghiorghis
- Other post: Secretary General of the Catholic Bishops' Conference of Ethiopia (since 2019)
- Previous post: Coadjutor Bishop of Emdeber (2023–2024)

Orders
- Ordination: 11 January 1998
- Consecration: 11 February 2024 by Berhaneyesus Demerew Souraphiel

Personal details
- Born: Teshome Fikre Woldetensae; 6 June 1972 (age 54) Gurage Zone, Ethiopia
- Education: Pontifical Lateran University

Lukas Teshome Fikre Woldetensae (born 6 June 1972) is an Ethiopian Catholic hierarch, who has served as the eparchial bishop of the Eparchy of Emdeber since August 2024. He previously served as the coadjutor bishop of the same see and as the secretary general of the Catholic Bishops' Conference of Ethiopia (CBCE).

== Biography ==
Lukas Teshome Fikre Woldetensae was born on 6 June 1972 in Gurage Zone. He studied philosophy and theology at the St. Francis Institute of Philosophy and Theology in Addis Ababa. He was ordained a priest for the Archeparchy of Addis Ababa on 11 January 1998 and lated was incardinated in the newly created Eparchy of Emebeder on 23 November 2003.

Following his ordination, he served in various pastoral roles before pursuing further studies in Rome at the Pontifical Oriental Institute, where he earned a doctorate in Eastern canon law. Upon his return to Ethiopia, he served as a professor at his alma mater and held several administrative positions within the archeparchy. In 2019 he became the secretary general of the Catholic Bishops' Conference of Ethiopia (CBCE), a role in which he coordinated national ecclesiastical activities and represented the Church in various social and governmental forums.

On 16 December 2023, Pope Francis appointed him as the coadjutor bishop of the Eparchy of Emdeber. He received his episcopal consecration on 11 February 2024 from Cardinal Berhaneyesus Demerew Souraphiel, the metropolitan archbishop of Addis Ababa, at the Cathedral of St. Anthony in Emdeber.

Upon the retirement of Bishop Musie Ghebreghiorghis on 23 August 2024, Bishop Lukas automatically succeeded him as the second bishop of Emdeber.

In December 2025 he was named permanent secretary of the Ethiopian Catholic Bishops’ Conference after its Ordinary General Assembly.
