= Luca Milesi =

Luca Milesi may refer to:

- Luca Milesi (bishop) (1924–2008), Italian-born Eritrean Catholic bishop
- Luca Milesi (footballer) (born 1993), Italian football player
