= Milesi =

Milesi is an Italian surname. Notable people with the surname include:

- Alessandro Milesi (painter) (1856–1945), Italian painter
- Alessandro Milesi (footballer) (born 1999), Peruvian footballer
- Davide Milesi (born 1964), Italian runner
- Giuseppe Milesi Pironi Ferretti (1817–1873), Italian Roman Catholic cardinal
- Lorenzo Milesi (born 2002), Italian cyclist
- Luca Milesi (bishop) (1924–2008), Italian-born Eritrean Catholic bishop
- Luca Milesi (footballer) (born 1993), Italian football player
- Marco Milesi (born 1970), Italian racing cyclist
- Piero Milesi (1953–2011), Italian musician
