= St. Michael's Cathedral, Keren =

St. Michael's Cathedral
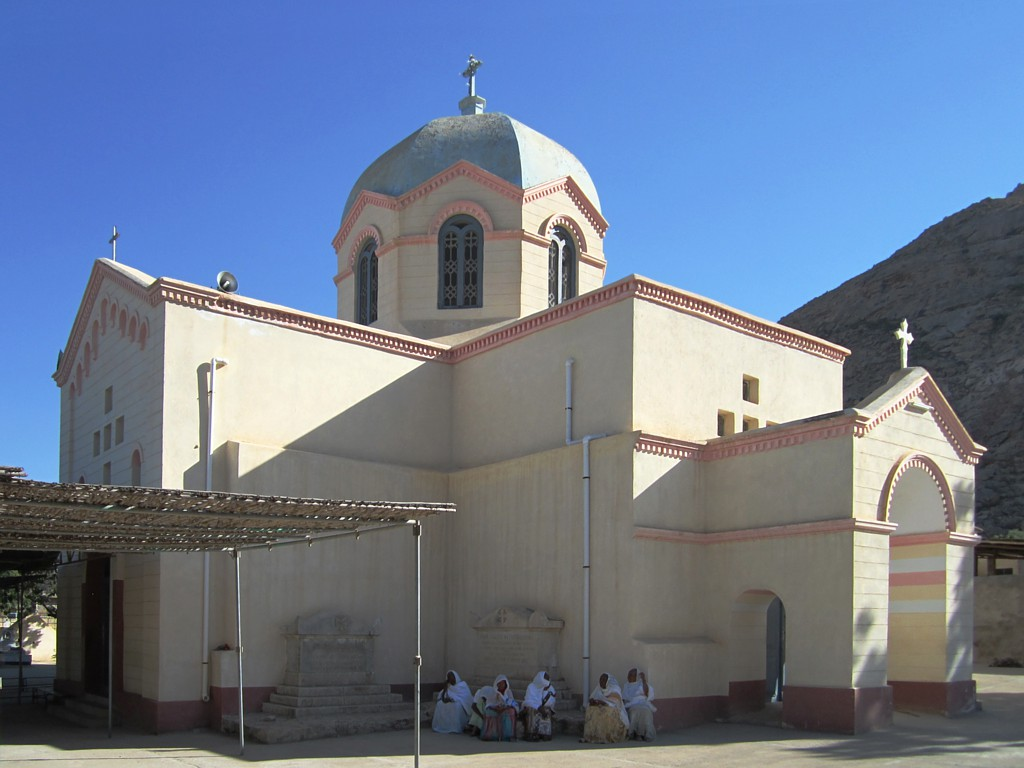
- St. Michael's Cathedral
- Location: Keren
- Country: Eritrea
- Denomination: Catholic Church

History
- Status: cathedral

Architecture
- Architectural type: church

St. Michael's Cathedral is a Catholic cathedral located in Keren, Anseba, Eritrea, the seat of the Eritrean Catholic Eparchy of Keren.

== The 1875 church rebuilt in 1925 ==
The first Catholic church in Keren was constructed in the western outskirts of the town in 1865, but was demolished in 1871 by Ethiopian forces. When Egyptian forces under Werner Munzinger occupied Keren and Bogos in 1872, the authorities permitted the Catholics to rebuild St. Michael's Church. During the 1870s, Egypt controlled much of what is now northern Eritrea. The Apostolic Vicariate of Abyssinia, which had its headquarters in Keren from 1870 to 1894, began reconstruction on 24 May 1873. The completed church was blessed on 14 February 1875.

Rebuilt in 1925, the church is cruciform with a central dome.

This church became the cathedral of the Eritrean Catholic Eparchy of Keren, when this was set up by Pope John Paul II on 21 December 1995.

Since the beginning, following the practice set by Saint Justin de Jacobis, the liturgy is celebrated in the Ge'ez variant of the Alexandrian rite.

== New cathedral ==
In 1965 the foundation stone was laid for a much larger new cathedral of Saint Michael to replace that of 1875/1925. 1961–1991 were the years of the Eritrean War of Independence and only in the 21st century did construction begin in earnest. It was not yet completed in January 2017.

The new building is situated in the south of the town (coordinates: 15.774931 N, 38.448618 E).

With projections for the sanctuary and three entrances, it is octagonal in shape, as in many churches of Ethiopic tradition.

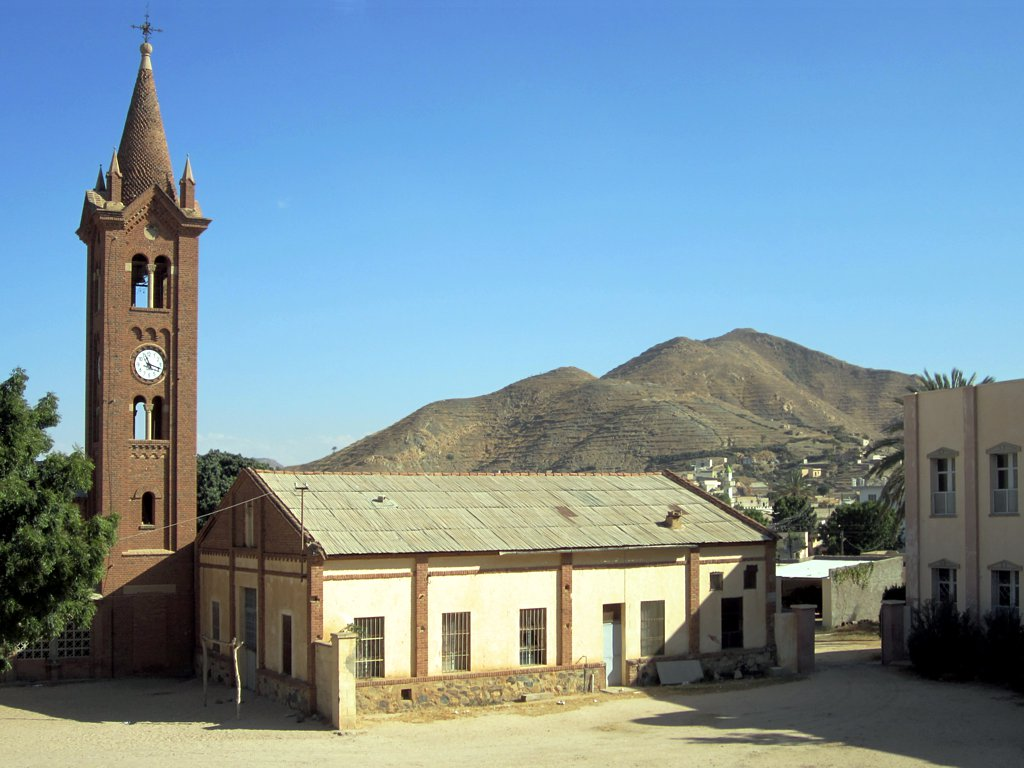
Old church of Saint Anthony in Keren

== Other churches in Keren ==
In the centre of the town of Keren, the Church of Saint Anthony exists, like the cathedral, in two versions, but these two versions are close to each other. The old church was consecrated on 12 June 1932.

The coordinates of the new Church of Saint Anthony are 15.779711 N, 38.454835 E.

== See also ==
- Eritrean Catholic Church
- Eritrean Catholic Eparchy of Keren
