= Ethiopian Catholic Eparchy of Emdeber =

Eparchy (Eastern Catholic diocese) of the Ethiopian Catholic Church

Coordinates: 8°07′N 37°56′E

Eparchy of Emdeber Eparchia Emdeberensis

Location
- Country: Ethiopia
- Ecclesiastical province: Addis Ababa

Statistics
- Area: 9,176 km^{2} (3,543 sq mi)
- Population: Total; Catholics: (as of 2004); 6,000,000; 24,000 (0.4%)

Information
- Denomination: Ethiopian Catholic Church
- Rite: Alexandrian Rite
- Established: 25 November 2003 (22 years ago)
- Cathedral: St. Anthony Cathedral

Current leadership
- Bishop: Lukas Teshome Fikre Woldetensae
- Metropolitan Archbishop: Berhaneyesus Demerew Souraphiel
- Bishops emeritus: Musie Ghebreghiorghis, OFM Cap

Map
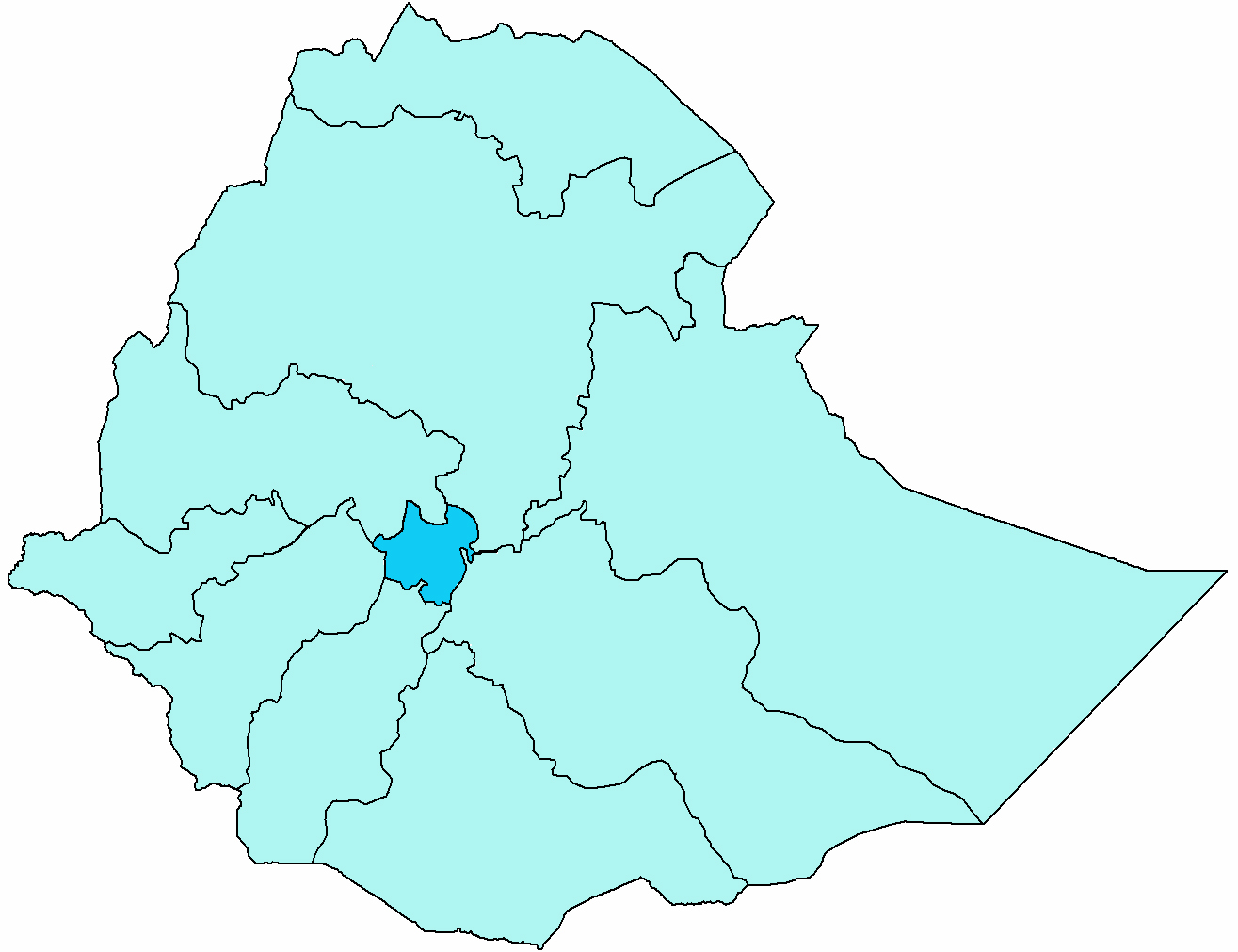

The Ethiopian Catholic Eparchy of Emdeber (Latin: Emdeberen(sis)) is an eparchy (Eastern Catholic diocese) of the Ethiopian Catholic Church, a metropolitan Eastern Catholic Church. It is a suffragan of the Ethiopian Catholic Archeparchy of Addis Ababa.

It is named after the town of Emdibir, where it has its cathedral, St. Anthony Cathedral, Endibir.

Its name, like that of the town, is transliterated in different ways: Eparchy of Emdibir, Endibir, Endeber and Indibir.

== History ==
- 25 November 2003: Established as Eparchy of Emdeber with territory taken from the Metropolitan Archeparchy of Addis Ababa.

== Eparchial Bishops ==
(Ethiopian rite) Eparchs of Emdeber

- Musie Ghebreghiorghis, O.F.M. Cap. (25 November 2003 – 23 August 2024)
- Lukas Teshome Fikre Woldetensae (since 23 August 2024)

=== Coadjutor Bishop ===
- Lukas Teshome Fikre Woldetensae (16 December 2023 – 23 August 2024)

== The Eparchy ==
Emdibir Eparchy was established in late November 2003, becoming the third eparchy within Ethiopia of the Ethiopian Catholic Church. Its setting up followed long years of Catholic presence and service in the area.

Located southwest of Addis Ababa, the capital of Ethiopia, the eparchy covers the Guraghe Zone of the Southern Nations, Nationalities, and Peoples' Regional State (SNNPRS) and part of South–Western Shoa Zone of Oromiya Regional State. It is bordered to the northwest by the Western Shoa Zone of Oromiya Regional State, to the south by the Hadiya and the Kembata Timbaro Zones of SNNPRS, to the east by Silte Zone of SNNPRS, and to the west by the Gibe River. The total land area of the eparchy is about 12,000 square kilometers with an estimated population of 4 million. The major ethnic groups are the Guraghe and the Oromo, with a variety of minority ethnic communities.

== Emdibir Catholic Secretariat (EmCS) ==
Emdibir Catholic Secretariat (EmCS) was established in April 2004 with the mandate to coordinate and facilitate all pastoral, social and development activities of the Catholic Church in the Eparchy of Emdibir. The overall goal and objective of EmCS is promoting “Human Integral Development” which implies the development of people both materially and spiritually.

The Secretariat has two main wings/departments. One is the Pastoral Activities Co-Coordinating wing, which deals with pastoral activities of the Church in general. The other wing is the Social and Development Coordination wing, which mainly deals with the socio-economic and development promotion activities of the Church within the jurisdiction of the Eparchy. The Secretariat Office is now well equipped by qualified professional personnel to discharge its duties and responsibilities in pastoral activities and promoting socio-economic development activities of the Church for the communities/societies in the Eparchy.

== See also ==
- Catholic dioceses in Ethiopia
- Roman Catholicism in Ethiopia
- Apostolic Prefecture of Endeber

== Sources and external links ==
- GCatholic.org
- Catholic Hierarchy
- Ethiopian Catholic Secretariat
