= Church of Our Lady of the Rosary, Asmara =

Catholic church in Eritrea

Our Lady of the Rosary
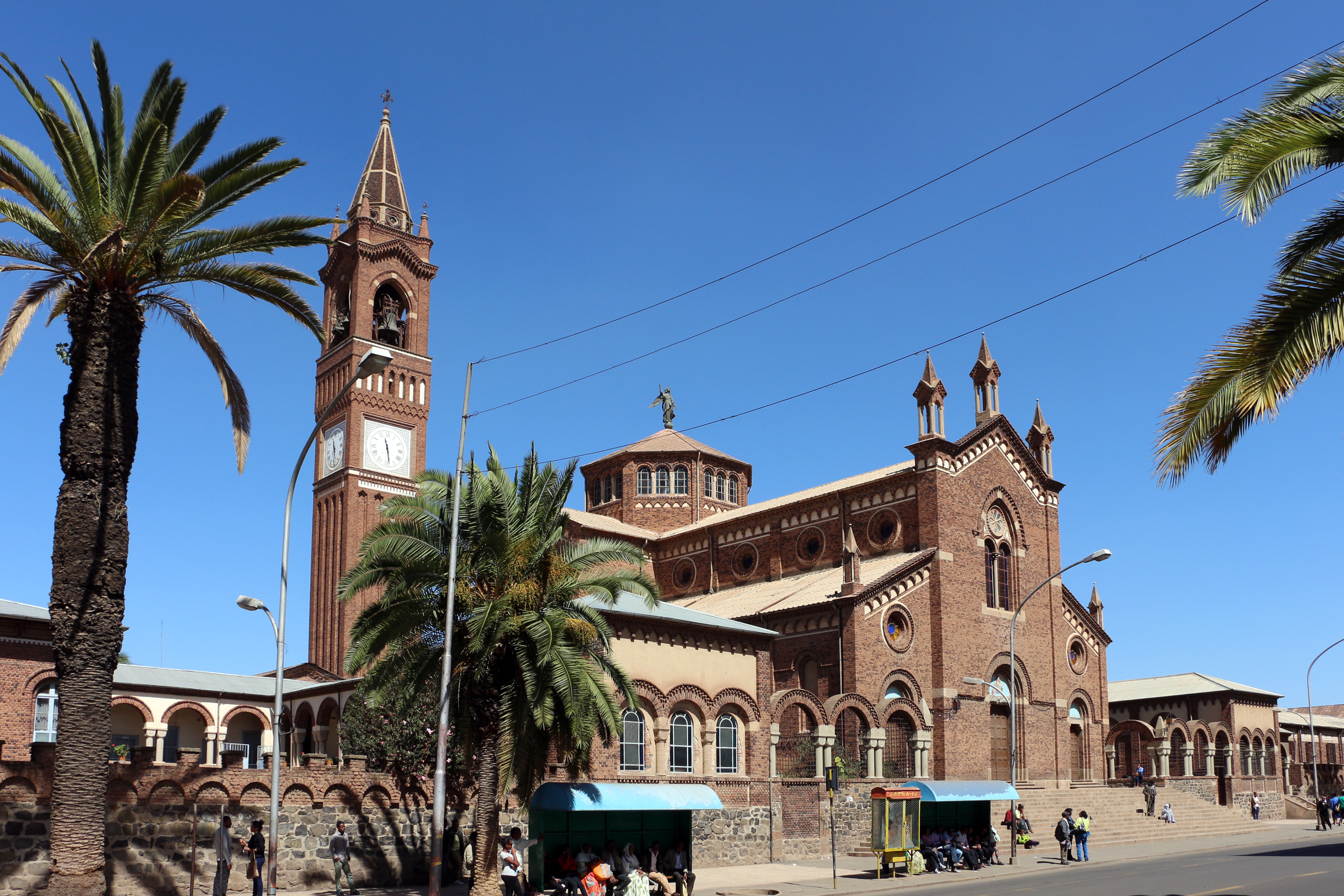

Religion
- Affiliation: Roman Catholic
- Diocese: Apostolic Vicariate of Eritrea (1923-1995), Eritrean Catholic Archeparchy of Asmara (1995-present)
- Rite: Roman
- Year consecrated: 1923

Location
- Location: Asmara, Eritrea
- Interactive map of Our Lady of the Rosary
- Coordinates: 15°20′12″N 38°56′16″E

Architecture
- Architect: Oreste Scanavini
- Type: church
- Style: Lombard Romanesque; Gothic architecture (freestanding bell tower)
- Groundbreaking: 1921
- Completed: 1923

The Church of Our Lady of the Rosary, Asmara (Italian: Chiesa della Beata Vergine del Rosario) is a Catholic church built in the early 1920s in Asmara, when the city was the capital of Italian Eritrea. Often called "The Cathedral", it is a large Lombard Romanesque style church in the centre of the city, built in 1923 to serve as the principal church of the Apostolic Vicariate of Eritrea.

The church was never the seat of a diocesan bishop and thus was not a cathedral in the strict sense. It was the principal church of an apostolic vicariate, an ecclesiastical jurisdiction headed by a titular bishop. In the late 1930s and early 1940s, a time of great immigration of Italians into the then colony of Eritrea, this apostolic vicariate, which since 1930 was exclusively of the Latin Church, happened to have more faithful than the Ordinariate for the Ethiopic Rite Catholics in the country; but after the Second World War the number of Italians in Eritrea went into steep decline. When the fourth titular bishop who acted as Apostolic Vicar at Asmara resigned in 1971, no successor was appointed and the vicariate was administered by a priest instead of a bishop, until it was finally suppressed in 1995.

The church is now a parish church belonging to the Eritrean Catholic Archeparchy of Asmara, whose cathedral is the Kidane Mehret Church, Asmara. Nevertheless, in Asmara the church is still commonly called the cathedral.

== History ==
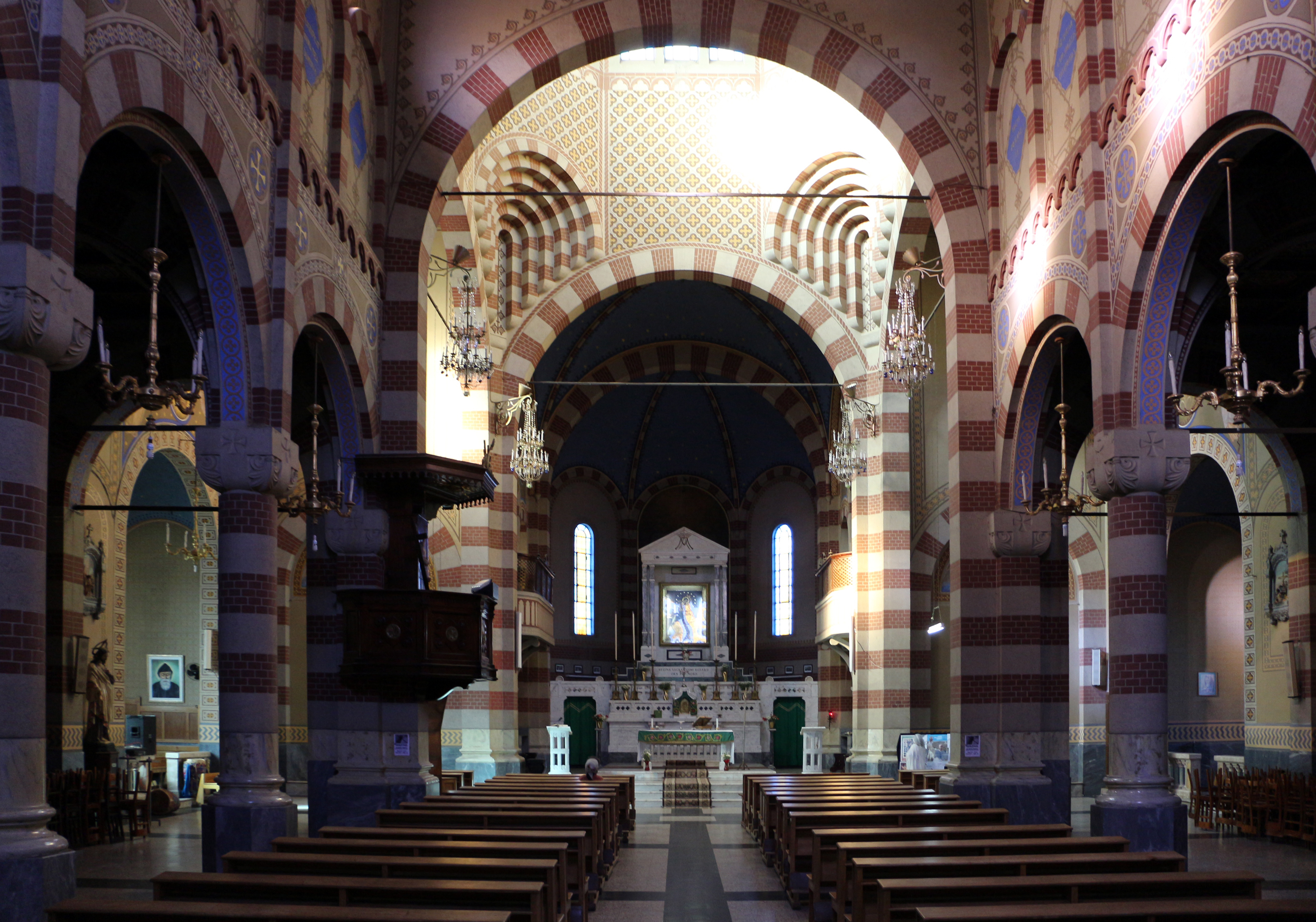
Interior of Asmara Cathedral.

The cathedral was created by the Italian government, initially to serve mainly the growing community of Italians in Eritrea who needed a huge catholic center in the 1920s.

The building in the Lombard Romanesque style was designed by the Milanese architect Oreste Scanavini and work on it was supervised by Mario Mazzetti from Montese in the Italian province of Modena.

Construction began in June 1921 and was completed in September 1923. The church was consecrated on 14 October 1923.

It is dedicated to Our Lady of the Rosary.

The church is in the form of a nave and two aisles with a transept and three apses. It is 40 metres long, 27 metres wide and has a height of 25 metres to the lantern, which is surmounted by a bronze statue of the archangel Gabriel, also interpreted, in spite of the absence of the weaponry with which that archangel is usually represented, as Michael.

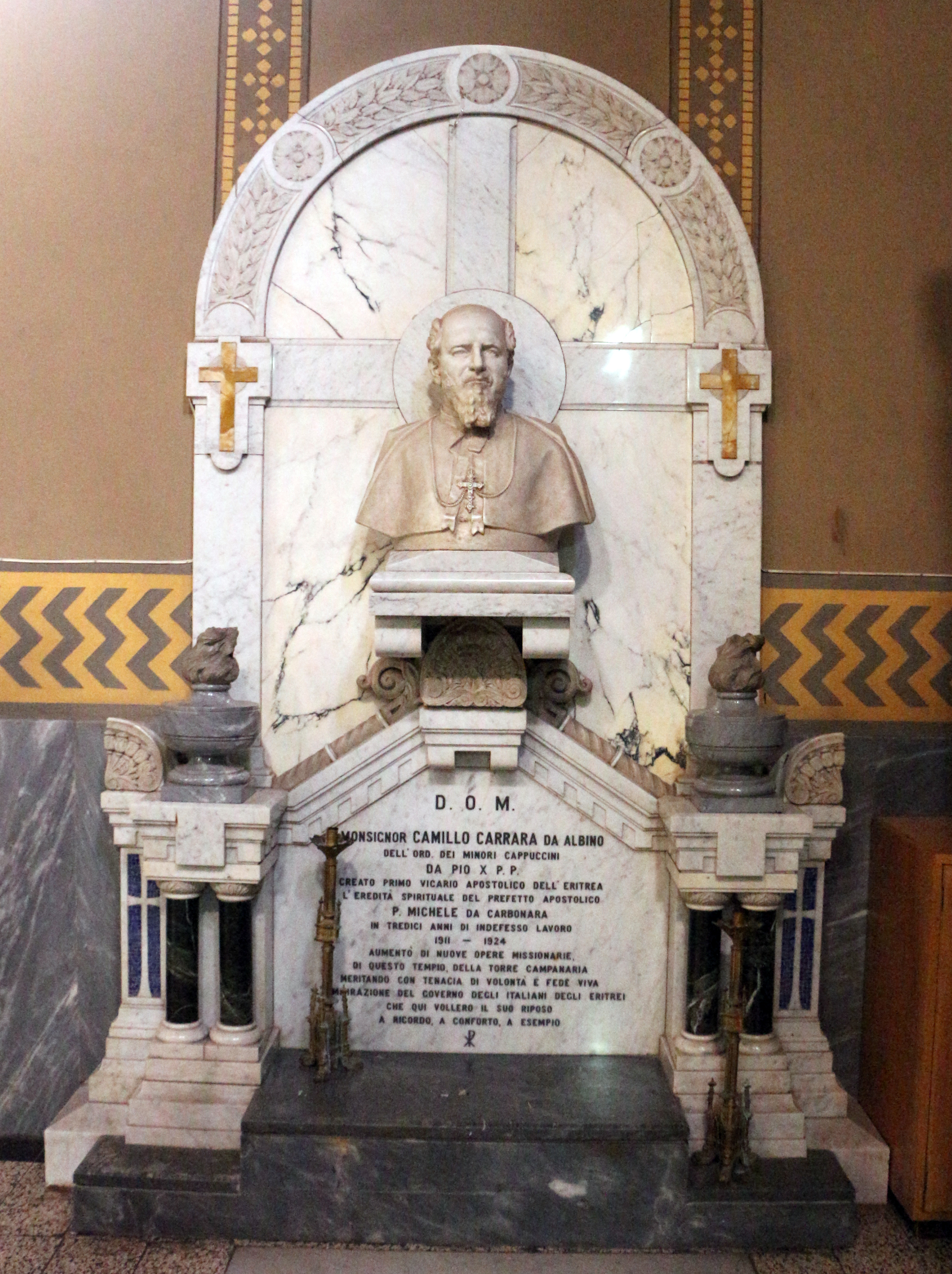
Tomb of Bishop Camillo Francesco Carrara

The main initiative for building the great church came from Camillo Francesco Carrara, O.F.M.Cap., titular bishop of Agathopolis, who was the first Apostolic Vicar of Eritrea.

A large inscription in the church honours the principal donors who contributed to the cost of the building. They include Benito Mussolini and other leading figures in Italian political life. The painting by Carlo Maratta (1625–1713) behind the high altar, representing the Assumption of Mary, was a gift from King Victor Emmanuel III of Italy.

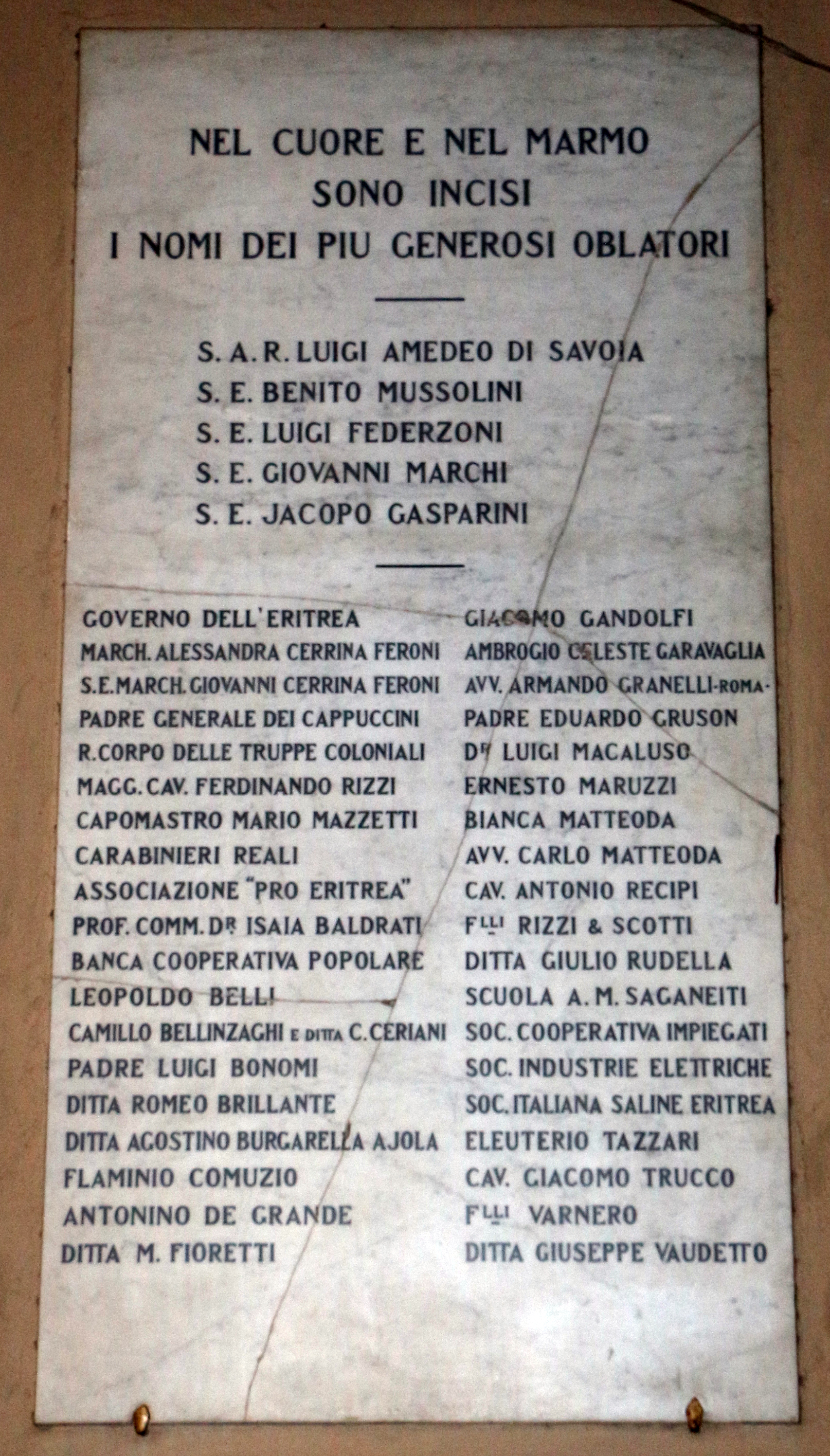
Inscription honouring the chief donors

Work on the freestanding 52-metre high bell tower began later and was completed in 1925 after the death (on 15 June 1924) of Bishop Carrara.

It contains eight bells (an octave from A to A) cast from Austro-Hungarian guns captured in the First World War. The largest weighs 3.8 tons.

The church was partially damaged during WW2, but it was quickly repaired in the following years thanks mainly to the contributions of the Italians living in Asmara.

An electronic clock was installed in 1987.
