= Vicariate Apostolic of Asmara =

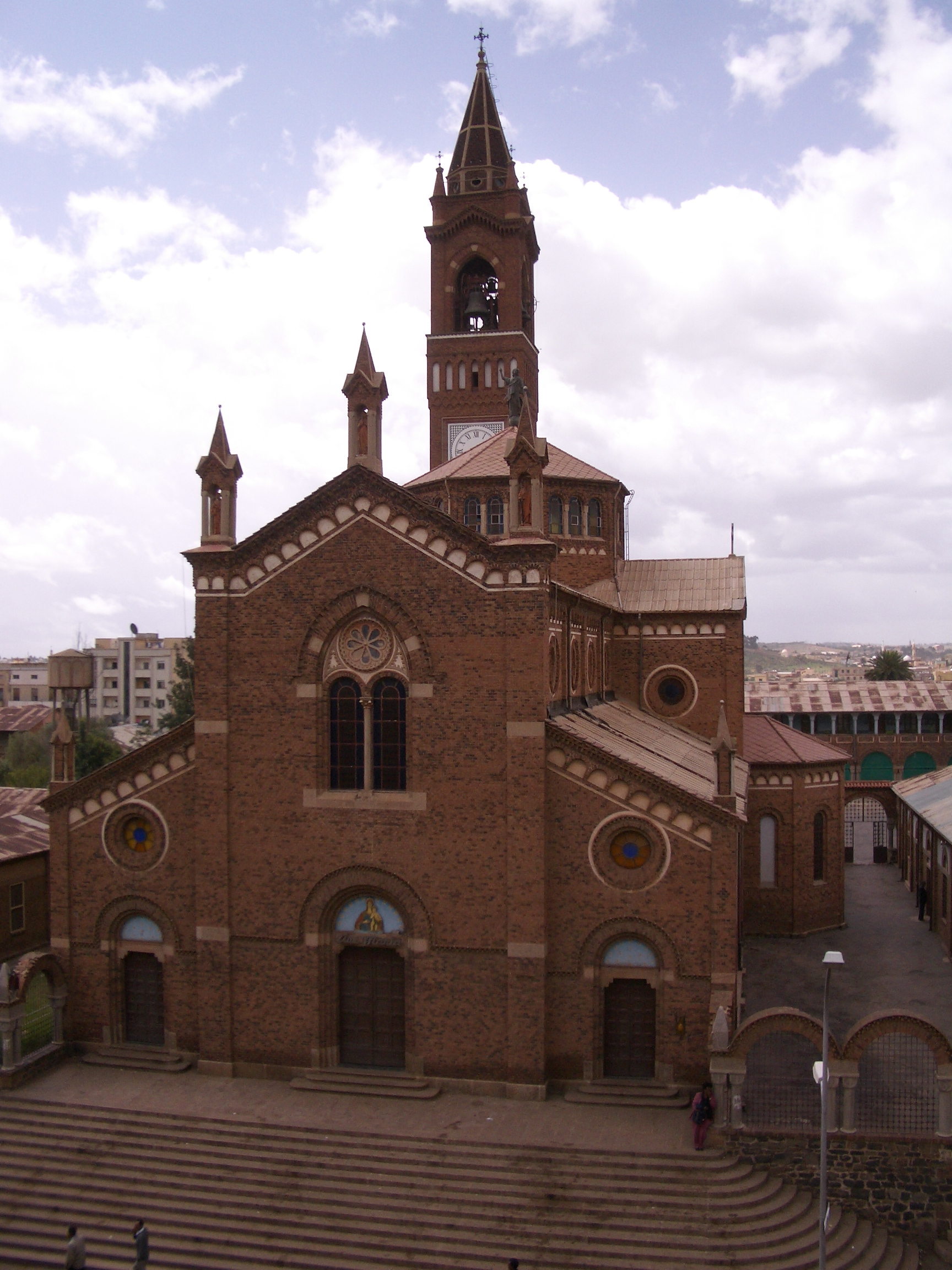
Church of Our Lady of the Rosary, the principal church of the Apostolic Vicariate of Asmara

The Apostolic Vicariate of Asmara was a Roman Catholic missionary jurisdiction in Eritrea. Centered in Asmara it was at first the Apostolic Prefecture of Eritrea and then the Apostolic Vicariate of Eritrea.

== Foundation and development ==
On 13 September 1894, the Holy See established the Apostolic Prefecture of Eritrea, then an Italian colony, with the decree Ut saluti animarum of the Congregation for the Propagation of the Faith. Its territory was taken from that of the Apostolic Vicariate of Abyssinia, which at that time had its headquarters in Keren, Eritrea, a town that became the first seat of the new Apostolic Prefecture of Eritrea. On 7 February 1911, it was promoted to Apostolic Vicariate (with a titular bishop as ordinary).

The Apostolic Vicariate of Abyssinia was entrusted to missionaries of the Congregation of the Mission, who followed the lead of Saint Giustino de Jacobis, the founder of the mission, by using in the liturgy the local Ethiopic variant of the Alexandrian Rite in the Ge'ez language, not the Roman Rite in Latin. They were mainly French and, after Eritrea was declared an Italian colony in 1890, were expelled by the colonial authorities, who accused them of fomenting armed resistance. The Apostolic Prefecture of Eritrea was created for the Italian Capuchins, who replaced them. These promoted use of the Roman Rite, in view also of the arrival of Italian immigrants. Discontent among the Eritrean Catholics led to the sending in 1927 of the future cardinal Alexis Lépicier as an Apostolic Visitor to examine the situation. As a result, Father Kidanè-Maryam Cassà was appointed at first Pro-Vicar Apostolic for the Ethiopic-Rite Catholics and then, on 4 July 1930, bishop in charge of an independent Ordinariate of Eritrea. The Eritrean Catholic Church is the continuation of this ordinariate and of the first Eritrean Catholic community.

The influx of Italians into Eritrea, especially in the 1930s, led to rapid expansion of the Vicariate, although it had thus in 1930 ceased to have responsibility for Ethiopic-Rite Catholics.

On 25 July 1959, when already in steep decline, it was renamed as the Apostolic Vicariate of Asmara, the capital of Eritrea.

== Decline and suppression ==
Although at the beginning of the 1940s nearly 28% of the population of Italian Eritrea were Catholics, mostly Italians and of the Latin Church, there was a pronounced fall in the number of Italians present after the end of the Second World War, when Eritrea was at first under British military administration. The British census of 1949 showed that Asmara, the capital, had only 17,183 Italians out of a total population of 127,579. The departure of Italians accelerated further when Eritrea came under Ethiopian authority at the end of 1950. The Vicariate, which previously had under its jurisdiction the great majority of the Catholics in Eritrea, became less important numerically than the growing ordinariate, which on 31 October 1951 was raised to the level of an exarchate (the Eastern equivalent of a Vicariate) under the name of the Apostolic Exarchate of Asmara, and on 28 February 1961 became an eparchy, the Eastern equivalent of a diocese.

When the fourth and last bishop who held the post of Vicar Apostolic of Eritrea or Asmara retired on 2 June 1974, no successor was appointed and the administration of the Vicariate was entrusted to a Capuchin priest.

On 21 December 1995, after a quarter of a century of being without a bishop and being administered by a priest, the Vicariate was suppressed at the same time as two new eparchies of the Ethiopian Catholic Church were formed from territory taken from the Eparchy of Asmara: Barentu and Keren (now suffragans of the Archeparchy of Asmara). With the suppression of the Vicariate, Eritrea was left with no Latin Church ordinary, and all Catholics in Eritrea were entrusted to the care of Eastern Catholic bishops, who since 19 January 2015 are hierarchs of the Eritrean Catholic Church.

The former importance of the Latin Vicariate is reflected in the impressive church dedicated to Our Lady of the Rosary that was completed in 1923 as the principal church of the Apostolic Vicariate. Even after the demise of the Vicariate in 1995, it is still called "the cathedral".

== Ordinaries ==
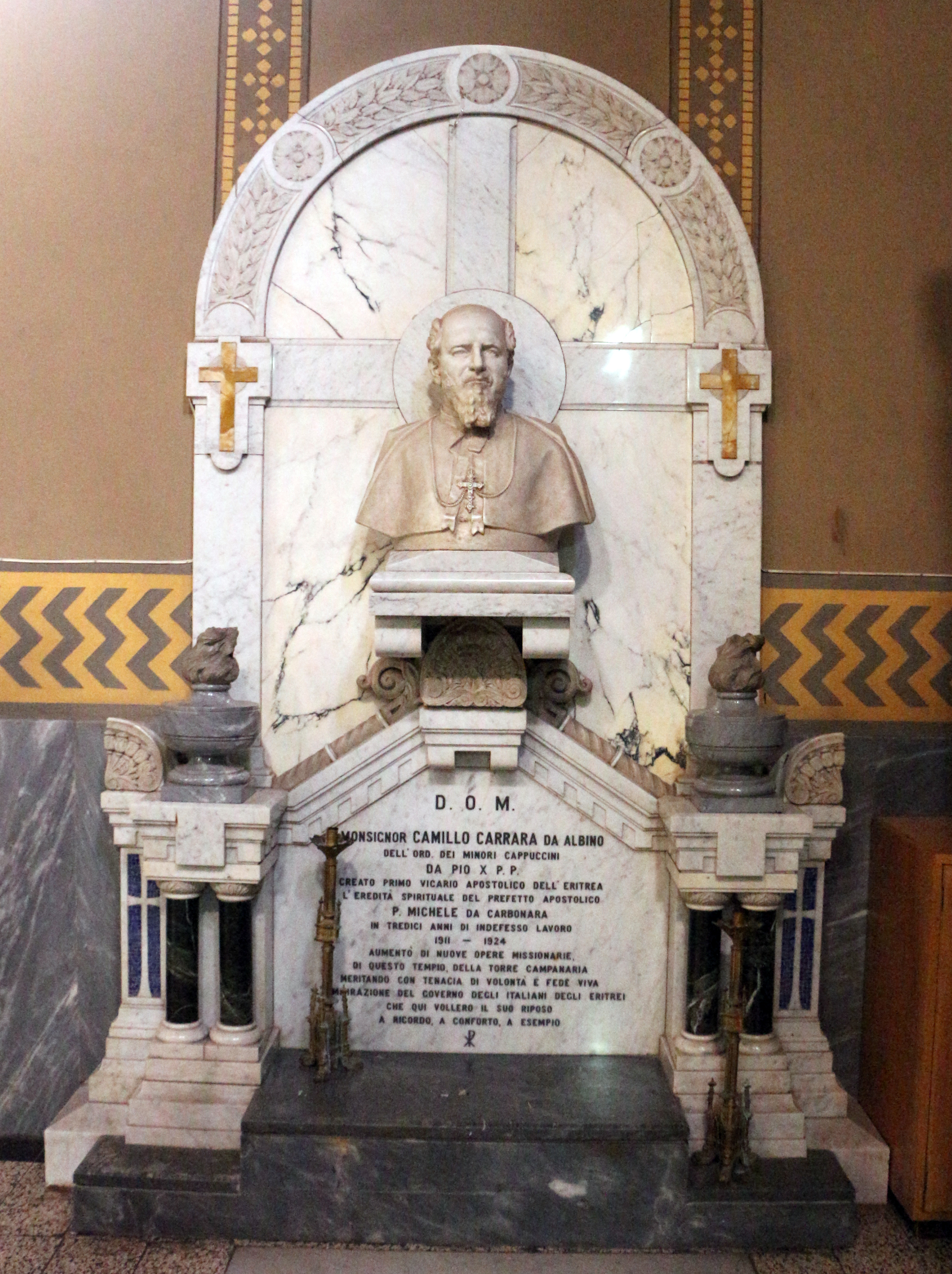
Bust of Bishop Camillo Carrara, the first Vicar Apostolic of Eritrea

All ordinaries of the Vicariate were missionary members of the Latin Catholic religious order of the Capuchin Franciscans
Prefects Apostolic of Eritrea

- Friar Michele da Carbone, OFMCap (1894 – 1910)
- Friar Camillo Francesco Carrara, OFMCap (1910 – see below, later Bishop)

Vicars Apostolic of Eritrea

- Camillo Francesco Carrara, OFMCap. (see above), becoming Titular Bishop of Agathopolis (1911.02.07 – 1924.06.15)
- Celestino Annibale Cattaneo, OFMCap, Titular Bishop of Busiris (1925.03.24 – 1936.03.03) (from his retirement Titular Archbishop of Sebastopolis in Abasgia)
- Giovanni C. Luigi Marinoni, OFMCap, Titular Bishop of Pisita (1936.07.21 – 1959.07.25 see below)

Vicars Apostolic of Asmara

- Giovanni C. Luigi Marinoni, OFMCap, Titular Bishop of Pisita (see e) 1959.07.25 – 1961.08.12; on his retirement became Titular Archbishop of Amorium)
- Zenone Albino Testa, OFMCap, Titular Bishop of Tinista (1961.08.12 – 1971.06.12; previously Coadjutor Vicar Apostolic of Asmara from 1959.07.10) – he was the last bishop to be Vicar Apostolic of Asmara, which thereafter was entrusted to a priest as apostolic administrator

Apostolic administrator of the Apostolic Vicariate of Asmara

Friar Luca Milesi, OFMCap (1971 – 1995.12.21); from 1995.12.21 first Eparch (Bishop) of the Eritrean Catholic Eparchy of Barentu

== Sources and external links ==
- GigaCatholic, with biography links from ordinary incumbents lists
