= Apostolic Prefecture of Endeber =

The Apostolic Prefecture of Endeber was a short-lived (1940-1951) Latin Church missionary jurisdiction named after the town of Endeber in western Ethiopia.

Not being of diocesan rank, it was not part of an ecclesiastical province and was directly dependent on the Holy See.

== History ==
It was established on 1940.02.13, during the Italian occupation, as an apostolic prefecture on territory split off from the then Apostolic Vicariate of Gimma (now Nekemte).

On 1951.10.31 it was suppressed, its territory becoming part of the new Apostolic Exarchate of Addis Ababa.

== Ordinary ==
Its first and only Ordinary was Father Federico da Baselga, O.F.M. Cap. (1940.11.15 – resignation in 1945). He was the preacher of a retreat attended by Angelo Roncalli in 1953 and was the author of several books, including Le opera della miseriordia spiritual e corporale, Il giullare del creato and Il servo di Dio padre M. Antonio da Lavaur cappuccino.

== See also ==
- Roman Catholicism in Ethiopia
- Ethiopian Catholic Eparchy of Emdeber

== References and sources ==
GCatholic
