= Cathedral of the Holy Saviour, Adigrat =

Catholic church in Adigrat, Ethiopia

Coordinates: 14.2793°N 39.4658°E

Adigrat Cathedral በመንፈስ ቅዱስ በመድኃኒታችን ካቴድራል
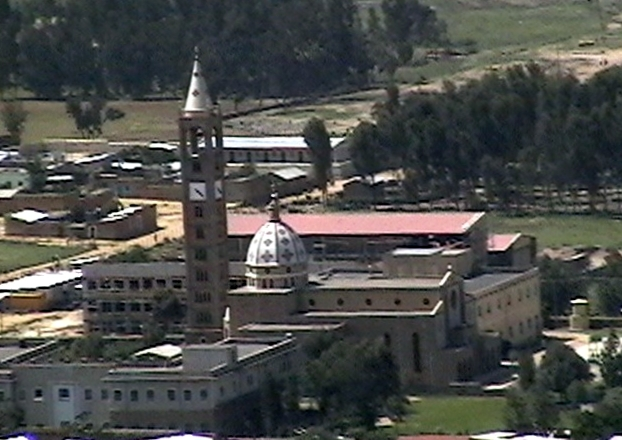
- Adigrat Cathedral

Religion
- Affiliation: Eastern Catholic
- Ecclesiastical or organisational status: Cathedral
- Status: Active

Location
- Location: Adigrat, Ethiopia
- Interactive map of Adigrat Cathedral በመንፈስ ቅዱስ በመድኃኒታችን ካቴድራል

Architecture
- Type: church
- Groundbreaking: 19 April 1969

The Cathedral of the Holy Saviour (Amharic: በመንፈስ ቅዱስ በመድኃኒታችን ካቴድራል), also called Adigrat Cathedral, is a Catholic church located in Adigrat, Ethiopia. It is the main place of worship of the Ethiopian Catholic Church. The cathedral is the mother church of the Eparchy of Adigrat (Eparchia Adigratensis). It belonged to the archeparchy of Addis Ababa (Archieparchia Neanthopolitana), which was elevated to its current status in 1961 by Pope John XXIII through the bull "Quod Venerabiles".

The cathedral was built on a site called Welwalo, which was reserved after World War II for the construction of a church, it was the first parish and, after the establishment of the Eparchy and with some additions, became the cathedral being dedicated to the Holy Savior on 19 April 1969, was realized on the basis of an Italian project including the great mural Giudizio Universale (1970) of the Ethiopian artist Afewerk Tekle.

== See also ==
- Ethiopian Catholic Church
- Catholic Church in Ethiopia
- St. Joseph Cathedral, Gambela
- Holy Trinity Cathedral, Sodo
