= Eritrean Catholic Eparchy of Segheneyti =

Eastern Catholic eparchy in Eritrea

Eparchy of Segheneyti Eparchia Segheneitensis

Location
- Country: Eritrea
- Ecclesiastical province: Asmara

Statistics
- Area: 29,499 km^{2} (11,390 sq mi)
- Population: Total; Catholics: (as of 2012); 850,000; 35,557 (4.2%)
- Parishes: 33

Information
- Denomination: Eritrean Catholic Church
- Rite: Alexandrian Rite
- Established: 24 February 2012 (14 years ago)
- Cathedral: Cathedral of St. Michael the Archangel

Current leadership
- Pope: Leo XIV
- Bishop: Fikremariam Hagos Tsalim

The Eritrean Catholic Eparchy of Segheneyti (Latin: Eparchia Segheneitensis) is an Eritrean Catholic eparchy located in the town of Segheneyti in Eritrea. It is a part of the ecclesiastical province of Asmara. The eparchy follows the Alexandrian Rite, and has a cathedral of Saint Michael the Archangel.

== History ==
On 24 February 2012, Pope Benedict XVI established the Eparchy of Segheneyti from the Eparchy of Asmara and it became suffragan of the Ethiopian Catholic Archeparchy of Addis Abeba.

With the establishment of the autonomous sui iuris Eritrean Catholic Church by Pope Francis on 19 January 2015, the Eparchy of Segheneyti became a suffragan the Eritrean Catholic Archeparchy of Asmara.

== Eparchial bishops ==
- Fikremariam Hagos Tsalim (24 February 2012 – present)
