= François Abraha =

Ethiopian bishop

- Eparch of Asmara
- Church: Ethiopian Catholic Church
- Diocese: Eparchy of Asmara
- In office: 9 April 1961 – 17 July 1984
- Predecessor: Asrate Mariam Yemmeru
- Successor: Zekarias Yohannes

Orders
- Ordination: 12 March 1944
- Consecration: 8 October 1961 by Asrate Mariam Yemmeru

Personal details
- Born: 2 April 1918 Asmara, Colony of Eritrea, Italian Empire
- Died: 26 March 2000 (aged 81) Asmara, Eritrea

François Abraha (2 April 1918 – 26 March 2000) was an Ethiopian bishop of the Ethiopian Catholic Church who served as the bishop of the Eparchy of Asmara from 1961 to 1984.

== Biography ==
He was born on 2 April 1918 in Asmara during the Italian colonization of Eritrea. His Sudanese father and Ethiopian mother married in Keren, Eritrea. Both died of the plague leaving a two-year-old orphan to be raised in a Catholic orphanage. He studied in Rome at the Pontifical Urban University, taught at the seminary in Addis Ababa, returned to Rome as dean of studies at the Ethiopian College, and founded the Ethiopian news service of Vatican Radio and worked there for two years until, in 1951, he was named secretary to the new Apostolic Exarch of Asmara, Bishop Ghebre Jesus Jacob.

He had been ordained a priest on 12 March 1944 under the British Military Administration of the region. On 9 April 1961, Pope John XXIII named him the first Bishop of Asmara. (Note: The Apostolic Exarchate of Asmara was elevated to the Eparchy of Asmara on 20 February 1961.) He received his episcopal consecration on 8 October from Asrate Mariam Yemmeru, Archbishop of Addis Ababa.

He attended the sessions of the Second Vatican Council and other synods in Rome. He was a founding member of the Ethiopian Episcopal Conference, the East African Countries Bishops Conference, and the Symposium of Episcopal Conferences of Africa and Madagascar. He made the restoration of the Ge'ez Liturgy, free of the influence of Roman Rite, a particular focus of his episcopate.

Pope John Paul II accepted his resignation on 17 July 1984, when he was 66. For the last decade of his life he required regular medical attention. He died in Asmara on 26 March 2000.

He was known for his ecumenical openness and for his activism against the Derg in Ethiopia. He repeatedly protested against Soviet involvement in the Eritrean struggle for independence.
