= Pontifical Alphonsian Academy =

Pontifical institution of higher education in Rome, Italy

Coordinates: 41.8954°N 12.5002°E

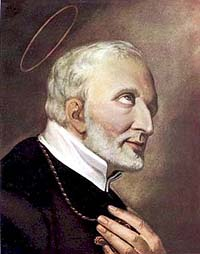
Alphonsus Liguori, whose teachings inspired the establishment of the Academy.

The Pontifical Alphonsian Academy (Italian: Pontificia Accademia Alfonsiana; Latin: Pontificia Academia Alphonsiana), also commonly known as the Alphonsianum, is a pontifical institution of higher education founded in 1949 by the Redemptorists and located in Rome, Italy.

== History ==
The Alphonsianum was founded in 1949 by the Redemptorists in Rome, Italy. Since 1960, the Academy has specialised in moral theology as a part of the Faculty of Theology of the Pontifical Lateran University. In 2023, Pope Francis granted the institute the title of "pontifical." The Academy grants both the licentiate and the doctoral degrees in moral theology.

== Notable alumni ==
=== Cardinals ===
- Fridolin Ambongo Besungu (1960–)
- Francesco Coccopalmerio (1938–)
- Polycarp Pengo (1944–)
- Severino Poletto (1933–2022)
- Óscar Rodríguez Maradiaga (1942–)
- Antoine Kambanda (1958–)

=== Archbishops and bishops ===
- Joseph Charron (1939–)
- Peter Comensoli (1960–)
- James D. Conley (1955–)
- Earl K. Fernandes (1972–)
- Patrick Hoogmartens (1952–)
- Thomas J. Hennen (1978–)
- Carl Frederick Mengeling (1930–2025)
- Franco Mulakkal (1964–)
- John Clayton Nienstedt (1947–)
- Michael Fors Olson (1966–)
- Luigi Padovese (1947–2010)
- Wojciech Polak (1964–)
- Joseph Indrias Rehmat (1966–)
- Hipólito Reyes Larios (1946–2021)
- Luis José Rueda Aparicio (1962–)
- Michael Sis (1960–)
- Fikremariam Hagos Tsalim (1970–)
- Edmund James Whalen (1958–)
- John Wilson (1968–)
- Anicetus Bongsu Antonius Sinaga (1941–2020)
- Atanasio Amisse Canira (1962 –)

=== Theologians ===
- Charles E. Curran (1934–)
