= St. Joseph Cathedral, Gambela =

Latin Catholic cathedral in Ethiopia

St. Joseph Cathedral ቅዱስ ዮሴፍ ካቴድራል

Religion
- Affiliation: Catholic Church (Latin Church)
- Ecclesiastical or organisational status: Cathedral
- Status: Active

Location
- Location: Gambela, Ethiopia
- Interactive map of St. Joseph Cathedral ቅዱስ ዮሴፍ ካቴድራል

Architecture
- Type: church

St. Joseph Cathedral (Amharic: ቅዱስ ዮሴፍ ካቴድራል) is a Catholic cathedral located in the town of Gambela, Gambela Region, Ethiopia.

It is a Latin Church congregation that is part of the Apostolic Vicariate of Gambella (Vicariatus Apostolicus Gambellensis) which was created on 16 November 2000. As the name indicates its patron saint is Saint Joseph. Nearby also is the Gambela National Park.

== See also ==
- Cathedral of the Holy Saviour, Adigrat
- Apostolic Vicariate of Gambella
- Roman Catholicism in Ethiopia
