= Eritrean Catholic Eparchy of Barentu =

Eastern Catholic eparchy in Eritrea

Eparchy of Barentu Eparchia Barentuanus

Location
- Country: Eritrea
- Ecclesiastical province: Asmara

Statistics
- Area: 44,986 km^{2} (17,369 sq mi)
- Population: Total; Catholics: (as of 2008); 718,500; 40,794 (5.7%)
- Parishes: 13

Information
- Denomination: Eritrean Catholic Church
- Rite: Alexandrian Rite
- Established: 21 December 1995 (30 years ago)
- Cathedral: Cathedral of St. Michael

Current leadership
- Pope: Leo XIV
- Bishop: Thomas Osman, OFMCap

Map
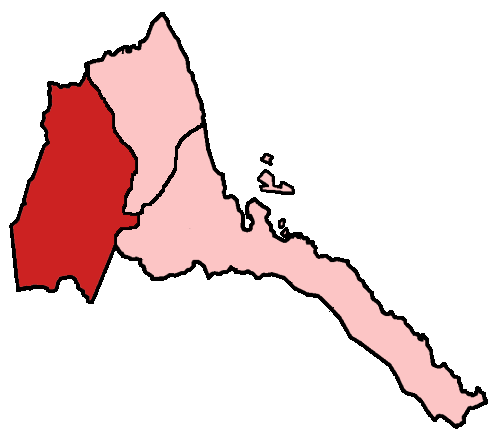

The Eritrean Catholic Eparchy of Barentu (Latin: Eparchia Barentuanus) is an Eritrean Catholic eparchy located in the town of Barentu in Eritrea. It is a part of the ecclesiastical province of Asmara.

== History ==
On 21 December 1995, Pope John Paul II established the Eparchy of Barentu from the Eparchy of Asmara and it became a suffragan of the Ethiopian Catholic Archeparchy of Addis Abeba. With the establishment of the autonomous sui iuris Eritrean Catholic Church by Pope Francis in January 2015, the Eparchy of Barentu became a suffragan the Eritrean Catholic Archeparchy of Asmara.

== Ordinaries ==
- Luca Milesi, OFMCap † (21 Dec 1995 – 4 Oct 2001)
- Thomas Osman, OFMCap (4 Oct 2001 – present)
