= Holy Trinity Cathedral, Sodo =

Church in Sodo, Ethiopia

Holy Trinity Cathedral መንፈስ ቅዱስ ሥላሴ ካቴድራል

Religion
- Affiliation: Roman Catholic
- Province: Apostolic Vicariate of Sodo
- Ecclesiastical or organisational status: Cathedral
- Status: Active

Location
- Location: Sodo, Ethiopia
- Interactive map of Holy Trinity Cathedral መንፈስ ቅዱስ ሥላሴ ካቴድራል
- Coordinates: 6°51′38.29″N 37°45′21.94″E

Architecture
- Type: church

The Holy Trinity Cathedral (Amharic: መንፈስ ቅዱስ ሥላሴ ካቴድራል) is a Roman Catholic church located in Sodo, Ethiopia.

The cathedral follows the Roman or Latin liturgical rite. As its name suggests, it was dedicated to the mystery of the Holy Trinity. The church is subject to the Apostolic Vicariate of Sodo (Vicariatus Apostolicus Soddensis ), which was inaugurated in 1982 by Pope John Paul II via the bull "compertum habentes".

The church is under the pastoral responsibility of the Bishop Tsegaye Keneni Derara.

== See also ==
- Roman Catholicism in Ethiopia
- St. Anthony Cathedral, Endibir
- Holy Trinity Cathedral (disambiguation)
