= Luca Milesi (bishop) =

Italian-born Eritrean Catholic bishop (1924–2008)

Most Reverend Luca Milesi, O.F.M. Cap.
- Eparchial Bishop of Barentu
- Church: Ethiopian Catholic Church
- Appointed: 21 December 1995
- Installed: 4 February 1996
- Term ended: 4 October 2001
- Predecessor: Position established
- Successor: Thomas Osman
- Other post: Apostolic Administrator of Vicariate Apostolic of Asmara (1971–1995)

Orders
- Ordination: 4 March 1950
- Consecration: 4 February 1996 by Paulos Tzadua, Zekarias Yohannes, Kidane-Mariam Teklehaimanot

Personal details
- Born: Luca Milesi; 21 April 1924 San Giovanni Bianco, Kingdom of Italy
- Died: 22 May 2008 (aged 84) Asmara, Eritrea
- Buried: Barentu, Eritrea

Luca Milesi O.F.M. Cap. (21 April 1924 – 22 May 2008) was an Italian-born Eritrean hierarch of the Ethiopian Catholic Church (Note: Until 2015 not existed separated Eritrean Catholic Church sui iuris, and Eparchies in Eritrea belonged to the Ethiopian Catholic Church sui iuris.) who served as the first Eparch of the Eparchy of Barentu in Eritrea from 1995 to 2001. Previously he served in the Latin Rite as an Apostolic Administrator of the Vicariate Apostolic of Asmara since 1971 until 1995.

== Biography ==
Luca Milesi was born on 21 April 1924 in San Giovanni Bianco, in the Province of Bergamo, Italy. He joined the Order of Friars Minor Capuchin and was ordained a priest on 4 March 1950.

Following his ordination, Milesi dedicated his life to missionary work in East Africa. On 26 June 1971, he was appointed an Apostolic Administrator of the Vicariate Apostolic of Asmara, the Latin Rite jurisdiction in Eritrea.

On 21 December 1995, with the suppression of this structure and the eriction of the new Eparchies of the Ethiopian Catholic Church, Milesi was appointed the first Eparch of Barentu. He received his episcopal consecration on 4 February 1996 from Cardinal Paulos Tzadua, with Bishops Zekarias Yohannes and Kidane-Mariam Teklehaimanot serving as co-consecrators.

During his tenure, Milesi was noted for his commitment to the development of the local church and his humanitarian efforts during periods of regional conflict. His experiences and the challenges of the Eritrean mission were documented in his personal travel diaries.

On 4 October 2001, Pope John Paul II accepted his resignation from the pastoral governance of the eparchy upon reaching the age limit. He was succeeded by Thomas Osman.

Milesi died in Asmara on 22 May 2008 at the age of 84 and was buried near the eparchial chapel in Barentu.
