= Eritrean Catholic Eparchy of Keren =

Eastern Catholic eparchy in Eritrea

Coordinates: 15.774931°N 38.448618°E

Eparchy of Keren Eparchia Kerensis
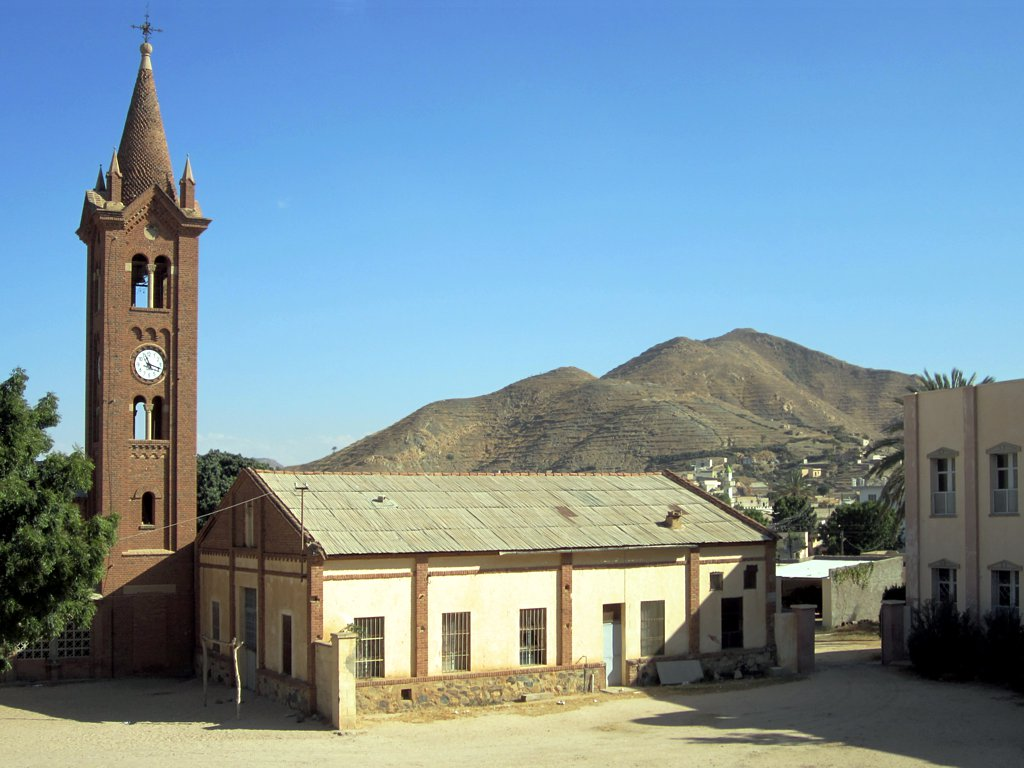
- The old Church of San Antonio in the Keren eparchy

Location
- Country: Eritrea
- Ecclesiastical province: Asmara

Statistics
- Area: 25,949 km^{2} (10,019 sq mi)
- Population: Total; Catholics: (as of 2014); 448,968; 49,538 (11.0%)
- Parishes: 38

Information
- Denomination: Eritrean Catholic Church
- Rite: Alexandrian Rite
- Established: 21 December 1995 (30 years ago)

Current leadership
- Pope: Leo XIV
- Bishop: Kidane Yebio

Map
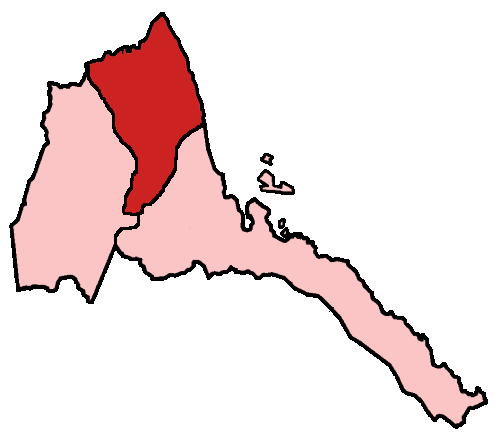

The Eritrean Catholic Eparchy of Keren (Latin: Eparchia Kerensis) is an Eritrean Catholic eparchy centred in the city of Keren in Eritrea. It is a suffragan of the Archeparchy of Asmara, and a constituent eparchy of the Eritrean Catholic Church.

== History ==
The first Catholic church in Keren was built in 1865 but was demolished in 1871 by the authorities of the Khedivate of Egypt, who in the 1870s held much of Eritrea. The Apostolic Vicariate of Abyssinia, which from 1870 to 1894 had its headquarters in Keren, was allowed to rebuild the church, began the work on 24 May 1873 and completed it and blessed it on 14 February 1875. Keren was thus an early centre for the nascent Catholic community that uses the Ge'ez liturgical rite and that has been recognized as the Eritrean Catholic Church in 1925.

On 21 December 1995, with territory taken from the Eparchy of Asmara, Pope John Paul II established the Eparchy of Keren as a suffragan see of the Archeparchy of Addis Ababa.

With the establishment of the autonomous (sui iuris) Eritrean Catholic Church by Pope Francis on 19 January 2015, the Eparchy of Keren became a suffragan of the Eritrean Catholic Archeparchy of Asmara.

== Territory ==
The eparchy covers what at the time of its creation were the Eritrean provinces of Senhit and Sahel, with an area of 25,949 km^{2} (10,019 sq mi), and a total population of 448,968, of whom 49,538 (11.0%) are Catholics.

== Cathedral ==
The present cathedral seat of the eparchy is at Saint Michael's Cathedral, located west of the town centre. A much larger cathedral, also dedicated to Saint Michael, is under construction south of the centre.

== Eparchial bishops ==
- Tesfamariam Bedho (21 December 1995 – 29 July 2002)
- Kidane Yebio (4 January 2003 – present)
