= Musie Ghebreghiorghis =

Eritrean-born Ethiopian Catholic bishop (born 1949)

Most Reverend Musie Ghebreghiorghis, OFM Cap.
- Bishop Emeritus of Emdeber
- Church: Ethiopian Catholic Church
- Province: Addis Ababa
- Diocese: Emdeber
- Appointed: 25 November 2003
- Term ended: 23 August 2024
- Predecessor: Position established
- Successor: Teshome Fikre Woldetensae

Orders
- Ordination: 13 June 1976
- Consecration: 8 February 2004 by Berhaneyesus Demerew Souraphiel

Personal details
- Born: Musie Ghebreghiorghis; 26 July 1949 (age 76) Aderho, Eritrean British Military Administration (now Eritrea)

Musie Ghebreghiorghis OFM Cap. (born 26 July 1949) is an Eritrean-born Ethiopian Catholic hierarch who served as the first Eparchial Bishop of the Eparchy of Emdeber from 2003 until his retirement in 2024.

== Biography ==
=== Early life and ministry ===
Musie Ghebreghiorghis was born on 26 July 1949 in Aderho, present day in Southern region, Eritrea. He joined the Order of Friars Minor Capuchin and was ordained to the priesthood on 13 June 1976.

He pursued higher studies in Ireland, where he obtained a licentiate in Franciscan spirituality. Following his studies, he held several significant roles within the Capuchin Order, including serving as master of novices and counselor for the Vice-Province. Prior to his episcopal appointment, he served as the rector of the Capuchin Philosophical and Theological Institute in Addis Ababa, an institution of central importance for the training of clergy across the ecclesiastical jurisdictions of southern Ethiopia.

=== Episcopal ministry ===
On 25 November 2003, Pope John Paul II established the Eparchy of Emdeber from territory formerly belonging to the Archeparchy of Addis Ababa. Ghebreghiorghis was appointed as its first bishop. He received his episcopal consecration on 8 February 2004 from Archbishop Berhaneyesus Demerew Souraphiel.

During his leadership, the Eparchy of Emdeber focused heavily on humanitarian and developmental projects in the Gurage Zone, including initiatives in education and food security. In 2023, he emphasized the necessity for "radical conversion" in the African Church to better serve the faithful in the modern era.

On 23 August 2024, Pope Francis accepted his resignation from the pastoral governance of the eparchy, upon him reaching the age limit. He was succeeded by Teshome Fikre Woldetensae.
