= Urima =

Former town on the Euphrates River

Coordinates: 37°06′37″N 37°51′56″E

Urima or Ourima, also known as Antiochia ad Euphratem and Arulis, was a town on the Euphrates River of Classical Anatolia, inhabited from Hellenistic to Byzantine times. It was in the late Roman province of Euphratensis. Urima was the seat of a bishop; no longer a residential bishopric, it remains a titular see of the Roman Catholic Church.

Its site is located near Horum Höyük, in a now-submerged portion of Gaziantep Province in Asiatic Turkey.
