= Eritrean Catholic Archeparchy of Asmara =

Eastern Catholic jurisdiction in Eritrea

Coordinates: 15.340987°N 38.936711°E

Archeparchy of Asmara Archieparchia Asmarensis
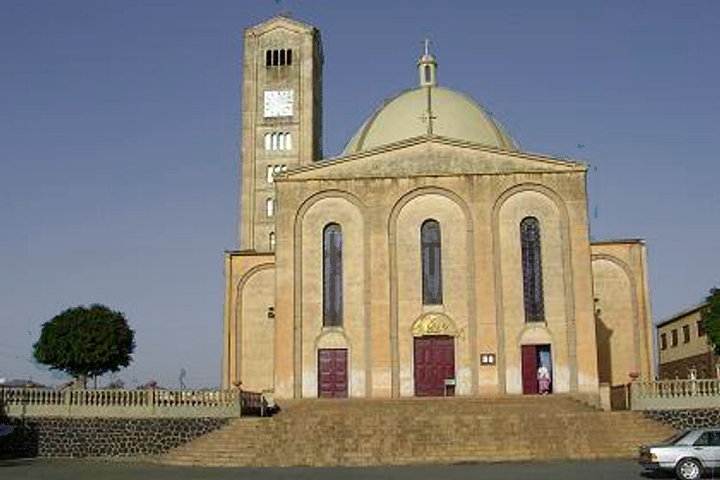
- Kidane Mehret Cathedral; Cathedral of the archeparchy

Location
- Country: Eritrea
- Ecclesiastical province: Asmara

Statistics
- Area: 53,183 km^{2} (20,534 sq mi)
- Population: Total; Catholics: (as of 2012); 3,934,000; 67,314 (1.7%)
- Parishes: 58

Information
- Denomination: Eritrean Catholic Church
- Rite: Alexandrian Rite
- Established: 4 July 1930 (95 years ago)
- Cathedral: Kidane Mehret Cathedral

Current leadership
- Pope: Leo XIV
- Archeparch: Menghesteab Tesfamariam, M.C.C.I.

Map
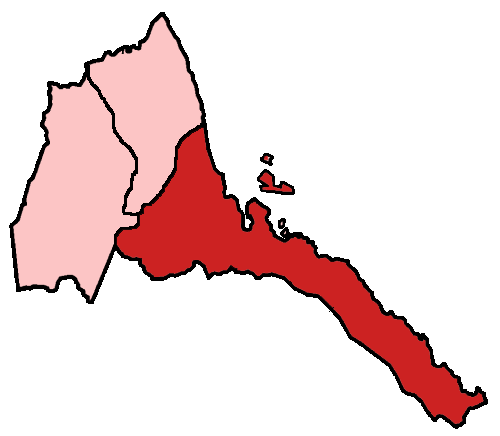

The Eritrean Catholic Archeparchy of Asmara, officially the Archeparchy of Asmara (Latin: Archieparchia Asmarensis or Latin: Metropolitana Ecclesia Asmarensis), more informally Asmara of the Eritreans, is the metropolitan see of the Eritrean Catholic Church, a sui iuris Eastern Catholic Church whose territory corresponds to that of the State of Eritrea in the Horn of Africa. It depends on the Roman Congregation for the Oriental Churches.

As head of an autonomous particular church, the Metropolitan Archeparch, currently Menghesteab Tesfamariam, is mentioned by name, after the Pope, in the liturgies celebrated within the suffragan eparchies of Barentu, Keren and Segheneyti.

The Eritrean Catholic Church, like the Ethiopian Catholic Church, from which it was separated in 2015, uses in its liturgy the Ethiopic variant of the Alexandrian Rite in the Ge'ez language. It is the Eastern Catholic counterpart of the Eritrean Orthodox Tewahedo Church, which was granted autocephaly in 1993, and is headed by an Orthodox Patriarch, who also is based in the Eritrean capital. Since the Eritrean Catholic Church is a metropolitan church, not a patriarchal or major archiepiscopal Church, the power of its metropolitan and council of hierarchs is limited to its own territory, which covers all of Eritrea, (East Africa or, more precisely, the Horn of Africa). Its faithful outside of Eritrea are immediately subject to the Pope.

The cathedral of the sui iuris metropolitan see is Kidane Mehret Cathedral in Asmara, the capital city of Eritrea.

== Statistics ==
In 2015, the Archeparchy pastorally served 31,850 Catholics (1% of the 3,258,000 population) in 59 parishes, with 336 priests (20 diocesan, 316 religious), 2 permanent deacons, 602 men religious, 498 sisters and 206 seminarians.

== Metropolitan sui iuris Church ==
While patriarchal and major archiepiscopal Eastern Catholic Churches may be structured as provinces, each headed by a metropolitan – the Ukrainian Greek Catholic Church has several, two of them in the United States and Canada – a metropolitan sui iuris Church, such as the Eritrean Catholic Church, has by definition only a single metropolitan of a fixed see.

The Archeparchy of Asmara is the episcopal see of the single metropolitan of the Eritrean Catholic Church and has the following suffragan sees, all of which are daughter eparchies, having once been part of the then Eparchy of Asmara, which for a while covered the whole of Eritrea:

- Eritrean Catholic Eparchy of Barentu (1995)
- Eritrean Catholic Eparchy of Keren (1995)
- Eritrean Catholic Eparchy of Segheneyti (2012)

== History ==
In 1839 Saint Giustino de Jacobis, an Italian Vincentian priest, arrived in the area that is now Eritrea and northern Ethiopia. He chose to use the local liturgy in Ge'ez, rather than the Roman Rite in Latin. Attracted by his learning and sanctity, many local clergy and laity entered into communion with the Catholic Church. They established an Ethiopic-Rite Catholic community under the care of the Apostolic Vicariate of Abyssinia (now Ethiopic Metropolitanate sui juris of Addis Abeba), which had its headquarters at Keren and was under the care of the Vincentian Fathers.

After Italy took possession of Eritrea and declared it an Italian colony, the Holy See, in view of the changed situation, set up on 19 September 1894 a separate Apostolic Prefecture of Eritrea, which was entrusted to Italian Capuchins. In the following year, the governor of the colony expelled the remaining Vincentian priests, who were French, on the unfounded suspicion of having encouraged armed resistance.

In 1911 the Apostolic Prefecture was promoted to the rank of Apostolic Vicariate, headed therefore by a titular bishop, and the headquarters were moved from Keren to Asmara.

With the arrival of Italian immigrants, the Capuchins promoted the Roman Rite. Unrest among the Eritrean clergy led to the sending in 1927 of the future cardinal Alexis Lépicier as Apostolic Visitor to Eritrea. As a result of his report, Father Kidanè-Maryam Cassà was appointed at first Pro-Apostolic Vicar for the Ethiopic-Rite Catholics and then, on 4 July 1930, bishop in charge of an independent Ordinariate of Eritrea. His official title was Ordinary for Ethiopic-Rite indigenous Catholics of Eritrea (Latin: Ordinarius pro catholicis indigenis Erythraeae aethiopici ritus). Pope Pius XII elevated this ordinariate as the Apostolic Exarchate of Asmara on 31 October 1951. On 20 February 1961, Pope John XXIII elevated it to an eparchy. Although officially described in Latin as Asmaren(sis), the eparchy at first appeared in the Annuario Pontificio under the heading "Asmara of the Ethiopians", at a time when the entry for the Apostolic Vicariate for the Latins in Eritrea, officially described in Latin as Asmaren(sis) Latinorum, appeared under the simple name of "Asmara". From the year 1976 onward, the eparchy appeared in that annual publication under the simple heading "Asmara", like the Apostolic Vicariate of Asmara.

The eparchy lost territory on 21 December 1995, when the Eparchies of Barentu and Keren were established, and again in 2012, when the Eparchy of Segheneyti was established.

In January 2015, Pope Francis erected the Metropolitan sui iuris Eritrean Catholic Church, elevating the Eparchy of Asmara to Metropolitan Archeparchy and making the three daughter eparchies its suffragans.

== Episcopal ordinaries ==
Ordinaries for Ethiopic-Rite indigenous Catholics of Eritrea

- Kidanè-Maryam Cassà (4 July 1930 – 24 February 1951), Titular Bishop of Thibaris (1930.07.04 – death 1951.09.01)
- Ghebre Jesus Jacob, Titular Bishop of Erythrum (1951.02.24 – death 1969.01.22) and Apostolic Administrator for Ethiopic-Rite faithful in Eritrea (24 February 1951 – 21 October 1951 see below)

Apostolic Exarchate of Asmara

- Ghebre Jesus Jacob, Titular Bishop of Erythrum (1958.02.24 – death 1969.01.22) and ?Apostolic Administrator for Ethiopic-Rite faithful in Eritrea (1951.10.21 – ?), Ordaining bishop for the Ethiopic Rite in Rome (? – death 1969.01.22)
- Asrate Mariam Yemmeru, Titular Bishop of Urima and acting Apostolic Exarch of Asmara (3 February 1958 - 20 February 1961 see below), and see below

Suffragan Eparchs of Asmara

- Asrate Mariam Yemmeru, Titular Bishop of Urima and acting Eparch of Asmara (see above 1961.02.20 – 1961.04.09); later Metropolitan of Addis Ababa (1961.04.09 – retired 1977.02.24), died 1990.08.10
- François Abraha (9 April 1961 - retired 17 July 1984), died 2000.03.26
- Zekarias Yohannes (17 July 1984 - retired 25 June 2001); died 2016.12.01; previously Titular Bishop of Barca and Auxiliary Bishop of Asmara (1981.01.29 – succession 1984.07.17)
- Menghesteab Tesfamariam, M.C.C.I. (25 June 2001 – 19 January 2015 see below)

Metropolitan Archeparchs of Asmara

- Menghesteab Tesfamariam, M.C.C.I. (see above 19 January 2015 – ...), President of Council of the Eritrean Church (2015.01.19 – ...).

== Sources and external links ==
- GCatholic, with Google map and satellite photo - data for all sections
- local language archdiocesan website
