= Endibir =

Emdibir እምድብር (Amharic) Berro, Gottam Gebya
- Location within Ethiopia
- Coordinates: 8°7′N 37°56′E
- Country: Ethiopia
- Region: Central Ethiopia Regional State
- Zone: Gurage
- Elevation: 2,130 m (6,990 ft)

Population (2005)
  - Total: 4,057
- Time zone: UTC+3 (EAT)
- Climate: Cwb

Emdibir is a town south-west of Addis Ababa, in the central part of Ethiopia. Located in the Gurage Zone of the Central Ethiopia Regional State (formerly, Southern Nations, Nationalities and Peoples' Region), this town has a latitude and longitude of 8°7′N 37°56′E and an elevation between 2130 and 2164 meters above sea level. It is the administrative center of Cheha woreda.

According to the Gurage Zone local government, Emdibir is one of 12 towns with electrical power, one of 11 with telephone service and one of nine that have postal service. An all-weather road was built in 1963 by the Gurage Road Association, which connected Emdibir to Addis Ababa through Welkite and Hosaena.

The seat of the Ethiopian Catholic Eparchy of Emdeber is located in this town.

== History ==
In the early 1930s there was a Catholic mission of the Capuchins, usually with a Père and a Frère; they did some medical work and had a school. During the Italian occupation the mission was renamed "Missione della Consolata". The Emdibir market was held every Friday.

In 1984 drought affected almost every household in Emdibir: there was no rain, and the enset in many households was affected by a plant disease known as chire. Although it was insufficient, the community received aid in the form of clothes, maize, milk, butter and oil from the Catholic Relief Service, as well as some of the richer farmers in the area.

== Demographics ==
Based on figures from the Central Statistical Agency in 2005, Emdibir has an estimated total population of 4,057 of whom 1,992 are men and 2,065 are women. The 1994 national census reported this town had a total population of 2,239 of whom 1,103 were men and 1,136 were women.
