= Zekarias Yohannes =

- Eparch of Asmara
- Church: Ethiopian Catholic Church
- Diocese: Eparchy of Asmara
- In office: 17 July 1984 – 25 June 2001
- Predecessor: François Abraha
- Successor: Menghesteab Tesfamariam
- Previous posts: Titular Eparch of Barca (1981-1984); Auxiliary Eparch of Asmara (1981-1984)

Orders
- Ordination: 2 June 1949
- Consecration: 6 June 1981 by Paulos Tzadua

Personal details
- Born: 13 May 1925
- Died: 1 December 2016 (aged 91)

Zekarias Yohannes (13 May 1925 – 1 December 2016) was an Ethiopian bishop of the Ethiopian Catholic Church who was bishop of the Eparchy of Asmara from 1984 to 2001.

He was born in Adigenú. He was ordained a priest of the Eparchy of Asmara on 2 June 1949. Pope John Paul II appointed him auxiliary bishop of Asmara and titular bishop of Barca on 29 January 1981. He received his episcopal consecration on 6 June from Paulos Tzadua, Archbishop of Addis Ababa. He was appointed bishop of Asmara, then in Ethiopia and after 1993 in Eritrea, on 17 July 1984. He retired on 25 June 2001.

He died on 1 December 2016.
