= Menghesteab Tesfamariam =

Eritrean Catholic archbishop

The Most Reverend Menghesteab Tesfamariam M.C.C.I.
- Archbishop of Asmara
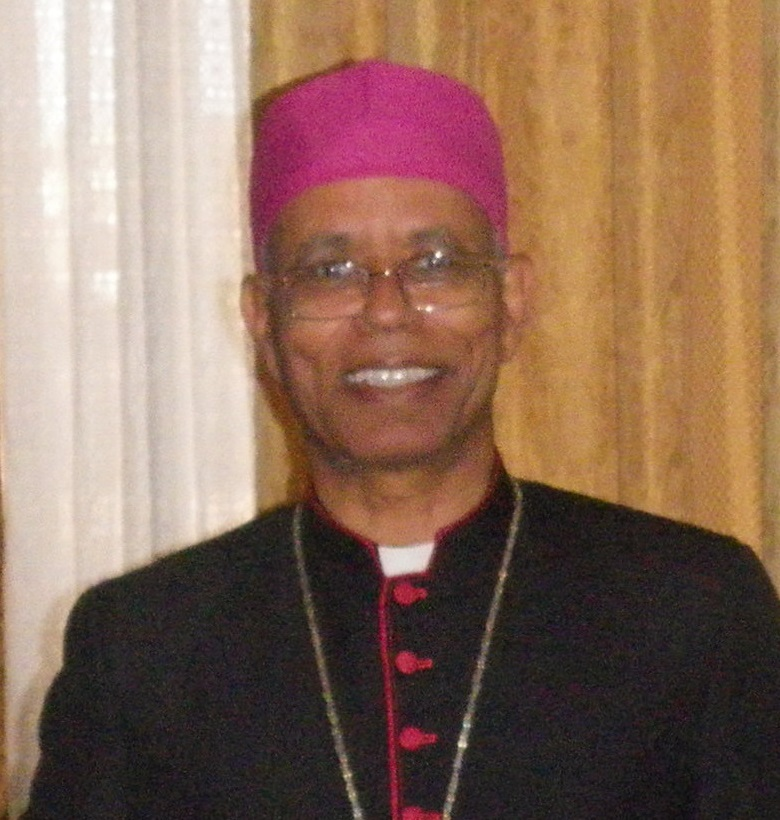
- Church: Eritrean Catholic Church
- Archdiocese: Asmara
- Appointed: 19 January 2015
- Installed: 16 September 2015
- Previous post: Ethiopian Catholic Bishop of Asmara (2001-2015)

Orders
- Ordination: 18 February 1979
- Consecration: 16 September 2001 by Zekarias Yohannes

Personal details
- Born: 24 December 1948 (age 77) Berakit, Eritrean British Military Administration (now Eritrea)
- Denomination: Catholic Church

Menghesteab Tesfamariam, M.C.C.I. (born 24 December 1948) is an Eritrean Catholic hierarch who has served as the Metropolitan Archbishop of Asmara and head of the Eritrean Catholic Church since 2015. (Note: Until 2015 not existed separated Eritrean Catholic Church sui iuris, and Eparchies in Eritrea belonged to the Ethiopian Catholic Church sui iuris.) He is a member of the Comboni Missionaries and has been a bishop since 2001.

== Biography ==
Menghesteab Tesfamariam was born in Berakit, in the Asmara Eparchy, on 24 December 1948. He joined the Comboni Missionaries of the Heart of Jesus on 1 September 1971, took his first vows on 25 June 1973, and his final vows on 15 March 1978. After studying philosophy and theology, he was ordained a priest on 18 February 1979.

His first assignment was as parish vicar in Namalu, Uganda, from 1979 to 1985. He was responsible for the formation of Comboni postulants in Addis Ababa from 1985 to 1990. From July to December 1990 he studied at the University of Chicago. For the next ten months he was again charged with the formation of postulants, now in Chicago. He remained there as local superior of the Combonis from November 1993 to the end of 1996.

Pope John Paul II appointed him Bishop of Asmara in Eritrea on 25 June 2001, and he received his episcopal consecration from his predecessor in Asmara, Bishop Zekarias Yohannes, on 16 September.

On June 30, 2011, in a speech in Nairobi, he proposed the establishment of a new scholarship fund in each diocese in the Association of Member Episcopal Conferences in Eastern Africa (AMECEA) to provide assistance to underprivileged students.

On 19 January 2015, Pope Francis established the Eritrean Catholic Church as an autonomous sui iuris Eastern Catholic Church separate from the Ethiopian Catholic Church. At the same time he elevated the Eparchy of Asmara to the dignity of an Archeparchy and named Tesfamariam to that position.

== Notes ==
Catholic Church titles
Preceded by Zekarias Yohannes	Bishop of Asmara of the Ethiopians; 2001–2015	Succeeded by Himself as Archbishop of Asmara of the Eritreans
Preceded by Himself as Bishop of Asmara of the Ethiopians	Archbishop of Asmara of the Eritreans; 2015–present	Incumbent
