= Eritrean Catholic Church =

Eastern Catholic church

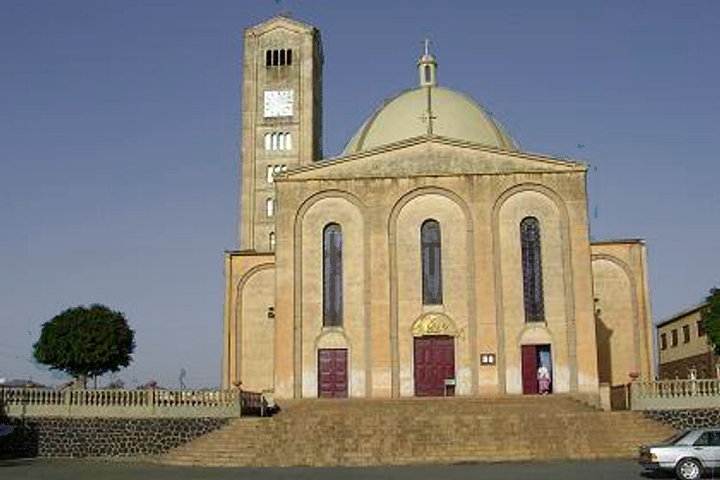
- Kidane Mehret Cathedral, Asmara
- Classification: Eastern Catholic
- Polity: Episcopal
- Governance: Metropolitanate
- Pope: Leo XIV
- Metropolitan: Menghesteab Tesfamariam
- Liturgy: Alexandrian Rite
- Headquarters: Asmara
- Founder: Saint Frumentius in 328AD Axum (according to Catholic tradition); Abune Menghesteab in 2015AD Asmara
- Branched from: Ethiopian Catholic Church
- Members: 167,722 (2017)

The Eritrean Catholic Church is a sui iuris (autonomous) Eastern Catholic church based in Eritrea, in full communion with the Holy See of Rome. It was established in 2015 when its territory was separated from the Ethiopian Catholic Church. The church is organized under a metropolitan bishop who exercises oversight of a number of suffragan dioceses. In its liturgical services, it uses the Alexandrian Rite in the Geʽez language.

Within the Tewahedo tradition, the principal distinction is ecclesial: the Eritrean Catholic Tewahedo Church is in full communion with the Pope of Rome, whereas the Eritrean Orthodox Tewahedo Church is not; both preserve the Geʽez Rite and the historic Tewahedo liturgical-theological heritage.

== History ==
=== Pre-20th century ===
In 1839 Giustino de Jacobis, an Italian Vincentian priest, arrived as a missionary in the area that is now Eritrea and northern Ethiopia. He preferred to employ the local liturgical rite in Geʽez rather than the Roman Rite in Latin. He attracted a considerable number of local priests and laity to enter into full communion with the Catholic Church. He died in 1860 at Halai, near Hebo, in what is now the Southern Administrative Region of Eritrea.

In 1869, Italy began to occupy Eritrea and in 1890 declared it a colony of the Kingdom of Italy, fostering immigration of Italians. In view of the changed situation, the Holy See set up on 19 September 1894 the Apostolic Prefecture of Eritrea, entrusted to Italian Capuchins, thus removing Eritrea from the territory of the Apostolic Vicariate of Abyssinia of the Vincentians, who were predominantly French. In the following year, the governor of the colony expelled the remaining Vincentian priests on the unfounded suspicion of having encouraged armed resistance.

Most of the local population who became Catholics had been members of the Coptic Orthodox Church, whose Ethiopian portion became the Ethiopian Orthodox Tewahedo Church in the mid-20th century when it was granted its own patriarch by Cyril VI, Pope of the Coptic Orthodox Church of Alexandria. They kept the rites of that church in the ancient liturgical language of Geʽez, giving rise to an Ethiopic-Rite Catholic community.

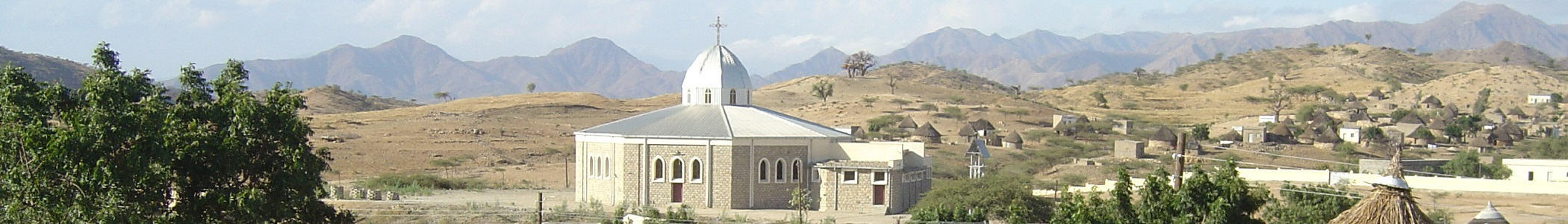
Catholic church in Halib Mentel in the eparchy of Keren

=== First half of 20th century ===
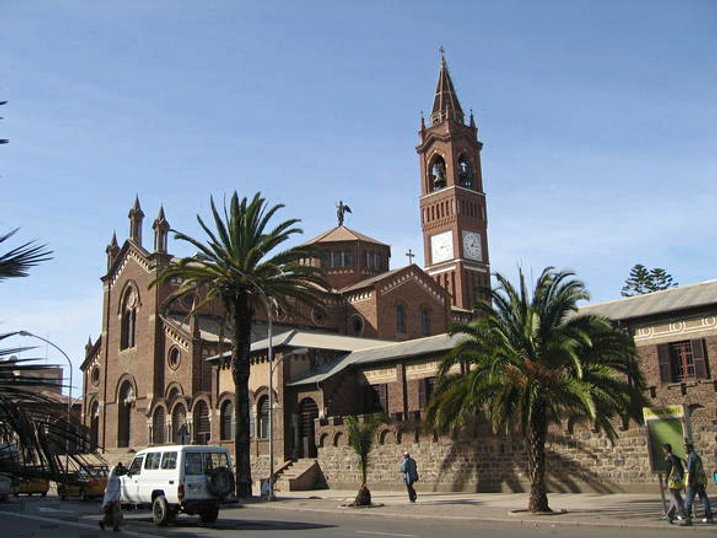
What was once the principal church of the Apostolic Vicariate of Eritrea

The prefecture apostolic of Eritrea was raised by the Holy See to the status of Apostolic Vicariate (headed by a titular bishop) in 1911. In addition, an Ethiopic Rite Ordinariate of Eritrea was established on 4 July 1930, removing those Catholics from the jurisdiction of the then much larger Latin Church vicariate. Father Kidanè-Maryam Cassà, who since 1926 had been their pro-vicar within the Vicariate, was appointed their ordinary and on 3 August 1930 was ordained titular bishop of Thibaris in the chapel of the Pontifical Ethiopian College in Vatican City. At that time they numbered less than 3% of the population of Eritrea.

The greater importance at that time of the Latin Vicariate is reflected in the impressive church dedicated to Our Lady of the Rosary that was completed in 1923 as the seat of the Apostolic Vicariate. Even after the demise of the Vicariate in 1995, it is still called "the cathedral".

=== Association with Ethiopia ===
At the beginning of the 1940s nearly 28% of the population of Italian Eritrea, which had been part of Italian East Africa since 1936, was Catholic; mostly Italians and of the Latin Church. There was a pronounced fall in the number of Italians present after the end of the Second World War, when Eritrea was at first under British military administration. The British census of 1949 showed that Asmara, the capital, had only 17,183 Italians out of a total population of 127,579. The departure of Italians accelerated further when Eritrea came under Ethiopian authority at the end of 1950. The relationship between the Latin Vicariate and the Ethiopic Ordinariate was thus inverted. On 31 October 1951, the Ordinariate of Eritrea was raised to the level of an Exarchate (the Eastern equivalent of a Vicariate) under the name of the Apostolic Exarchate of Asmara, at the same time as the Apostolic Exarchate of Addis Ababa was created. On 25 July 1959, the name of the Latin Vicariate of Eritrea, which in spite of the greatly reduced number of its faithful kept its rank, was changed to Apostolic Vicariate of Asmara. However, after the fourth and last bishop who was Vicar Apostolic of Asmara retired on 2 June 1974, the Vicariate was administered by the Capuchin priest Luca Milesi, who became a bishop only when the Vicariate was suppressed in 1995 and he was appointed the first Eparch of Barentu.

On 28 February 1961, the Ethiopian Catholic Church was established as a metropolitan sui iuris church, consisting of the Archeparchy of Addis Ababa and two suffragan sees, one of which was that of Asmara, while the other was the newly created Ethiopian Catholic Eparchy of Adigrat (previously the Prefecture Apostolic of Tigray).

Coincidentally, the Eritrean War of Independence began later that year, and ended in 1991 with a decisive Eritrean victory.

Southern Administrative Region, in which is situated the cathedral town of the Eparchy of Segheneyti

=== In independent Eritrea ===
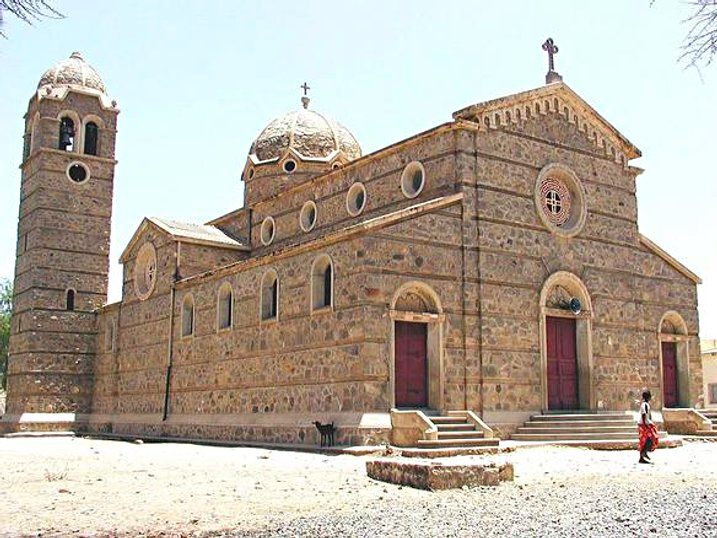
Church (formerly Latin Church) in Akrur in the eparchy of Segheneyti

On 21 December 1995, under Pope John Paul II, parts of the Eparchy of Asmara became two new eparchies, based respectively in Keren and Barentu. The much-reduced Apostolic Vicariate of Asmara was abolished. The only Catholic Church jurisdictions in Eritrea were thus all of the Ethiopian Catholic Church, making Eritrea the only country where all Catholics, including members of the Latin Church, are entrusted to the care of Eastern Catholic bishops.

On 24 February 2012, Pope Benedict XVI created a fourth eparchy based in Segheneyti with territory taken from the then Eparchy of Asmara.

On 19 January 2015, Pope Francis erected the Eritrean Catholic Church as an autonomous sui iuris metropolitan church with Asmara as its metropolitan see and the other three Eritrean eparchies as suffragans, separating it from the Ethiopian Catholic Church, whose metropolitan see was left with three suffragans.

== Organisation ==
=== Eparchies ===
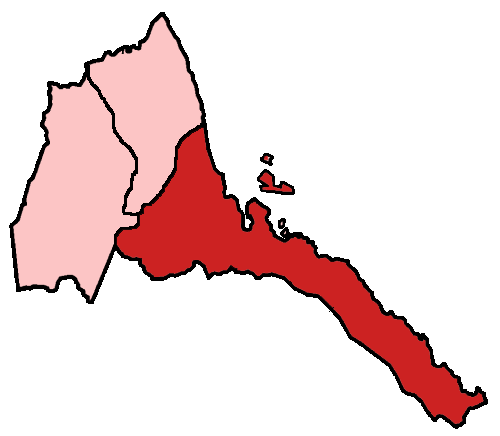
Eritrean Catholic eparchies from 1995 to 2012. In red Asmara, from which Segheneyti was taken in 2012. In north Keren; in west Barentu.

There are four eparchies (bishoprics) in the country:

- The metropolitan see is the Archeparchy of Asmara
- The Eparchy of Barentu with faithful drawn largely from the Kunama people
- The Eparchy of Keren with the highest percentage of the local population (nearly 12%) and with faithful drawn largely from the Bilen people
- The Eparchy of Segheneyti in the country's Southern Administrative Region.

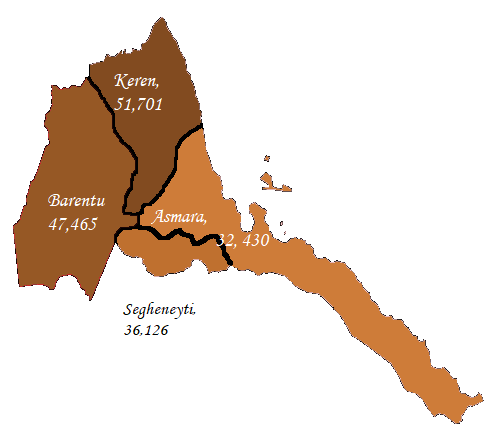

=== Current hierarchy of the church ===
The present Eritrean Catholic episcopate (4 hierarchs as per 1 December 2016) is as follows:

Metropolitan archbishop:

- Menghesteab Tesfamariam, MCCJ, Metropolitan Archbishop of Asmara (since 2001)

Eparchial bishops:

- Thomas Osman, OFMCap, Bishop of Barentu (since 2001)
- Kidane Yebio, Bishop of Keren (since 2003)
- Fikremariam Hagos Tsalim, Bishop of Segheneity (since 2012)

Emeritus hierarchs:

- None

=== Statistics ===
Eparchy	Asmara	Barentu	Keren	Segheneyti	Total
Catholics	31,850	45,580	49,538	35,560	162,528
Resident bishops	2	1	1	1	5
Parishes	59	13	44	34	107
Eparchial priests	20	7	51	25	103
Religious priests	316	20	22	37	395
Men religious	602	22	63	90	777
Women religious	498	35	81	105	719
Permanent deacons	2	0	0	0	2
Seminarians	208	9	24	13	254

== Relations with Government of Eritrea ==
Since 2004, the State Department of the United States of America has repeatedly listed the State of Eritrea as a country of particular concern with regard to religious freedom. However, it indicates that the Catholic Church is granted some favours, limited in number and extent, not granted to other religious communities: "permission to host some visiting clergy; to receive funding from the Holy See; to travel for religious purposes and training in small numbers; and to receive exemptions from national service for seminary students and nuns". National service is demanded of most Eritreans, men and women, between the ages of 18 and 40, or in practice 50 or more, and is often of indefinite length.

The Catholic bishops issued on 25 May 2014, the 23rd anniversary of the independence of the state, a pastoral letter that some saw as critical of the Government. An English translation of the document, the original of which is in the Tigrinya language, extends to 17 pages. The bishops spoke of the emigration of the many young Eritreans who risk their lives in the hope of emigrating to other countries. They repeated what they had written in 2001: "No-one leaves a land of milk and honey to seek another country offering the same opportunities. If one's homeland is a place of peace, jobs and freedom of expression there is no reason to leave it to suffer hardship, loneliness and exile in an effort to look for opportunity elsewhere." They spoke also of "the delusion engendered as result of the non-achievement of the ends proposed, the uselessness of one’s own aspirations, looking to distant lands as the only alternative for self-fulfilment, are bringing a growing number of people to frustration and desperation. They find themselves looking at a horizon that grows always darker and heavier. Alongside this, the breakup of the family unit inside the country – through military service unlimited in terms of time and monetary reward and through the imprisonment of many young people in actual prison or in punishment camps – is exposing to misery not only elderly parents with no visible means of support, but also entire families and it is having serious consequences at the economic level as well as at the psychological and mental levels."

The Eritrean agency TesfaNews questioned the bishops' sincerity and interpreted leaked diplomatic cables as evidence that the Archeparch of Asmara "is a certified, anti-government and National service religious leader residing at the helm the capital Asmara".

== See also ==
- Christianity in Eritrea
- Religion in Eritrea
- List of saints from Africa
