= Ethiopian Catholic Church =

Eastern Catholic church

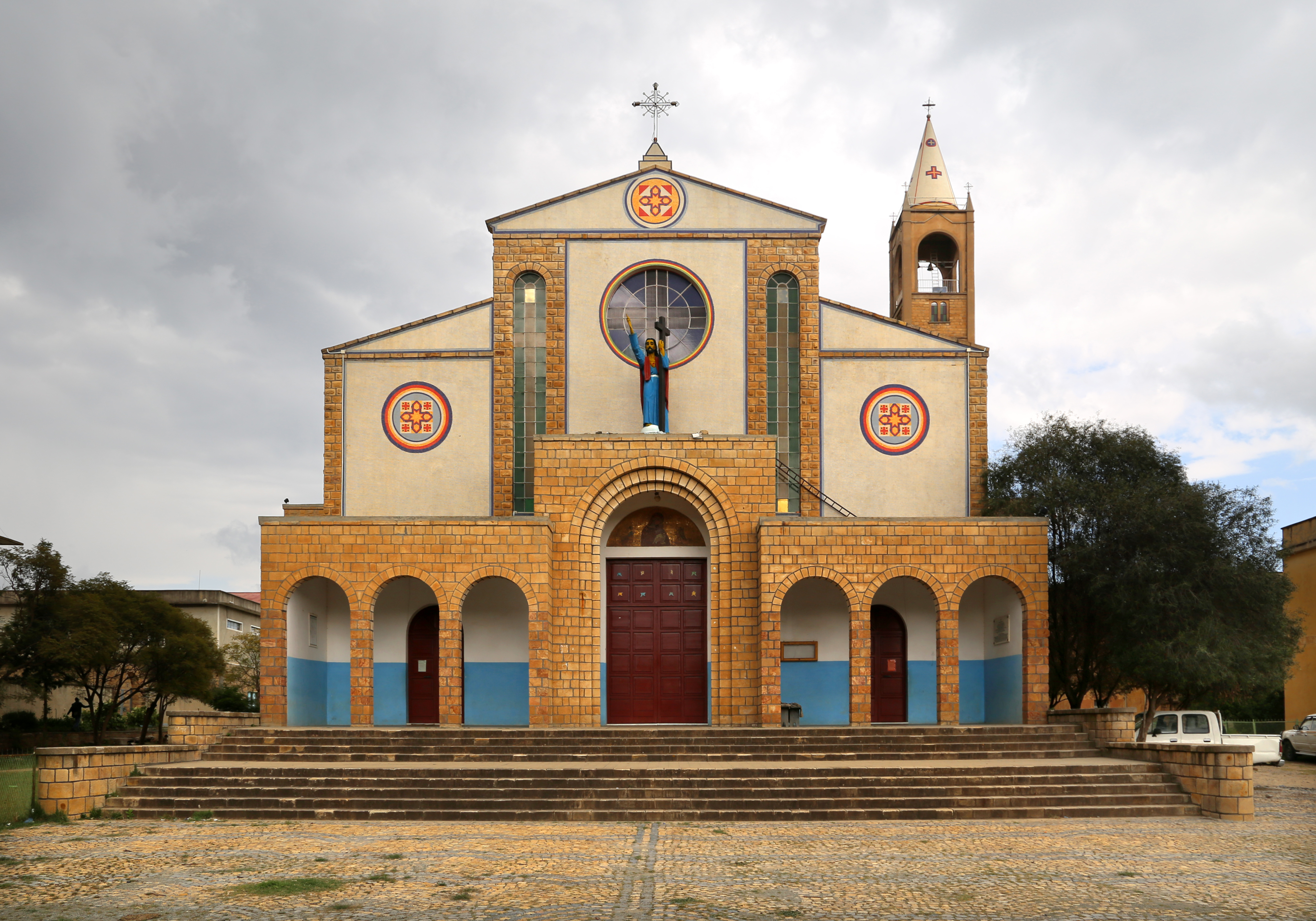
- Cathedral of the Holy Saviour, Adigrat
- Type: Particular church (sui luris)
- Classification: Christian
- Orientation: Eastern Catholic
- Theology: Catholic theology
- Polity: Episcopal
- Governance: Metropolitanate
- Pope: Leo XIV
- Archbishop: Tesfaye Tadesse Gebresilasie
- Region: Ethiopia
- Liturgy: Alexandrian Rite
- Headquarters: Addis Ababa
- Founder: Saint Mark the Evangelist, by tradition
- Congregations: 207 (2010)
- Members: 70,832 (2017)
- Ministers: 590

The Ethiopian Catholic Church is a sui iuris (autonomous) Eastern Catholic church that is based in Ethiopia. As a particular church of the Catholic Church, it is in full communion with the Holy See. Established in 1930, the church is organised under a metropolitan bishop who exercises oversight of a number suffragan dioceses. In its liturgical services, it uses the Alexandrian Rite in the Geʽez language (a local liturgical language).

It holds to the Christological doctrines defined at the Council of Chalcedon and accepts the universal jurisdiction of the pope. These points distinguish it from the Ethiopian Orthodox Tewahedo Church, an Oriental Orthodox church which comprises most Christians in the country.

== History ==
The Portuguese voyages of discovery opened the way for direct contacts between the Catholic Church and the Ethiopian Orthodox Church. In the 15th century, Catholic missionaries arrived in Ethiopia. On 28 August 1439, Pope Eugene IV sent a message of unity with the Catholic Church to Ethiopian Emperor Qostantinos I, but this effort was unsuccessful.

With Islamic attacks up to 1531 threatening Christian Ethiopia, an appeal from the Emperor to the Portuguese brought support to defeat the Adal Sultanate in the Ethiopian–Adal War. Jesuit missionaries came with the Portuguese to Ethiopia. These missionaries focused their conversion activities on the country's governing class, including the emperor, to have the Ethiopian Orthodox Church unite with the Catholic Church. The Emperor Susenyos was converted primarily by Father Pedro Páez. In 1622, Susenyos made Catholicism the state religion. The next year, Pope Gregory XV named Afonso Mendes, a Portuguese Jesuit, patriarch of the Ethiopian Church. A formal union in 1626 was declared when Patriarch Mendes came to the country. With Mendes trying to Latinize the Ethiopian church, Susenyos used force to impose the Latinization. Public backlash resulted. In 1632, Susenyos died. His successor Fasilides in 1636 removed Mendes from the country, ended the union with Rome and removed or killed the remaining missionaries. For the next 200 years, Ethiopia was closed to Catholic missions.

In 1839, Italian Lazarist and Capuchins missionaries arrived, albeit within certain limitations imposed on them due to strong public opposition. That same year, Justin de Jacobis was appointed first Prefect Apostolic of Abyssinia and entrusted with the foundation of Catholic missions in that country. After laboring with great success in Abyssinia for eight years, he was appointed titular Bishop of Nilopolis in 1847, and shortly afterwards Vicar Apostolic of Abyssinia, but he refused the episcopal dignity until it was finally forced upon him in 1849.

In 1919, the Pontifical Ethiopian College was founded within the Vatican walls by Pope Benedict XV, using St. Stephen of the Abyssinians' Church, behind St. Peter's Basilica, as the designated church for the College.

The Latin Church had become established in the south of Ethiopia in areas that had not been Christian and that were incorporated into the modern country only at the end of the 19th century. The Italian occupation of Ethiopia in 1936 gave rise to an increase in the number of Latin-Church jurisdictions, but the expulsion of foreign missionaries at the end of the Second World War meant that the Ethiopic Rite clergy had to take responsibility for areas thus denuded of Catholic clergy. Accordingly, in 1951, the Ethiopic Rite Apostolic Exarchate of Addis Ababa was established, and the ordinariate for Eritrea was elevated to the rank of exarchate. Ten years later, on 20 February 1961, an Ethiopic ecclesiastical province was established, with Addis Ababa as the metropolitan see and Asmara (in Eritrea) and Adigrat (in Ethiopia) as suffragan eparchies.

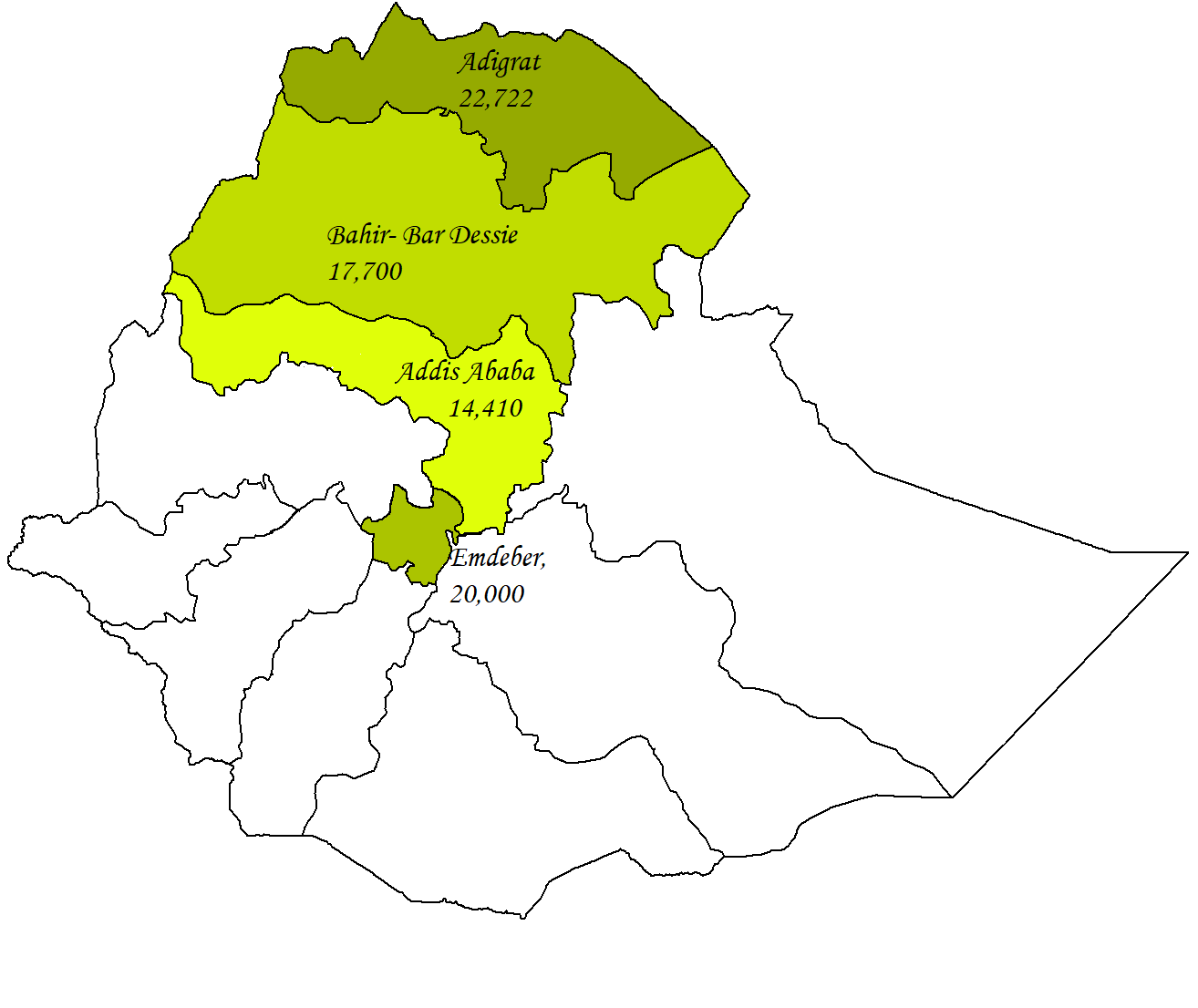
A map of Ethiopian Catholic jurisdictions

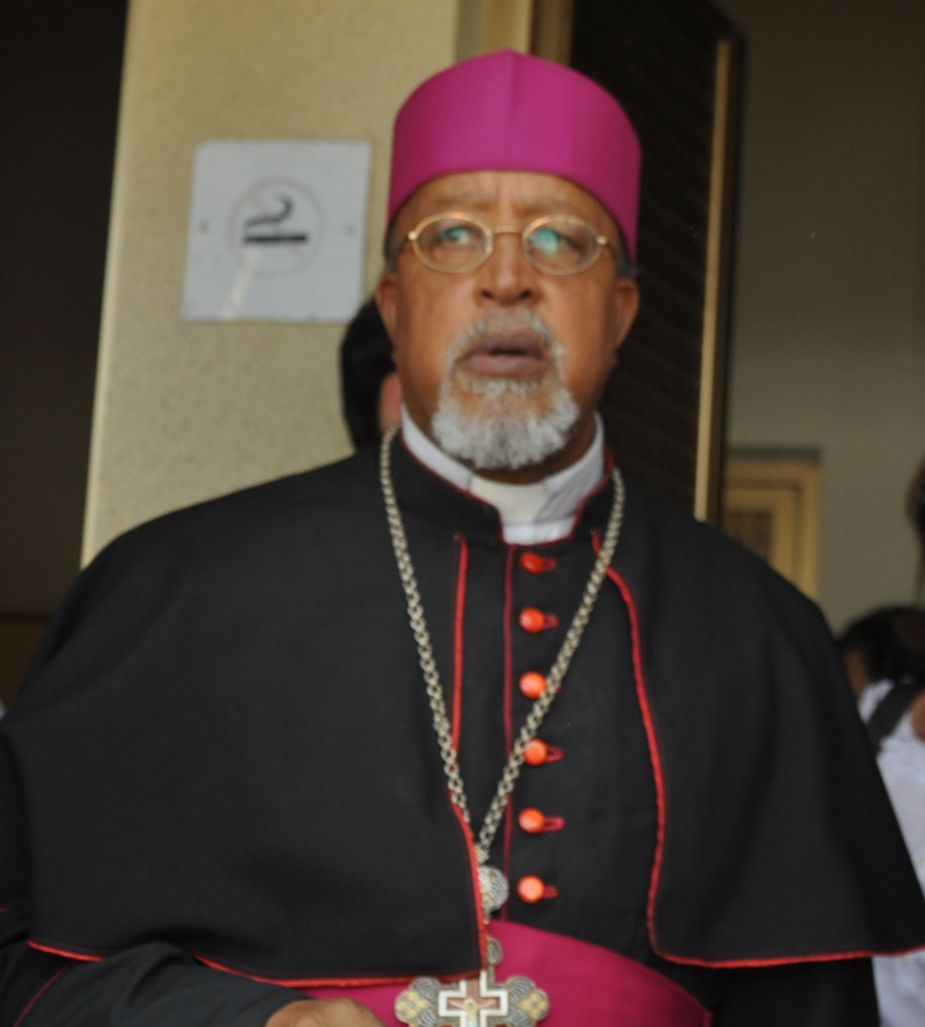
Metropolitan Archbishop of Addis Abeba Berhaneyesus Demerew Souraphiel

In 1995, two new eparchies, Barentu and Keren, were established in Eritrea, and the Latin-Church apostolic vicariate was abolished. Eritrea thus became the only country where all Catholics, whatever Church of their canonical ascription, belong to an Eastern Catholic jurisdiction. In 2003, one more eparchy was created in Endibir in the Southern Nations, Nationalities and Peoples' Region of Ethiopia.

In January 2015 Pope Francis established the Eritrean Catholic Church as a sui iuris Eastern Catholic Church, thus granting it autonomy from the Ethiopian Catholic Church.

There are also Latin Church jurisdictions in the south of Ethiopia, none of them raised to the rank of diocese. Eight are apostolic vicariates and one is an apostolic prefecture.

== Eparchies ==
There are four eparchies (bishoprics) in the country:

- Archeparchy of Addis Abeba (metropolitan see)
- Eparchy of Adigrat
- Eparchy of Bahir Dar–Dessie
- Eparchy of Emdeber

=== Current hierarchy of the Church ===
The present Ethiopian Catholic episcopate (6 hierarchs as per 12 June 2026) is as follows:

Metropolitan archbishop:

- Tesfaye Tadesse Gebresilasie, MCCJ, Metropolitan Archbishop od Addis Abeba (since 2026)

Eparchial bishops:

- Tesfasellassie Medhin, Bishop of Adigrat (since 2001)
- Lisane-Christos Matheos Semahun, Bishop of Bahir Dar-Dessie (since 2010)
- Lukas Teshome Fikre Woldetensae, Bishop of Emdeber (since 2024)

Emeritus hierarchs:

- Cardinal Berhaneyesus Demerew Souraphiel, CM, Metropolitan Archbishop Emeritus of Addis Abeba (since 2026)
- Musie Ghebreghiorghis, OFMCap, Bishop Emeritus of Emdeber (since 2024)

== Differences between the Catholic and Orthodox Ethiopian churches ==
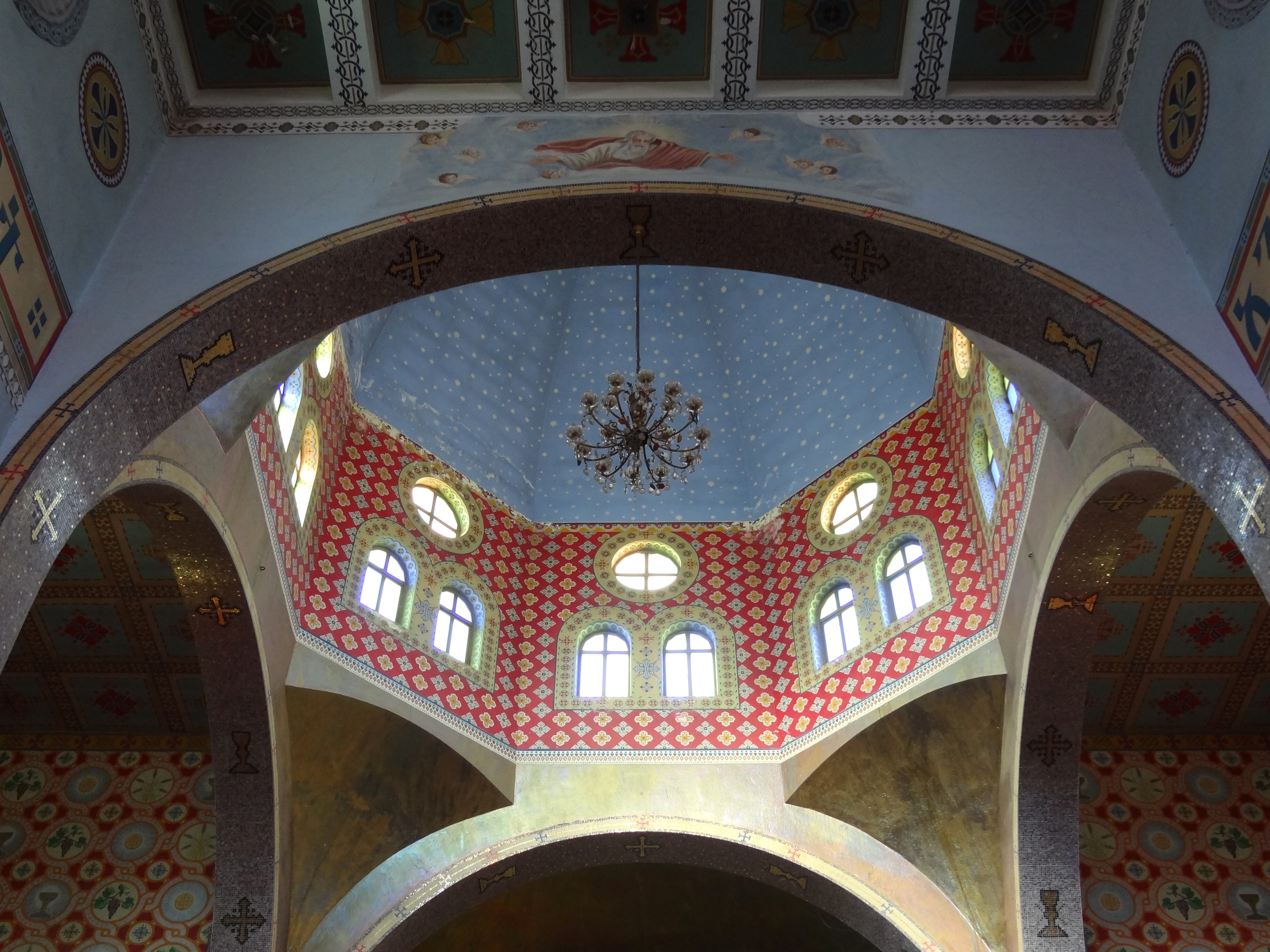
Interior of the Medhani Alem Catholic Church in Adigrat

The Ethiopian Catholic Church is in communion with the Pope. Doctrinal distinctions between the Ethiopian Orthodox Tewahedo Church and the Catholic Ethiopian churches include the latter's recognition of the fifth-century Council of Chalcedon. The order of the diaconate is reserved for adult men in the Catholic Church, but boys are commonly ordained as deacons in the Ethiopian Orthodox Church.

== See also ==
- Christianity in Ethiopia
- Catholic Church in Ethiopia
- Religion in Ethiopia
- List of Catholic dioceses in Ethiopia
