= List of Catholic dioceses in Ethiopia and Eritrea =

The Catholic Church in Ethiopia and Eritrea is joined in a single transnational episcopal conference which, also atypically, includes the Eastern Catholic (Coptic) churches, totaling of two metropolitan archeparchies, six diocesan suffragans (eparchies) and nine pre-diocesan Latin missionary jurisdictions (apostolic vicariates, except one apostolic prefecture).
Each country also has an inter-Catholic national assembly.

- The Latin hierarchy is composed solely of the pre-diocesan missionary jurisdictions in Ethiopia.
- The Eastern Catholics have a Coptic (Alexandrian Rite) particular church sui iuris in each country (both using the Archaic Geez language), each headed by a metropolitan whose ecclesiastical province, covering that nation, is the whole church, with three suffragans each.

Furthermore, there is an Apostolic Nunciature to Ethiopia (papal embassy-level diplomatic representation) in the national capital Addis Abbeba; in it are also vested the Apostolic Nunciatures to Djibouti and to Somalia.
The Apostolic Nunciature to Eritrea is vested in the Apostolic Nunciature to Sudan (in its capital Khartum)

== Current jurisdictions ==
=== Latin Church ===
all missionary and exempt, i.e. directly subject to the Holy See, and in Ethiopia

- Apostolic Vicariate of Awasa
- Apostolic Vicariate of Gambella
- Apostolic Vicariate of Harar
- Apostolic Vicariate of Hosanna
- Apostolic Vicariate of Jimma-Bonga
- Apostolic Vicariate of Meki
- Apostolic Vicariate of Nekemte
- Apostolic Vicariate of Soddo
- Apostolic Prefecture of Robe

=== Ethiopian Catholic Church ===
Forming a single ecclesiastical province, constituting an Eastern Catholic particular church sui iuris using the Alexandrian Rite in the Ge'ez language.

- Metropolitan Archeparchy of Addis Abeba
  - Eparchy of Adigrat
  - Eparchy of Bahir Dar-Dessie
  - Eparchy of Emdeber

=== Eritrean Catholic Church ===
Forming a single ecclesiastical province, constituting an Eastern Catholic particular church sui iuris using the Alexandrian Rite in the Ge'ez language.

- Metropolitan Archeparchy of Asmara
  - Eparchy of Barentu
  - Eparchy of Keren
  - Eparchy of Segheneyti

== Former jurisdictions ==
(only in Ethiopia; not counting the former stages of current jurisdictions)

=== Titular sees ===
- Titular Metropolitan See of Adulis
- Titular Episcopal See of Axomis

=== Suppressed jurisdictions ===
- Latin Patriarchate of Ethiopia
- Apostolic Prefecture of Dessié
- Apostolic Prefecture of Endeber
- Apostolic Prefecture of Gondar

== See also ==
- Christianity in Ethiopia
- Christianity in Eritrea (previously part of Ethiopia)
