= Hailemichael Dejene Hidoto Gamo =

Ethiopian Roman Catholic bishop

The Most Reverend Hailemichael Dejene Hidoto Gamo
- Vicar Apostolic of Soddo
- Church: Catholic Church
- Archdiocese: Immediately subject to the Holy See
- Appointed: 24 June 2024
- Installed: 15 September 2024
- Predecessor: Tsegaye Keneni Derara

Orders
- Ordination: 9 July 2000
- Consecration: 15 September 2024 by Berhaneyesus Demerew Souraphiel

Personal details
- Born: 21 March 1972 (age 54) Sibaye, Ethiopia

Styles of Hailemichael Dejene Hidoto Gamo
- Reference style: His Grace; The Most Reverend
- Spoken style: Your Grace
- Religious style: Bishop

Hailemichael Dejene Hidoto Gamo, O.F.M. Cap (born 21 March 1972) is an Ethiopian Roman Catholic prelate who serves as the Bishop of the Apostolic Vicariate of Soddo since 15 September 2024.

== Background and education ==
He was born on 21 March 1972 in Sibaye, Ethiopia. He took his perpetual vows in 1998, as a member of the Order of Friars Minor Capuchin. He studied at the Saint Francis Capuchin Institute of Philosophy and Theology in Addis Ababa and was ordained a priest on 9 July 2000 in Addis Ababa. He graduated with a Bachelor of Arts in Sociology from the Addis Ababa University. He also holds a Master of Arts in Public Ethics, from Saint Paul University, Ottawa, Ontario, Canada.

== Priest ==
He served as a priest in the Apostolic Vicariate of Soddo, Ethiopia from 2000 until 2024. During that time, he was elevated to the rank of Monsignor. He has also held several leadership positions within the Capuchin family.

Past appointments include as (a) Provincial Vicar of Kidane Meheret for the Capuchin Friars of Ethiopia (b) Guardian of the Fraternity of Konto (c) Director of the Addis Ababa Pascal Technical and Vocational Training Institute and (d) Pastoral Coordinator of the Apostolic Vicariate of Soddo.

== Bishop ==
On 19 June 2024, Pope Francis appointed him as the Bishop (Apostolic Vicar) of the Vicariate of Soddo. Monsignor Gamo took over from Bishop Seyoum Franso Noel, the Apostolic Vicar of Hosanna, Ethiopia, who served as the Apostolic Administrator of the Vicariate of Soddo, between November 2023 and June 2024, following the retirement and resignation of Bishop Tsegaye Keneni Derara, having attained the age 80.

Bishop Hailemichael Dejene Hidoto Gamo, was consecrated as bishop on 15 September 2024 at Soddo by Cardinal Berhaneyesus Demerew Souraphiel, the Archbishop of Addis Ababa, assisted by Bishop Seyoum Franso Noel, Titular Bishop of Eminentiana, Apostolic Vicar of Hosanna and formerly Apostolic Administrator of Soddo and by Bishop Angelo Pagano, Titular Bishop of Ficus.

== See also ==
- Apostolic Vicariate of Soddo

== Succession table ==
Catholic Church titles
Preceded by Tsegaye Keneni Derara (2014–2023)	Apostolic Vicar of Soddo; 2024 - present	Succeeded by Incumbent
