= Kidane-Mariam Teklehaimanot =

- Eparch of Adigrat
- Church: Ethiopian Catholic Church
- Diocese: Eparchy of Adigrat
- In office: 12 October 1984 – 16 November 2001
- Predecessor: Sebhat Leab Worku
- Successor: Tesfasellassie Medhin

Orders
- Ordination: 20 December 1964
- Consecration: 10 February 1985 by Paulos Tzadua

Personal details
- Born: 10 September 1933 Alitena, Colony of Eritrea, Italian Empire
- Died: 2 June 2009 (aged 75)

Kidane-Mariam Teklehaimanot (10 September 1933, Alitena - 2 June 2009) was a bishop of the Ethiopian Catholic Church. He served as the Eparch of Adigrat, in the northern Tigray Region, from his consecration on 12 October 1984, until his retirement on 16 November 2001. He was succeeded by Tesfasellassie Medhin.

Teklehaimanot held the title of Eparch Emeritus until his death on 2 June 2009, at the age of 75.

== Bibliography ==
- Catholic Hierarchy: Bishop Kidane-Mariam Teklehaimanot †
