= Mathara =

Mathara may refer to:

- Mathara in Numidia, an ancient city and present titular see in North Africa
- Matara, Sri Lanka
- Mathara dynasty, a 4th-5th century dynasty of India
