= Rachel (disambiguation) =

Rachel is the second wife of Jacob in the Hebrew Bible.

Rachel may also refer to:

== People ==
- Rachel (given name), a female name (including a list of people and characters with the name)
- Rachel Bluwstein, a Hebrew-language poet often referred to simply as Rachel or Rachel the Poetess
- Rachel Ros, a French singer and representative of France in the Eurovision Song Contest 1964
- Rachel, wife of Rabbi Akiva, a 1st-century CE resident of Judea who is mentioned in the Talmud and Aggadah

== Media and entertainment ==
=== Films ===
- Rachel (2009 film), a documentary about the death of Rachel Corrie
- Rachel (2025 film), an upcoming Indian Malayalam-language revenge thriller film
- Rachel, Rachel, a 1968 film starring Joanne Woodward and directed by Paul Newman

=== Literature ===
- Rachel (play), 1916 play by Angelina Weld Grimké
- Rachel (Animorphs), a character from the Animorphs book series by K. A. Applegate
- Rachel (story), a short story by Erskine Caldwell, included in We Are the Living (1933)
- Rachel, a whaling vessel in the novel Moby-Dick

=== Music ===
- "Rachel" (song), a song by Australian singer Russell Morris
- Rachel's, an American post-rock group

=== Other media and entertainment ===
- Rachel Green, a fictional character on Friends
- Rachel, the lead soprano role in the 1835 opera La Juive
- "Rachel" (Not Going Out), a 2013 television episode

== Places in the United States ==
- Rachel, Nevada, a census-designated place
- Rachel, West Virginia, a census-designated place

== Other uses ==
- Rachel (Gerber), an outdoor bronze sculpture of a piggy bank, Seattle, Washington, U.S.
- Rachel (sandwich), a type of sandwich
- Rachel (sculpture), a 1540s sculpture by Michelangelo
- Rachel Alexandra (foaled 2006), an American Thoroughbred racehorse
- Rachel haircut, a haircut based on the Friends character Rachel Green
- SS Rachel or SS Empire Cabot, a cargo ship
- RACHEL, Software for Raspberry Pi computer (Remote Area Community Hotspot for Education and Learning)
- Student Initiative Rahel, a former initiative in Germany for funding an educational project in Ethiopia

== See also ==
- Rachele (disambiguation)
- Rachal (disambiguation)
