= Ethiopian Catholic Archeparchy of Addis Abeba =

Metropolitan see of the Ethiopian Catholic Church

Metropolitan Archeparchy of Addis Abeba Archieparchia Neanthopolitana
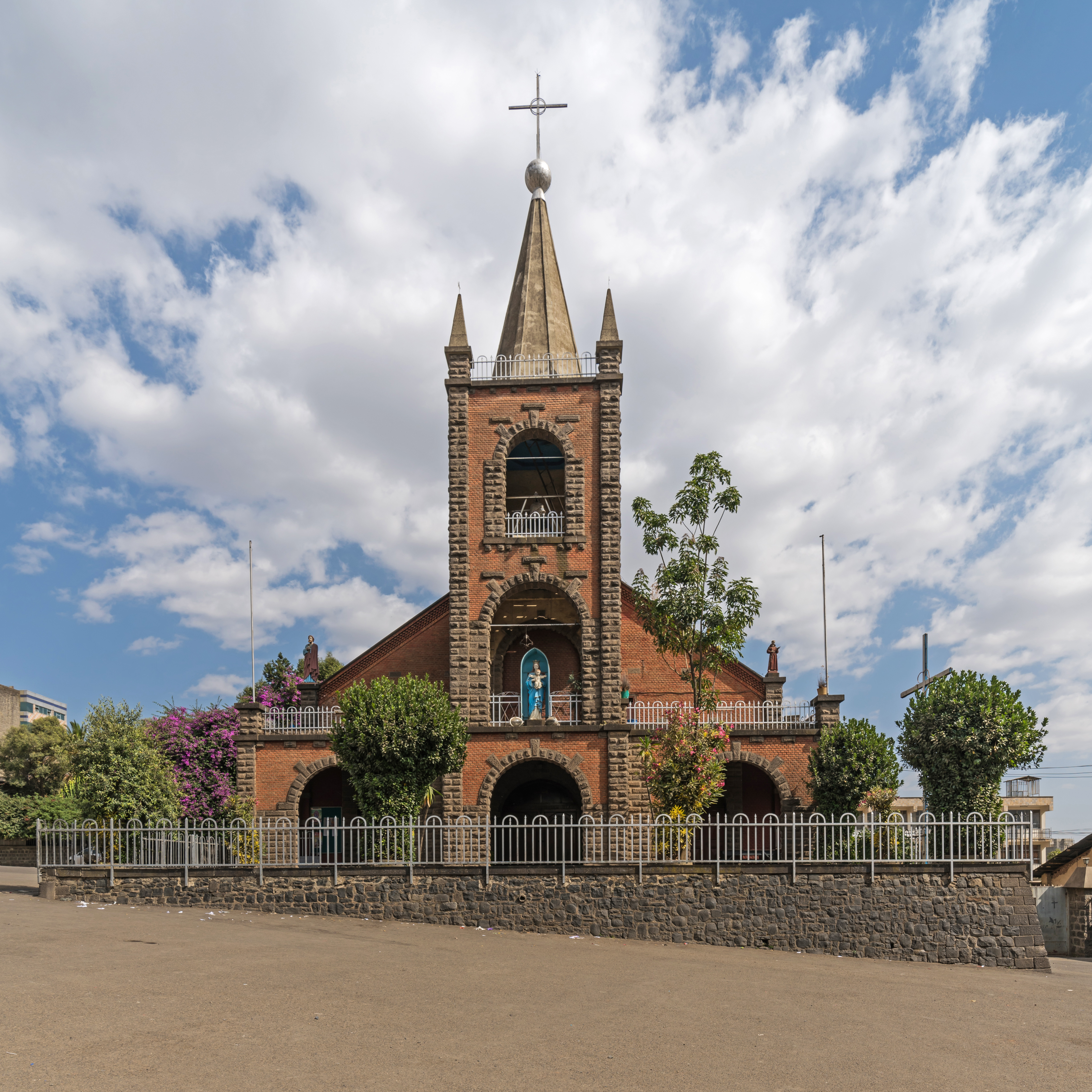
- Nativity of Mary Cathedral, Addis Ababa

Location
- Country: Ethiopia
- Ecclesiastical province: Addis Ababa
- Metropolitan: Cardinal Berhaneyesus Demerew Souraphiel

Statistics
- Area: 31,224 km^{2} (12,056 sq mi)
- Population: Total; Catholics: (as of 2015); 14,844,000; 10,302 (0.1%)

Information
- Denomination: Ethiopian Catholic
- Rite: Ge'ez Rite
- Established: 1961
- Cathedral: Cathedral of Nativity of the Blessed Virgin Mary

Current leadership
- Pope: Leo XIV
- Metropolitan: Tesfaye Tadesse Gebresilasie, MCCJ
- Metropolitan Archbishop: Tesfaye Tadesse Gebresilasie, MCCJ
- Bishops emeritus: Cardinal Berhaneyesus Demerew Souraphiel CM

Map
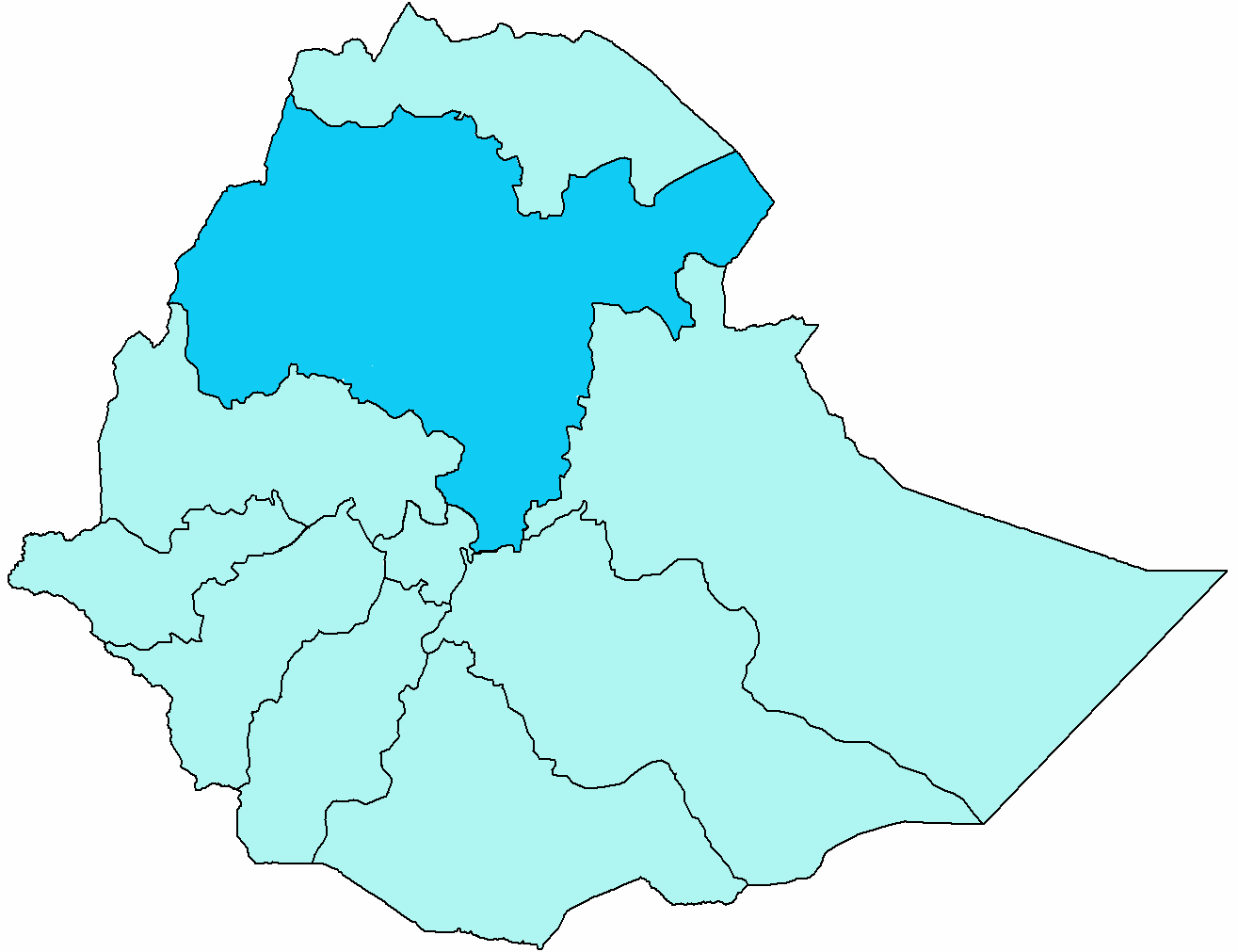

Website
- www.catholicaddis.org

The Ethiopian Catholic Archeparchy of Addis Abeba, officially the Metropolitan sui iuris Archeparchy of Addis Abeba (Latin: Metropolitana sui iuris archieparchia Neanthopolitana) is the metropolitan see of the Ethiopian Catholic Church, a sui iuris metropolitan Eastern Catholic Church.

The cathedral of the see is the Cathedral of the Nativity of the Blessed Virgin Mary, in the national capital Addis Ababa.

It has three suffragan eparchies. Also in Ethiopia are nine Latin jurisdictions (Apostolic Vicariates and Apostolic Prefectures), which, not being of diocesan rank, are not organized as parts of an ecclesiastical province and are instead immediately subject to the Holy See. The Ethiopian Catholic Church reports to the Dicastery for the Eastern Churches, while the Latin jurisdictions depend on the missionary Dicastery for Evangelization. The Catholics in the Latin jurisdictions are about six times as numerous as those in the Ethiopic jurisdictions.

Unlike some other countries, where jurisdictions of the Latin Church and of one or more Eastern Catholic Churches overlap, all ecclesiastical jurisdictions in Ethiopia are geographically distinct and each territory has a single hierarch or ordinary. All the hierarchs and ordinaries are members of the interritual Episcopal Conference, which until the foundation of the Eritrean Catholic Church in 2015 also counted the Eritrean hierarchy as members and, from the 1993 declaration of the independence of Eritrea until 2015, was called the Episcopal Conference of Ethiopia and Eritrea. The episcopal conference is now again named without mention of Eritrea.

The Metropolitan Archeparch of Addis Abeba is Cardinal Berhaneyesus Demerew Souraphiel, who is also president of the episcopal conference.

On November 24, 2024 The Holy Father, Pope Francis, has appointed the Reverend Fr. Tesfaye Tadesse Gebresilasie, M.C.C.J., superior general of the Comboni Missionaries of the Heart of Jesus, as auxiliary bishop of the archeparchy of Addis Ababa, Ethiopia, assigning him the titular see of Cleopatris. He was consecrated on February 2, 2024 at Nativity of Mary Cathedral, Addis Ababa by cardinal brahaneyesus who is the Metropolitan Archbishop of Ethiopian catholic church along with Metropolitan Archbishop Menghesteab Tesfamariam of Eritrea, Asmara and Bishop Abraham Desta, Bishop of the vicariate of Meki.

== Statistics ==
As per 2014, the Metropolitan Archeparchy of Addis Abeba pastorally served 27,713 Catholics (0.1% of Ethiopia's population of 30,302,000 total) on 253,000 km² in 23 parishes and 7 missions with 187 priests (26 diocesan, 161 religious), 494 lay religious (176 brothers, 318 sisters) and 64 seminarians.

== Metropolitan sui iuris Church ==
While patriarchal and major archiepiscopal Eastern Catholic Churches may be structured as provinces, each headed by a metropolitan – the Ukrainian Greek Catholic Church has several, two of them in the United States and Canada – a metropolitan sui iuris Church, such as the Ethiopian Catholic Church, has by definition only a single metropolitan of a fixed see.

The Archeparchy of Addis Abeba is the episcopal see of the single metropolitan of the Ethiopian Catholic Church and has the following suffragan sees, which do not cover the whole of Ethiopia:

- Ethiopian Catholic Eparchy of Adigrat
- Ethiopian Catholic Eparchy of Bahir Dar–Dessie
- Ethiopian Catholic Eparchy of Emdeber

== History ==
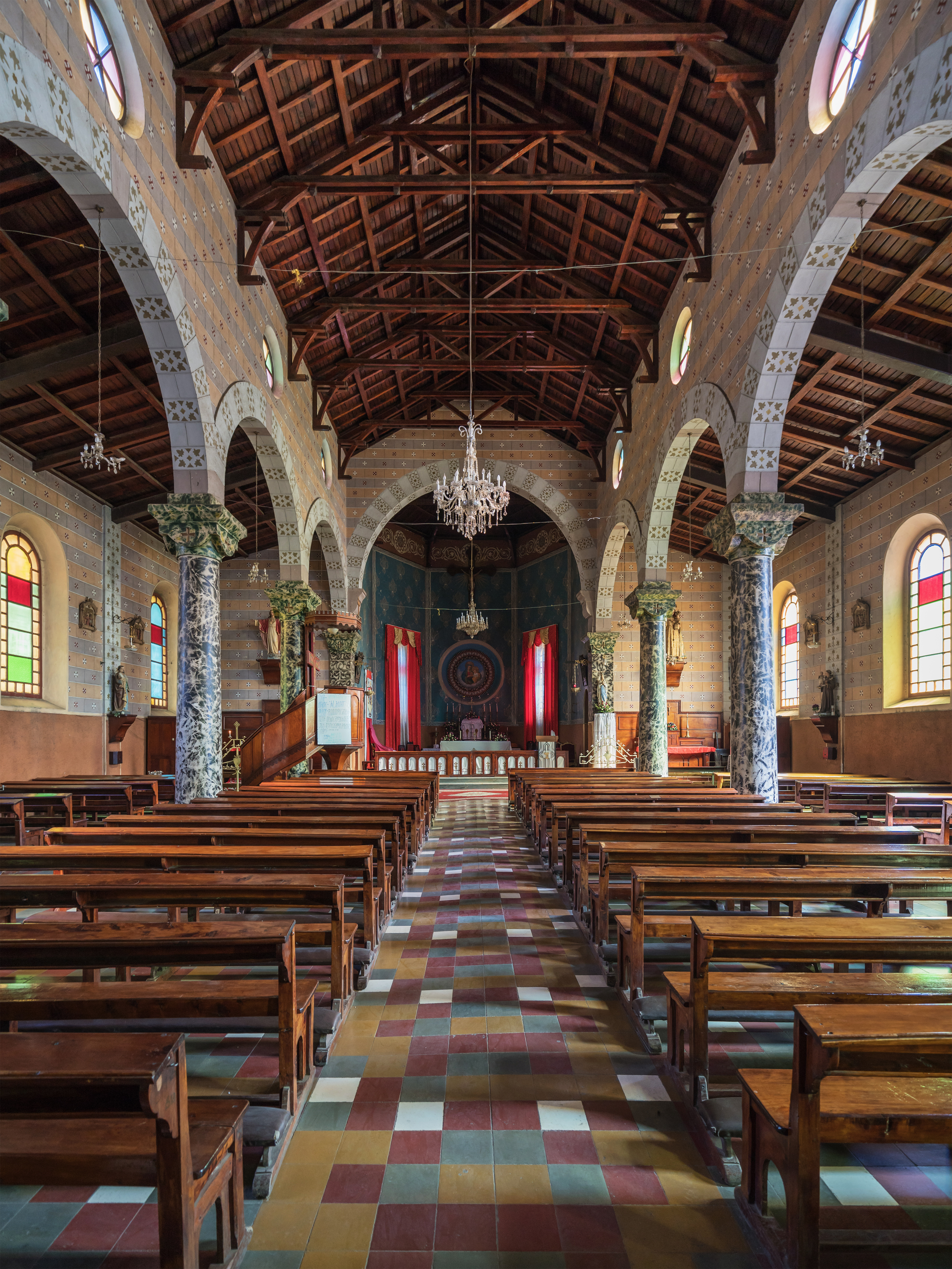
Interior of the Cathedral of the Nativity of Mary, Addis Ababa

=== Apostolic Prefecture/Vicariate of Abyssinia ===
The area now covered by the Archeparchy was part of the huge Latin Catholic Apostolic Prefecture of Abyssinia, when this prefecture was established in 1839 and was at first based at Massawa and then (from 1860) at Keren in Eritrea, before transferring to what is now the north of Ethiopia in 1894. Before 1839, the area of the present Archeparchy and the rest of the territory of the Apostolic Prefecture of Abyssinia belonged to the still vaster Apostolic Vicariate of Syria, Egypt, Arabia and Cyprus.

On 4 May 1846, the Apostolic Prefecture of Abyssinia lost much territory to the south on the establishment of the Apostolic Vicariate of the Galla (see below). Next year, it was raised to the rank of Apostolic Vicariate and therefore given a titular bishop as its head. On 19 September 1894, it lost territory to the north to the new Apostolic Prefecture of Eritrea. The 1847 loss to the Apostolic Vicariate of the Galla involved a vast territory but no established missions; the smaller territory lost in 1894 to the Apostolic Prefecture of Eritrea contained 25 of its 28 parishes. On 25 March 1937, in a general reorganization of Catholic jurisdictions in Ethiopia that followed its military conquest by Italy, the Apostolic Vicariate of Abyssinia was suppressed (see below). A 2008 dossier published by the Fides News Agency of the Congregation for the Evangelization of Peoples spoke of the Eparchy of Adigrat, with 33 parishes and a far smaller territory, as the present-day continuation of the Apostolic Vicariate of Abyssinia.

=== Apostolic Vicariate of the Galla ===
On 4 May 1846, the Apostolic Vicariate of the Galla, headed by Guglielmo Massaia, was founded, extending from 4° to 10° North and from 34° to 44° East. The city of Addis Ababa, founded forty years later, in 1886, is situated at 9°N, 39°E. The site of Addis Ababa was thus in the Apostolic Prefecture of Abyssinia for only seven years and remained 91 years in the Apostolic Vicariate of the Galla.

The Apostolic Vicariate of the Galla lost territory on 28 January 1913 with the creation of the Apostolic Prefecture of Southern Keffa. In 1937, its boundaries were changed and it was renamed Apostolic Vicariate of Harar (see below).

=== Reorganization under Italian rule ===
A year after the Italian conquest of Ethiopia, the Apostolic Vicariate of Abyssinia was suppressed on 25 March 1937. From its territory three new apostolic prefectures were formed (Gondar, Tigray and Dessie), while Danakil was annexed to the (Latin-Church) Apostolic Vicariate of Eritrea.

The territory of the Apostolic Vicariate of the Galla was altered on 25 March 1937 to coincide with that of Harrar Governorate and its name was changed to Apostolic Vicariate of Harar.

A new Apostolic Vicariate of Addis Abeba was created, with territory corresponding to that of Shewa Governorate. Unlike the other vicariates and prefectures, which were placed in the care of missionary institutes, the Addis Abeba jurisdiction was entrusted to its secular clergy.

=== Ethiopic-Rite ordinaries in Ethiopia ===
After the defeat of the Italian forces in the East African Campaign (World War II), clergy of Italian nationality, including the apostolic vicars and prefects, were expelled from Ethiopia. Pastoral care of the Catholics in Ethiopia was attended to by Ethiopian and Eritrean clergy, almost all of whom followed the Ge'ez Rite. Those that came to Addis Ababa were natives of the Apostolic Prefecture of Tigray. Accordingly, at the end of 1942, all the Catholic faithful in Ethiopia were made subject to Kidanè-Maryam Cassà, Titular Bishop of Thibaris, Ordinary for Ethiopic-Rite indigenous Catholics in Eritrea.

In 1950, Hailemariam Kahsay (Italian form: Hailé Mariam Cahsai), a native of the then Apostolic Prefecture of Tigray, which within a decade was to be replaced by the Ethiopian Catholic Eparchy of Adigrat, was made Apostolic Administrator of the Ethiopic-Rite faithful resident in all of Ethiopia, and on 24 February 1951 he was appointed Titular Bishop of Sozusa in Libya.

On 31 October 1951, a new apostolic exarchate for Ethiopic-Rite Catholics (the Eastern equivalent of a Latin apostolic vicariate), to be called that of Addis Abeba, was established, coextensive with the Ethiopian Empire. (Eritrea, then federated with Ethiopia, was not annexed to the Empire until 1960,) This is presented in the Annuario Pontificio as the first origin of today's Metropolitan Archeparchy of Addis Abeba. Hailemariam Kahsay became its first exarch.

On 20 February 1961, the year after Eritrea became part of the Ethiopian Empire, Pope John XXIII established an ecclesiastical province for Ethiopic-Rite Catholics living in the Empire. The apostolic exarchate of Addis Abeba became its metropolitan see and thus an archeparchy. It was given two suffragan eparchies: that of Asmara (previously, like Addis Abeba, an apostolic exarchate) and the eparchy of Adigrat. The jurisdictional area of Addis Abeba was reduced to the territories that had been assigned in 1937 to the Latin apostolic vicariate of Addis Abeba and the apostolic prefectures of Gondar, Dessie and Endeber. From then on, there have been in Ethiopia (excluding Eritrea) no overlapping of Latin and Ethiopic jurisdictions.

On 9 April 1961, Hailemariam Kahsay was appointed the first Eparch of Adigrat, his native area, and his successor in Addis Abeba was Asrate Mariam Yemmeru, transferred from the see of Asmara.

On 25 November 2003, the Eparchy of Emdeber was established on territory taken from the archeparchy as a second Ethiopian suffragan see. By then the Eparchy of Asmara had been divided into four eparchies, so that the suffragan sees of the Archeparchy of Addis Abeba were six.

On 19 January 2015, the number of suffragan sees was reduced to three through, on the one hand, the setting up of a third Ethiopian eparchy, that of Bahir Dar-Dessie, with territory taken from that of the metropolitan archeparchy, and, on the other hand, the separation of the four Eritrean eparchies to form the distinct Eritrean Catholic Church.

== Previous Ordinaries ==
A list of previous ordinaries is below:

Apostolic Prefect of Abyssinia

- Saint Giustino de Jacobis (Justin de Jacobis) (1839.03.10 – 1847 see below)

Apostolic Vicars of Abyssinia

- Saint Giustino de Jacobis (see above 1847 - death 07/31/1860) Titular bishop of Nilopolis(1847.07.06 – 1860.07.31)
- Lorenzo Biancheri (07/31/1860 - death 09/11/1864); Titular Bishop of Lagania (1853.01.28 – 1864.09.11), succeeding as Coadjutor Vicar Apostolic (1853.01.28 – 1860.07.31)
- Louis Bel (7/11/1865 – death 03/01/1868), Titular Bishop of Agathopolis (1865.07.11 – 1868.03.01)
- Jean-Marcel Touvier (09/27/1869 – death 08/04/1888), Titular Bishop of Olena (1869.11.29 – 1888.08.04)
- Jean-Jacques Crouzet (08/01/1886 – 01/16/1896), Titular Bishop of Zephyrium (1888.10.01 – death 1933.01.08); also and longer (last) Apostolic Vicar of Southern Madagascar (Madagascar) (1896.01.16 – 1913.05.20), restyled first Apostolic Vicar of Fort-Dauphin (1913.05.20 – death 1933.01.08)

Apostolic Vicars of the Galla

- Guglielmo Massaia (12/05/1846 – 08/1880) Titular Bishop of Casium (1846.05.12 – 1881.08.02); later Titular Archbishop of Stauropolis (1881.08.02 – 1884.11.10), Cardinal-Priest of Santi Vitale, Valeria, Gervasio e Protasio (1884.11.13 – death 1889.08.06); earlier Apostolic Prefect of Aden (1846.05.12 – 1854)
- Louis-Taurin Cahagne (08/1880 – death 1/9/1899), Titular Bishop of Adramyttium (1873.03.21 – 1899.09.01); previously Coadjutor Apostolic Vicar of the Galla (1873.03.21 – 1880.08)
- André-Marie-Elie Jarosseau (6/04/1900 – 2/09/1937), Titular Bishop of Sauatra (1900.04.06 – death 1941.01.18)
- Leone Giacomo Ossola (22/09/1937 – 19/10/1943), Titular Bishop of Salona (1937.09.22 – 1945.09.09); later Apostolic Administrator of Novara (1943.10.19 – 1945.09.09), Bishop of Novara (1945.09.09 – 1951.06.11) and Titular Archbishop of Hierpiniana (1951.06.11 – death 1951.10.17)

Apostolic Vicar of Addis Abeba

- Giovanni Maria Emilio Castellani (3/25/1937 – 12/13/1945), Titular Archbishop of Perge (1937.03.25 – death 1953.08.30), also Apostolic Delegate (papal representative) for Italian East Africa (1937.03.25 – 1945.12.13); later Apostolic Nuncio (papal ambassador) to El Salvador (1945.12.13 – 1951.09.06) and Apostolic Nuncio to Guatemala (1945.12.13 – retired 1951.09.06); previously Archbishop of Rhodes (insular Greece) (1929.01.15 – 1937.03.25)

== Ethiopic-Rite Ordinaries of Addis Abeba ==
Apostolic Administrator of Catholic faithful resident in Ethiopia

- Kidanè-Maryam Cassà, Titular Bishop of Thibaris and Ordinary for Ethiopic-Rite indigenous Catholics in Eritrea

Apostolic Exarch of Addis Abeba

- Hailemariam Kahsay (2/24/1951 – 02/19/1961), Titular Bishop of Sozusa in Libya (1951.02.24 – 1961.02.19); later first Eparch of Adigrat ((1961.04.09 – 1970.11.24)

Metropolitan Archeparchs of Addis Abeba

- Asrate Mariam Yemmeru (04/09/1961 – retired 02/24/1977), also President of the Episcopal Conference (1967 – 1976); previously Titular Bishop of Urima (1958.02.03 – 1961.04.09) and Apostolic Exarch of Asmara (Eritrea) (1958.02.03 – 1961.04.09); died 1990
- Paulos Tzadua (02/24/1977 – 09/11/1998), created Cardinal-Priest of Santissimo Nome di Maria in Via Latina (1985.05.25 – death 2003.12.11), also President of the Episcopal Conference (1994 – 1998); previously Titular Bishop of Abila in Palæstina (1973.03.01 – 1977.02.24) and Auxiliary Bishop of Addis Abeba (1973.03.01 – 1977.02.24)
- Berhaneyesus Demerew Souraphiel (07.07.1999 – 12.06.2026), President of the Episcopal Conference (1998 – ...), President of Association of Member Episcopal Conferences in Eastern Africa (2014.07.24 – ...), created Cardinal-Priest of San Romano Martire (2015.02.14 [2015.10.18] – ...); previously Apostolic Prefect of (Latin-Church) Jimma–Bonga (1994 – 1997.11.07), Titular Bishop of Bita and Auxiliary Bishop of Addis Abeba (1997.11.07 – 1999.07.07), Apostolic Administrator of Addis Abeba (1998.06.16 – 1999.07.07)
  - Auxiliary Bishop Lisane-Christos Matheos Semahun (2010.01.05 – 2015.01.19), Titular Bishop of Mathara in Numidia (2010.01.05 – 2015.01.19); later first Eparch of Bahir Dar-Dessie (2015.01.19 – ...)
  - Auxiliary Bishop Tesfaye Tadesse Gebresilasie, MCCJ, (6 November 2024 – 12 June 2026)
- Tesfaye Tadesse Gebresilasie, MCCJ, (since 12 June 2026).

== Sources, references and external links ==
- Website of the Ethiopian Catholic Archeparchy of Addis Abeba
- GCatholic with Google satellite photo of cathedral
