= Iucundiana =

Former city and Catholic titular see in Algeria

Icundiana is a former city and bishopric in Roman North Africa which only remains a Latin Catholic titular see.

== History ==
Iucundiana was among the many cities of sufficient importance to become a suffragan diocese in the Roman province of, in the papal sway, but faded so completely, probably during the 7th century rise of Islam, that even its site in modern Algeria remains unclear.

Its only historically documented bishop, Secondinus, participated in the Council of Cabarsussi, called in 393 by the Maximianists, a dissident sect of the schismatic heresy Donatism, and signed its acts, and later attended the Council of Carthage in 411, confronting Catholic (prevailing) and Donatist (condemned) bishops of Roman Africa.

== Titular see ==
The diocese was nominally restored in 1933 as Latin titular bishopric of Jucundiana (Latin, in 1971 'renamed' Iucundiana) / Giocondiana (Curiate Italian)/ Iucundianen(sis) (Latin adjective)

It has had the following incumbents, so far of the fitting Episcopal (lowest) rank :

- Pierre Salmon, Solesmes Congregation (O.S.B.) (1964.06.04 – death 1982.04.24) as emeritate, previously Abbot of Benedictine Abbey of St. Jerome for the Revision and Emendation of the Vulgate (1935 – retired 1965)
- Domenico Crescentino Marinozzi, Capuchin Franciscans (O.F.M. Cap.) (1982.10.15 – death 2024.07.19) as first Apostolic Vicar of Soddo–Hosanna (Ethiopia) (1982.10.15 – retired 2007.01.05) and on emeritate; previously Apostolic Administrator of Apostolic Prefecture of Hosanna (Ethiopia) (1972 – 1977.12.30), (see restyled) first Apostolic Administrator of Apostolic Prefecture of Soddo-Hosanna (Ethiopia) (1977.12.30 – 1979.02.23), succeeding as Apostolic Prefect of Soddo-Hosanna (1979.02.23 – 1982.10.15).
- Mamiarisoa Modeste Randrianifahanana (2025.06.26 – ...) as auxiliary bishop of Antananarivo.

== See also ==
- List of Catholic dioceses in Algeria

== Sources and external links ==
- GCatholic
- Pius Bonifacius Gams, Series episcoporum Ecclesiae Catholicae, Leipzig 1931, p. 466
- Stefano Antonio Morcelli, Africa christiana, Volume I, Brescia 1816, p. 192
- J. Mesnage, L'Afrique chrétienne, Paris 1912, p. 417
