= San Romano =

San Romano most commonly refers to Romanus of Rome in the Italian language.

San Romano may also refer to:

== Places ==
- San Romano in Garfagnana, a municipality in the province of Lucca, Italy
- San Romano, Citerna, a village in the province of Perugia, Italy
- San Romano, Pisa, a village in the province of Pisa, Italy

== Architecture ==
- San Romano Martire, Rome, a Roman Catholic titular church in Rome, Italy
- San Romano, Ferrara, a Roman Catholic church in Ferrara, Italy
- San Romano, Lucca, a Roman Catholic church in Lucca, Italy
