= Lisane-Christos Matheos Semahun =

Ethiopian Catholic bishop (born 1959)

Most Reverend Lisane-Christos Matheos Semahun
- Bishop of Bahir Dar–Dessie
- Church: Ethiopian Catholic Church
- Archdiocese: Addis Ababa
- Diocese: Bahir Dar–Dessie
- Installed: 19 January 2015
- Predecessor: Eparchy erected
- Previous posts: auxiliary bishop of Addis Ababa and titular bishop of Mathara in Numidia (2010–2015)

Orders
- Ordination: 8 May 1988
- Consecration: 18 April 2010 by Berhaneyesus Demerew Souraphiel, Tesfasellassie Medhin and Musie Ghebreghiorghis

Personal details
- Born: 19 December 1959 (age 66) Addis Ababa, Ethiopia
- Education: Pontifical University of Saint Thomas Aquinas

Lisane-Christos Matheos Semahun (born 19 December 1959) is an Ethiopian Catholic hierarch, who has served as the first bishop of the Eparchy of Bahir Dar–Dessie since its establishment in 2015. He previously served as an auxiliary bishop of the Archeparchy of Addis Ababa and titular bishop of Mathara in Numidia from 2010 to 2015.

== Early life and education ==
Lisane-Christos Matheos Semahun was born on 19 December 1959 in Addis Ababa, Ethiopia. After completing his initial seminary formation in his home country, he was sent to Rome for advanced ecclesiastical studies. He attended the Pontifical University of Saint Thomas Aquinas (the Angelicum), where he specialized in Spiritual theology, eventually earning a licentiate.

== Priesthood ==
He was ordained a priest for the Archeparchy of Addis Ababa on 8 May 1988. He served as eparchial chaplain for youth, pastoral coordinator of the archieparchy, and general secretary of the archieparchy's Catholic secretariat. Later he served as protosyncellus of the same archieparchy.

== Episcopacy ==
On 5 January 2010, Pope Benedict XVI appointed him Auxiliary Bishop of Addis Ababa and Titular Bishop of Mathara in Numidia. He received his episcopal consecration on 18 April 2010 from Archbishop Berhaneyesus Demerew Souraphiel, assisted by Bishops Tesfasellassie Medhin and Musie Ghebreghiorghis.

On 19 January 2015, Pope Francis established the Eparchy of Bahir Dar–Dessie from territory detached from the Archeparchy of Addis Ababa and appointed Matheos Semahun as its first bishop.

== Pastoral work ==
His tenure has been marked by significant humanitarian challenges due to regional instability and conflict in northern Ethiopia. He has been a prominent voice in advocating for internally displaced persons (IDPs) within his eparchy, coordinating solidarity efforts and providing spiritual and material support to those affected by violence. In various pastoral letters, he has highlighted the resilience of the local Catholic community amidst the scarcity of resources and the ongoing need for international assistance to maintain schools and health centers.
