= Elephantaria =

Elephantaria may refer to:

- Elephantaria in Mauretania, a Roman town
- Elephantaria in Proconsulari, a Roman town
- Elephantaria (genus), a prehistoric hexacoral genus
