= Tesfaye Tadesse Gebresilasie =

Ethiopian Roman Catholic prelate (born 1969)

The Most Reverend Tesfaye Tadesse Gebresilasie MCCJ
- Archbishop of Addis Abeba
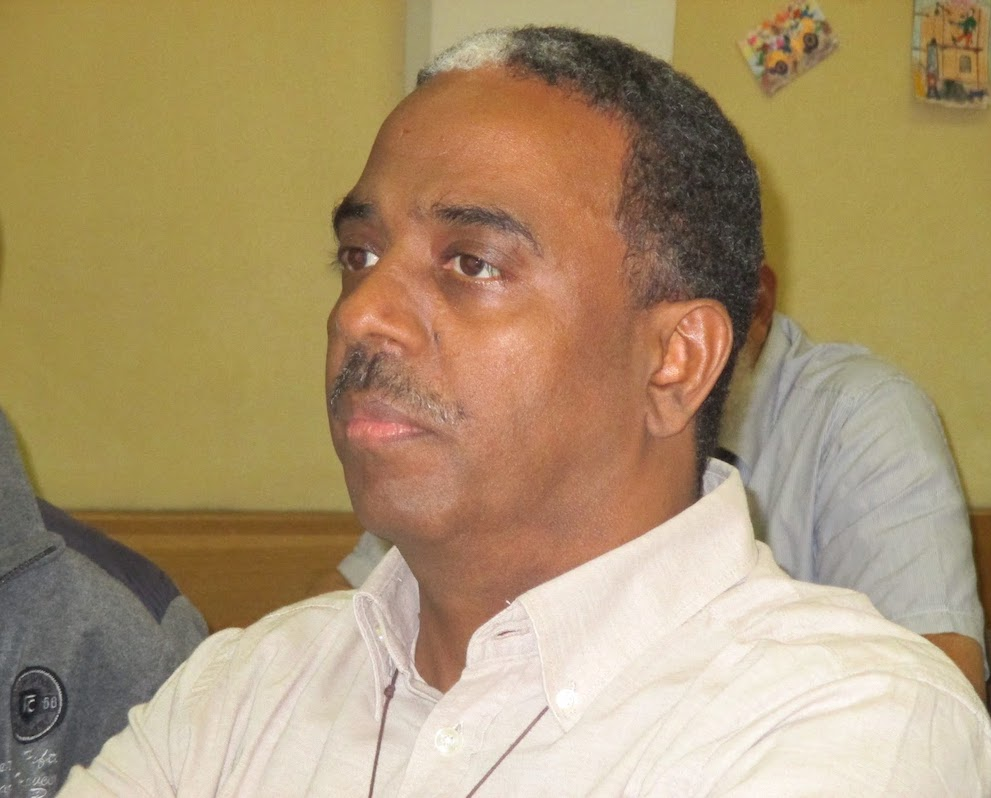
- Church: Catholic Church
- Archdiocese: Ethiopian Catholic Archeparchy of Addis Abeba
- See: Addis Abeba (Ethiopian)
- Installed: 12 June 2026
- Predecessor: Berhaneyesus Demerew Souraphiel
- Previous posts: Titular Bishop of Cleopatris and Auxiliary Bishop of Addis Abeba (2024–2026)

Orders
- Ordination: 26 August 1995
- Consecration: 2 February 2025 by Cardinal Berhaneyesus Demerew Souraphiel
- Rank: Archbishop

Personal details
- Born: Tesfaye Tadesse Gebresilasie; 22 September 1969 (age 56) Harar, Harari Region, Ethiopia

Styles of Tesfaye Tadesse Gebresilasie
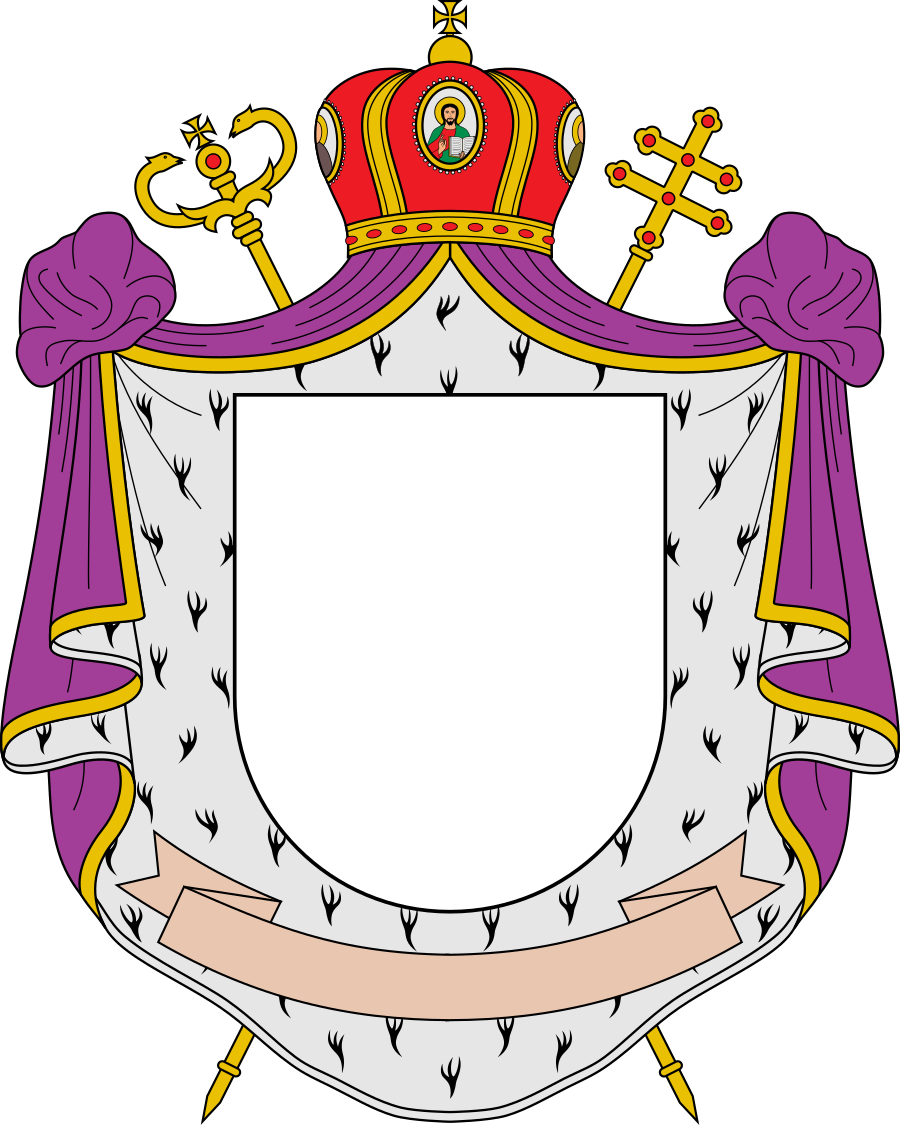
- Reference style: His Eminence; The Most Reverend
- Spoken style: Your Eminence
- Religious style: Archbishop

Tesfaye Tadesse Gebresilasie, MCCJ (born on 22 September 1969) is an Ethiopian Catholic prelate who has served as Archbishop of Addis Abeba and head of the Ethiopian Catholic Church since 2026. Previously he served as an auxiliary bishop for the Archeparchy of Addis Abeba from 2024 to 2026. He is a member of the Comboni Missionaries.

== Background and education ==
He was born on 22 September 1969 in Harar, Harari Region, Ethiopia. In 1986, he became a member of the Comboni Missionaries of the Heart of Jesus. He took his perpetual vows of the Comboni Missionaries on 1 November 1994. He was ordained a priest of that religious order on 26 August 1995.

He studied theology at the Pontifical Gregorian University, in Rome, Italy. He then studied at the Pontifical Institute for Arabic and Islamic Studies, also in Rome, Italy, where he earned a Licentiate in Arabic and Islamic Studies in 2001. He undertook advanced studies in the Arabic language at the Dar Comboni Institute for Arabic Studies in Cairo, Egypt.

== Priest ==
On 1 November 1994 he took his perpetual vows as a Comboni Missionary. He was ordained a priest of the Order of the Comboni Missionaries of the Heart of Jesus on 26 August 1995 at Addis Ababa in the Ethiopian Catholic Archeparchy of Addis Abeba, in Ethiopia.

As a priest, he served in various roles in different locations, including as:

- Provincial Superior of the Combonian Missionaries in Ethiopia since 2005.
- President of the Conference of Major Religious Superiors of Ethiopia since 2005.
- Member of the General Councilor, Comboni Missionaries in Ethiopia since 2009.
- Coordinator of the Confederation of Conferences of Superiors and Major Superiors of Africa and Madagascar since 2013.
- Superior General of the Comboni Missionaries of the Heart of Jesus, elected in 2015 and re-elected in 2022. Served in that capacity until 6 November 2024.

== Bishop ==
On 6 November 2024, Pope Francis appointed Reverend Tesfaye Tadesse Gebresilasie as Auxiliary Bishop of the Ethiopian Catholic Archeparchy of Addis Abeba, Ethiopia, and a Titular Bishop of Cleopatris. He was consecrated and installed there on 2 February 2025 at the Nativity of the Blessed Virgin Mary, in Addis Ababa. The Principal Consecrator was Cardinal Berhaneyesus Demerew Souraphiel, Archbishop of Addis Ababa assisted by Archbishop Menghesteab Tesfamariam, Archbishop of Asmara (Eritrean), and Bishop Abraham Desta, Titular Bishop of Horrea Aninici. He was contemporaneously consecrated as Titular Bishop of Cleopatris.

On 12 June 2026, Pope Leo XIV accepted the resignation from the pastoral care of the Metropolitan Archeparchy of Addis Ababa, presented by Cardinal Berhaneyesus Demerew Souraphiel, C.M. Concurrently, he appointed Gebresilasie, who has been serving as the auxiliary bishop of the same see, as the new Metropolitan Archbishop of Addis Ababa and head of the Ethiopian Catholic Church.

== See also ==
- Catholic Church in Ethiopia

== Succession table ==
Catholic Church titles
| Preceded by Berhaneyesus Demerew Souraphiel | Archbishop of Addis Ababa (since 12 June 2026) | Succeeded by Incumbent |
