= Angelo Moreschi =

Italian bishop

Angelo Moreschi S.D.B.
- Vicar Apostolic of Gambella
- Church: Catholic Church
- See: Apostolic Vicariate of Gambella
- In office: 20 November 2000 – 25 March 2020
- Predecessor: Prefecture established
- Successor: Roberto Bergamaschi
- Other post: Titular Bishop of Elephantaria in Mauretania (2009-2020)

Orders
- Ordination: 2 October 1982 by Armido Gasparini
- Consecration: 31 January 2010 by Berhaneyesus Demerew Souraphiel

Personal details
- Born: 13 June 1952 Nave, Lombardy, Italy
- Died: 25 March 2020 (aged 67) Brescia, Lombardy, Italy

Angelo Moreschi S.D.B. (13 June 1952 – 25 March 2020) was an Italian missionary of the Catholic Church who spent his career in Ethiopia. He was prefect apostolic of Gambella, and became vicar apostolic there when he became a bishop in 2010.

== Biography ==
Moreschi was born in Nave, Italy, on 13 June 1952. He took his first vows as a member of the Salesians of Don Bosco on 1 September 1974 and his final vows on 15 August 1980. He attended seminary in Chiari and studied theology in Bethlehem. He was ordained a priest on 2 October 1982.

He spent his career in Ethiopia, where he was Provincial Councilor for the Vice-Province Africa Ethiopia-Eritrea from 1998 to 2001 and pastor in Dilla, South Ethiopia, from 1991 to 2000. On 25 November 2000, Pope John Paul II named him the first Prefect of Gambella, Ethiopia. On 5 December 2009, Pope Benedict XVI named him Apostolic Vicar of the newly created Apostolic Vicariate of Gambella and titular bishop of Elephantaria in Mauretania. He received his episcopal consecration on 31 January 2010.

Moreschi had diabetes and underwent a foot amputation. He was in Italy for treatment and was undergoing dialysis when he developed a fever and respiratory problems around 19 March. He was briefly hospitalized, and died at the Salesian seminary in Brescia, Italy, on 25 March 2020 from COVID-19.
