= Domenico Crescentino Marinozzi =

Italian Roman Catholic priest (1926–2024)

Domenico Crescentino Marinozzi, OFMCap, (21 November 1926 – 19 July 2024) was an Italian Roman Catholic Capuchin priest, missionary, and member of the Order of Friars Minor Capuchin. He served as the Prefect Apostolic and Vicar Apostolic of the Apostolic Vicariate of Soddo, in Soddo, Wolayita Zone, Ethiopia, from 1972 until 2007.

Marinozzi was born on 21 November 1926 in San Severino Marche as one of six children - three brothers and three sisters - of Raffaele and Felice Marinozzi. He was raised in San Severino Marche before entering the Order of Friars Minor Capuchin and taking the monastic name, Friar Crescentino beginning in 1943. Marinozzi was ordained a Catholic priest in 1948. He studied the French and German languages in Switzerland and later received a degree in philosophy. Marinozzi returned to Italy and worked as a teacher.

In 1972, Marinozzi was appointed Prefect Apostolic of the Apostolic Vicariate of Soddo, an apostolic vicariate located in the Wolayita Zone of southern Ethiopia. He served, first as Prefect Apostolic and then as the Vicar Apostolic of Soddo from 1972 until his retirement in 2007, with his official consecration in 1982. He lived and worked from the city of Soddo during this period.

Marinozzi returned to Italy in 2008 and lived in Loreto, Marche. He died on 19 July 2024, at the age of 97. His funeral was held at the Basilica della Santa Casa in Loreto.
