= Rachals =

Rachals is a surname. Notable people with the surname include:

- Otto Rachals (1897–1984), former mayor of Green Bay, Wisconsin
- Terri Rachals (born 1966), former nurse who was accused of killing six people at Phoebe Putney Memorial Hospital in Albany, Georgia

== See also ==
- Rachal (surname)
