= Varghese Thottamkara =

His Excellency, The Most Reverend Varghese Thottamkara C.M.
- Vicar Apostolic of Nekemte
- Installed: 10 Nov 2013
- Predecessor: Bishop Theo Van Ruijvven C.M.
- Successor: Incumbent

Orders
- Ordination: 10 May 1986
- Consecration: 13 August 2013 by Luca Brandolini

Personal details
- Born: 2 June 1959 (age 67) Thottuva Kerala India
- Denomination: Syro-Malabar
- Education: Pontifical University of Saint Thomas Aquinas

Bishop Varghese Thottamkara, C.M. is the serving Vicar Apostolic of Nekemte, Ethiopia.

== Early life ==
He was born on 2 June 1959 in Thottuva, Ernakulam, Kerala, India.

== Education ==
In 1998 he acquired Licentiate of Sacred Theology in Moral theology from Pontifical University of Saint Thomas Aquinas.

== Priesthood ==
On 10 May 1986 he became a member of the Congregation of the Mission. He was Ordained a Priest in the Congregation of the Mission by Antony Padiyara on 6 January 1987. He served as Parish Priest for Muniguda and Allada in Roman Catholic Diocese of Berhampur, Orissa, India from 1988 to 1990. From year 1990 to 1993 he served minor seminary of Ambo, Ethiopia as a vice rector. From 1993 to 1995 he held the office of the rector and professor at Vincentian major seminary in Addis Ababa, Ethiopia.

== Episcopate ==
He was Appointed Coadjutor Vicar Apostolic of Nekemte, Ethiopia, and Titular Bishop of Chullu on 28 June 2013. He was Ordained a Bishop by Luca Brandolini on 13 August 2013. He Succeeded Bishop Theo Van Ruijvven C.M. as Vicar Apostolic of Nekemte, Ethiopia on 10 November 2013.
