= Rachele =

Rachele may refer to:

== People ==
=== Given name ===
- Rachele (given name), a feminine given name (including a list of people with the name)

=== Surname ===
- Josh Rachele (born 2003), Australian rules footballer
- Sara Rachele (born 1988), American folk singer

== Other ==
- 674 Rachele, a minor planet orbiting the Sun
- Villa Rachele, a district of Cinisello Balsamo in Italy

== See also ==
- Rachel (disambiguation)
- Rachal (disambiguation)
