= Ethiopian Catholic Eparchy of Bahir Dar–Dessie =

Eastern Catholic eparchy in Ethiopia

Coordinates: 11.6000°N 37.3833°E

Eparchy of Bahir Dar–Dessie Eparchia Bahirdardessiensis

Location
- Country: Ethiopia
- Ecclesiastical province: Addis Ababa

Statistics
- Area: 221,776 km^{2} (85,628 sq mi)
- Population: Total; Catholics: (as of 2015); 16,215,850; 17,544 (0.1%)

Information
- Denomination: Ethiopian Catholic Church
- Rite: Alexandrian Rite
- Established: 19 January 2015 (11 years ago)
- Cathedral: Cathedral of Egziabher Ab

Current leadership
- Pope: Leo XIV
- Bishop: Lisane-Christos Matheos Semahun

The Ethiopian Catholic Eparchy of Bahir Dar–Dessie (Bahir Dar–Dessie of the Ethiopics) is one of the three suffragan eparchies (Eastern Catholic dioceses) in the ecclesiastical province (covering all Ethiopia) of the Metropolitan Ethiopian Catholic Archeparchy of Addis Abeba, which comprises the entire Ethiopian Catholic Church sui iuris, which practices the Alexandrian Rite in the liturgical Ge'ez language.
Yet it depends on the missionary Roman Congregation for the Oriental Churches.

Despite the eparchy's double name, also mentioning Dessie (another Amhara city in northern Ethiopia), the diocese has its sole cathedral eparchial (episcopal) see in the Cathedral of Egziabher Ab, in Bahir Dar.

The Eparchy of Bahir Dar – Dessie comprises 8 Zones of Amhara Regional State:

1. North Gondar
2. South Gondar
3. East Gojam
4. West Gojam
5. Agew Awi
6. Wag Hemra
7. North Wello
8. South Wello

The Special Oromia Zone

1 Zone of Benishangul Gumuz Regional State:

1. Metekel Zone

3 Zones of Afar Regional State:

1. Zone 1
2. Zone 4
3. Zone 5

== History ==
It was established on 19 January 2015 as Eparchy (Diocese) of Bahir Dar–Dessie, on territory split off from its Metropolitan archdiocese, Ethiopian Catholic Archeparchy of Addis Abeba, where its first Eparch had been auxiliary bishop before his appointment (aged 55) to the newly created see.

== Statistics ==
As per 2015, it pastorally served 17,544 Catholics (0.1% of 16,215,850 total) on 221,766 km^{2} in 24 parishes and 53 missions with 24 priests (3 diocesan, 21 religious), 47 lay religious (4 brothers, 43 sisters).

== Episcopal ordinaries ==
(all Ethiopic Rite)

Suffragan Eparchs (Bishops) of Bahir Dar–Dessie

- Lisane-Christos Matheos Semahun (2015.01.19 – ...); previously Titular Bishop of Mathara in Numidia (2010.01.05 – 2015.01.19) as Auxiliary Bishop of mother see Addis Abeba of the Ethiopics (Ethiopia) (2010.01.05 – 2015.01.19).

== See also ==
- Catholic Church in Ethiopia
- List of Catholic dioceses in Ethiopia

== Sources and external links ==
- GCatholic, with Google satellite photo
