= Rachal (surname) =

Rachal is a surname. Notable people with the surname include:

- Chilo Rachal (born 1986), American football player
- Latario Rachal (born 1974), American football player

== See also ==
- Rachals (surname)
- Rachal (disambiguation)
- Rachel (given name)
