= Mamiarisoa Modeste Randrianifahanana =

Madagascan Catholic prelate (born 1967)

The Most Reverend Mamiarisoa Modeste Randrianifahanana
- Auxiliary Bishop of Antananarivo, Madagascar
- Church: Catholic Church
- Archdiocese: Roman Catholic Archdiocese of Antananarivo
- See: Antananarivo
- Appointed: 26 June 2025
- Installed: 21 September 2025

Orders
- Ordination: 6 September 1997 by Armand Gaétan Razafindratandra
- Consecration: 21 September 2025 by Jean de Dieu Raoelison
- Rank: Bishop

Personal details
- Born: Mamiarisoa Modeste Randrianifahanana; 18 June 1967 (age 58) Fiakarana, Archdiocese of Antananarivo, Analamanga, Madagascar

Styles of Mamiarisoa Modeste Randrianifahanana
- Reference style: Your Lordship; The Most Reverend
- Spoken style: His Lordship
- Religious style: Bishop

Mamiarisoa Modeste Randrianifahanana (born 18 June 1967) is a Madagascan Catholic prelate who serves as Auxiliary Bishop of the Roman Catholic Diocese of Antananarivo, in Madagascar. He was appointed to that position on 26 Jun 2025 by Pope Leo XIV. He was installed at Antananarivo on 21 September 2025. Before that, from 6 September 1997 until 26 June 2025, he was a priest of the same Catholic archdiocese. He was concurrently assigned the title of Titular Bishop of Iucundiana. He was consecrated at Anananarivo on 21 September 2025 by the hands of Jean de Dieu Raoelison, Archbmishop of Antananarivo Archdiocese.

== Background and education ==
He was born on 18 June 1967 in Fiakarana, Archdiocese of Antananarivo, Analamanga, Madagascar. He studied philosophy at the Antsirabe Major Seminary in Antsirabe. He then studied theology at the Ambatoroka Major Seminary in Antananarivo.

== Priest ==
He was ordained a deacon for the Archdiocese of Antananarivo on 7 August 1996. On 6 September 1997, he was ordained a priest for the same Apostolic See. on both occasions, the Ordinator was Cardinal Armand Gaétan Razafindratandra, Archbishop of Antananarivo. Father Mamiarisoa Modeste Randrianifahanana served as a priest until 26 June 2025. While a priest, he served in various roles and locations, including:

- Head of liturgy from 1997 until 2003.
- Chaplain of the Youth Eucharistic Movement from 1997 until 2003.
- Rector of the Antananarivo Preparatory Seminary from 1998 until 2003.
- Fidei donum priest in La Réunion from 2003 until 2017.
- Parish priest of the missionary district of Ambatolampy from 2017 until 2020.
- Lecturer at Antsirabe Major Seminary from 2020 until 2023.
- Vicar General of the Archdiocese of Antananarivo from 2023 until 2025.

== Bishop ==
On 26 June 2025, Pope Leo XIV appointed him auxiliary bishop of the Ecclesiastical Metropolitan Province of Antananarivo. The Holy Father concurrently appointed him Titular Bishop of Iucundiana.

He was consecrated bishop at Antananarivo on 21 September 2025 by Jean de Dieu Raoelison, Archbishop of Antananarivo assisted by Cardinal Désiré Tsarahazana, Archbishop of Toamasina and Tomasz Grysa, Titular Archbishop of Rubicon.

== See also ==
- Catholic Church in Madagascar

== Succession table ==
Catholic Church titles
Preceded by	Auxiliary Bishop of Port Antananarivo (since 26 June 2025)	Succeeded by
