= Apostolic Vicariate of Gambella =

Catholic missionary jurisdiction in Ethiopia

Apostolic Vicariate of Gambella Vicariatus Apostolicus Gambellensis

Location
- Country: Ethiopia
- Metropolitan: Immediately subject to the Holy See
- Headquarters: Gambela, Gambela Region, Ethiopia

Statistics
- Area: 50,000 km^{2} (19,000 sq mi)
- Population: Total; Catholics: (as of 2024); 1,200,000; 38,000 (3.2%)
- Parishes: 14

Information
- Denomination: Catholic Church
- Sui iuris church: Latin Church
- Rite: Roman Rite
- Established: 16 November 2000; 26 years ago
- Cathedral: St. Joseph Cathedral in Gambela
- Secular priests: 19 (14 Diocesan, 5 Religious Orders)

Current leadership
- Pope: Leo XIV
- Apostolic Vicar: Roberto Bergamaschi, S.D.B.
- Coadjutor: Hailemariam Medhin Tesfay, S.D.B.

Map
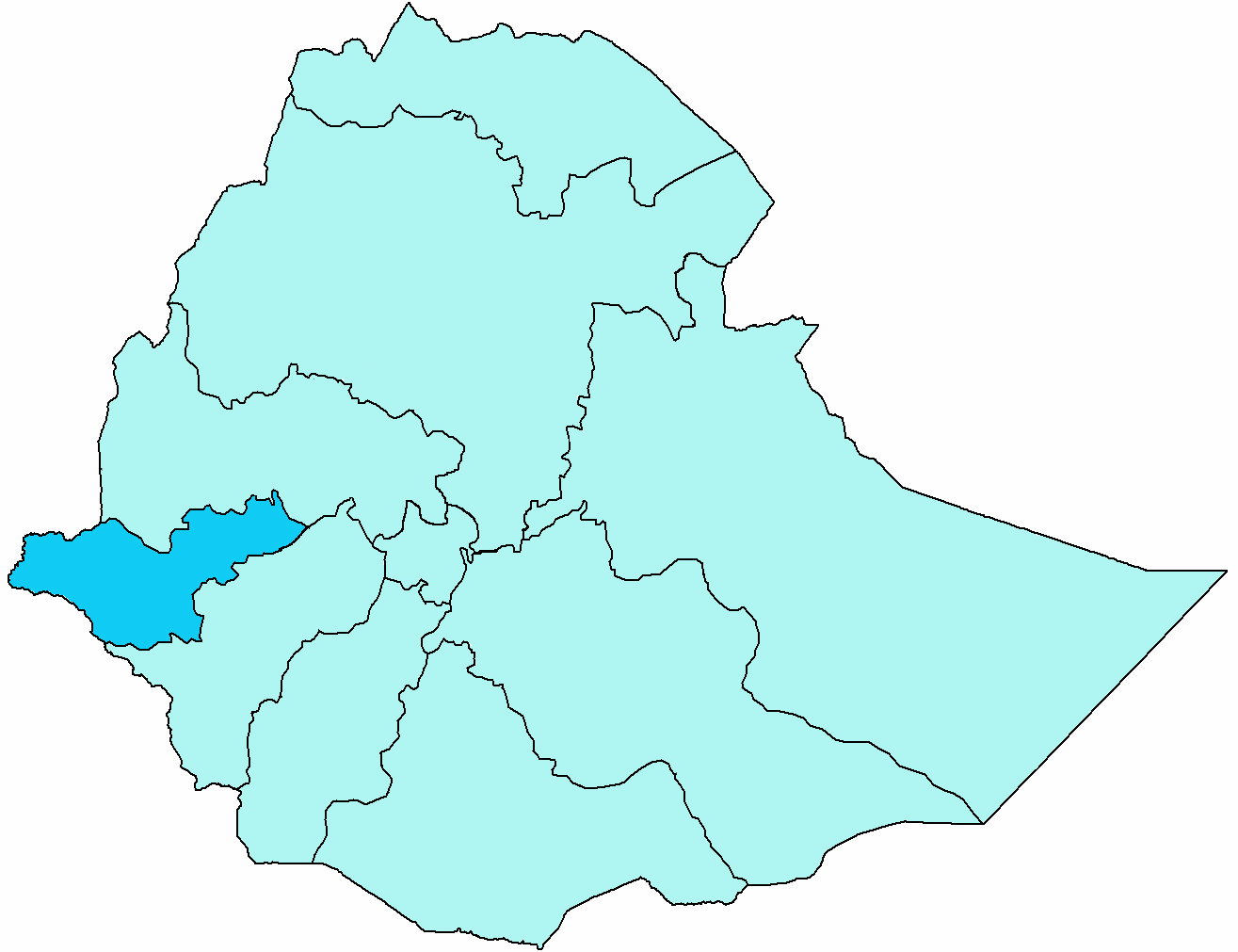

The Apostolic Vicariate of Gambella (Latin: Vicariatus Apostolicus Gambellensis) (formerly the Apostolic Prefecture of Gambella) is a Catholic missionary pre-diocesan jurisdiction (known as an apostolic vicariate) in the western part of Ethiopia.

It is exempt, i.e. immediately dependent upon the Holy See (notably the Roman Congregation for the Evangelization of Peoples), not part of any ecclesiastical province (such as the Metropolitan Archbishopric of Addis Abbeba).

Its cathedral episcopal see is the St. Joseph Cathedral, in Gambela.

The Apostolic Vicariate of Gambella comprises all the Gambella Region and large part of Illubabor Zone in Oromia Region.

== History ==
On 16 November 2000 it was established as Apostolic prefecture of Gambella, on territory split-off from the Apostolic Prefecture of Jimma–Bonga, the only other one in Ethiopia observing the Roman rite (like all five Apostolic vicariates in the predominantly Coptic country).

On 5 December 2009 it was promoted an apostolic vicariate, since entitled to a titular bishop.

== Leadership ==
(Roman Rite)

=== Apostolic Prefect of Gambella ===
- Angelo Moreschi, S.D.B. (16 November 2000 – 5 December 2009 see below)

=== Apostolic Vicars of Gambella ===
- Angelo Moreschi, S.D.B. (see above 5 December 2009 – 25 March 2020)
- Roberto Bergamaschi, S.D.B (29 September 2020 – Present)

=== Coadjutor Bishop ===
- Hailemariam Medhin Tesfay, S.D.B. (2026-Present)

== See also ==
- Roman Catholicism in Ethiopia

== Sources and external links ==
- GCatholic.org with incumbent bio links
- map of the Ethiopian church on its website
