= Rachal =

Rachal may refer to:

- Kabak tatlısı, a Turkish candied pumpkin dessert also called Rachal in Armenian cuisine
- Rachal (surname), list of notable people with the surname
- Rachal, Texas, unincorporated community

== See also ==
- Rachel (disambiguation)
- Rachele (disambiguation)
