= Apostolic Prefecture of Dessié =

The Apostolic Prefecture of Dessié was a Roman Catholic Church pre-diocesan missionary jurisdiction, with its seat in the north-central town of Dessie, Ethiopia. It existed from 1937 to 1951.

As it was exempt, it was directly dependent on the Holy See.

== History and Ordinary ==
It was established on 25 March 1937, under Italian rule, as the Apostolic Prefecture of Dessié (Dessie), on territory split off from the then Apostolic Vicariate of Abyssinia, the heartland of Ethiopia.

On 31 October 1951 it was suppressed, and its territory was merged back into what was by then the Apostolic Exarchate of Addis Abeba (which became the Metropolitanate in chief of an Alexandrian Rite Eastern Catholic particular church sui iuris), in Abyssinia.

Its first and only Ordinary was Father Costanzo Bergna, Friars Minor (O.F.M.) (28 July 1937 – until his death on 12 December 1941).

== See also ==
- Roman Catholicism in Ethiopia

== Source and External links ==
- GCatholic
