= Apostolic Prefecture of Gondar =

The Apostolic Prefecture of Gondar was a pre-diocesan Christian missionary jurisdiction with its ecclesiastical seat in Gondar, Ethiopia. It existed from 1937 to 1951. The prefecture was a Roman Catholic diocese.

It was exempt, i.e. directly dependent on the Holy See.

== History and ordinary ==
It was established on 1937.03.25, during the Italian occupation, as Apostolic Prefecture of Gondar, on territory split off from the then Apostolic Vicariate of Abyssinia, the heartland of Ethiopia.

On 1951.10.31 it was suppressed, its territory being merged back into what was by then the Apostolic Exarchate of Addis Abeba (which became the Metropolitanate in chief of an Alexandrian rite Eastern Catholic particular church sui iuris), in Abyssinia.

Its first and only Ordinary was Father Pietro Villa, Comboni Missionaries (F.S.C.I.) (1937.07.28 – resigned 1946.03.25), later Titular Bishop of Lystra (1946.03.25 – death 1960.11.13) and Auxiliary Bishop of the Suburbicarian Diocese of Porto e Santa Rufina (Italy) (1946.03.25 – 1951), finally Auxiliary Bishop of the Suburbicarian Diocese of Ostia (Italy) (1951 – 1960.11.13).
