= Elephantaria in Mauretania =

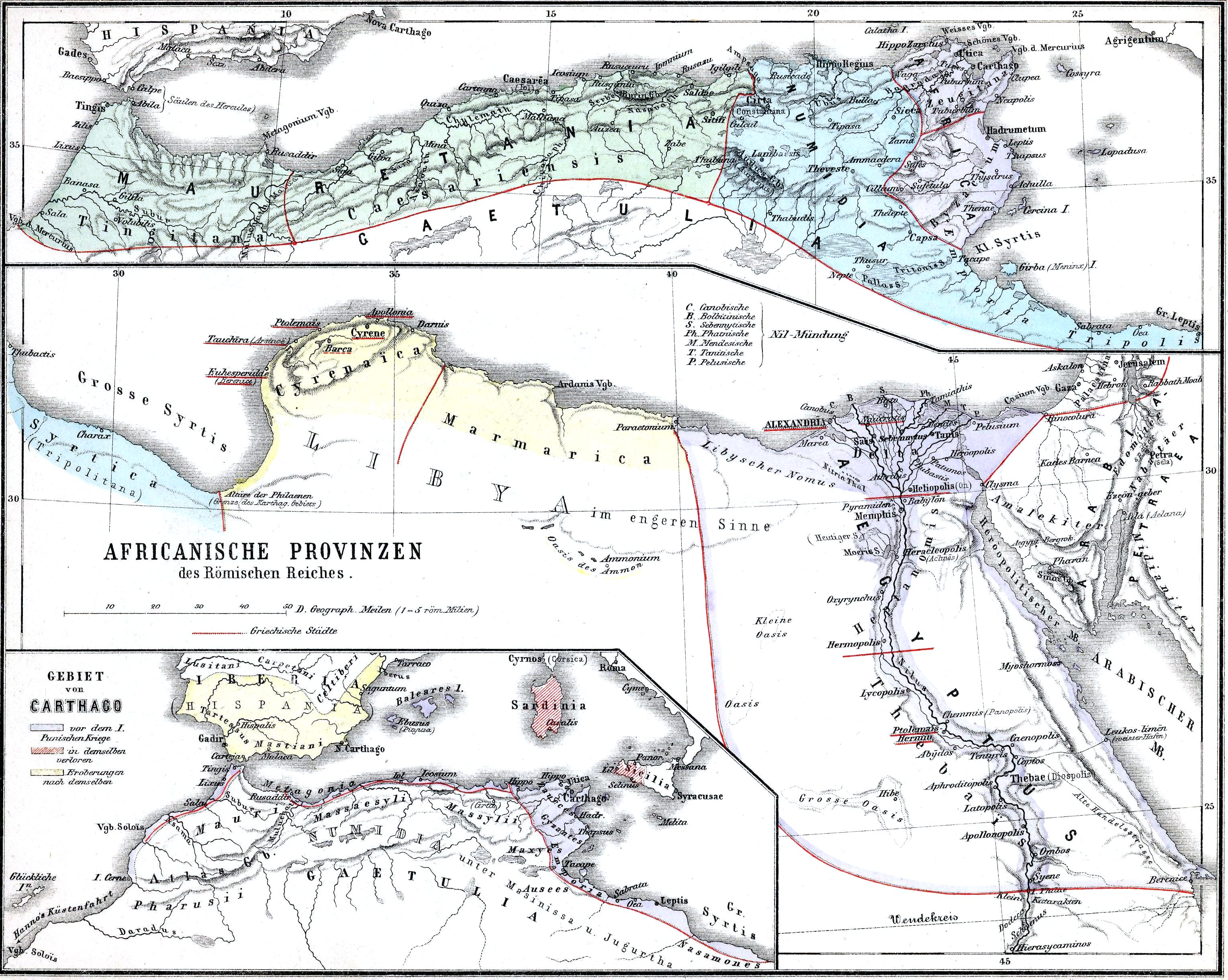
Roman North Africa

Elephantaria in Mauretania was an ancient city in the Maghreb during the Roman, Byzantine and Vandal empires. It is shown on the Peutinger Table map.

Today, the city exists only as unexcavated ruins at Henchir, a suburb of Algiers, and a titular see in the Mauretania Caesariensis province of the Roman Catholic Church. Until 2020 the title was held by Angelo Moreschi, of Ethiopia.
