= Ethiopian Catholic Eparchy of Adigrat =

Eastern Catholic diocese in Ethiopia

Eparchy of Adigrat Eparchia Adigratensis
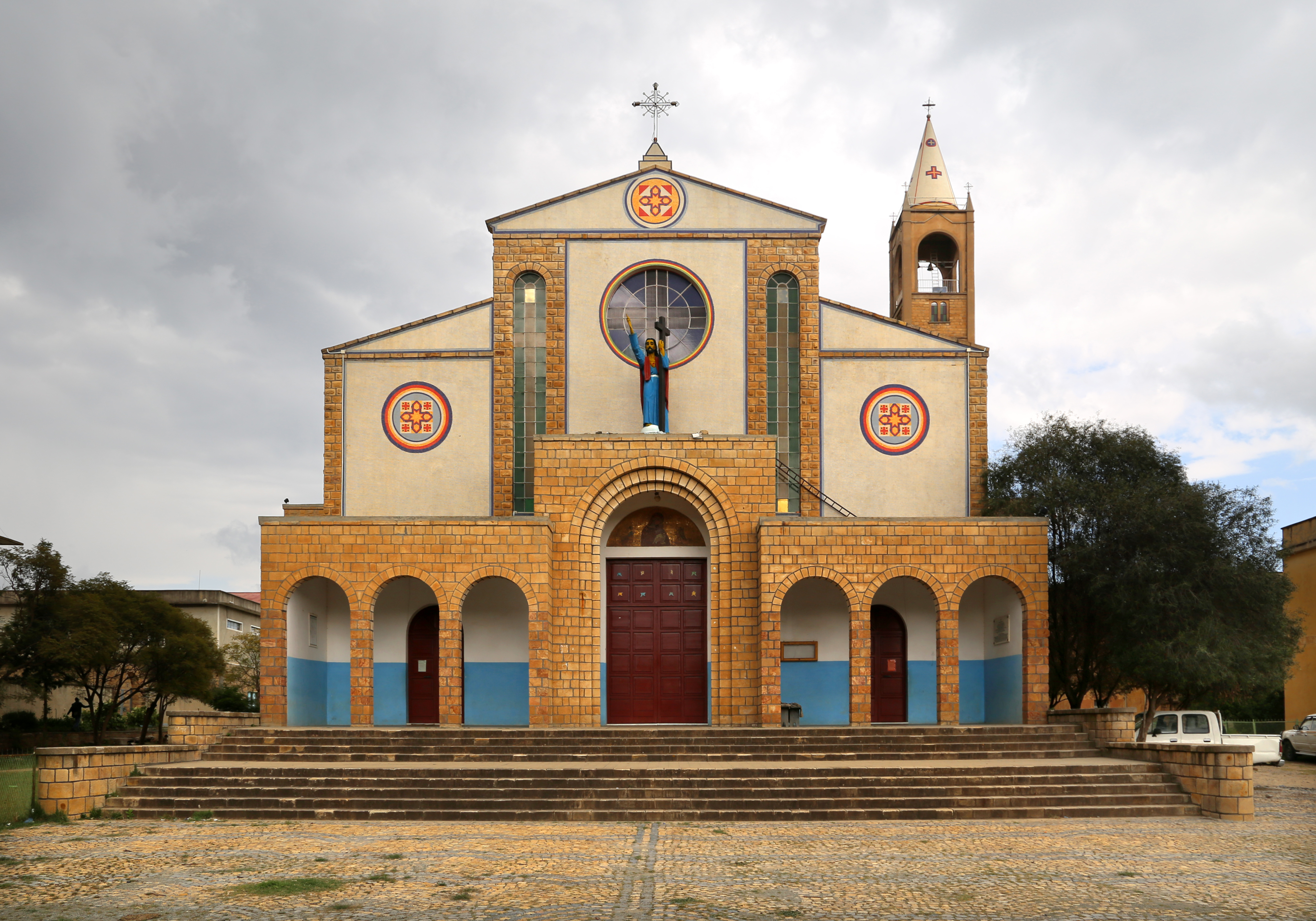
- Cathedral of the Holy Saviour, Adigrat

Location
- Country: Ethiopia
- Ecclesiastical province: Addis Ababa
- Coordinates: 14°16′N 39°29′E

Statistics
- Area: 80,000 km^{2} (31,000 sq mi)
- Population: Total; Catholics: (as of 2010); 4,601,000; 22,687 (.5%)
- Parishes: 36

Information
- Denomination: Ethiopian Catholic Church
- Rite: Alexandrian Rite
- Established: 25 March 1937 (89 years ago)
- Cathedral: Cathedral of the Holy Saviour

Current leadership
- Pope: Leo XIV
- Bishop: Tesfasellassie Medhin

Map
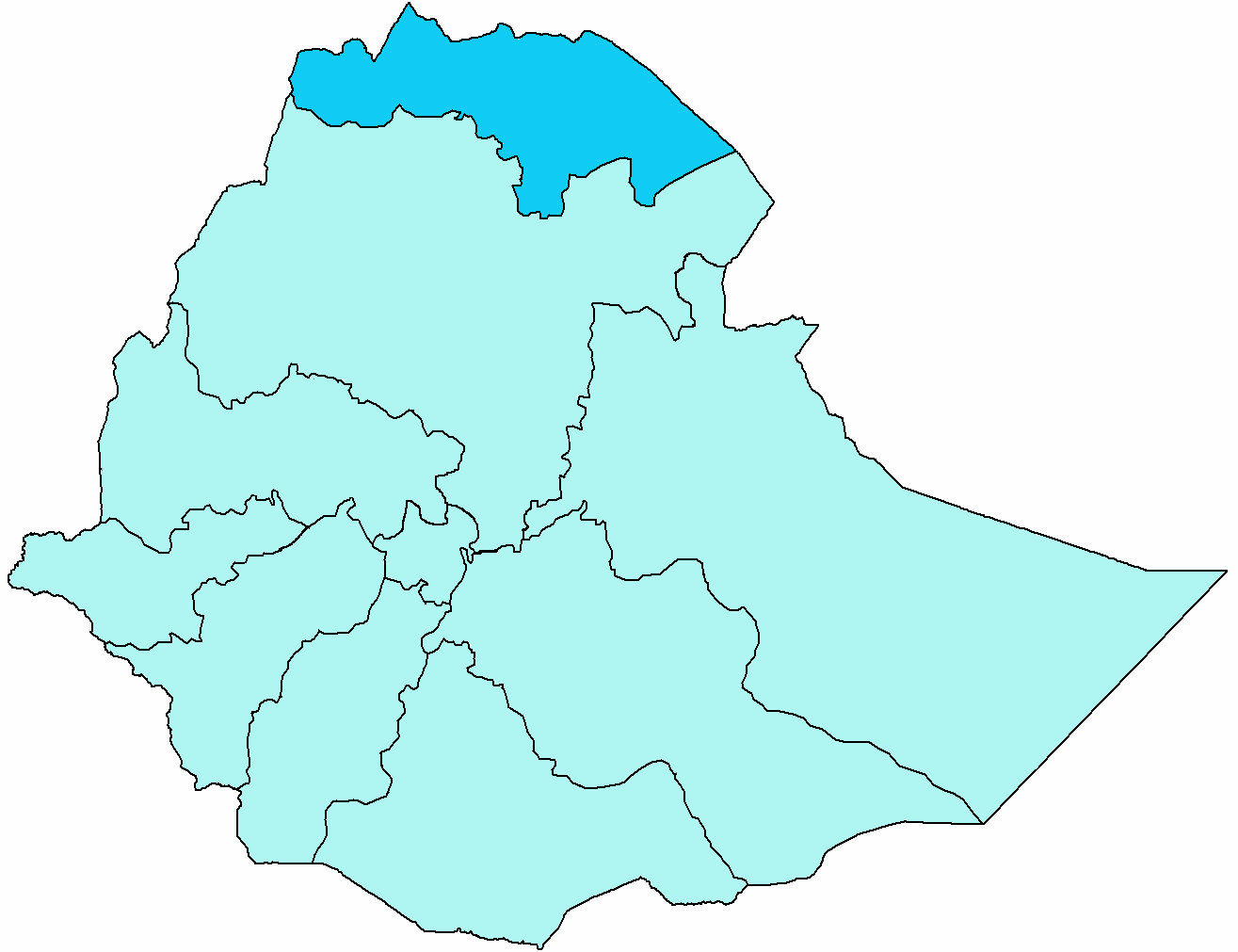

The Ethiopian Catholic Eparchy of Adigrat (Latin: Eparchia Adigratensis) is a Catholic eparchy located in the city of Adigrat, Ethiopia. It is in the ecclesiastical province of Addis Ababa.

== History ==
On 25 March 1937, Pope Pius XI established the Prefecture Apostolic of Tigray from the Vicariate Apostolic of Abyssinia. Pope John XXIII elevated it as the Eparchy of Adigrat on 20 February 1961.

== Ordinaries ==
- Bartolomeo Bechis, C.M. † (1937 - 1939 Resigned)
- Salvatore Pane, C.M. † (10 Jun 1939 - 1951 Died)
- Hailé Mariam Cahsai † (20 Feb 1961 - 24 Nov 1970 Died)
- Sebhat-Leab Worku, S.D.B. † (12 Jun 1971 - 12 Oct 1984 Resigned)
- Kidane-Mariam Teklehaimanot † (12 Oct 1984 - 16 Nov 2001 Resigned)
- Tesfasellassie Medhin (16 Nov 2001–present)

== OVC Project ==
The ADCS (Adigrat Diocese Catholic Secretary) is responsible for an OVC project (OVC = "Orphans and Vulnerable Children") that grants micro-scholarships to disadvantaged young people in the Tigray region. In 2010–2017, the Student Initiative Rahel in Germany collected donations for the OVC project in Adigrat.
