= Student Initiative Rahel =

Coordinates: 50.09848°N 8.712°E

The Student Initiative Rahel (German: Rahel-Bildungsprojekt) was a project of the Institute for World Church and Mission (IWM, German: Institut für Weltkirche und Mission), which is part of the Sankt Georgen Graduate School of Philosophy and Theology in Frankfurt-Sachsenhausen. The nonprofit project started in 2010 and collected money until 2017, financing scholarships for disadvantaged young people, mostly women, in Adigrat in northern Ethiopia. The students in Ethiopia were also supported ideally during their education. The project was run mainly by current and former students at the IWM in Germany. It was largely funded by donations.

== History ==
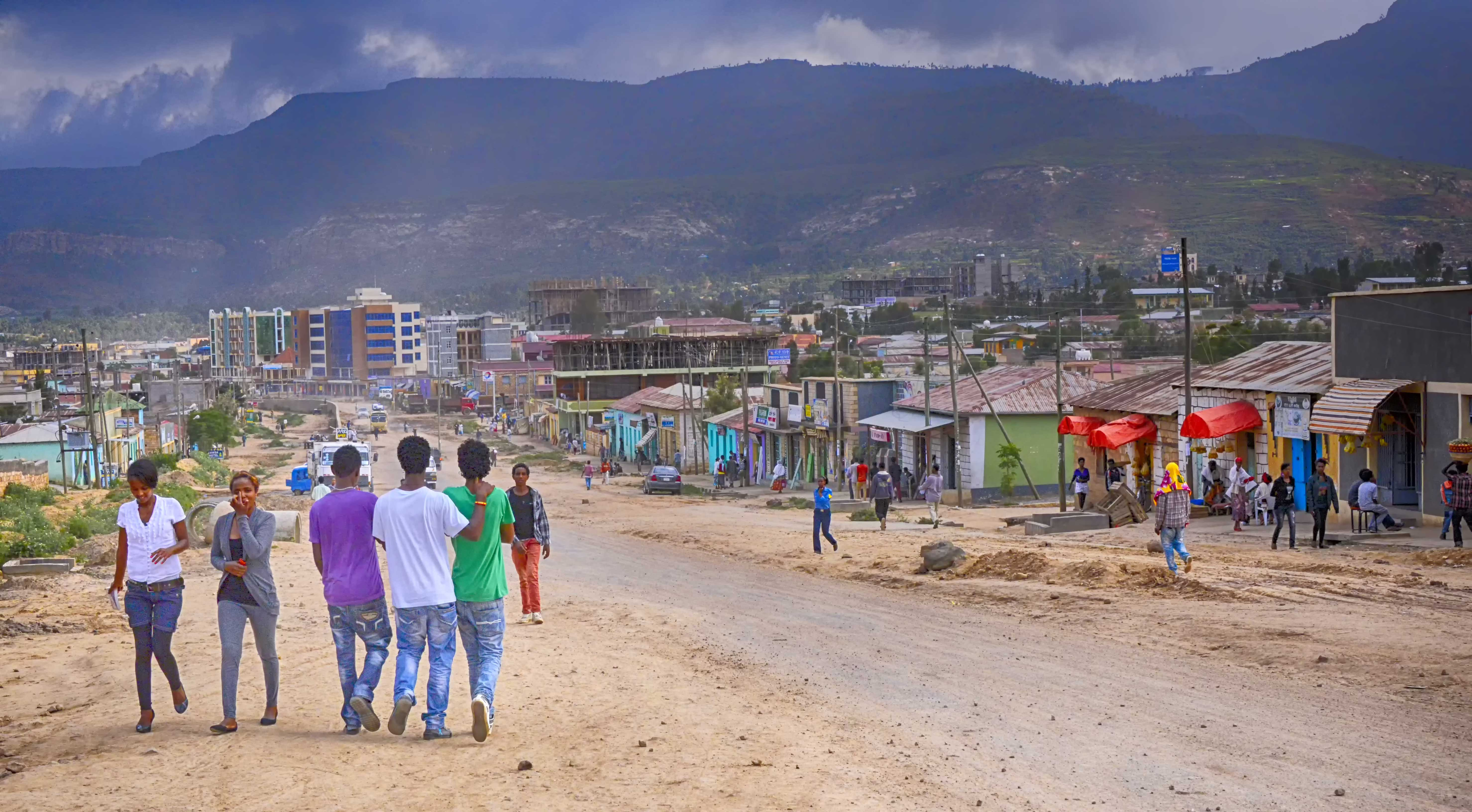
Street scene in Adigrat, 2014

The idea for the educational project was developed in 2010 during a research trip on the subject of AIDS by the then head of the IWM, Albert-Peter Rethmann. It was in the context of a research project of the German Bishops' Conference in Adigrat in Tigray Region in northern Ethiopia. In this region, many young people, especially young women, have no access to higher education, many are AIDS orphans. An initiative of the Adigrat Diocesan Catholic Secretariat (ADCS) of the Ethiopian Catholic Eparchy of Adigrat had already supported ten young people with micro-scholarships for obtaining a university entrance qualification and at least one bachelor's degree in their own country. The result of the journey was an international initiative of students for students in the context of globalization.

The Rahel project was named after Rahel Hailay, an AIDS orphan who studied biology and zoology at the universities in Axum and Mek'ele from 2009 to 2014. By 2015 the Rahel project had enabled the training of 47 young Ethiopians. Later it was possible to support 40 young people at the same time.

In November 2017, the project was announced to be phasing out. In a farewell letter to the donors, the Rahel team wrote that it expected its work to be gradually taken over by the Adigrat Diocesan Catholic Secretariat (ADCS) and former graduates in Ethiopia. The Rahel team conveyed the same message on Facebook in January 2018, clarifying that it would not accept any further donations.

== Target ==
The project supported disadvantaged, primarily female, young people in the Tigray Region who lack equal access to education for reasons of poverty or gender. The financial support consisted of micro-scholarships. The scholarship holders were accompanied during their studies or education. Networking among scholarship holders and the value of ethical behaviour was promoted. Women who achieve a higher level of education should understand their importance as role models for others.

This development cooperation was intended to give freedom to the beneficiaries, making them self-responsible. The motivation of the beneficiaries to support the idea was a key factor. Therefore the promotion of autonomy and self-initiative was part of the project. The initiative of the students in Germany could also serve as a model for the students in Ethiopia.

As a secondary effect, training programs such as the Rahel project are a medium to long-term contribution to the fight against the refugee crisis.

== Funding, support and public relations ==
The educational project was financed through public donations and campaigns, such as at the Frankfurter Stadtkirchenfest at the Frankfurt Cathedral, collects in Catholic church parishes and the Holy Cross – Centre for Christian Meditation and Spirituality of the Roman Catholic Diocese of Limburg, or the summer festival of the Sankt Georgen Graduate School of Philosophy and Theology. These actions also created new contacts, information and exchange on the project. They were supported by the Network of Frankfurt One World Groups in Frankfurt.

The Rachel educational project was funded by the Cusanuswerk, a gifted support program under the supervision of the Catholic German Bishops' Conference and by the Centre for Christian Meditation and Spirituality of the Diocese of Limburg.

The project was supported by the Pontifical Mission Societies (German: missio) in all financial matters, such as account management, the administrative costs or the transfer of money to Ethiopia.

Public relations efforts were made in the internet.

== Realisation in Ethiopia ==
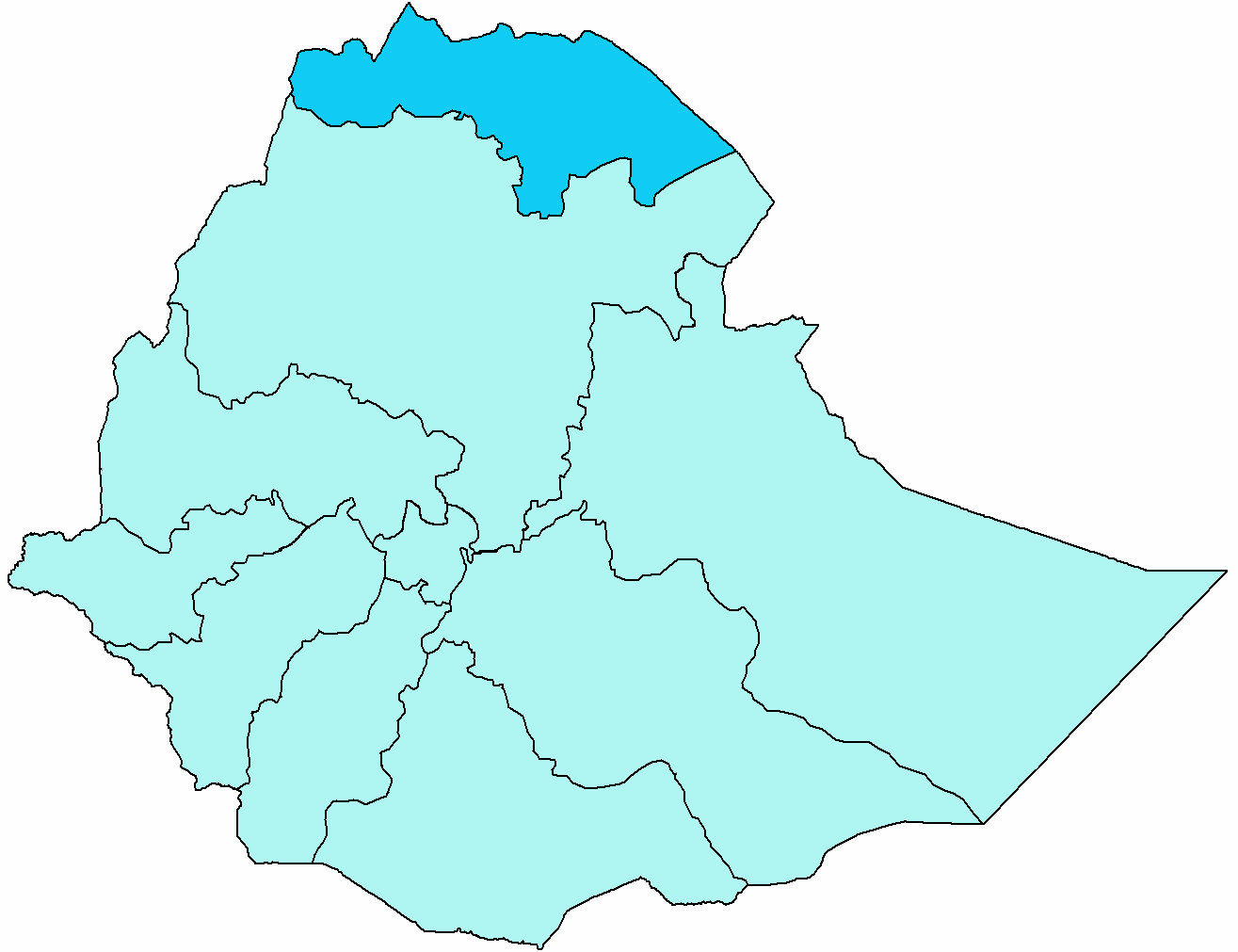
Ethiopian Catholic Eparchy of Adigrat

In Ethiopia the project was referred to as an OVC project (orphans and vulnerable children). It was supervised locally by the Adigrat Diocesan Catholic Secretariat (ADCS) of the Ethiopian Catholic Eparchy of Adigrat under the patronage of diocesan bishop Tesfay Medhin.

The project manager of the ADCS Woldemariam Besirat selected the scholarship holders, and organized religious education workshops on topics such as AIDS, the consequences of emigration or ethical issues. The promotion of self-reliance, self-confidence and self-esteem, awareness of social responsibility and the importance of cooperation were some of the aspects of the OVC project.

== Literature ==
- Judith Breunig, Madeleine Helbig, Claudia Berg, Stefanie Matulla, Magdalena Strauch, Marita Wagner, Benedikt Winkler (June 2015): Rahel – Ein Bildungsprojekt für Adigrat. Festschrift der Studierendeninitiative. Ein Blick durch die Zeit: 2010–2015. Institut für Weltkirche und Mission, Frankfurt.
  [The title translated: Rahel – An education project for Adigrat. Festschrift of the initiative by students. A view through the years: 2010–2015.]
