= Berhaneyesus Demerew Souraphiel =

Ethiopian Catholic archbishop and cardinal

His Eminence Berhaneyesus Demerew Souraphiel C.M.
- Cardinal, Archbishop Emeritus of Addis Abeba
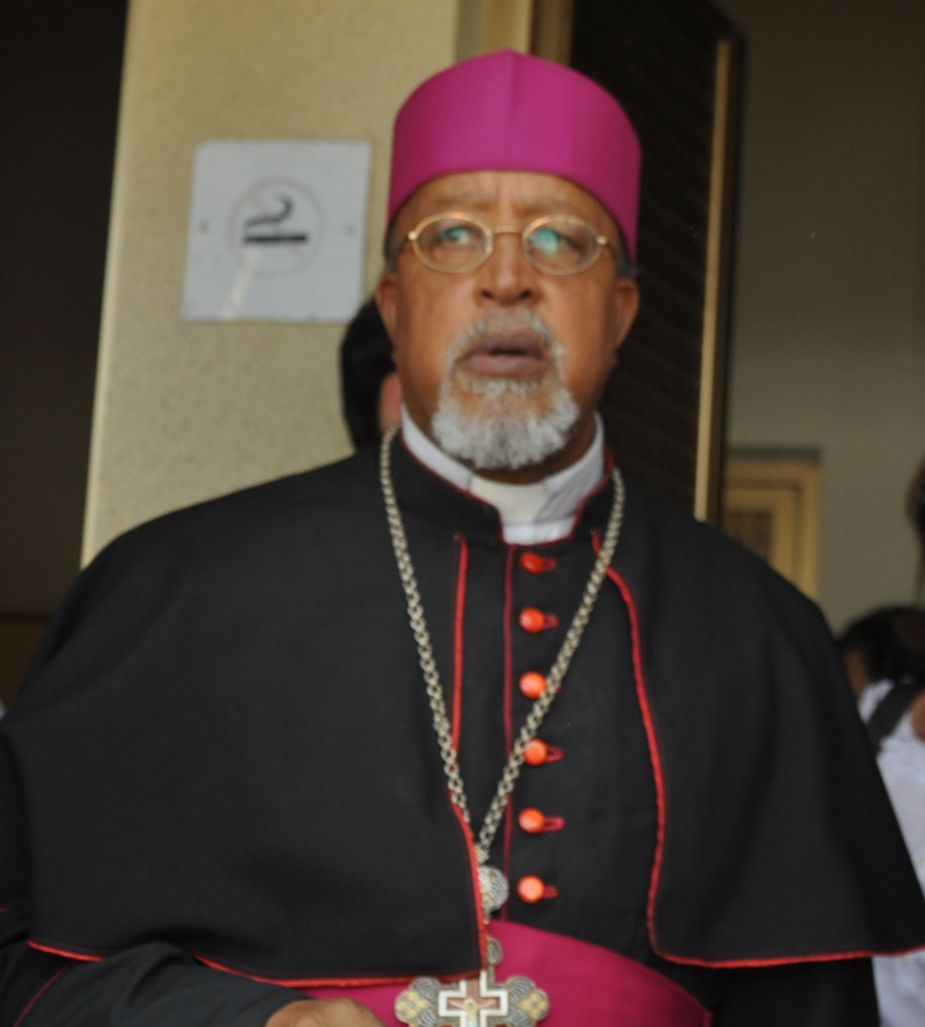
- Church: Ethiopian Catholic Church
- See: Addis Abeba
- Appointed: 7 July 1999
- Term ended: 12 June 2026
- Predecessor: Paulos Tzadua
- Successor: Tesfaye Tadesse Gebresilasie
- Other posts: President of Council of the Ethiopian Church; President of the Ethiopian and Eritrean Episcopal Conference; Cardinal-Priest of San Romano Martire
- Previous posts: Titular Bishop of Bita (1997–1999); Apostolic Administrator of Addis Abeba (1997–1999)

Orders
- Ordination: 4 July 1976
- Consecration: 25 January 1998 by Paulos Tzadua
- Created cardinal: 14 February 2015 by Pope Francis

Personal details
- Born: 14 July 1948 (age 78) Tchela Claka, Ethiopia
- Coat of arms: Berhaneyesus Demerew Souraphiel's coat of arms

Ordination history of Berhaneyesus Demerew Souraphiel
History
Priestly ordination
- Date: 4 July 1976
Episcopal consecration
- Principal consecrator: Paulos Tzadua
- Co-consecrators: Yohannes Woldeghiorghis; Woldetensae Ghebreghiorgis
- Date: 25 January 1998
Cardinalate
- Elevated by: Pope Francis
- Date: 14 February 2015
Episcopal succession
Bishops consecrated by Berhaneyesus Demerew Souraphiel as principal consecrator
- Tesfasellassie Medhin: 20 January 2002
- Abraham Desta: 10 May 2002
- Musie Ghebreghiorghis, OFM Cap.: 8 February 2004
- Rodrigo Mejia Saldarriaga, SJ: 4 March 2007
- Giovanni Migliorati, MCCI: 31 May 2009
- Theodorus van Ruiyven, CM: 30 August 2009
- Markos Ghebremedhin, CM: 24 January 2010
- Angelo Moreschi, SDB: 31 January 2010
- Woldeghiorghis Mathewos: 11 April 2010
- Lisane-Christos Matheos Semahun: 18 April 2010
- Tsegaye Keneni Derara: 24 November 2013
- Angelo Pagano, OFM Cap.: 29 May 2016
- Roberto Bergamaschi, SDB: 8 October 2016

Styles of Berhaneyesus Demerew Souraphiel
- Reference style: His Eminence
- Spoken style: Your Eminence
- Religious style: Cardinal
- Informal style: Cardinal

Berhaneyesus Demerew Souraphiel, CM (Amharic: ብርሃነ ኢየሱስ ደምረው ሱራፌል; born 14 July 1948) is a hierarch of the Ethiopian Catholic Church, that served as a head of the Ethiopian Catholic Church sui iuris and Archbishop of Addis Abeba since 1999 until his retirement in 2026. He is also the chancellor of the Catholic University of Eastern Africa and the president of the Catholic Bishops’ Conference of Ethiopia and Eritrea. He was made a cardinal by Pope Francis in 2015.

He was imprisoned by the Communist government of Ethiopia in 1979–80. A member of the Congregation of the Mission, he directed the order's novitiate in the mid-1980s and was provincial superior from 1990 to 1994. He served as Auxiliary Bishop of Addis Abeba for 18 months before becoming archbishop.

== Early life and priesthood ==
Berhaneyesus Demerew Souraphiel was born on 14 July 1948 in Tchela Claka, near Harar in Ethiopia. He first attended public schools and those run by the Ethiopian Orthodox Tewahedo Church, and then others run by the Capuchins and the De La Salle Brothers. He entered the minor seminary of the Congregation of the Mission (known as "Lazarists" or "Vincentians") in 1963. He studied at the Makanissa Major Seminary beginning in 1968. He studied theology at King's College London and was ordained a Catholic priest on 4 July 1976.

He fulfilled parish assignments in southwestern Ethiopia until, in June 1979, he was jailed by Ethiopia's military dictatorship for seven months, including one month in solitary confinement. When the government expelled foreign missionaries, he was left with responsibility for 15 parishes in addition to his original assignment. When sent into exile himself, he earned a degree in sociology at the Pontifical Gregorian University. He returned to Ethiopia in 1983.

== Episcopate ==
In 1990 Berhaneyesus Souraphiel became provincial superior of the Lazarists in Addis Ababa. In 1994 he was appointed prefect of the newly created Apostolic Vicariate of Jimma-Bonga. On 7 November 1997, Pope John Paul II appointed him auxiliary bishop of Addis Abeba and he was consecrated a bishop on 25 January 1998 by Cardinal Paulos Tzadua. On 7 July 1999 he succeeded Paulos Tzadua as Ethiopian Catholic Archbishop of Addis Abeba.

In 2005, he established the Ethiopian Catholic University of St. Thomas Aquinas. He has served as its chancellor and toured the United States to raise funds through an organization founded by Archbishop Silvano Tomasi, a veteran Vatican diplomat.

In December 2008, he was one of a dozen Ethiopian religious figures who adopted a resolution that called homosexuality "an infestation", and urged Ethiopian lawmakers to extend the country's criminalization of homosexual activity to the constitution.

He was elected chairman of the Association of Member Episcopal Conferences in Eastern Africa (AMECEA) during its 18th Plenary Assembly in Malawi in July 2014.

== Cardinal ==
On 4 January 2015, Pope Francis announced that he would make him a cardinal on 14 February. At that ceremony, he was made a cardinal priest and was assigned the titular church of San Romano Martire.

On 13 April 2015, he was appointed a member of the Congregation for the Oriental Churches and of the Pontifical Council for the Pastoral Care of Migrants and Itinerants.

In 2015, as part of a long campaign for national reconciliation following the end of the military council's authoritarian rule (1974–1987), he advocated for imprisoned Derg officials to have their death sentences commuted, and he met with several of them, including one who had arrested him years earlier, upon their release from prison. He has served as head of the Ethiopian Peace and Reconciliation Commission.

In advance of the Synod on the Amazon, he said he viewed the question of married priests as secondary to more critical issues: "the Amazon is the lung of the world — and it was burning — and what action was being taken? And the indigenous people who are living there, what right have they been given by the nine countries which surround the Amazon? Did they get educational opportunities? Health opportunities? Opportunities to preserve their traditional values?"

He participated as a cardinal elector in the 2025 papal conclave that elected Pope Leo XIV. Cardinal Souraphiel is also the first Ethiopian cardinal ever to participate in a papal conclave. (Note: Cardinal Souraphiel is the second Ethiopian cardinal, the first being his immediate predecessor Paulos Tzadua. Cardinal Tzadua turned 80 before having an opportunity to participate in a papal conclave.)

On 12 June 2026, Pope Leo XIV accepted the retirement from the pastoral care of the Metropolitan Archeparchy of Addis Ababa, presented by Cardinal Berhaneyesus Demerew Souraphiel. Concurrently, he appointed Tesfaye Tadesse Gebresilasie, who has been serving as the auxiliary bishop of the same see, as the new Metropolitan Archbishop of Addis Ababa and head of the Ethiopian Catholic Church.

== See also ==
- Cardinals created by Pope Francis

== Notes ==
Catholic Church titles
Preceded by vicariate established	Vicar Apostolic of Jimma-Bonga	Succeeded by Theodorus van Ruiyven, CM
Preceded by Paulos Tzadua	Titular Bishop of Bita; 1997–1999	Succeeded by vacant
Preceded by Paulos Tzadua	Archbishop of Addis Abeba; 1999 – 2026	Succeeded by Tesfaye Tadesse Gebresilasie
Preceded by titular church established	Cardinal Priest of San Romano Martire; 2015 – present	Incumbent
