= Mathara in Numidia =

Diocese

Mathara was an Ancient city and suffragan bishopric in the Roman province of Numidia, in present Algeria.

== Titular see ==
In 1933, the bishopric was nominally revived as titular see, of the lowest (episcopal) rank, with a single exception, the present, archiepiscopal incumbent.

It had following incumbents, mostly Latin:

- Laurenz Böggering (25 July 1967 – 10 January 1996)
- Alois Schwarz (27 December 1996 – 22 May 2001)
- David Motiuk (5 April 2002 – 25 January 2007)
- Franz-Josef Overbeck (18 July 2007 – 28 October 2009)
- Lisane-Christos Matheos Semahun (5 January 2010 – 19 January 2015), then auxiliary eparch of the Eastern Catholic (Alexandrian Rite) Metropolitan Ethiopian Catholic Archeparchy of Addis Abeba; next appointed suffragan of that Metropolitan in the newly created Ethiopian Catholic Eparchy of Bahir Dar–Dessie
- Titular Archbishop Ghaleb Moussa Abdalla Bader (23 May 2015—), Apostolic Nuncio to the Dominican Republic, Apostolic Delegate to Puerto Rico
