= Savatra =

City in the Roman province of Galatia

Coordinates: 37°58′27″N 33°06′38″E

Savatra (Ancient Greek: Σαύατρα), Sabatra, or Soatra (Ancient Greek: Σόατρα) was a city in the Roman province of Galatia, and subsequently the Byzantine province of Lycaonia.

== History ==
Little is known of this ancient town, but some of its coins have been preserved, and it is mentioned by Strabo, Ptolemy, Hierocles, and the Tabula Peutingeriana. The name appears as "Savatra" on the coins, while "Sabatra" is found in the Tabula, and "Soatra" in Strabo.

The town was situated in an arid region on the road from Laodicea Combusta (now Ladik) to Archelais (now Aksaray), near the village of Souverek, in what was formerly the Ottoman vilayet of Koniah: according to W. M. Ramsay, at the ruins four hours south-west of Eskil; according to Müller, near Djelil between Obrouklou, or Obrouk, and Sultan Khan. Modern scholars place the site near Yağlibayat in Asiatic Turkey.

=== Ecclesiastical history ===
Le Quien mentions two bishops of Savatra: Aristophanes, present at the First Ecumenical Council of Constantinople in 381; and Eustathius, who was living at the time of the Council of Chalcedon in 451. The Greek Notitiae episcopatuum mention the see till the thirteenth century. It remains a Roman Catholic titular see, suffragan of the archbishopric of Iconium.

== Sources ==
- Herbermann, Charles, ed. (1913). "Sauatra". Catholic Encyclopedia. New York: Robert Appleton Company.
