= Apostolic Vicariate of Soddo =

Catholic missionary jurisdiction in Ethiopia

Apostolic Vicariate of Soddo Vicariatus Apostolicus Soddensis

Location
- Country: Ethiopia
- Metropolitan: Immediately subject to the Holy See

Statistics
- Area: 55,000 km^{2} (21,000 sq mi)
- Population: Total; Catholics: (as of 2004); 6,900,000; 198,827 (2.9%)

Information
- Rite: Latin Rite

Current leadership
- Bishop: Hailemichael Dejene Hidoto Gamo, O.F.M. Cap
- Bishops emeritus: Tsegaye Keneni Derara

The Apostolic Vicariate of Soddo (Latin: Vicariatus Apostolicus Soddensis) is a Roman Catholic apostolic vicariate located in the city of Sodo in Ethiopia.

The Vicariate Apostolic of Soddo comprises Wolayta, Dawro, Gamu Gofa, North and South Omo zones and Derashe, Konso and Konta special Weredas; all in Southern Nations Nationalities and Peoples Region.

== History ==
- February 13, 1940: Established as Apostolic Prefecture of Hosanna from the Apostolic Vicariate of Gimma and Apostolic Prefecture of Neghelli
- December 30, 1977: Renamed as Apostolic Prefecture of Soddo–Hosanna
- October 15, 1982: Promoted as Apostolic Vicariate of Soddo–Hosanna
- January 20, 2010: The Apostolic Vicariate of Hosanna, Ethiopia (area 12,000, population 2,400,000, Catholics 135,000, priests 35, religious 51) is formed when the Apostolic Vicariate is divided into two Apostolic Vicariates by Pope Benedict XVI. He appointed Father Woldeghiorghis Mathewos, spiritual father of the Major Seminary of Soddo-Hosanna in Addis Ababa, Ethiopia, as the first Bishop of the new Apostolic Vicariate. The Bishop-elect was born in Wassera, Ethiopia in 1942 and ordained a priest in 1969.
- October 11, 2013: Pope Francis appoints the Reverend Father Tsegaye Keneni Dérera, who until then had been serving as the Vicar General of the Apostolic Vicariate of Nekemte (based in Nekemte, Ethiopia), as Coadjutor Vicar Apostolic of the Apostolic Vicariate of Soddo–Hosanna, to assist and eventually succeed the incumbent. Bishop-elect Dérera was given the titular see of Massimiana of Bizacena. He was born on November 23, 1943, at Metcha Borodo, Ethiopia, in the Apostolic Vicariate of Nekemte. After primary and secondary education in his native village, he studied one year of the requisite undergraduate Philosophy training with the Vincentians. He completed his undergraduate studies and graduate Theology education in Rome, Italy, in residence at the Pontifical Ethiopian College, while studying at the Pontifical Lateran University. He was ordained to the Catholic priesthood on July 13, 1976, and then did postgraduate studies at the Institute of Pastoral Theology at the Loyola University of Chicago (LUC), subsequently becoming a priest of the Archeparchy of Addis Ababa. He earned a Master's in Pastoral Theology from LUC in 1995, and had served as Vicar General (1991–1999) and Chancellor of the Curia (1976–1999) in Addis Ababa, as well as Secretary of the Ethiopian bishops' conference (2007–2010), before his move to Nekemte in 2012 after service at an Ethiopian Catholic university.

== Bishops ==
- Prefects Apostolic of Hosanna
  - Fr. Tiziano da Verona, OFMCap (October 25, 1940 – 1945)
  - Bishop Urbain-Marie Person, OFMCap (Apostolic Administrator January 2, 1952 – 1972)
  - Fr. Domenico Crescentino Marinozzi, OFMCap (Apostolic Administrator 1972 – February 23, 1979); see below
- Prefect Apostolic of Soddo–Hosanna
  - Fr. Domenico Crescentino Marinozzi, OFMCap (February 23, 1979 – October 15, 1982); see above & below
- Vicars Apostolic of Soddo–Hosanna (Soddo, starting January 20, 2010)
  - Bishop Domenico Crescentino Marinozzi, OFMCap (October 15, 1982 – January 15, 2007); see above
  - Bishop Rodrigo Mejía Saldarriaga, SJ (January 5, 2007 – January 12, 2014)
  - Bishop Tsegaye Keneni Derara (January 12, 2014 – September 15, 2024) Vicar Apostolic Emeritus
  - Bishop Hailemichael Dejene Hidoto Gamo, O.F.M. Cap (September 15, 2024 – present)

=== Coadjutor Vicar Apostolic ===
- Tsegaye Keneni Derara (2013–2014)

=== Another priest of this vicariate who became bishop ===
- Woldeghiorghis Matheos, appointed Vicar Apostolic of Hosanna in 2010
