= Apostolic Vicariate of Hosanna =

Catholic missionary jurisdiction in Ethiopia

Apostolic Vicariate of Hosanna Vicariatus Apostolicus Hosannensis

Location
- Country: Ethiopia
- Metropolitan: Immediately subject to the Holy See
- Headquarters: Hosaena, Ethiopia

Information
- Denomination: Catholic Church
- Sui iuris church: Latin Church
- Rite: Roman Rite
- Cathedral: St. Joseph Cathedral

Current leadership
- Pope: Francis
- Apostolic Vicar: Seyoum Franso Noel

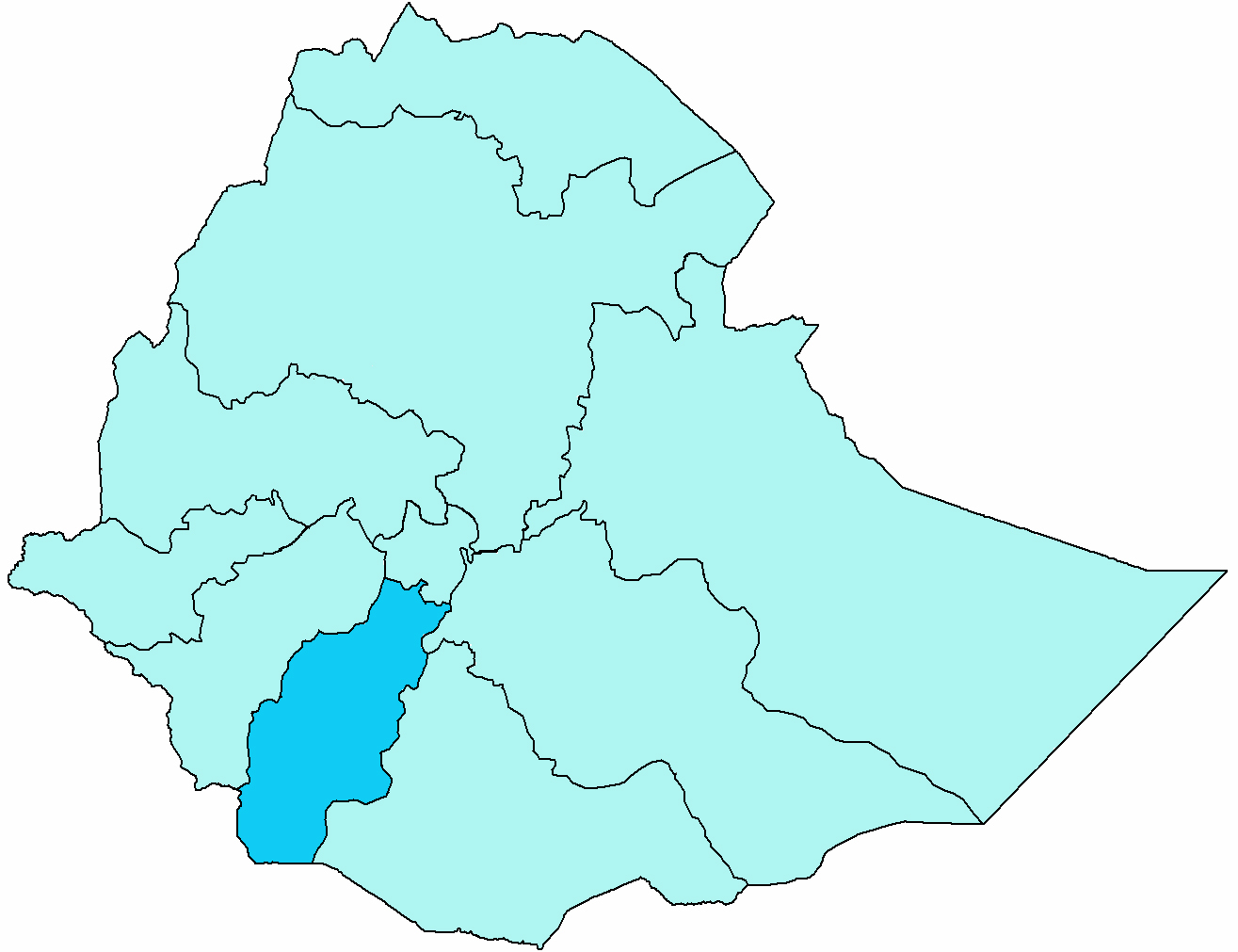

The Apostolic Vicariate of Hosanna is a Catholic pre-diocesan missionary jurisdiction of the Roman Catholic Church in Ethiopia (a country which is mostly Oriental Orthodox, of the Ethiopian Orthodox Tewahedo Church).

It is exempt, i.e. directly subject to the Holy See via the Congregation for the Evangelization of Peoples), not part of any ecclesiastical conference.

Its cathedral episcopal see since 2010 is a St. Joseph's cathedral, which was built in 1999 and dedicated to the diocesan patron saint, in Hosanna.

== Statistics ==
As per 2014, it pastorally served 143,204 Catholics (5.4% of 2,658,416 total) on 8,214 km² in 26 parishes and 3 missions with 48 priests (37 diocesan, 11 religious), 1 deacon, 64 lay religious (25 brothers, 39 sisters) and 15 seminarians.

== History ==
Established on 13 December 1940 as Apostolic Prefecture of Hosanna, on territories split off from the then Apostolic Prefecture of Neghelli and then Apostolic Vicariate of Gimma (now Nekemte) and run by missionary Friars Minor Capuchin.

Suppressed end of 1977, its territory being reassigned to establish the then Apostolic Prefecture of Soddo–Hosanna. Restored and promoted on 20 January, 2010 by Pope Benedict XVI as Apostolic Vicariate of Hosanna on territory restituted from the meanwhile promoted Apostolic Vicariate of Soddo–Hosanna (which is accordingly renamed Apostolic Vicariate of Soddo. The Apostolic Vicariate of Hosanna comprises the whole population of Hadiya, Kambata-Tambaro zones and parts of Alaba special woreda and Silte zone.

== Ordinaries ==
Apostolic Prefects of Hosanna

- Tiziano da Verona, OFMCap (1940.10.25 – death 1945)
- Apostolic Administrator Urbain-Marie Person, OFMCap (1952.01.02 – 1972), while Apostolic Prefect of Neghelli (Ethiopia) (1952.01.02 – 1969.10.15), also Apostolic Administrator of Apostolic Vicariate of Gimma (Ethiopia) (1952–1958), Apostolic Administrator of Apostolic Vicariate of Harar (Ethiopia) (1952 – 1955.07.03) until promoted Apostolic Vicar of Harar (1955.07.03 – 1981.12.04) & Titular Bishop of Cyme (1955.07.03 – 1994.02.09), Apostolic Prefect of Awasa (Ethiopia) (1969.10.15 – 1973.02.16)
- Apostolic Administrator Domenico Crescentino Marinozzi, OFMCap (1972 – 1977.12.30); later Apostolic Administrator of Soddo–Hosanna (Ethiopia) (1977.12.30 – 1979.02.23), promoted last Prefect Apostolic of Soddo–Hosanna (1979.02.23 – 1982.10.15), promoted Titular Bishop of Iucundiana (1982.10.15 – ...) & first Apostolic Vicar of Soddo–Hosanna (1982.10.15 – 2007.01.05)

Apostolic Vicars of Hosanna

- Woldeghiorghis Mathewos (2010.01.20 – retired 2017.04.08), Titular Bishop of Turuda (2010.01.20 – ...)
- Bishop Seyoum Franso Noel (2017.04.08 – ...), named Titular Bishop of Eminentiana (2017.04.08), ordained Bishop (2017.07.02).

== See also ==
- List of Catholic dioceses in Ethiopia and Eritrea
- Catholic Church in Ethiopia

== Sources and external links ==
- GCatholic with incumbent bio links - data for all sections
- GCatholic and GoogleMaps the cathedral
