= Santissimo Nome di Maria in Via Latina =

- Most Holy Name of Mary on Via Latina (in English); Santissimo Nominis Mariæ ad viam Latinam (in Latin); Kabanal-banalang Pangalan ni Maria sa Daang Latina (in Tagalog)
- Click on the map for a fullscreen view
- 41°52′16″N 12°30′41″E
- Location: Rome
- Country: Italy
- Denomination: Roman Catholic
- Religious institute: Marianists

History
- Status: Titular church
- Dedication: Holy Name of Mary
- Consecrated: 1981

Architecture
- Architect: Aldo Ortolani
- Architectural type: Church

Santissimo Nome di Maria a Via Latina is a modern parish and titular church at Via Centirupe 18/22 in the Appio Latino quarter, just to the east of the Parco della Caffarella in Rome, Italy. The dedication is to the Holy Name of Mary. The parish is administered by the Marianists whose General Curia (world headquarters) is based here; Gaudencio Borbon Rosales is the Cardinal-Priest.

== Design ==
The church was built in 1980 and was designed by Aldo Ortolani. The plan is based on a square with the major axis on the diagonal. The corners of the square at the entrance and behind the altar are truncated. From entrance to altar a high rectangular concrete frame supports a flat roof. On either side the building descends in four horizontal steps, each step supports a vertical concrete vane. These steps are replicated vertically along the side frontages. At the side angles of the square are two semi-circular chapels, one dedicated to St Anthony of Padua and the other to Our Lady of the Pillar (a Spanish devotion).

The entrance façade and the external altar wall are concrete slabs. The rest of the structure is bare concrete. A canopy floats over the entrance, which slopes down in an inward curve. On its fascia is a dedicatory inscription. The entrance doors are carved wood planking and are set in varnished planking that fills the frontage below the canopy. At the top of the entrance façade is a horizontal window strip. Vertical window strips edge each vertical step along the side frontages. Another horizontal window strip is at the top of the altar wall.

A tall campanile is of two narrow concrete slabs in the form of an L. The bells are hung in the angle. There is a metal cross on the top.

== Interior ==
Like the exterior, the interior is entirely exposed grey concrete. The vast single space houses abstract stained glass in the horizontal and vertical window strips, the colours of which are dominated by azure blue. Behind the altar is a semicircular coved concrete wall, surrounded by vertical and horizontal window strips that are mostly magenta. Above this is the main altar wall, which has an upward and outward sweep of raw concrete bearing a figure of Christ crucified without a cross. The two chapels are smaller with blue glass.

== Cardinal-Priests ==
- Paulos Tzadua (Ethiopia) (May 25, 1985 – December 11, 2003)
- Gaudencio Rosales. (Philippines) (March 24, 2006–present)
