= Paulos Tzadua =

Ethiopian Catholic prelate

His Eminence Paulos Tzadua
- Cardinal, Archbishop emeritus of Addis Abeba
- Church: Ethiopian Catholic Church
- See: Addis Abeba
- Appointed: 24 February 1977
- Term ended: 11 September 1998
- Predecessor: Asrate Mariam Yemmeru
- Successor: Berhaneyesus Demerew Souraphiel
- Other post: Cardinal Priest of Santissimo Nome di Maria in Via Latina

Orders
- Consecration: 20 May 1973 (Bishop) by Asrate Mariam Yemmeru
- Created cardinal: 25 May 1985

Personal details
- Born: 25 August 1921 Addifini, Italian Eritrea
- Died: 11 December 2003 (aged 82) Rome, Italy
- Buried: Saints Peter and Paul Catholic Cemetery, Addis Abeba
- Coat of arms

Paulos Tzadua (25 August 1921–11 December 2003) was an Ethiopian Catholic prelate who served as Archbishop of Addis Abeba and head of the Ethiopian Catholic Church from 1977 to 1998. He was made the first-ever Ethiopian cardinal in 1985.

== Life ==
Cardinal Paulos Tzadua (ብጹዕ ካርዲናል ጳውሎስ ጻድዋ) was born on 25 August 1921 in Addi-finié of Tsenadegle, Akeleguzay (Provinces of Eritrea), Eritrea. He studied in the Italian High School of Asmara and later he earned a degree in law at the Università Cattolica del Sacro Cuore of Milan. Paulos Tzadua was ordained priest on 12 March 1944 and served for five years in missions in Ethiopia. He continued his studies in Asmara and later in Milan and in 1960 he became the secretary to the archbishop of Addis Abeba. From 1961 to 1973 he taught at the Addis Ababa University.

On 1 March 1973 he was chosen as auxiliary bishop of Addis Abeba and was consecrated bishop on 20 May 1973 by Archbishop Asrate Mariam Yemmeru. On 24 February 1977 he succeeded to Archbishop Asrate Yemmeru as Ethiopian Catholic Archbishop of Addis Abeba. He was created Cardinal-Priest of Santissimo Nome di Maria in Via Latina in the consistory of 25 May 1985. He was the first Ethiopian / Eritrean Cardinal.

At 77, Paulos Tzadua retired as head of the Archdiocese of Addis Abeba on 11 September 1998. He died in Rome on 11 December 2003, and his funeral were officiated by Pope John Paul II. He was buried in Adis Abeba.

== Works ==
As a scholar, Paulos Tzadua is known for his 1968 English translation of the Fetha Nagast. As well as for his studies on the Ethiopic Liturgy.
