= San Romano Martire, Rome =

Roman Catholic church in Rome, Italy

Church of Saint Romanus Martyr
- San Romano Martire (in Italian); S. Romani Martyris (in Latin)
- Click on the map for a fullscreen view
- 41°54′38.67″N 12°32′17.24″E
- Location: Rome
- Country: Italy
- Denomination: Roman Catholic
- Tradition: Roman Rite
- Website: Official website

History
- Status: Parish church, titular church
- Dedication: Romanus Ostiarius

Architecture
- Architect: Igino Pineschi
- Architectural type: Church
- Style: Modern
- Completed: 2004

The Church of Saint Romanus the Martyr (Italian: San Romano Martire, Latin: S. Romani Martyris) is a Roman Catholic titular church in Rome, Italy, in the Pietralata quarter.

== Storia ==
Built in 2004, the church is the seat of the parish of the same name, which was established in 1973 and entrusted to the Roman clergy. Until 2004, the parish was housed in some premises near Cave di Pietralata street.

It is dedicated to Saint Romanus the Martyr, celebrated on August 9.

The parish was established on February 6, 1973, by Cardinal Vicar Ugo Poletti's decree, "Neminem fugit". The parish territory was drawn from the nearby Sant'Atanasio parish.

== Cardinal Priest ==
Since February 14, 2015, it has served as the titular church for the Ethiopian Cardinal Berhaneyesus Demerew Souraphiel.
