= Apostolic Vicariate of Jimma–Bonga =

Catholic missionary jurisdiction in Ethiopia

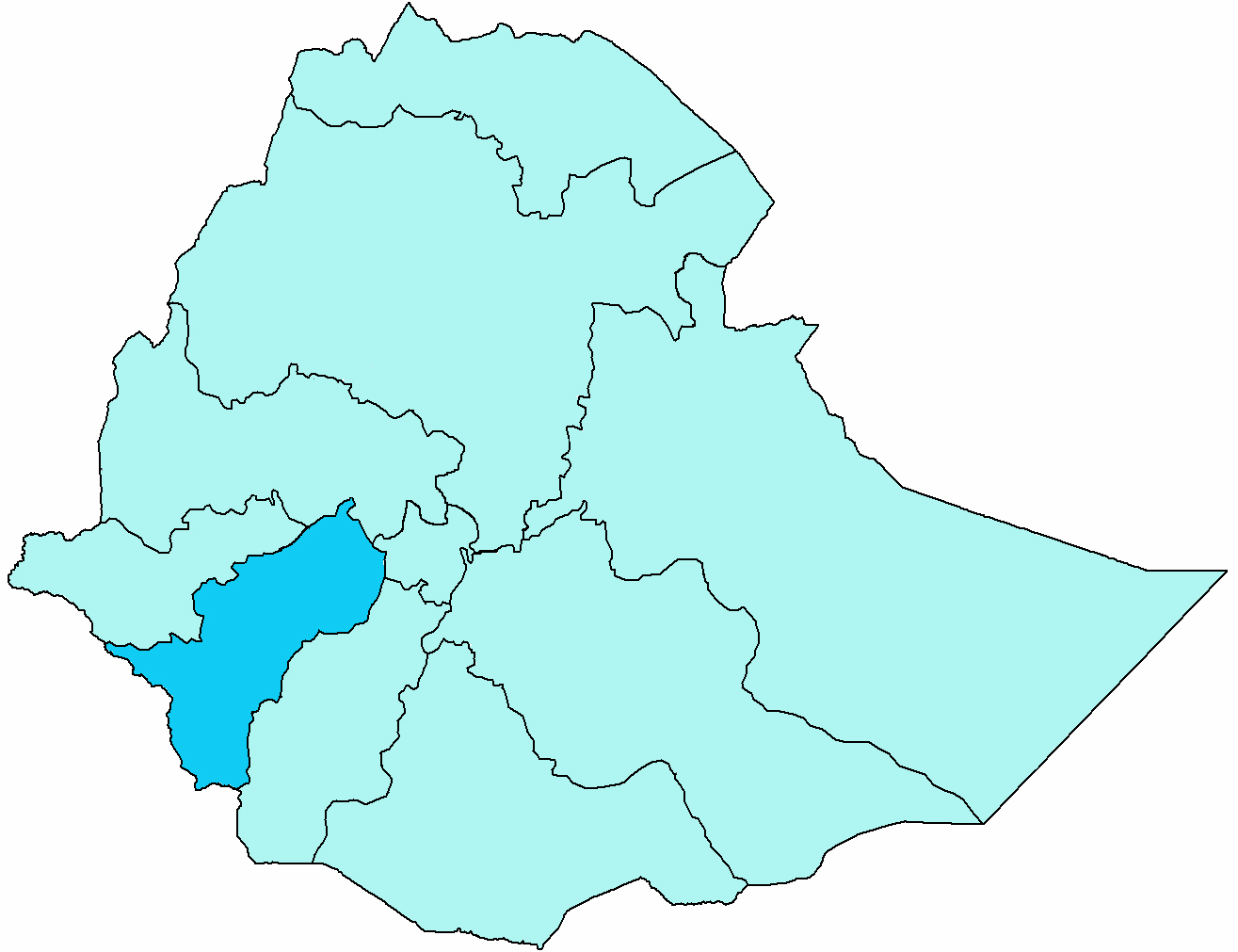
Map of the Apostolic Vicariate

The Apostolic Vicariate of Jimma–Bonga is a Roman Catholic pre-diocesan missionary jurisdiction in southwestern Ethiopia.

It is exempt, i.e. directly dependent on the Holy See (Roman missionary Congregation for the Evangelization of Peoples), not part of any ecclesiastical province.

Its episcopal see is the Pro-Cathedral Lideta Mariam, in Bonga town in Jimma, in the Keffa Zone of the Southern Nations, Nationalities and Peoples Region.

== History ==
Established on 1994.06.10 as Apostolic Prefecture of Jimma–Bonga (Gimma–Bonga in Curiate Italiano), on territory split off from the Apostolic Vicariate of Nekemte.

Lost territory on 2000.11.16 to establish the Apostolic Prefecture of Gambella.

Promoted on 2009.12.05 as Apostolic Vicariate of Jimma–Bonga.

== Ordinaries ==
(all Latin Church)

Apostolic Prefects of Jimma–Bonga

- Father Berhaneyesus Demerew Souraphiel, C.M. (1994 - 11.07.1997), appointed Apostolic Administrator of Addis Abeba (Ethiopian) (Cardinal in 2015)
- Father Theodorus van Ruijven (van Ruyven), C.M. (07.09.1998 - 07.23.2009), appointed Vicar Apostolic of Nekemte

Apostolic Vicars of Jimma–Bonga

- Markos Ghebremedhin, Lazarists (C.M.) (2009.12.05 – ...), Titular Bishop of Gummi in Proconsulari (2009.12.05 – ...)

Lideta Mariam Pro-Cathedral in Jimma is the seat of the Bishop of Vicariate of Jimma Bonga. The cathedral is built in 1994 in Ethiopian calendar by the then Father Berhaneyesus Demerew Souraphiel (Cardinal of Archeparchy of Addis Ababa).

== See also ==
- Roman Catholicism in Ethiopia
