= Tesfasellassie Medhin =

Ethiopian Catholic bishop (born 1953)

Most Reverend Tesfasellassie Medhin
- Bishop of Ethiopian Catholic Eparchy of Adigrat
- Church: Eastern Catholic Churches
- See: Adigrat
- Appointed: 16 Nov 2001

Orders
- Ordination: 4 Apr 1980
- Consecration: 20 Jan 2002 by Berhaneyesus Demerew Souraphiel CM

Personal details
- Born: 8 January 1953 (age 73) Alitena, Ethiopia
- Denomination: Ethiopian Catholic Church

Bishop Tesfasellassie Medhin (born 8 January 1953) is Ethiopian Catholic hierarch who served as a Bishop of Ethiopian Catholic Eparchy of Adigrat in Ethiopia.

== Early life ==
Medhin was born on 8 Jan 1953 in Alitena, Ethiopia.

== Religious life ==
He was ordained a priest on 4 April 1980. He was appointed Bishop of Adigrat (Ethiopian), Ethiopia on 16 November 2001 and consecrated on 20 January 2002.

In November 2021, Tesfaselassie Medhin denounced "a genocidal war" and criticized the joint report of the Ethiopian Human Rights Commission (EHRC) and the United Nations High Commissioner for Human Rights on the situation in the Tigray region.
