= Apostolic Vicariate of Nekemte =

Catholic missionary jurisdiction in Ethiopia

Apostolic Vicariate of Nekemte Vicariatus Apostolicus Nekemteensis

Location
- Country: Ethiopia
- Metropolitan: Immediately subject to the Holy See
- Headquarters: Nekemte, Oromia, Ethiopia

Statistics
- Area: 85,000 km^{2} (33,000 sq mi)
- Population: Total; Catholics: (as of 2022); 8,391,530; 48,800 (0.6%)
- Parishes: 22

Information
- Denomination: Catholic Church
- Sui iuris church: Latin Church
- Rite: Roman rite
- Established: 28 January 1913; 113 years ago
- Cathedral: Cathedral of Kidane Meheret
- Secular priests: 37

Current leadership
- Pope: Leo XIV
- Vicar Apostolic: Getahun Fanta Shikune, C.M.
- Bishops emeritus: Theodorus Van Ruijven, C.M.

Map
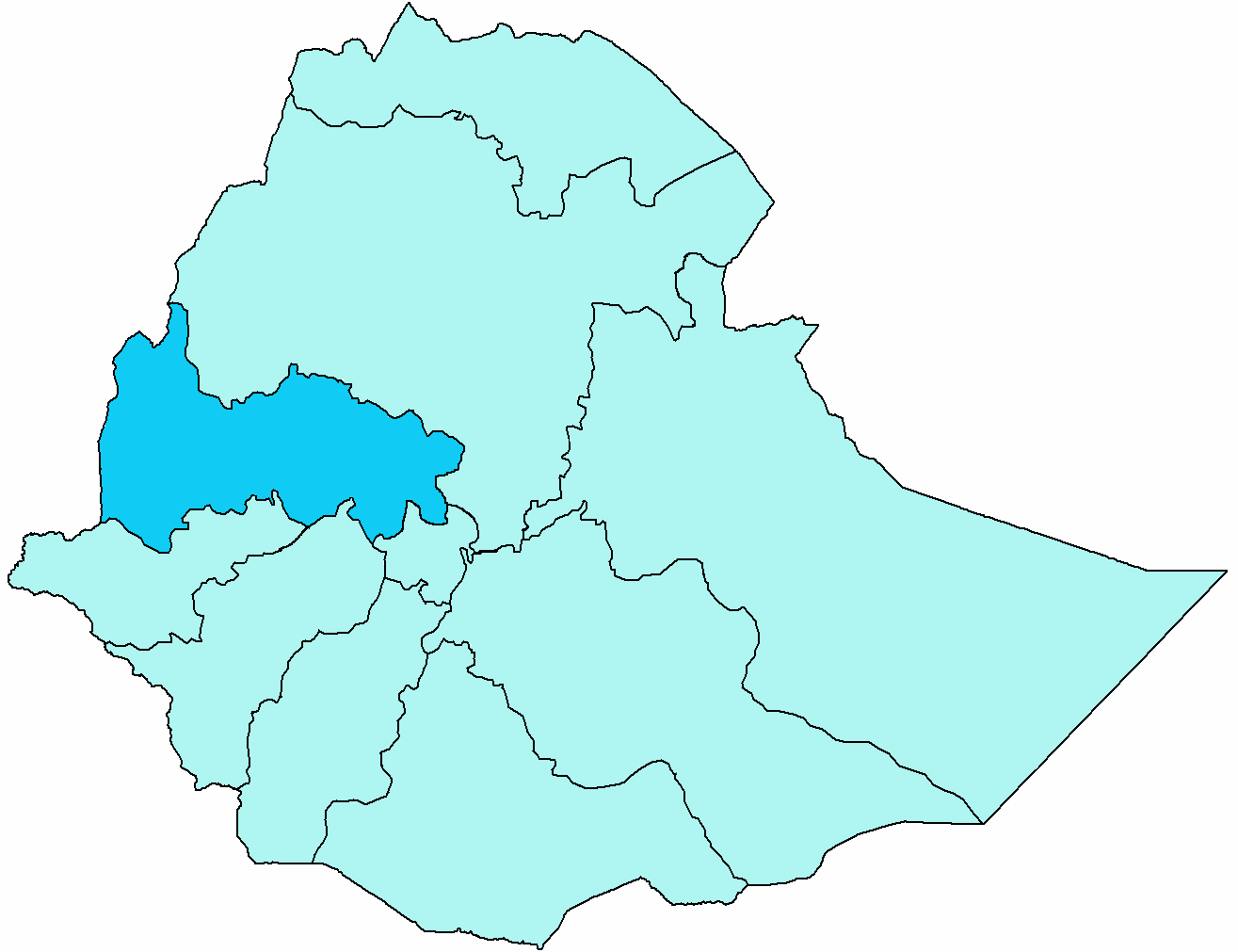

The Apostolic Vicariate of Nekemte (Latin: Vicariatus Apostolicus Nekemteensis) is a Roman Catholic apostolic vicariate (pre-diocesan jurisdiction) located in Nekemte, Ethiopia (where Orthodoxy and Islam are dominant).

The see is directly subject to the Holy See (not part of any ecclesiastical province) and its Roman Congregation for the Evangelization of Peoples. Its seat is the Cathedral of Kidane Meheret, in Nekemte.

The Vicariate Apostolic of Nekemte comprises the following:

Oromia region:

1. East Welega zone
2. West Welega zone
3. Kelem Welega zone
4. Horo Guduru wollega zone
5. West Showa Zone

Benishangul Gumuz Region:

1. Assosa zone
2. Kamashi zone

== History ==
- 28 January 1913: Established as Apostolic Prefecture of Southern Kaffa / Kaffa Meridionale (Italiano), on territory split off from the Apostolic Vicariate of Galla
- 8 September 1913: Renamed as Apostolic Prefecture of Kaffa
- 25 March 1937: Promoted as Apostolic Vicariate of Gimma, hence entitled to a titular bishop, having lost territory to establish the Apostolic Prefecture of Neghelli
- Lost territories on 13 February 1940 to establish Apostolic Prefecture of Hosanna and Apostolic Prefecture of Endeber
- 3 September 1982: Renamed after its see as Apostolic Vicariate of Nekemte / Nekemteën(sis) (Latin)
- Lost territory on 10 June 1994 to establish Apostolic Prefecture of Jimma–Bonga.

== Statistics ==
As per 2022, it pastorally served 48,800 Latin Catholics (0.6% of 8,391,530 total) on 85,000 km² in 22 parishes with 37 priests (26 diocesan, 11 religious), 1 deacon and 65 lay religious (15 brothers, 50 sisters).

== Leadership ==
Apostolic Prefect of Southern Kaffa

- Father Gaudenzio Barlassina, I.M.C. (6 May 1913 – 8 September 1913)

Apostolic Prefects of Kaffa

- Father Gaudenzio Barlassina, I.M.C. (8 September 1913 – 1933), resigned
- Fr. Luigi Santa, I.M.C. (14 July 1934 – 15 March 1937)

Apostolic Vicars of Gimma

- Luigi Santa, I.M.C. (15 March, 1937 – November 1943), appointed Auxiliary Bishop of Rimini
  - Apostolic Administrator Urbain-Marie Person, O.F.M. Cap. (1952 – 1958)
  - Apostolic Administrator Fr. Frans Janssen, C.M. (1958 – 21 May 1959)
- Frans Janssen, C.M. (see above 21 May 1959 – 4 July 1972), resigned
  - Apostolic Administrator Fr. Herman Wilhelm Teuben, C.M. (1972 – 17 December 1977)
- Hendrik Joseph Alois Bomers, C.M. (17 December 1977 – 3 September 1982)

Apostolic Vicars of Nekemte

- Hendrik Joseph Alois Bomers, C.M. (3 September 1982 – 19 October 1983), appointed Coadjutor Bishop of Haarlem
- Fikre-Mariam Ghemetchu, C.M. (28 October 1985 – 18 January 1994), resigned
- Leonardus Dobbelaar, C.M. (10 June 1994 – 21 March 2008)
  - Apostolic Administrator Theodorus Van Ruijven, C.M. (July 2008 – 23 July 2009)
- Theodorus Van Ruijven, C.M. (see above 23 July 2009 – 10 November 2013), retired
- Varghese Thottamkara, C.M. (10 November 2013 – 10 May 2023), appointed Bishop of Balasore
  - Apostolic Administrator Girma Tesfaye Gari (10 May 2023 – 22 September 2024)
- Getahun Fanta Shikune, C.M. (16 July 2024 – Present)

=== Coadjutor Vicar Apostolic ===
- Varghese Thottamkara, C.M. (28 June 2013 - 10 November 2013)

== See also ==
- List of Catholic dioceses in Ethiopia
