= Deaths in May 2008 =

The following is a list of notable deaths in May 2008.

Entries for each day are listed alphabetically by surname. A typical entry lists information in the following sequence:

- Name, age, country of citizenship at birth, subsequent country of citizenship (if applicable), reason for notability, cause of death (if known), and reference.

== May 2008 ==
=== 1 ===
- Aden Ayro, Somalian politician and Al-Shabaab member, airstrike.
- Paulo Amaral, 84, Brazilian football player (Flamengo) and coach (Juventus).
- SM Nasimuddin SM Amin, 54, Malaysian entrepreneur and founder of Naza, lung cancer.
- Bernard Archard, 91, British actor (Krull, Doctor Who, Emmerdale).
- Buzzie Bavasi, 93, American baseball executive (Dodgers, Angels, Padres).
- Mary Berry, 90, British musicologist and nun.
- Philipp von Boeselager, 90, German World War II anti-Hitler conspirator.
- Nirmala Deshpande, 78, Indian peace activist, after brief illness.
- Elaine Dundy, 86, American writer and actress.
- Jim Hager, 61, American country music singer and television actor (Hee Haw), heart attack.
- Mark Kendall, 49, British footballer (Spurs, Newport, Wolves).
- Sir Anthony Mamo, 99, Maltese politician, first president of the Republic of Malta.
- Alberto Estima de Oliveira, 74, Portuguese poet.
- Deborah Jeane Palfrey, 52, American escort agency proprietor, suicide by hanging.
- Marcel Van Der Auwera, 84, Belgian fencer.
- J. J. Voskuil, 81, Dutch novelist.

=== 2 ===
- Josephine Apieu Jenaro Aken, 53, South Sudanese civil servant, plane crash.
- Robert Brachtenbach, 77, American jurist, Washington State Supreme Court justice (1972–1994), throat cancer.
- Carole Dekeijser, 48, Belgian painter, lung cancer.
- Dominic Dim Deng, 58, Sudanese politician, defence minister for Southern Sudan, plane crash.
- Bob Isaac, 80, American politician, mayor of Colorado Springs, Colorado (1979–1997), pneumonia.
- Sergio Lauricella, 86, Italian Olympic bronze medal-winning (1948) composer.
- Mildred Loving, 68, American civil rights pioneer, challenged Virginia interracial marriage law (Loving v. Virginia).
- Ilyas Malayev, 72, Uzbekistani musician and poet, pancreatic cancer.
- Beverlee McKinsey, 72, American actress (Another World, Guiding Light, Bronco Billy), complications from kidney transplant.
- Izold Pustõlnik, 70, Ukrainian-born Estonian astronomer.
- Daniel Sekhoto, 37, South African football player.
- Marion Simmons, 59, British judge, cancer.
- Mike Titcomb, 75, British rugby union referee, kidney failure.
- Frank Y. Whiteley Jr., 93, American thoroughbred racehorse trainer (Ruffian).
- Justin Yak, Sudanese politician, minister for cabinet affairs for Southern Sudan (2006–2007), plane crash.

=== 3 ===
- Charles Caccia, 78, Canadian politician, environmentalist, Liberal MP for Davenport (1968–2004), complications of stroke.
- Leopoldo Calvo-Sotelo, 82, Spanish prime minister (1981–1982), natural causes.
- Eight Belles, 3, American racehorse, 2008 Kentucky Derby 2nd-place finisher, euthanized.
- Martin Finnegan, 28, Irish motorbike racer, race crash.
- Fay Gale, 75, Australian cultural geographer.
- Lynne Cooper Harvey, 92, American radio producer, Radio Hall of Fame member, wife of Paul Harvey, leukemia.
- Ted Key, 95, American cartoonist (Hazel), bladder cancer and stroke.
- Hanon Reznikov, 57, American playwright.
- Morgan Sparks, 91, American engineer, inventor of the first practical bipolar junction transistor.
- Ngũgĩ wa Mirii, 57, Kenyan playwright, car accident.

=== 4 ===
- Roger Aeschlimann, 84, Swiss cyclist.
- John Altieri, 38, American actor (Jersey Boys), pneumonia.
- Fred Baur, 89, American chemist, inventor of the Pringles can.
- Alvin Colt, 92, American Tony Award-winning costume designer (On the Town, Guys and Dolls, Pipe Dream, Li'l Abner).
- John Greenwood, 57, British businessman and catering executive, motor neurone disease.
- Fred Haines, 72, American screenwriter and film director, lung cancer.
- Richard Holme, Baron Holme of Cheltenham, 71, British Liberal Democrat politician, cancer.
- Kishan Maharaj, 84, Indian musician, leading exponent of the Benares gharana tabla, stroke.
- Colin Murdoch, 79, New Zealand inventor of the disposable hypodermic syringe and the tranquilizer gun, cancer.

=== 5 ===
- Sam Aubrey, 85, American basketball player and coach (Oklahoma State Cowboys).
- Thomas Boggs, 63, American drummer (Box Tops), owner of Huey's Restaurants.
- Hugh Bradner, 92, American scientist credited with inventing the wetsuit, complications of pneumonia.
- Pak Kyongni, 82, South Korean novelist, lung cancer.
- Irv Robbins, 90, American businessman, co-founder of the Baskin-Robbins ice cream chain.
- Zvonko Sabolović, 84, Yugoslav Olympic sprinter.
- Alma Hogan Snell, 85, American Crow tribal nation historian, herbalist, granddaughter of Pretty Shield.
- Jerry Wallace, 79, American country music singer, heart failure.
- Witold Woyda, 68, Polish fencer, double gold medallist at the 1972 Summer Olympics, lung cancer.

=== 6 ===
- John Jay Iselin, 74, American public television innovator, descendant of John Jay, pneumonia.
- Franz Jackson, 95, American saxophonist.
- Harvey Karman, 84, American psychologist and women's reproductive health advocate, inventor of the Karman cannula, stroke.
- William Earl Lynd, 53, American convicted murderer, executed by lethal injection.
- Ray Michie, Baroness Michie of Gallanach, 74, British Liberal Democrat politician, cancer.
- D.C. Minner, 73, American blues musician.
- John Reames, 65, British football manager and administrator, cancer.
- Mark Saunders, 32, British barrister, shot by police.

=== 7 ===
- William Douglas Allen, 94, British physicist and electrical engineer.
- John Earle, 64, Irish saxophonist.
- Neeraj Grover, 26, Indian television executive and producer (Kya Aap Paanchvi Pass Se Tez Hain?), beaten.
- Rachel Hoffman, 23, American police informant, murdered.
- Clifford L. Jones, 80, American politician, Pennsylvania Republican Party chairman, prostate cancer.
- Donald Montrose, 84, American Roman Catholic prelate, Bishop of Stockton (1986–1999).
- Thijs Wöltgens, 64, Dutch politician, mayor of Kerkrade (1994–2000), senator (1995–2005).
- Gernot Zippe, 90, Austrian engineer.

=== 8 ===
- Al Bandari bint Abdulaziz Al Saud, 80, Saudi sister of King Abdullah of Saudi Arabia.
- Eddy Arnold, 89, American country music singer.
- Willem Brakman, 85, Dutch author.
- Ian Brodie, 72, British foreign correspondent (The Daily Telegraph).
- Jose Feria, 91, Filipino supreme court justice (1986–1987).
- Yasuharu Furuta, 93, Japanese Olympic hurdler.
- Murray Jarvik, 84, American academic and co-inventor of the nicotine patch, heart failure.
- Larry Levine, 80, American Grammy-winning audio engineer (Wall of Sound), emphysema.
- Luigi Malerba, 81, Italian writer.
- Édgar Eusebio Millán Gómez, 41, Mexican federal police anti-drug coordinator, shot.
- François Sterchele, 26, Belgian footballer (Belgium, Club Brugge), car accident.

=== 9 ===
- James Atkinson, 92, British physicist.
- Firoz Dastur, 89, Indian Hindustani classical musician (Kirana Gharana), anaemia.
- Jack Gibson, 79, Australian rugby league player and coach, selected as "Coach of the Century".
- Judy Grable, 72, American female professional wrestler.
- Shmuel Katz, 93, Israeli writer, historian and journalist.
- Arthur Kroeger, 76, Canadian civil servant (1958–1992), academic and chancellor of Carleton University (1993–2002).
- Baptiste Manzini, 87, American football player.
- Nuala O'Faolain, 68, Irish journalist and author, lung cancer.
- Mamadou N'Diaye, 68, Senegalese Olympic sprinter.
- Ronald Parise, 56, American astronaut, brain tumor.
- Esteban Robles Espinosa, Mexican police commander, shot.
- Pascal Sevran, 62, French television presenter and producer, lyricist and writer, lung cancer.
- Sinan Sofuoğlu, 25, Turkish motorcycle racer, training crash.
- Artur da Távola, 72, Brazilian journalist, writer and politician, heart disease.

=== 10 ===
- Sir John Barraclough, 90, British air marshal.
- Leyla Gencer, 79, Turkish soprano opera singer, respiratory and cardiac failure.
- Paul Haeberlin, 84, French chef and restaurateur (L'Auberge de l'Ill).
- Jessica Jacobs, 17, Australian singer and actress (The Saddle Club), fell under train.
- Jimmy Mizen, 16, English schoolboy.
- Liao Feng-teh, 57, Taiwanese incoming interior minister, heart attack.
- Eusebio Ríos, 73, Spanish international footballer and coach.
- Mario Schiano, 74, Italian jazz saxophonist, after long Illness.
- Peter Thurnham, 69, British MP for Bolton North East (1983–1997), pancreatic cancer.

=== 11 ===
- Sir Austin Bide, 92, British chemist and industrialist.
- Markus Casey, 51, Irish archaeologist, plane crash.
- Sam Dauya, 70, Zimbabwean founder of Dynamos F.C. football team.
- Alema Leota, 80, American alleged organized crime leader, 1978 candidate for governor of Hawaii, injuries from car accident.
- Raymattja Marika, 49, Australian Yolngu scholar, linguist, educator and cultural advocate, heart attack.
- Bruno Neves, 26, Portuguese cyclist, crash during race.
- Dottie Rambo, 74, American gospel singer, bus crash.
- John Rutsey, 55, Canadian drummer (Rush), heart attack.
- Heather Stohler, 29, American model for Calvin Klein, fire.
- Dick Sutcliffe, 90, American animator, creator of Davey and Goliath, stroke.
- Jeff Torrington, 72, British novelist (Swing Hammer Swing), Parkinson's disease.
- Curtis Whitley, 39, American football player (San Diego Chargers, Carolina Panthers, Oakland Raiders).

=== 12 ===
- Seton Airlie, 88, Scottish footballer.
- Penny Banner, 73, American professional wrestler, cancer.
- David Daniels, 74, American poet.
- Oakley Hall, 87, American novelist (Warlock), kidney disease and cancer.
- Robert Hundar, 73, Italian actor (The Seven from Texas, Sabata, Everything Happens to Me).
- Lidiya Masterkova, 81, Russian-born French painter.
- Natural Blitz, 7–8, Australian-bred stallion.
- Robert Rauschenberg, 82, American pop artist (Erased de Kooning Drawing), heart failure.
- Bruce Sayers, 80, British electrical engineer.
- Irena Sendler, 98, Polish humanitarian, saved 2,500 Jewish children from the Warsaw Ghetto during World War II.

=== 13 ===
- Jill Adams, 77, British actress, cancer.
- Saad Al-Salim Al-Sabah, 78, Kuwaiti emir (2006).
- Dolores Alexander, 76, American feminist, writer, and reporter.
- Charles Gary Allison, 69–70, American screenwriter and film producer.
- Lucius D. Battle, 89, American ambassador to Egypt (1964–1967), Parkinson's disease.
- Bernardin Gantin, 86, Beninese cardinal of the Roman Catholic Church.
- John Phillip Law, 70, American actor (Barbarella).
- Larry McKeon, 63, American politician, first openly gay member of the Illinois General Assembly, stroke.
- Colea Răutu, 95, Romanian actor, cirrhosis.
- Ron Stone, 72, American news anchor (KHOU, KPRC in Houston), prostate cancer.
- Costică Toma, 80, Romanian football goalkeeper (Romania, Steaua București).
- Maheswary Velautham, Sri Lankan lawyer and activist, shot.
- Roger Harold Metford Warner, 95, British antiques dealer.

=== 14 ===
- Frith Banbury, 96, British stage director and actor, liver cancer.
- Dagmar Barnouw, 72, German cultural historian.
- Arthur Burks, 92, American mathematician and computer pioneer, Alzheimer's disease.
- Warren Cowan, 87, American publicist, cancer.
- Roger Ellis, 70, American football player, cancer.
- John Forbes-Robertson, 80, British actor.
- Derek Goodwin, 88, British ornithologist.
- Roy Heath, 81, Guyanese writer.
- Jay Morago, 90, American governor of the Gila River Indian Community (1954–1960), cancer.
- Tonderai Ndira, 33, Zimbabwean political dissident, murdered.
- Yuri Rytkheu, 78, Russian Chukchi language writer.
- Mário Schoemberger, 56, Brazilian film, television and stage actor, cancer.
- Richard David Vine, 82, American diplomat, ambassador to Switzerland (1979–1981).

=== 15 ===
- Del Ankers, 91, American cinematographer and photographer (Muppets commercials).
- Henry Austin, 88, Indian diplomat and politician, ambassador to Portugal.
- Tommy Burns, 51, Scottish football player and manager (Celtic, Kilmarnock, Reading), melanoma.
- Tove Billington Bye, 79, Norwegian politician.
- Alexander Courage, 88, American television composer (Star Trek, The Waltons) and orchestrator (Jurassic Park).
- Anthony Denness, 71, English cricketer.
- Walt Dickerson, 80, American vibraphonist, cardiac arrest.
- Robert Dunlop, 47, British motorcycle racer, chest injuries.
- Will Elder, 86, American comic book artist (Mad, Little Annie Fanny), Parkinson's disease.
- Bob Florence, 75, American jazz composer and arranger, pneumonia.
- Richard Funkhouser, 90, American geologist and diplomat, ambassador to Gabon (1969-1970), suicide by gunshot.
- Youssef Idilbi, 32, Dutch actor, suicide by jumping.
- Willis Lamb, 94, American physicist, Nobel laureate in physics (1955), complications of gallstone disorder.
- Earl Leggett, 75, American football player and coach.
- Yanks Music, 14, American Thoroughbred racehorse, euthanized.
- Morsal Obeidi, 16, German-Afghan murder victim, honour killing.

=== 16 ===
- Charles J. Adams, 91, American politician.
- Aonosato Sakari, 72, Japanese sumo wrestler.
- William Blease, Baron Blease, 93, British politician.
- Henry Canoy, 84, Filipino businessman, founder of Radio Mindanao Network.
- Sandy Howard, 80, American film and television producer (A Man Called Horse), Alzheimer's disease.
- David Mitton, 69, British animation director (Thomas & Friends, Thunderbirds), heart attack.
- Robert Mondavi, 94, American winemaker, benefactor of the Mondavi Center, member of the California Hall of Fame.
- Igor Polyakov, 95, Russian rower, 1952 Olympic silver medalist.
- Marc Rabémila, 70, Malagasy Olympic athlete.
- Jimmy Slyde, 80, American tap dancer.
- Peter Rolfe Vaughan, 73, English scientist, heart attack.

=== 17 ===
- Jolyon Brettingham Smith, 58, British composer, musicologist and radio presenter.
- John Fitzsimmons, 68, British Roman Catholic priest and broadcaster, after long illness.
- Thomas Flatley, 76, American real estate tycoon and philanthropist, amyotrophic lateral sclerosis.
- Zélia Gattai, 91, Brazilian writer and novelist, wife of Jorge Amado.
- Wilfrid Mellers, 94, British composer and author.
- D. Aubrey Moodie, 99, Canadian politician.
- Jack Rayner, 87, Australian rugby league player.
- Sophan Sophiaan, 64, Indonesian actor and politician, motorcycle accident.
- Joyce Trimmer, 80, Canadian politician, mayor of Scarborough, Ontario (1988–1994), cancer.
- Lionel Van Deerlin, 93, American politician and journalist, representative from California (1963–1981).

=== 18 ===
- Lionel Algama, 73, Sri Lankan singer, composer and a musician.
- Pietro Cascella, 87, Italian contemporary artist.
- Irma Córdoba, 94, Argentine actress, natural causes.
- Jonathan James, 24, American cyber criminal.
- John Lucas, 85, Barbadian-born Canadian cricketer.
- Lloyd Moore, 95, American NASCAR driver (1949–1955).
- Elemore Morgan Jr., 76, American landscape artist.
- Jack Norris, 99, American football player.
- Joseph Pevney, 96, American television and film director (Bonanza, Star Trek, The Paper Chase, Trapper John, M.D.).

=== 19 ===
- Nigel Cassidy, 62, British footballer.
- Larry Coutre, 80, American football player (Green Bay Packers).
- Jack Duffy, 81, Canadian comedian, natural causes.
- Chaim Flom, 56, Israeli scholar and rosh yeshiva.
- Huntington Hartford, 97, American businessman and philanthropist.
- Barclay Howard, 55, British golfer.
- Rimma Kazakova, 76, Russian poet.
- Mariam McGlone, 92, American dancer and choreographer.
- Kjell Kristian Rike, 63, Norwegian sports commentator.
- André Schlupp, 78, French Olympic basketball player.
- Vijay Tendulkar, 80, Indian playwright, myasthenia gravis.

=== 20 ===
- Iona Banks, 87, British actress (Pobol y Cwm).
- Crispin Beltran, 75, Filipino congressman and labor leader, head injuries from a fall.
- Viktor Bortsov, 73, Russian actor, intestinal cancer.
- Margot Boyd, 94, British actress (The Archers).
- Thomas Burlison, Baron Burlison, 71, British footballer and trade unionist.
- Charles William John Eliot, 79, Canadian academic administrator, president of the University of Prince Edward Island (1985–1995), complications of a stroke.
- Joachim Erwin, 58, German politician, mayor of Düsseldorf, colorectal cancer.
- Gonzalo Figueroa Garcia Huidobro, 77, Chilean archaeologist.
- Herb Hash, 97, American baseball pitcher (Boston Red Sox), stroke.
- Harald Hein, 58, German Olympic fencer.
- Zelma Henderson, 88, American last surviving plaintiff in Brown v. Board of Education, pancreatic cancer.
- Hamilton Jordan, 63, American politician, Jimmy Carter's White House chief of staff (1979–1980), mesothelioma.
- Baine Kerr, 88, American lawyer and oil executive.
- Cy Leonard, 82, Canadian ventriloquist.
- Ali Sadikin, 80, Indonesian politician, governor of Jakarta (1966–1977), liver cancer.
- S. K. Trimurti, 96, Indonesian journalist, first minister of labor and employment, natural causes.

=== 21 ===
- Bert André, 66, Dutch actor (Flodder), intracranial hemorrhage
- Earl Wesley Berry, 49, American convicted murderer, execution by lethal injection.
- Mel Casson, 87, American cartoonist (Redeye).
- Brian Keenan, 66, Irish IRA commander, cancer.
- Ted Lanyon, 68, Canadian ice hockey player.
- Michelle Meldrum, 39, American rock guitarist (Phantom Blue, Meldrum), cystic growth on the brain.
- John Aloysius Morgan, 98, Australian Roman Catholic prelate.
- Siegmund Nissel, 86, German-born British violinist (Amadeus Quartet).
- Bartolomeu Cid dos Santos, 77, Portuguese artist and engraver, long illness.
- Torcato Sepúlveda, 57, Portuguese journalist.
- Jeheskel Shoshani, 65, Israeli-born American elephant expert, bus explosion.

=== 22 ===
- Melek Amet, 47, Romanian model, ovarian cancer.
- Robert Asprin, 61, American science fiction and fantasy writer (MythAdventures), heart attack.
- Charlie Booth, 104, Australian athlete, inventor of the starting block.
- Harry Lange, 77, German production designer and art director (2001: A Space Odyssey, Star Wars, The Dark Crystal), BAFTA winner (1969).
- Jack Mildren, 58, American football player, Oklahoma's lieutenant governor (1990–1995), stomach cancer.
- Luca Milesi, 84, Italian-born Eritrean Catholic hierarch, bishop of Barentu (1995–2001).
- Paul Patrick, 58, British gay rights activist, chronic lung condition.
- Hana Maria Pravda, 90, Czech actress and Holocaust survivor.
- Tubby T, 33, British dancehall/garage musician, stroke.

=== 23 ===
- Nigel Anderson, 88, British soldier, landowner, and politician.
- Alan Brien, 83, British journalist and critic.
- Cornell Capa, 90, American photographer, founder of the International Center of Photography.
- Roberto Freire, 81, Brazilian writer and psychiatrist, created somatherapy.
- Dritan Hoxha, 39, Albanian businessman, car accident.
- Thelma Keane, 82, Australian-born American who inspired husband Bil's comic strip The Family Circus, Alzheimer's disease.
- Heinz Kwiatkowski, 81, German footballer, member of 1954 FIFA World Cup-winning team.
- Iñaki Ochoa de Olza, 40, Spanish mountaineer and alpinist, pulmonary edema while climbing Annapurna.
- Jefferson Peres, 76, Brazilian senator from Amazonas, heart attack.
- Utah Phillips, 73, American folk singer and political activist, heart failure.
- Keith Rosewarne, 83, Australian footballer.
- Jack Smith, 72, English football player (Hartlepool United, Swindon Town, Margate) and manager.

=== 24 ===
- Adam Baruch, 63, Israeli journalist, writer and art critic, diabetes complications.
- Bob Beck, 63, Guamanian zoologist and conservationist, worked to save Guam rail native birds.
- Tano Cimarosa, 86, Italian actor (Cinema Paradiso, The Day of the Owl, Bread and Chocolate).
- Reg Flewin, 87, British footballer.
- Rob Knox, 18, British actor (Harry Potter and the Half-Blood Prince), stabbed.
- Eugenio Garza Lagüera, 84, Mexican businessman, president of FEMSA, natural causes.
- Isaac Lipschits, 77, Dutch political scientist and historian, natural causes.
- Dick Martin, 86, American comedian (Rowan & Martin's Laugh-In), respiratory complications.
- Jimmy McGriff, 72, American jazz and blues organist, multiple sclerosis.
- Sonny Okosun, 61, Nigerian musician, colon cancer.

=== 25 ===
- Nadia Arslan, 59, Lebanese actress, breast cancer.
- Louise Firouz, 74, American horse breeder.
- George Garrett, 78, American novelist and poet, cancer.
- Geremi González, 33, Venezuelan MLB baseball player, lightning strike.
- James D. Griffin, 78, American mayor of Buffalo, New York (1978–1994), Creutzfeldt–Jakob disease.
- Bukhuti Gurgenidze, 74, Georgian chess grandmaster.
- Ítalo Argentino Lúder, 91, Argentine acting president (1975).
- Tom McHale, 45, American football player (Tampa Bay Buccaneers).
- Mitch Mullany, 39, American comedian and actor (Nick Freno: Licensed Teacher, The Wayans Bros., The Sweetest Thing), diabetes-related stroke.
- J. R. Simplot, 99, American businessman, original McDonald's french fries supplier.
- Olaf Sørensen, 90, Danish Olympic runner.
- Ernst Stuhlinger, 94, German-born American rocket scientist.
- Camu Tao, 30, American rapper-producer, lung cancer.
- Kenneth H. Wood, 90, American author and administrator, editor of the Adventist Review, heart failure.

=== 26 ===
- Dolly Aglay, 41, Filipino financial journalist, cancer.
- Jerry C. Begay, 83, American Navajo code talker and World War II veteran.
- Dick Evans, 90, American football player (Green Bay Packers, Chicago Cardinals).
- Hans Haasmann, 92, Dutch Olympic diver Hans Haasmann Bio, Stats, and Results | Olympics at Sports-Reference.com
- Earle Hagen, 88, American film and television theme composer (The Andy Griffith Show, The Mod Squad, I Spy).
- Howlin' Dave, 52, Filipino radio disc jockey and proponent of Pinoy rock, stroke.
- John Hulme, 63, English footballer (Bolton Wanderers, Reading, Bury).
- Roy Koerner, 75, British polar scientist and explorer.
- Yuriy Konovalov, 78, Soviet-born Azerbaijani Olympic track athlete, 4 × 100 m relay silver medallist (1956 and 1960).
- Donald L. Pilling, 64, American admiral, Vice Chief of Naval Operations (1997–2000), leukemia.
- Sydney Pollack, 73, American film director and actor (Tootsie, Out of Africa, Michael Clayton), Oscar winner (1986), stomach cancer.
- Alan Renouf, 89, Australian head of DFAT, ambassador to United States (1977–1979), France and Yugoslavia, leukemia.
- Kermit Scott, 71, American philosophy professor, namesake of Kermit the Frog.
- Robert G. Voight, 87, American academic.

=== 27 ===
- Ed Arno, 91, Austrian-American cartoonist, caricaturist, illustrator and comics artist.
- Valmae Beck, 64, Australian child murderer, complications of heart surgery.
- Tony Hussein Hinde, 55, Australian-born Maldivian surfer, heart attack.
- Jim Kerr, 68, American professional football player (Washington Redskins)
- Franz Künstler, 107, German World War I veteran, last known surviving veteran of the Central Powers.
- Hubert Macey, 87, Canadian ice hockey player (Montreal Canadiens, New York Rangers).
- Per Nielsen, 88, Danish Olympic shooter.
- Gabisile Nkosi, 34, South African artist, printmaker and activist, murdered
- Mick Nolan, 58, Australian footballer, cancer.
- Abram Raselemane, 30, South African footballer, apparent suicide by hanging.
- Alejandro Romualdo, 82, Peruvian poet.

=== 28 ===
- Beryl Cook, 81, British painter.
- Sven Davidson, 79, Swedish tennis player.
- Robert H. Justman, 81, American television and film producer (Star Trek), Parkinson's disease.
- Elinor Lyon, 86, British children's writer.
- Danny Moss, 80, British jazz tenor saxophonist.
- Nashoba's Key, 5, American racehorse, euthanized.
- Dianne Odell, 61, American author with polio, power failure to iron lung.
- Erin Spanevello, 21, Canadian fashion model, drug overdose.

=== 29 ===
- Paula Gunn Allen, 68, Native American poet, novelist, and activist, lung cancer.
- José Alejandro Bernales, 59, Chilean director general of Carabineros de Chile, helicopter crash.
- Luc Bourdon, 21, Canadian ice hockey player, motorcycle accident.
- Romeo A. Brawner, 72, Filipino appeals court judge (1995–2005), election commissioner (2005–2008), heart attack.
- Len Devine, 84, Australian politician, MP for East Sydney (1963–1969).
- Harvey Korman, 81, American actor and comedian (Blazing Saddles, The Carol Burnett Show, The Flintstones), four-time Emmy winner, abdominal aortic aneurysm.
- Donald MacLeod, 75, New Zealand cricketer.

=== 30 ===
- Harry Brautigam, 59, Nicaraguan president of the BCIE since 2003, heart problem after air crash.
- Campbell Burnap, 68, British jazz trombonist, cancer.
- Harlan Cleveland, 90, American diplomat, educator and author, ambassador to NATO (1965–1969), natural causes.
- Rodney Gordon, 75, British architect.
- John W. Keys, 66, American government official, commissioner of the United States Bureau of Reclamation (2001-2006), plane crash.
- Graeme Miller, 67, Australian cricketer.
- Noel Moore, 79, British civil servant, leader of decimalisation project, brain tumour.
- Chris Morgan, 55, British journalist, apparent suicide in front of a train.
- William Eldridge Odom, 75, American Army Lieutenant General and director of the National Security Agency.
- Lorenzo Odone, 30, American ALD patient portrayed in the film Lorenzo's Oil.
- Mike Scott, 75, British television producer and presenter.
- Boris Shakhlin, 76, Russian-born Ukrainian gymnast, winner of seven Olympic gold medals for the Soviet Union, cardiac arrest.
- Suprakash Som, 60, Indian cricketer.
- Nat Temple, 94, British bandleader.

=== 31 ===
- Carlos Alhinho, 59, Portuguese international footballer, fall.
- John Ambler, 83, British businessman.
- Joe Axelson, 80, American executive and general manager of the National Basketball Association Sacramento Kings.
- Nusret Çolpan, 56, Turkish painter and architect.
- Detlef Gromoll, 70, American mathematician, brain hemorrhage.
- Nelly Láinez, 88, Argentine actress, urinary infection.
- Per-Erik Larsson, 79, Swedish skier.
- Charles Moskos, 74, American sociologist, architect of the US military DADT gay and lesbian policy, cancer.
- Paul Thomson, 91, American botanist, co-founder of the California Rare Fruit Growers Association.
- Allan Wiles, 87, New Zealand cricketer.
