= Begay =

Begay is a surname, derived from the Navajo word biyeʼ [pìjèʔ] meaning "his/her son".

Begay may also refer to:

- Apie Begay, Navajo painter
- Arthur C. Begay (1932–2010), Navajo painter
- Carlyle Begay, Arizona State Senator
- D.Y. Begay (born 1953), Navajo textile artist
- Edward T. Begay (1935–2022), politician
- Fred Begay (1932–2013), nuclear physicist
- Harrison Begay (1914 or 1917–2012), artist
- Jerry C. Begay (1924–2008), soldier
- Keats Begay (1923–1987), Navajo painter
- Notah Begay III (born 1972), professional golfer
- Shonto Begay (born 1954), Navajo artist
- Joyce Begay-Foss, Navajo weaver

== See also ==
- Begaye
- Begay v. United States
- Notah Begay III Foundation Challenge
