= May 2 =

May 2 this year in various calendars
- Saturday, 2 May 2026
Akan	Kurumemene
Armenian	16 Mareri 1475
Aztec	Xocotlhuetzi 12, 9 Xōchitl
Babylonian	14 Nisanu, 2337 SE
Balinese pawukon	Luang, Pepet, Pasah, Menala, Wage, Paniron, Saniscara of Kulantir, Yama, Urungan, Duka
Bengali	19 Boisakh, BS 1433
Chinese	Yang Fire Rat・Root Mansion; Fire Horse Year, Month 3, Day 16 (Guyu, 3 days until Lixia)
Common Era	2 May 2026 CE
Coptic	24 Parmouti, AM 1742
Egyptian	16 Thoth, 2775 NE
Ethiopian	24 Miyāzyā, 2018 Amätä Məhrät
French Republican	Décade II, Tridi de Floréal de l'Année 234 de la République
Gregorian	2 May, AD 2026
Hebrew	15 Iyar, AM 5786; Omer 30
Hindu	Viśākhā・Vyatīpāta; Solar: 19 Vaiśākha, 1948 SE; Lunisolar: Pratipada, Kṛishna pakṣa of Vaiśākha, 2083 VE; Rāudra・5127 KY・1,872,697
Icelandic	Laugardagur, 10 Harpa 2026
Islamic	15 Dhu al-Qi'dah, AH 1447 (using tabular method)
ISO week date	2026-W18-6
Japanese	16 Yayoi, Reiwa 8 (Kokuu, 3 days until Rikka)
Julian	19 April, AD 2026 (AM 7534)
Julian day	2461163
Korean	16 Yongdal, 4359 DE
Maya	13.0.13.10.0; 13 Uo, 9 Ahau
Roman	ante diem XIII Kalendas Maias, MMDCCLXXIX AUC
Solar Hijri	12 Ordibehesht, SH 1405
Tibetan	16 nag pa, me pho rta 2153 or 1772 or 1000

<<	May					>>
Su	Mo	Tu	We	Th	Fr	Sa
					1	2
3	4	5	6	7	8	9
10	11	12	13	14	15	16
17	18	19	20	21	22	23
24	25	26	27	28	29	30
31
2026

May 2 in recent years
2026 (Saturday)
2025 (Friday)
2024 (Thursday)
2023 (Tuesday)
2022 (Monday)
2021 (Sunday)
2020 (Saturday)
2019 (Thursday)
2018 (Wednesday)
2017 (Tuesday)

May 2 is the 122nd day of the year (123rd in leap years) in the Gregorian calendar; 243 days remain until the end of the year.

== Events ==
=== Pre-1600 ===
- 1194 – King Richard I of England gives Portsmouth its first royal charter.
- 1230 – William de Braose is hanged by Prince Llywelyn the Great.
- 1250 – Mamluks under Baybars murder the Ayyubid sultan Turanshah for fear of losing their privileges.
- 1388 – The surrender of the Acropolis of Athens to Nerio Acciaioli ends the Catalan presence in the Duchy of Athens.
- 1536 – Anne Boleyn, Queen of England, is arrested and imprisoned on charges of adultery, incest, treason and witchcraft.
- 1559 – John Knox returns from exile to Scotland to become the leader of the nascent Scottish Reformation.
- 1568 – Mary, Queen of Scots, escapes from Lochleven Castle.

=== 1601–1900 ===
- 1611 – The King James Version of the Bible is published for the first time in London, England, by printer Robert Barker.
- 1625 – Afonso Mendes, appointed by Pope Gregory XV as Latin Patriarch of Ethiopia, arrives at Beilul from Goa.
- 1670 – King Charles II of England grants a permanent charter to the Hudson's Bay Company to open up the fur trade in North America.
- 1808 – Outbreak of the Peninsular War: The people of Madrid rise up in rebellion against French occupation. Francisco de Goya later memorializes this event in his painting The Second of May 1808.
- 1812 – The Siege of Cuautla during the Mexican War of Independence ends with both sides claiming victory.
- 1829 – After anchoring nearby, Captain Charles Fremantle of HMS Challenger declares the Swan River Colony in Australia.
- 1863 – American Civil War: Stonewall Jackson is wounded by friendly fire while returning to camp after reconnoitering during the Battle of Chancellorsville. He succumbs to pneumonia eight days later.
- 1866 – Peruvian defenders fight off the Spanish fleet at the Battle of Callao.
- 1867 – Albert Günther publishes the first study to recognise that the New Zealand tuatara is not a lizard.
- 1876 – The April Uprising breaks out in Ottoman Bulgaria.
- 1885 – Cree and Assiniboine warriors win the Battle of Cut Knife, their largest victory over Canadian forces during the North-West Rebellion.
- 1889 – Menelik II, Emperor of Ethiopia, signs the Treaty of Wuchale, giving Italy control over Eritrea.

=== 1901–present ===
- 1906 – Closing ceremony of the Intercalated Games in Athens, Greece.
- 1920 – The first game of the Negro National League baseball is played in Indianapolis.
- 1933 – Germany's independent labor unions are replaced by the German Labour Front.
- 1941 – World War II: Following the coup d'état against Iraq Crown Prince 'Abd al-Ilah earlier that year, the United Kingdom launches the Anglo-Iraqi War to restore him to power.
- 1945 – World War II: The Soviet Union announces the fall of Berlin.
- 1945 – World War II: The surrender of Caserta comes into effect, by which German troops in Italy cease fighting.
- 1945 – World War II: The US 82nd Airborne Division liberates Wöbbelin concentration camp finding 1,000 dead prisoners, most of whom starved to death.
- 1945 – World War II: A death march from Dachau to the Austrian border is halted by the segregated, all-Nisei 522nd Field Artillery Battalion of the U.S. Army in southern Bavaria, saving several hundred prisoners.
- 1952 – A De Havilland Comet makes the first jetliner flight with fare-paying passengers, from London to Johannesburg.
- 1963 – Berthold Seliger launches a rocket with three stages and a maximum flight altitude of more than 100 kilometres (62 mi) near Cuxhaven. It is the only sounding rocket developed in Germany.
- 1964 – Vietnam War: An explosion sinks the American aircraft carrier USNS Card while it is docked at Saigon. Two Viet Cong combat swimmers had placed explosives on the ship's hull. She is raised and returned to service less than seven months later.
- 1964 – First ascent of Shishapangma, the fourteenth highest mountain in the world and the lowest of the Eight-thousanders.
- 1969 – The British ocean liner Queen Elizabeth 2 departs on her maiden voyage to New York City.
- 1970 – ALM Flight 980 ditches in the Caribbean Sea near Saint Croix, killing 23.
- 1972 – In the early morning hours a fire breaks out at the Sunshine Mine located between Kellogg and Wallace, Idaho, killing 91 workers.
- 1982 – Falklands War: The British nuclear submarine HMS Conqueror sinks the Argentine cruiser ARA General Belgrano.
- 1986 – Chernobyl disaster: The City of Chernobyl is evacuated six days after the disaster.
- 1989 – Cold War: Hungary begins dismantling its border fence with Austria, which allows a number of East Germans to defect.
- 1995 – During the Croatian War of Independence, the Army of the Republic of Serb Krajina fires cluster bombs at Zagreb, killing seven and wounding over 175 civilians.
- 1998 – The European Central Bank is founded in Brussels in order to define and execute the European Union's monetary policy.
- 1999 – Panamanian general election: Mireya Moscoso becomes the first woman to be elected President of Panama.
- 2000 – President Bill Clinton announces that accurate GPS access would no longer be restricted to the United States military.
- 2004 – The Yelwa massacre concludes. It began on 4 February 2004 when armed Muslims killed 78 Christians at Yelwa, Nigeria. In response, about 630 Muslims were killed by Christians on May 2.
- 2008 – Cyclone Nargis makes landfall in Burma killing over 138,000 people and leaving millions of people homeless.
- 2008 – Chaitén Volcano begins erupting in Chile, forcing the evacuation of more than 4,500 people.
- 2011 – Osama bin Laden, the mastermind behind the September 11 attacks and the FBI's most wanted fugitive, is killed by the United States Navy SEALs in Abbottabad, Pakistan.
- 2011 – An E. coli outbreak strikes Europe, mostly in Germany, leaving more than 30 people dead and many others are taken ill.
- 2012 – A pastel version of The Scream, by Norwegian painter Edvard Munch, sells for $120 million in a New York City auction, setting a new world record for a work of art at auction.
- 2014 – Two mudslides in Badakhshan, Afghanistan, leave up to 2,500 people missing.

== Births ==
=== Pre-1600 ===
- 1360 – Yongle Emperor of China (died 1424)
- 1402 – Eleanor of Aragon, Queen of Portugal (died 1445)
- 1451 – René II, Duke of Lorraine (died 1508)
- 1458 – Eleanor of Viseu (died 1525)
- 1476 – Charles I, Duke of Münsterberg-Oels, Count of Kladsko, Governor of Bohemia and Silesia (died 1536)
- 1533 – Philip II, Duke of Brunswick-Grubenhagen (died 1596)
- 1551 – William Camden, English historian and topographer (died 1623)
- 1567 – Sebald de Weert, Dutch captain, vice-admiral of the Dutch East India Company (died 1603)
- 1579 – Tokugawa Hidetada, Japanese shōgun (died 1632)

=== 1601–1900 ===
- 1601 – Athanasius Kircher, German priest and scholar (died 1680)
- 1660 – Alessandro Scarlatti, Italian composer (died 1725)
- 1695 – Giovanni Niccolò Servandoni, Italian-French painter and architect (died 1766)
- 1702 – Friedrich Christoph Oetinger, German theologian and theosopher (died 1782)
- 1707 – Jean-Baptiste Barrière, French cellist and composer (died 1747)
- 1729 – Catherine the Great of Russia (died 1796)
- 1737 – William Petty, 2nd Earl of Shelburne, Irish-English politician, Prime Minister of Great Britain (died 1805)
- 1740 – Elias Boudinot, American lawyer and politician, 10th President of the Continental Congress (died 1821)
- 1750 – John André, English soldier and spy (died 1780)
- 1752 – Ludwig August Lebrun, German oboe player and composer (died 1790)
- 1754 – Vicente Martín y Soler, Spanish composer (died 1806)
- 1772 – Novalis, German author and poet (died 1801)
- 1773 – Henrik Steffens, Norwegian philosopher and poet (died 1845)
- 1797 – Abraham Pineo Gesner, Canadian physician and geologist (died 1864)
- 1802 – Heinrich Gustav Magnus, German chemist and physicist (died 1870)
- 1806 – Catherine Labouré, French nun and saint (died 1876)
- 1810 – Hans Christian Lumbye, Danish composer and conductor (died 1874)
- 1813 – Caroline Leigh Gascoigne, English novelist and poet (died 1883)
- 1815 – William Buell Richards, Canadian lawyer and judge, 1st Chief Justice of Canada (died 1889)
- 1822 – Jane Miller Thengberg, Scottish-Swedish governess and educator (died 1902)
- 1828 – Désiré Charnay, French archaeologist and photographer (died 1915)
- 1830 – Otto Staudinger, German entomologist and author (died 1900)
- 1844 – Elijah McCoy, Canadian-American engineer (died 1929)
- 1859 – Jerome K. Jerome, English author and playwright (died 1927)
- 1860 – John Scott Haldane, Scottish physiologist, physician, and academic (died 1936)
- 1860 – Theodor Herzl, Austro-Hungarian Zionist philosopher, journalist and author (died 1904)
- 1865 – Clyde Fitch, American playwright (died 1909)
- 1867 – Giuseppe Morello, Italian-American mobster (died 1930)
- 1872 – Ichiyō Higuchi, Japanese writer (died 1896)
- 1873 – Jurgis Baltrušaitis, Lithuanian poet, critic, and translator (died 1944)
- 1879 – James F. Byrnes, American stenographer and politician, 49th United States Secretary of State (died 1972)
- 1880 – Bill Horr, American football player, discus thrower, and coach (died 1955)
- 1881 – Harry J. Capehart, American lawyer, politician, and businessperson (died 1955)
- 1882 – Isabel González, Puerto Rican activist who helped pave the way for Puerto Ricans' American citizenship (died 1971)
- 1884 – John Boland, American politician (died 1958)
- 1885 – Hedda Hopper, American actress and gossip columnist (died 1966)
- 1886 – Gottfried Benn, German author and poet (died 1956)
- 1887 – Vernon Castle, English-American dancer (died 1918)
- 1887 – Eddie Collins, American baseball player and manager (died 1951)
- 1889 – Ki Hajar Dewantara, Indonesian philosopher, academic, and politician (died 1959)
- 1890 – E. E. Smith, American engineer and author (died 1965)
- 1892 – Manfred von Richthofen, German captain and pilot (died 1918)
- 1894 – Norma Talmadge, American actress of the silent era (died 1957)
- 1894 – Joseph Henry Woodger, English biologist, philosopher, and academic (died 1981)
- 1895 – Lorenz Hart, American playwright and lyricist (died 1943)
- 1897 – John Frederick Coots, American songwriter (died 1985)
- 1898 – Henry Hall, English bandleader, composer, and actor (died 1989)

=== 1901–present ===
- 1902 – Brian Aherne, English actor (died 1986)
- 1903 – Benjamin Spock, American pediatrician, activist, and author (died 1998)
- 1905 – Charlotte Armstrong, American author (died 1969)
- 1907 – Pinky Lee, American comedian and television host (died 1993)
- 1910 – Alexander Bonnyman Jr., American lieutenant, Medal of Honor recipient (died 1943)
- 1910 – Edmund Bacon, American urban planner, architect, educator, and author (died 2005)
- 1912 – Axel Springer, German journalist and publisher, founded Axel Springer AG (died 1985)
- 1912 – Marten Toonder, Dutch comic strip creator (died 2005)
- 1912 – Nigel Patrick, English actor and director (died 1981)
- 1915 – Doris Fisher, American singer-songwriter (died 2003)
- 1915 – Peggy Mount, English actress (died 2001)
- 1917 – Văn Tiến Dũng, Vietnamese general and politician, 6th Minister of Defence for Vietnam (died 2002)
- 1920 – Joe "Mr Piano" Henderson, Scottish pianist and composer (died 1980)
- 1921 – B. B. Lal, Indian archaeologist (died 2022)
- 1921 – Satyajit Ray, Indian director, producer, and screenwriter (died 1992)
- 1922 – Roscoe Lee Browne, American actor and director (died 2007)
- 1922 – A. M. Rosenthal, Canadian-born American journalist and author (died 2006)
- 1923 – Patrick Hillery, Irish physician and politician, 6th President of Ireland (died 2008)
- 1924 – Theodore Bikel, Austrian-American singer-songwriter, guitarist, and actor (died 2015)
- 1924 – Hugh Cortazzi, English soldier, historian, and diplomat, British Ambassador to Japan (died 2018)
- 1925 – John Neville, English-Canadian actor (died 2011)
- 1927 – Ray Barrett, Australian actor and singer (died 2009)
- 1927 – Michael Broadbent, British wine critic and writer (died 2020)
- 1929 – Édouard Balladur, Turkish-French economist and politician, 162nd Prime Minister of France (died 2026)
- 1929 – Link Wray, American singer-songwriter and guitarist (died 2005)
- 1929 – Jigme Dorji Wangchuck, Druk Gyalpo of Bhutan (died 1972)
- 1930 – Yoram Kaniuk, Israeli painter and critic (died 2013)
- 1930 – Marco Pannella, Italian journalist and politician (died 2016)
- 1931 – Phil Bruns, American actor and stuntman (died 2012)
- 1931 – Pulak Bandyopadhyay, Indian lyricist (died 1999)
- 1933 – Harry Woolf, Baron Woolf, English lawyer and judge, Lord Chief Justice of England and Wales
- 1935 – Luis Suárez Miramontes, Spanish footballer and manager (died 2023)
- 1935 – Faisal II of Iraq, the last King of Iraq (died 1958)
- 1936 – Norma Aleandro, Argentinian actress, director, and screenwriter
- 1936 – Engelbert Humperdinck, English singer and pianist
- 1937 – Lorenzo Music, American actor, producer, and screenwriter (died 2001)
- 1938 – Moshoeshoe II of Lesotho (died 1996)
- 1941 – Clay Carroll, American baseball player
- 1942 – Jacques Rogge, Belgian businessman (died 2021)
- 1943 – Mustafa Nadarević, Bosnian actor and film director (died 2020)
- 1944 – Robert G. W. Anderson, English chemist, historian, and curator
- 1945 – Judge Dread, English singer-songwriter (died 1998)
- 1945 – Bianca Jagger, Nicaraguan-American model, actress, and activist
- 1946 – Lesley Gore, American singer-songwriter (died 2015)
- 1946 – David Suchet, English actor
- 1947 – James Dyson, English businessman, founded the Dyson Company
- 1948 – Larry Gatlin, American singer-songwriter, guitarist, and actor
- 1949 – Alan Titchmarsh, English gardener and author
- 1949 – Alfons Schuhbeck, German celebrity chef, author and businessman
- 1950 – Frank Curry, Australian rugby league player and coach (died 2022)
- 1950 – Duncan Gay, Australian businessman and politician
- 1950 – Lou Gramm, American singer-songwriter
- 1951 – John Glascock, English singer and bass player (died 1979)
- 1952 – Chris Anderson, Australian rugby league player and coach
- 1952 – Christine Baranski, American actress and singer
- 1953 – Valery Gergiev, Russian conductor and director
- 1953 – Jamaal Wilkes, American basketball player
- 1954 – Elliot Goldenthal, American composer and conductor
- 1954 – Dawn Primarolo, English politician
- 1955 – Willie Miller, Scottish footballer
- 1955 – Donatella Versace, Italian fashion designer
- 1956 – Régis Labeaume, Canadian businessman and politician, 41st Mayor of Quebec City
- 1958 – Yasushi Akimoto, Japanese songwriter and producer
- 1958 – David O'Leary, English-Irish footballer and manager
- 1959 – Tony Wakeford, English singer-songwriter and guitarist
- 1960 – Stephen Daldry, English director and producer
- 1960 – Royce Simmons, Australian rugby league player and coach
- 1962 – Michael Grandage, English director and producer
- 1962 – Jimmy White, English snooker player
- 1963 – Gina Yoginda, Indonesian army general and diplomat
- 1966 – Belinda Stronach, Canadian businesswoman, philanthropist, and politician
- 1967 – Mika Brzezinski, American journalist and author
- 1967 – David Rocastle, English footballer (died 2001)
- 1968 – Jeff Agoos, American footballer
- 1968 – Ziana Zain, Malaysian singer-songwriter and actress
- 1969 – Brian Lara, Trinidadian cricketer
- 1971 – Musashimaru Kōyō, Samoan-American sumo wrestler, the 67th Yokozuna
- 1972 – Dwayne Johnson, American actor and wrestler
- 1973 – Florian Henckel von Donnersmarck, German director and screenwriter
- 1975 – David Beckham, English footballer, coach, and model
- 1975 – Joe Wilkinson, English comedian, actor and writer
- 1976 – Jeff Gutt, American singer-songwriter
- 1978 – Kumail Nanjiani, Pakistani-American actor, stand-up comedian, and screenwriter
- 1979 – Roman Lyashenko, Russian ice hockey player (died 2003)
- 1980 – Tim Borowski, German footballer
- 1980 – Ellie Kemper, American actress, comedian and writer
- 1980 – Zat Knight, English footballer
- 1980 – Troy Murphy, American basketball player
- 1980 – Brad Richards, Canadian ice hockey player
- 1981 – Robert Buckley, American actor
- 1981 – Chris Kirkland, English footballer
- 1981 – Tiago Mendes, Portuguese footballer
- 1982 – Johan Botha, South African cricketer
- 1983 – Alessandro Diamanti, Italian footballer
- 1983 – Maynor Figueroa, Honduran footballer
- 1983 – Tina Maze, Slovenian skier
- 1983 – Daniel Sordo, Spanish race car driver
- 1984 – Saulius Mikoliūnas, Lithuanian footballer
- 1984 – Thabo Sefolosha, Swiss basketball player
- 1985 – Lily Allen, English singer-songwriter and actress
- 1985 – Kyle Busch, American race car driver (died 2026)
- 1985 – Ashley Harkleroad, American tennis player
- 1985 – Sarah Hughes, American figure skater
- 1986 – Yasir Shah, Pakistani cricketer
- 1987 – Saara Aalto, Finnish singer and actress
- 1987 – Nana Kitade, Japanese singer-songwriter and actress
- 1987 – Pat McAfee, American sports analyst and football player
- 1987 – Kris Russell, Canadian ice hockey player
- 1988 – Neftalí Feliz, Dominican baseball player
- 1990 – Kay Panabaker, American actress
- 1990 – Paul George, American basketball player
- 1991 – Jeong Jinwoon, South Korean actor and singer
- 1991 – Jonathan Villar, Dominican baseball player
- 1992 – Sunmi, South Korean singer
- 1992 – María Teresa Torró Flor, Spanish tennis player
- 1993 – Owain Doull, Welsh track cyclist
- 1993 – Isyana Sarasvati, Indonesian singer
- 1993 – Huang Zitao, Chinese singer and rapper
- 1995 – Lucy Dacus, American singer-songwriter
- 1996 – Cherprang Areekul, Thai singer
- 1996 – Julian Brandt, German footballer
- 1996 – Schuyler Bailar, American swimmer
- 1997 – BamBam, Thai singer
- 2015 – Princess Charlotte of Wales, British royal, and third in line to the British throne

== Deaths ==
=== Pre-1600 ===
- 1203 BCE – Merneptah, pharaoh of Egypt
- 373 CE – Athanasius of Alexandria, Egyptian bishop and saint (born 298)
- 649 – Marutha of Tikrit, Persian theologian of the Syriac Orthodox Church (born 565)
- 821 – Liu Zong, general of the Tang dynasty
- 907 – Boris I of Bulgaria
- 1219 – Leo I, King of Armenia (born 1150)
- 1230 – William de Braose, English son of Reginald de Braose (born 1197)
- 1293 – Meir of Rothenburg, German rabbi (born c.1215)
- 1300 – Blanche of Artois (born 1248)
- 1450 – William de la Pole, 1st Duke of Suffolk, English admiral (born 1396)
- 1519 – Leonardo da Vinci, Italian painter, sculptor, and architect (born 1452)
- 1564 – Rodolfo Pio da Carpi, Italian cardinal (born 1500)

=== 1601–1900 ===
- 1627 – Lodovico Grossi da Viadana, Italian composer and educator (born 1560)
- 1667 – George Wither, English poet and author (born 1588)
- 1683 – Stjepan Gradić, Croatian philosopher and mathematician (born 1613)
- 1711 – Laurence Hyde, 1st Earl of Rochester, English politician, First Lord of the Treasury (born 1641)
- 1799 – Juan Vicente de Güemes, 2nd Count of Revillagigedo (born 1740)
- 1802 – Herman Willem Daendels, Dutch general and politician, Governor-General of the Dutch Gold Coast (born 1762)
- 1810 – Henry Jerome de Salis, English priest (born 1740)
- 1819 – Mary Moser, English painter and academic (born 1744)
- 1832 – Zina Hitchcock, New York politician (born 1755)
- 1856 – James Gates Percival, American poet, surgeon and geologist (born 1795)
- 1857 – Alfred de Musset, French dramatist, poet, and novelist (born 1810)
- 1864 – Giacomo Meyerbeer, German composer and educator (born 1791)
- 1866 – José Gálvez Egúsquiza, Peruvian politician (born 1819)
- 1880 – Eberhard Anheuser, German-American businessman, co-founded Anheuser-Busch (born 1805)
- 1880 – Tom Wills, Australian cricketer, co-created Australian rules football (born 1835)
- 1885 – Terézia Zakoucs, Hungarian-Slovene author (born 1817)
- 1900 – Lars Oftedal, Norwegian priest, social reformer, politician, and newspaper editor (born 1838)

=== 1901–present ===
- 1912 – Homer Davenport, American political cartoonist (born 1867)
- 1915 – Clara Immerwahr, German chemist (born 1870)
- 1918 – Jüri Vilms, Estonian lawyer and politician (born 1889)
- 1925 – Antun Branko Šimić, Croatian and Bosnian-Herzegovinian poet (born 1898)
- 1925 – Johann Palisa, Austrian astronomer (born 1848)
- 1927 – Ernest Starling, English physiologist and academic (born 1866)
- 1929 – Charalambos Tseroulis, Greek general and politician, Greek Minister for Military Affairs (born 1879)
- 1940 – Ernest Joyce, English explorer (born 1875)
- 1941 – Penelope Delta, Greek author (born 1874)
- 1945 – Martin Bormann, German politician (born 1900)
- 1945 – Joe Corbett, American baseball player and journalist (born 1875)
- 1946 – Bill Denny, Australian journalist, lawyer, politician, and decorated soldier (born 1872)
- 1947 – Dorothea Binz, German SS officer (born 1920)
- 1953 – Wallace Bryant, American archer (born 1863)
- 1957 – Joseph McCarthy, American captain, lawyer, judge, and politician (born 1908)
- 1963 – Ronald Barnes, 3rd Baron Gorell, English cricketer, peer, politician, poet, author and newspaper editor (born 1884)
- 1964 – Nancy Astor, Viscountess Astor, American-English politician (born 1879)
- 1969 – Franz von Papen, German general and politician, Chancellor of Germany (born 1879)
- 1972 – J. Edgar Hoover, American 1st director of the Federal Bureau of Investigation (born 1895)
- 1974 – James O. Richardson, American admiral (born 1878)
- 1977 – Nicholas Magallanes, American principal dancer and charter member of the New York City Ballet (born 1922)
- 1979 – Giulio Natta, Italian chemist and engineer, Nobel Prize laureate (born 1903)
- 1980 – Clarrie Grimmett, New Zealand-Australian cricketer (born 1891)
- 1980 – George Pal, Hungarian-American animator and producer (born 1908)
- 1983 – Norm Van Brocklin, American football player and coach (born 1926)
- 1984 – Jack Barry, American game show host and producer, co-founded Barry & Enright Productions (born 1918)
- 1984 – Bob Clampett, American animator, director, and producer (born 1913)
- 1985 – Attilio Bettega, Italian race car driver (born 1951)
- 1985 – Larry Clinton, American trumpet player and bandleader (born 1909)
- 1986 – Sergio Cresto, American race car driver (born 1956)
- 1986 – Henri Toivonen, Finnish race car driver (born 1956)
- 1989 – Veniamin Kaverin, Russian author (born 1902)
- 1989 – Giuseppe Siri, Italian cardinal (born 1906)
- 1990 – David Rappaport, English-American actor (born 1951)
- 1991 – Gauri Shankar Rai, Indian Politician (born 1924)
- 1991 – Ronald McKie, Australian journalist and author (born 1909)
- 1992 – Wilbur Mills, American lawyer and politician (born 1909)
- 1993 – André Moynet, French race car driver, pilot, and politician (born 1921)
- 1994 – Dorothy Marie Donnelly, American poet and author (born 1903)
- 1995 – John Bunting, Australian public servant and diplomat, (born 1918)
- 1995 – Michael Hordern, English actor (born 1911)
- 1997 – John Eccles, Australian neurophysiologist and academic, Nobel Prize laureate (born 1903)
- 1997 – Paulo Freire, Brazilian philosopher and academic (born 1921)
- 1998 – hide, Japanese singer-songwriter, guitarist, and producer (born 1964)
- 1998 – Justin Fashanu, English footballer (born 1961)
- 1999 – Douglas Harkness, Canadian politician (born 1903)
- 1999 – Oliver Reed, English actor (born 1938)
- 2000 – Sundar Popo, Indo-Trinidadian musician (born 1943)
- 2002 – W. T. Tutte, English-Canadian mathematician and academic (born 1917)
- 2005 – Wee Kim Wee, Singaporean journalist and politician, 4th President of Singapore (born 1915)
- 2006 – Louis Rukeyser, American journalist and author (born 1933)
- 2007 – Brad McGann, New Zealand director and screenwriter (born 1964)
- 2008 – Beverlee McKinsey, American actress (born 1940)
- 2008 – Izold Pustõlnik, Ukrainian-Estonian astronomer and academic (born 1938)
- 2009 – Marilyn French, American author and academic (born 1929)
- 2009 – Kiyoshiro Imawano, Japanese singer-songwriter, producer, and actor (born 1951)
- 2009 – Jack Kemp, American football player and politician, 9th United States Secretary of Housing and Urban Development (born 1935)
- 2010 – Lynn Redgrave, English-American actress and singer (born 1943)
- 2011 – Osama bin Laden, Saudi Arabian terrorist, founder of Al-Qaeda (born 1957)
- 2012 – Fernando Lopes, Portuguese director and screenwriter (born 1935)
- 2012 – Zenaida Manfugás, Cuban-born American-naturalized pianist (born 1932)
- 2012 – Tufan Miñnullin, Russian playwright and politician (born 1936)
- 2012 – Endang Rahayu Sedyaningsih, Indonesian physician and politician, Indonesian Minister of Health (born 1955)
- 2012 – Akira Tonomura, Japanese physicist, author, and academic (born 1942)
- 2012 – Lourdes Valera, Venezuelan actress (born 1963)
- 2013 – Ernie Field, English boxer (born 1943)
- 2013 – Jeff Hanneman, American guitarist and songwriter (born 1964)
- 2013 – Joseph P. McFadden, American bishop (born 1947)
- 2013 – Dvora Omer, Israeli author and educator (born 1932)
- 2013 – Ivan Turina, Croatian footballer (born 1980)
- 2013 – Charles Banks Wilson, American painter and illustrator (born 1918)
- 2014 – Tomás Balduino, Brazilian bishop (born 1922)
- 2014 – Žarko Petan, Slovenian director, playwright, and screenwriter (born 1929)
- 2014 – Efrem Zimbalist Jr., American actor (born 1918)
- 2015 – Stuart Archer, English colonel and architect (born 1915)
- 2015 – Michael Blake, American author and screenwriter (born 1945)
- 2015 – Guy Carawan, American singer and musicologist (born 1927)
- 2015 – Maya Plisetskaya, Russian-Lithuanian ballerina, choreographer, actress, and director (born 1925)
- 2015 – Ruth Rendell, English author (born 1930)
- 2016 – Afeni Shakur, American music businesswoman, activist, and Black Panther (born 1947)
- 2020 – Arif Wazir, Pakistani politician, leader of the Pashtun Tahafuz Movement (born 1982)
- 2021 – Marcel Stellman, Belgian record producer and lyricist (born 1925)
- 2024 – Sjoukje Dijkstra, Dutch figure skater (born 1942)
- 2024 – Darius Morris, American basketball player (born 1991)
- 2024 – Peter Oosterhuis, English golfer and broadcaster (born 1948)
- 2025 – Ricky Davao, Filipino actor and director (born 1961)
- 2025 – George Ryan, American politician, 39th Governor of Illinois (born 1934)

== Holidays and observances ==
- Christian feast day:
  - Ahudemmeh (Syriac Orthodox Church).
  - Athanasius of Alexandria (Western Christianity)
  - Bolesław Strzelecki (Catholic Church)
  - Boris I of Bulgaria (Bulgarian Orthodox Church)
  - Germanus of Normandy
  - Joseph Luu Van Nguyen (Catholic Church)
  - Wiborada (Catholic Church)
  - William Tirry (Catholic Church)
  - May 2 (Eastern Orthodox liturgics)
- The last day of the Festival of Ridván (Baháʼí Faith) (this date is non-Gregorian and may change according to the March equinox, see List of observances set by the Baháʼí calendar)
- Anniversary of the Dos de Mayo Uprising (Community of Madrid, Spain)
- Birth Anniversary of Third Druk Gyalpo (Bhutan)
- Flag Day (Poland)
- Indonesia National Education Day
- Teachers' Day (Iran) (this date is non-Gregorian and may change according to the March Equinox, see List of observances set by the Solar Hijri calendar)
- World Tuna Day
