= Begaye =

Begaye is a surname, derived from the Navajo word biyeʼ [pìjèʔ] meaning "his/her son". Notable people with the surname include:

- Enei Begaye, American activist
- Fleming Begaye Sr. (1921–2019), Navajo code talker
- Kelsey Begaye (1951–2021), American politician
- Nathan Begaye (1969–2010), Native American ceramics artist
- Ray Begaye (born 1954), American politician
- Russell Begaye, American politician

== See also ==
- Begay
