= Saint Zoe =

Saint Zoe may refer to:

- Zoe of Rome (d. ca. 286), noblewoman, wife of Nicostratus, a high Roman court official. Later saint
- Zoe (died 127 AD), wife of Exuperius, 2nd century Christian martyr alongside Exuperius (see Exuperius and Zoe)
