= Aken =

Aken may refer to:

- Aken (god), in Ancient Egyptian religion
- Aken (Elbe), a town in Saxony-Anhalt, Germany
- Aachen, a city in Germany
- Aken (novel), a 1996 novel by Madis Kõiv
- Josephine Apieu Jenaro Aken (1955–2008), South Sudanese civil servant and politician
