= May 2 (Eastern Orthodox liturgics) =

Day in the Eastern Orthodox liturgical calendar

Eastern Orthodox liturgical calendar
May 1	May 2	May 3
May 2 O.S. ≍ May 15 N.S. May 2 N.S ≍ April 19 O.S.

An Eastern Orthodox cross

May 2 in Eastern Orthodox liturgical calendars is a feast day and a day of commemoration of saints and martyrs. Although some Orthodox churches use the Revised Julian Calendar and others use the traditional Julian calendar, the fixed commemorations for their respective May 2 are broadly the same, no matter which calendar is used. (Note: Despite the dates being the same, the days to which they refer typically differ by 13 days. The notation Old Style or O.S. is sometimes used to indicate a date in the traditional Julian Calendar (the "Old Calendar"). The notation New Style or N.S. indicates a date in the Revised Julian calendar (the "New Calendar").)

== Saints ==
- Martyrs Hesperos (Exuperius) and Zoe, and their sons Cyriacos and Theodoulos, at Attalia (c. 124) (Note: "Also the holy martyrs Exuperius and Zoe, his wife, with their sons, Cyriacus and Theodulus, who suffered under the emperor Adrian.")
- Saint Jordan the Wonderworker
- Saint Sabbas, Bishop of Dafnousia
- Saint Boris-Michael, Prince and baptizer of Bulgaria, Equal-to-the-Apostles (907)

== Pre-Schism Western saints ==
- Saint Valentine, Bishop of Genoa in Italy c. 295-307, (c. 307)
- Saint Germanus of Normandy, converted by St Germanus of Auxerre, martyred in France (c. 460)
- Hieromartyrs Vindemialis, Eugene and Longinus, Bishops in North Africa martyred by the Arian Vandal King Hunneric (c. 485) (Note: "The same day, St. Vindemial, bishop and martyr, who with the holy bishops Eugenius and Longinus, combated the Arians by his teaching and miracles, and was decapitated by order of king Hunneric.")
- Saint Neachtain, a relative of St Patrick of Ireland at whose repose he was present (5th century)
- Saint Ultan, Irish monk, brother of Saints Fursey and Foillan (657) (Note: "ST. ULTAN was one of the brothers of St. Fursey and followed him from Ireland, and lived with him for some time in his Monastery of Burghcastle, in Suffolk. Afterwards, feeling himself called to a life of solitude, he retired to a hermitage in the same kingdom of East Anglia, whither he was followed somewhat later by St. Fursey himself. These holy brothers lived together in great austerity, continual prayer, and the labour of their hands, until their tranquillity was disturbed by the outbreak of fresh wars. St. Fursey then retired to France, but St. Ultan appears to have remained in England until after the death of his brother, when he, with his other brother, St. Foilan, went abroad and was received by St. Gertrude of Nievelles, who gave him land to build the Abbey of Fosse, in the diocese of Liege. After the martyrdom of his brother St. Foilan, he passed to Peronne, where the relics of St. Fursey were preserved. He was there chosen Abbot, and continued to govern the two houses of Fosse and Peronne until the time of his death. He was buried at Fosse, and greatly venerated as a Saint, especially in these two monasteries.")
- Saint Waldebert (Walbert, Gaubert), abbot of Luxeuil in France (c. 668)
- Saint Bertinus the Younger, Benedictine monk at Sithin, in France (699)
- Saint Felix of Seville, deacon and martyr in Seville, Spain, under the Muslims.
- Martyr Wiborada, anchoress of St. Gallen Abbey in Germany (926)

== Post-Schism Orthodox saints ==
- Saint Athanasius of Syandem and Valaam (c. 1550) (Note: Also commemorated on January 18.)
- Saint Serapion (Sysoev), Metropolitan of Krutitsa (1653) (Note: See: (in Russian) Серапион (Сысоев). Википедии. (Russian Wikipedia).)
- Saint Athanasius III Patelaros, Patriarch of Constantinople and Wonderworker of Lubensk (Lubny), (1654) (Note: Also known as "Afanassiy Lubensky - Sidyachey," he was the chief patron of Poltava. He died in Ukraine on his way to Constantinople and was buried in the sitting position, enthroned, thus "Athanasius the Sitting." He was glorified by the Metropolitan of Kyiv as a Wonderworker.)
- Saint Jacob (Putneanul), Metropolitan of Moldova (1778)
- Blessed Basil of Kadom, fool-for-Christ (1848)
- Saint Matrona the Blind, the Righteous Wonderworker of Moscow (1952) (Note: On February 15, 2018, the Holy Synod of the Romanian Patriarchate also resolved that the Blessed Matrona of Moscow also be included in the Calendar of the Romanian Orthodox Church for veneration.) (see also: February 23 - Finding of relics)

== Other commemorations ==
- Translation of the relics of Patriarch Athanasius of Alexandria (Athanasios the Great) (373) (Note: "AT Alexandria, the birthday of St. Athanasius, bishop of that city and Doctor of the Church, most celebrated for sanctity and learning. Although almost all the world had formed a conspiracy to persecute him, he courageously defended the Catholic faith, from the reign of Constantine to that of Valens, against emperors, governors, and a multitude of Arian bishops, whose perfidious attacks forced him to wander as an exile over the whole earth without finding a place of security. At length, however, he was restored to his church, and after fighting many combats, and winning many crowns by his patience, he departed for heaven in the forty-sixth year of his priesthood, in the time of the emperors Valentinian and Valens.")
- Translation of the relics (1072 and 1115) of the holy passion-bearers Boris and Gleb (in holy baptism Romanus and David) (1015)
- Icon of the Theotokos of Putivilsk (1238, 1635)
- Repose of Eldress Theodosia (Kosorotikhina) of Skopin, Ryazan (2014)

== Icon gallery ==
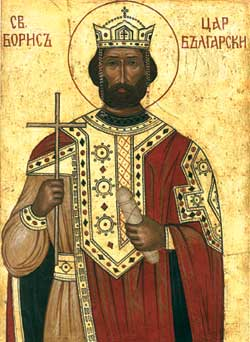
St. Boris-Michael, Prince and baptizer of Bulgaria.

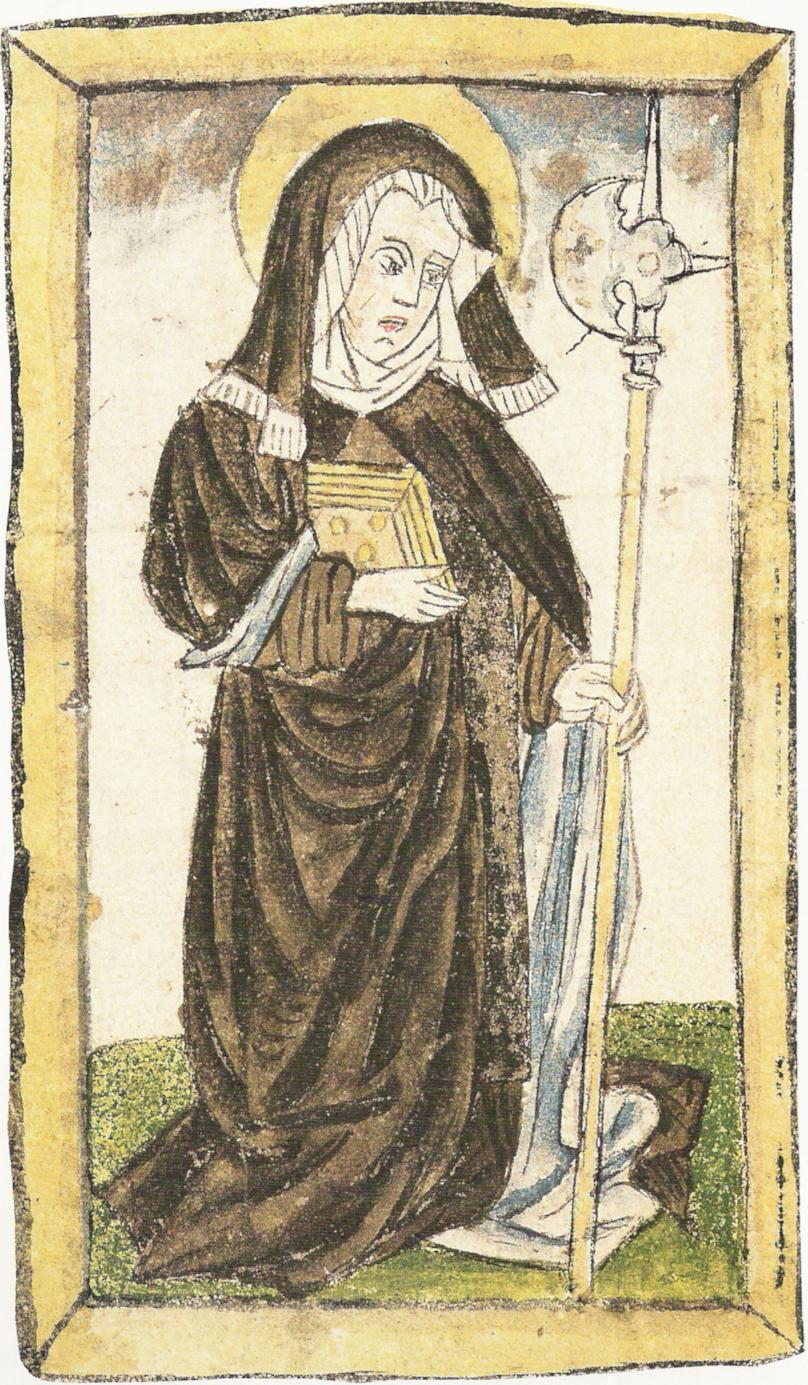
St. Wiborada. (Cathedral library of St. Gallen, Codex 586, S. 230. c. 1430-1436).

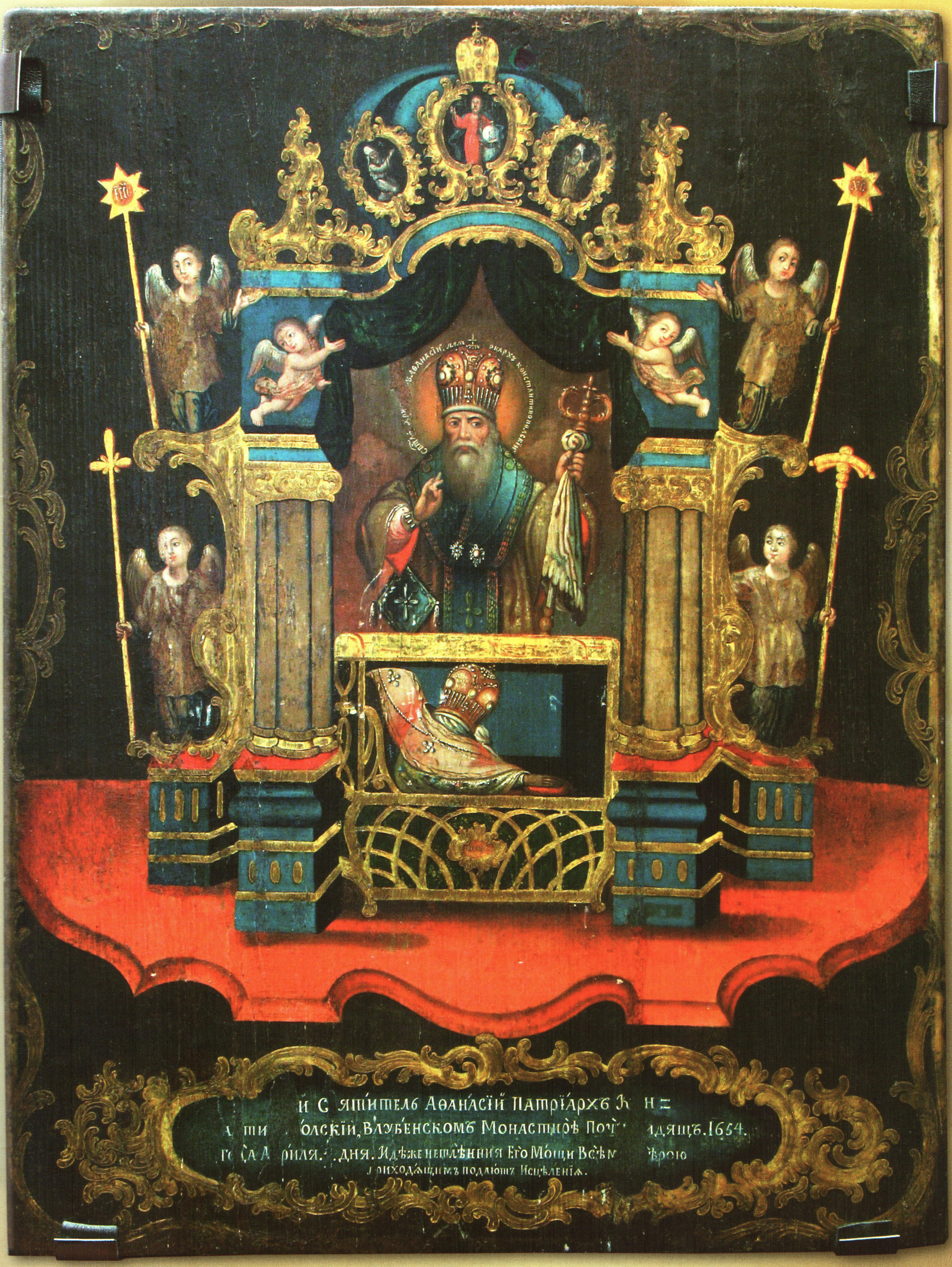
St. Athanasius III Patelaros, Ecumenical Patriarch of Constantinople.

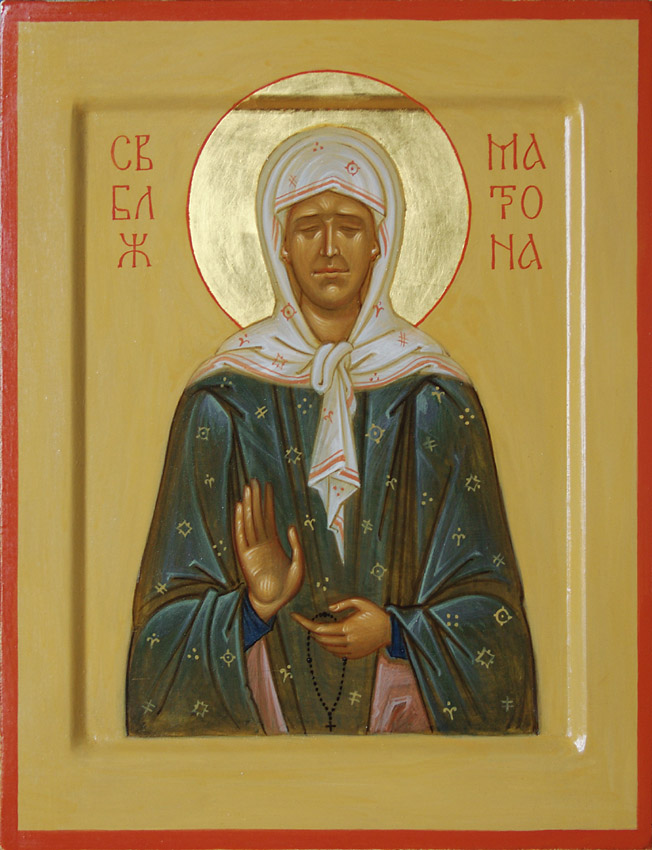
St. Matrona the Blind, the Righteous Wonderworker of Moscow.

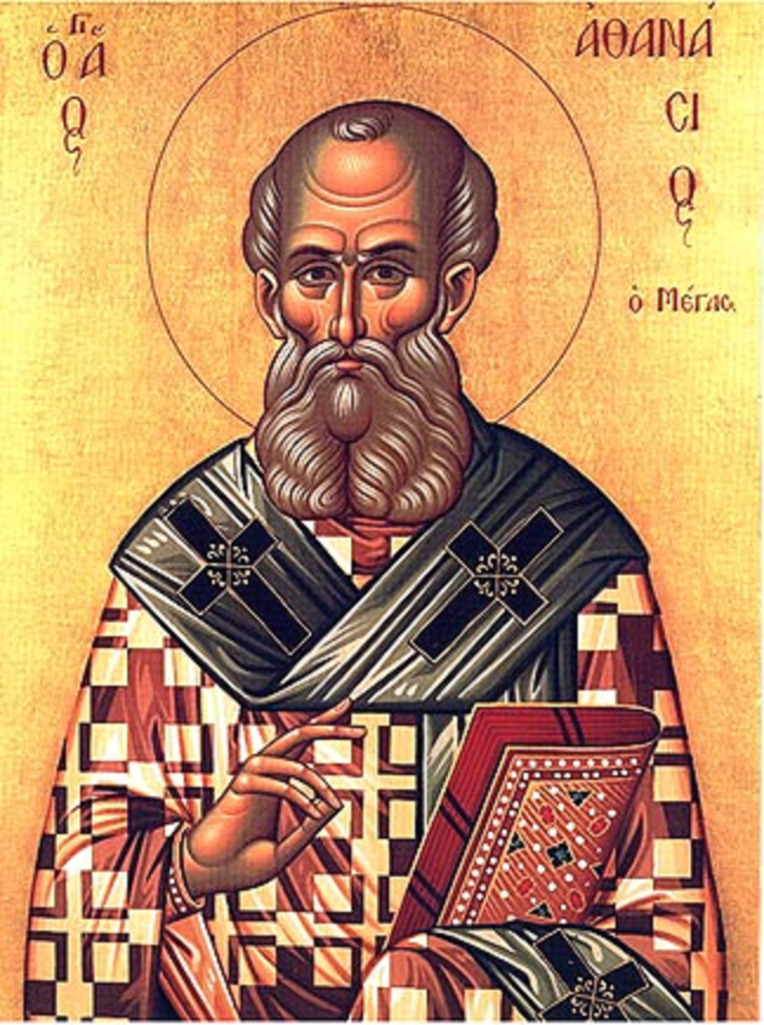
Saint Athanasius the Great.

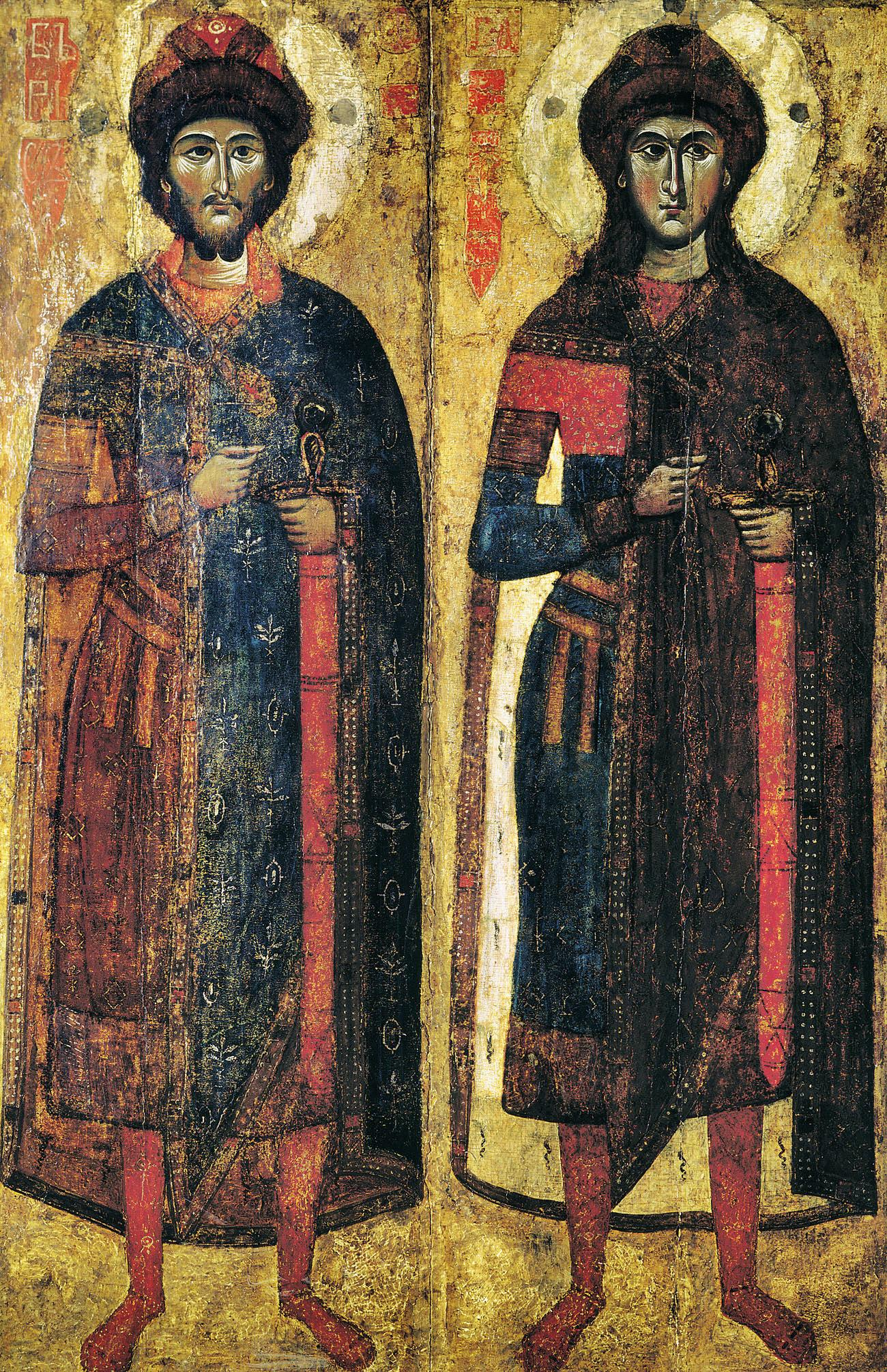
Holy passion-bearers Boris and Gleb (in holy baptism Romanus and David).

== Sources ==
- May 2/15, Orthodox Calendar (PRAVOSLAVIE.RU)
- May 15, 2011 / May 2, HOLY TRINITY RUSSIAN ORTHODOX CHURCH (A parish of the Patriarchate of Moscow)
- May 2. Latin Saints of the Orthodox Patriarchate of Rome.
- The Roman Martyrology. Transl. by the Archbishop of Baltimore. Last Edition, According to the Copy Printed at Rome in 1914. Revised Edition, with the Imprimatur of His Eminence Cardinal Gibbons. Baltimore: John Murphy Company, 1916. pp. 124–125.
- Rev. Richard Stanton. A Menology of England and Wales, or, Brief Memorials of the Ancient British and English Saints Arranged According to the Calendar, Together with the Martyrs of the 16th and 17th Centuries. London: Burns & Oates, 1892. pp. 192–193.

Greek Sources

- Great Synaxaristes: (in Greek) 2 ΜΑΪΟΥ, ΜΕΓΑΣ ΣΥΝΑΞΑΡΙΣΤΗΣ.
- (in Greek) Συναξαριστής. 2 Μαΐου. ECCLESIA.GR. (H ΕΚΚΛΗΣΙΑ ΤΗΣ ΕΛΛΑΔΟΣ).

Russian Sources

- (in Russian) 15 мая (2 мая). Православная Энциклопедия под редакцией Патриарха Московского и всея Руси Кирилла (электронная версия). (Orthodox Encyclopedia - Pravenc.ru).
- (in Russian) 2 мая (ст.ст.) 15 мая 2013 (нов. ст.). Русская Православная Церковь Отдел внешних церковных связей. (DECR).
