= Dominic Dim Deng =

South Sudanese politician and general (1950–2008)

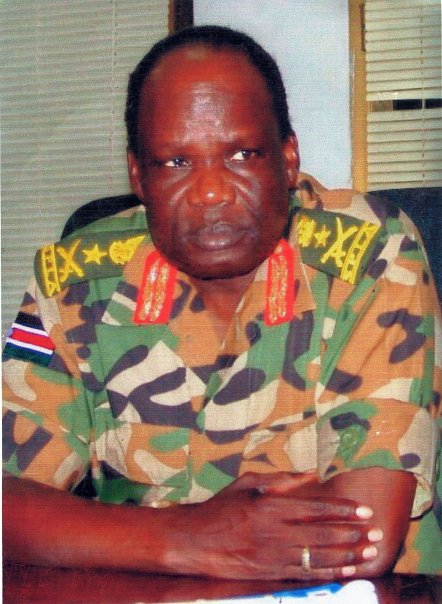

1st Minister of Defence
- In office 2007 – 2 May 2008
- Preceded by: New position
- Succeeded by: Nhial Deng Nhial

Personal details
- Born: March 1, 1950 Bahr al-Ghazal, Anglo-Egyptian Sudan (now South Sudan)
- Died: May 2, 2008 (aged 58)
- Party: Sudan People's Liberation Movement
- Spouse: Madam Josephine Apieu Jenaro Aken
- Children: 6

Lt Gen Dominic Dim Deng (1 March 1950 – 2 May 2008) was a senior member of the Sudan People's Liberation Army, a distinguished military veteran general and the first defence minister in the Government of Southern Sudan who lost his life alongside his wife Madam Josephine Apieu Jenaro Aken, senior politician Dr. Justin Yac Arop and 18 other Sudan People's Liberation Army and Government of Southern Sudan officials on a leased CEM Air Beechcraft 1900 that crashed 375 km west of Juba, Sudan on May 2, 2008.

== Life and career ==
Flag of Sudan People's Liberation Army

Dominic Dim, a member of the Dinka group from the Bahr el Ghazal region was born in a remote village called Adol in Twic County, Warrap State, Southern Sudan. He began his education at Nyarkach Elementary School in 1960, and continued onto Kuajok Intermediate School in 1964. Dominic Dim Deng's education was interrupted when at the age of 16 joined the Anya Nya movement in 1966. He was trained and commissioned as a staff sergeant, and was deployed in Bhar el Ghazel. He distinguished himself as a young courageous fighter specializing in setting mines. He progressed through the ranks, and in 1967 he was selected to attend the Angundri Convention.

He resumed his education in Congo for two and half years but was recalled to the front in 1969. He attended officers' training and was promoted to first lieutenant. Dominic Dim Deng was among the Anya Nya officers of the NPG who accepted joining Gen Joseph Lagu's SSLM in 1970. He was dispatched to Bhar el Ghazal to train Anya Nya recruits in January 1971. He was deployed as commander of Tonj, with Lt Salva Mathok as his deputy. Unaware of the cease-fire that preceded the Addis Ababa Agreement, Lt Dominic Dim Deng a committed guerilla fighter was found by Anya Nya units as he was setting demolitions.

When Addis Ababa Agreement was concluded, he was confirmed in the Sudan Armed Forces (SAF) with a rank of first lieutenant. He continued to train Anya Nya forces until May 1972, and he was transferred as company commander to Aweil in 1975. Lt Dominic Dim Deng underwent the platoon commander course in Jebiet in 1976, was promoted to captain, and returned to Aweil. He was subsequently transferred to Maridi, western Equatoria in 1976. He successfully completed his commander course in 1976 and was promoted to major in 1982. Completing another course (PSC) at staff college and was recalled to Juba in May 1983. By this time Dominic Dim Deng was secretly and actively involved in an underground movement of nationalist military officers who opposed the integration and transfer of former Anya Nya forces to the North. He was transferred to the SAF GHQ in Khartoum in 1984 as a colonel and was responsible for logistics. He attended a brigade course in Kareri. By this time he was actively involved with Gordon Mourtat Mathi in the recruitment of officers and NCO's to defect to the SPLA.

Dominic Dim Deng eventually left the SAF with a rank of colonel, and he joined the SPLM/A in 1987. He was immediately appointed A/Cdr and assigned as deputy commander for Northern Zone in Bhar el Ghazal. He was the commander of the William Deng Taskforce in Tonj in 1989. Two years later he was promoted to full commander and was recalled to Bonga, assigned to Central Zone, Jonglei, Bor. He led the SPLA forces that defeated SAF's Saif el Ubour and commanded the Intifada Battalion, which fought around Rumbek. Dominic Dim Deng was appointed deputy chief of staff to Cdr William Nyuon and took part in the Western Equatoria campaign. He was wounded fighting between Kobri 40 and Juba in 1991. He received basic treatment in Torit and resumed operations in Maridi, Mundri, and Rokon, but he had to travel to London for advanced medical treatment in 1991.

Dominic Dim Deng returned from the U.K in 1992, he was posted in Torit, the SPLA forces under his command repulsed the enemy in eastern Equatoria. He was part of delegation led by the chairman to the United States in 1992. He was elected as a delegate to the First SPLM National Convention in Chukudum from 2 to 13 April 1994. In the U.K, Dominic Dim Deng played a central role in solidifying support for the movement in Diaspora and British government. He also obtained a BA Honorary degree in 1998. Upon his return to the movement, Dominic Dim joined the National Liberation Council in 2004 and became a close confidant of Cdr Salva Kiir, the deputy chairman of the movement. He was assigned to command SPLA's special reserve forces in Yei. He was appointed as lieutenant general in 2005 after the CPA. In the same year, he was also appointed as a member of parliament in Southern Sudan Legislative Assembly, a position he served until his death.

In 2006 Lt. Gen. Dim was sent to South Africa for military leadership course, part of a programme initiated by the South African Government, for SPLM/A senior staff. He had been elected chairperson of SPLM in his home state. Dominic Dim was promoted to full general, one of only four SPLA officers, including President Salva Kiir. In 2007 he became the first political officer of the Sudan People's Liberation Army when he was appointed as the first Minister for SPLA Affairs in the Government of Southern Sudan. He was also locally elected as the Chairperson of Warrap State Communities.

General Dominic Dim Deng's first task was to lay the ground work for transforming the SPLA from a guerrilla movement into a professional army. However, before he could complete this task, he was killed in a plane crash.

== Cause of his death ==
General Dominic Dim Deng was killed in a plane crash near Rumbek with all other passengers, including his wife Josephine Apieu Jenaro Aken and Dr. Justin Yac Arop. The passengers were returning from Warrap after attending an SPLM state function in Kuajok, Warrap. As the first minister of SPLA affairs, he was duly honoured. General Dominic Dim Deng was buried alongside his wife in Bilpam, the Sudan People's Liberation Army Headquarters in Juba on 2 May 2008.

== Personal life ==
Dim was married to Josephine Apieu Jenaro Aken whom he met at Pannyok School where her father Jenario Aken was a teacher. They were married in 1973.
