= Matrona Nikonova =

Canonized saint of the Russian Orthodox Church

Saint Matrona of Moscow
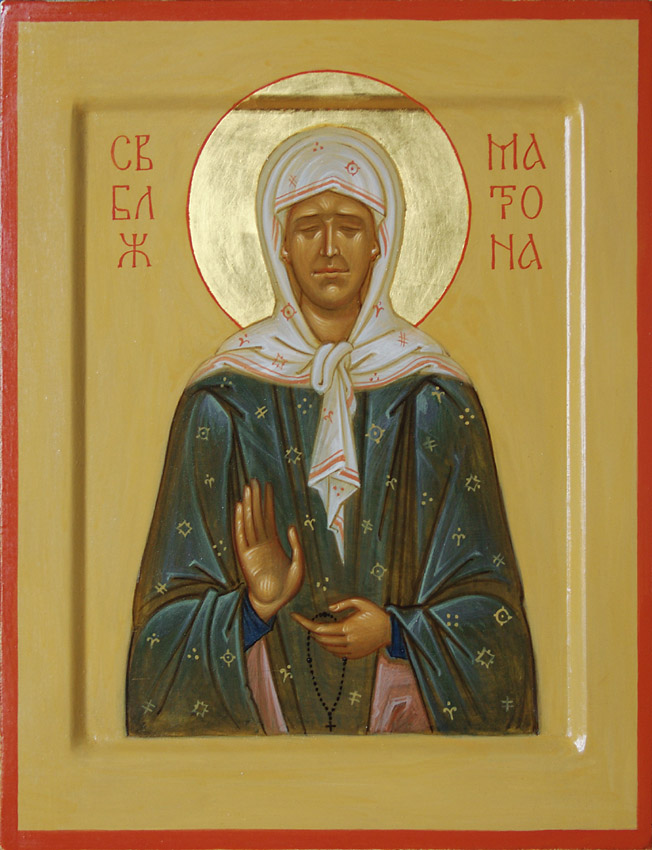
- Russian icon of Saint Matrona of Moscow

Blessed Elder of Moscow
- Born: 1881 – 1885 (the exact date of birth is approximate and remains unknown) village Sebino, Tula Governorate, Russian Empire
- Died: 2 May 1952 (aged 70); Khimki, Moscow Oblast, Soviet Union
- Venerated in: Eastern Orthodox Church
- Canonized: 1999 by Russian Orthodox Church
- Major shrine: Intercession Convent, Taganka District, Moscow, Russia
- Feast: May 2

Matrona Dimitrievna Nikonova (Russian: Блаженная Матро́на Дими́триевна Ни́конова (Московская), romanized: Blazhennaya Matrona Dimitrievna Nikonova (Moskovskaya); 1881/1885 – 2 May 1952) is a canonized saint of the Russian Orthodox Church who is said to have had the gifts of prophecy, spiritual vision, and healing from early childhood.

== Early life ==
Matrona was born to Dimitry Ioannovich and Natalia Nikitichna Nikonov in the village of Sebino in Tula Province. She was the fourth child in the family. Her struggling parents planned to place her in an orphanage after her birth but her mother changed her mind after she had a dream, in which she saw that a white bird of divine beauty, with empty eye sockets, landed on her breast. When Matrona was born, she was blind, with eyelids closed over empty eye sockets. On her chest was a cross-shaped raised birthmark. Her mother took this as a heavenly sign. According to legend, by the time she was eight, she had revealed prophetic and healing powers.

Forty days after her birth, Matrona was taken to her local church to be baptized. Upon her baptism, a pillar of fragrant thin smoke appeared above her. All present witnessed this miracle. She slept all day long on Wednesdays and Fridays to fast from drinking milk as a baby. She would also crawl to the icon corner, grab images of the saints, and began to talk to them.

== Revolution ==
Following the Russian Revolution of 1917, she and her friend Lydia Yankova became homeless peasants who left their villages to find work and food in larger cities. By 1925, Matrona moved to Moscow, possibly following her two brothers, and took to a life of wandering, finding shelter with friends and relatives in houses, apartments, and basements. She could not stay with her two brothers, both Communists, because Matrona preached the Orthodox faith.

== Later life ==
At a time when other religious people were sent to the Gulag or sent into exile for their beliefs, no one ever betrayed Matrona's location. People continued to come to Matrona for advice and for help with their troubles.

A story, related by her biographer, Zinaida Zhdanova, tells how Matrona told Zinaida's mother, Evdokia, described as a plain 28-year-old, that she would marry a handsome nobleman. Evdokia moved to Moscow and became a cook at the house of a rich nobleman whose son, Vladimir, was betrothed to one Shukhova. Shortly thereafter, Vladimir is said to have had a dream in which a voice told him to marry a woman named Evdokia. The next morning he asked if there was such a woman in the household, met her, and nearly fainted. Later, he was sent for training to Perm with Evdokia, and Zinaida was born shortly thereafter.

In another of her reported miracles, she helped a college architecture student to revise a paper required for graduation by describing in detail some of the great architectural achievements in Florence and Rome, including the Palazzo Pitti.

She is said to have predicted her own death three days in advance, accepting all visitors during those final days. Following her death in 1952, her gravesite became a pilgrimage site. She was recently canonized by the Russian Orthodox Church. Her remains are now in the Church of the Protecting Veil of Our Lady at Intercession Convent in Moscow. The lines of people waiting to visit her gravesite are reported as regularly being quite long (often needing three or four hours to make a short visit to the gravesite) and well-behaved.

== Veneration ==
Her day is commemorated by the Orthodox Church on May 2.

On February 15, 2018, the Holy Synod of the Romanian Patriarchate resolved that the Blessed Matrona of Moscow also be included in the Calendar of the Romanian Orthodox Church for veneration.

A monastery in honor of St. Matrona of Moscow is being built in Republika Srpska with the blessing of the Serbian Orthodox Church.

== Notes ==
1. In Russian: Святая Матрона Московская.
2. 1885 according to some sources.

== Sources ==
- The Moscow Miracle Worker, by Polina Volidina, Aeroflot #6, 2006, retrieved February 26, 2007.
