= Intercession Monastery (Moscow) =

Russian Orthodox convent

Pokrovsky Monastery
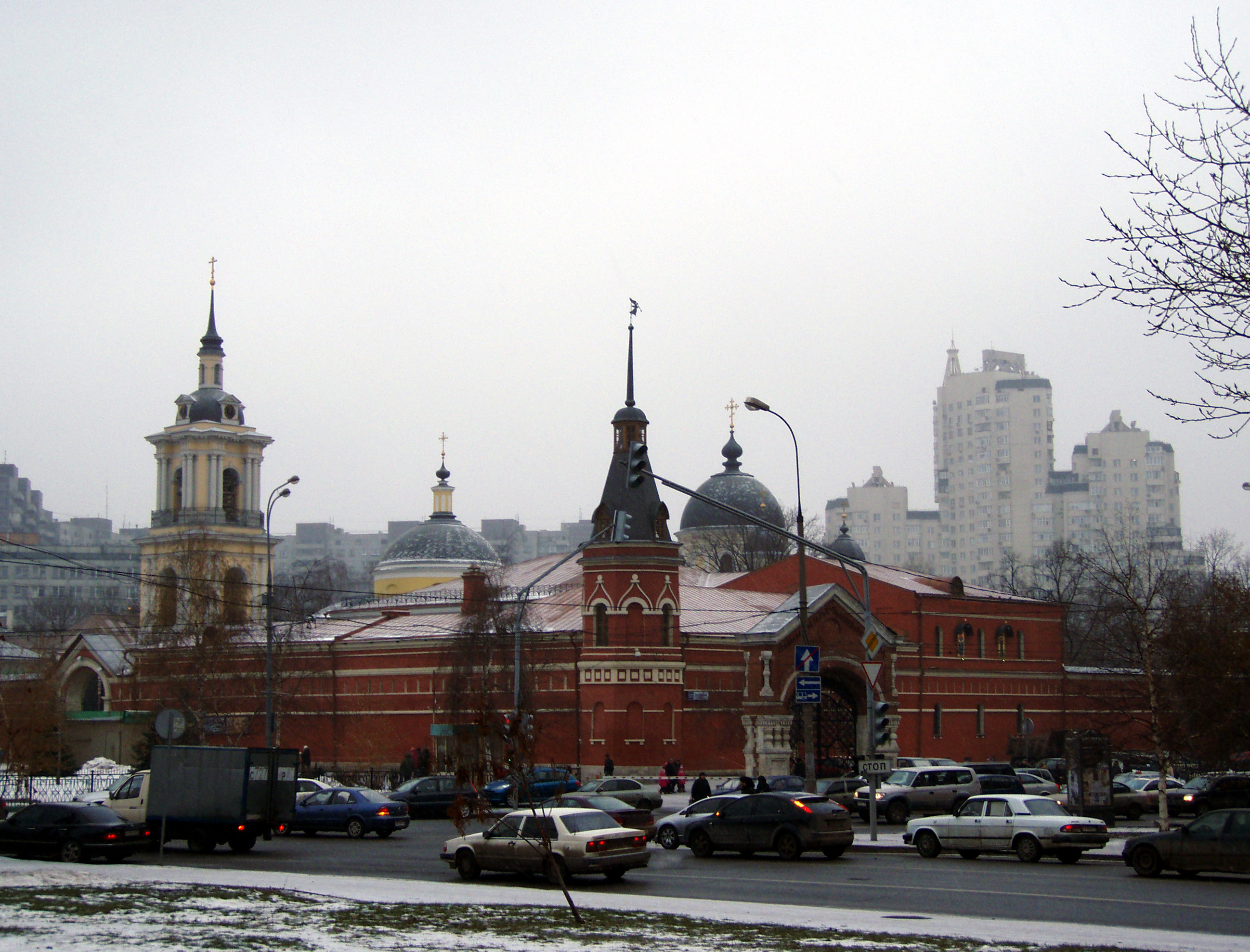
- Pokrovsky Convent in 2007
- Interactive map of Pokrovsky Monastery

Monastery information
- Order: Orthodox
- Established: 1635
- Diocese: Moscow

People
- Founder: Michael of Russia

Site
- Location: Moscow, Russia
- Coordinates: 55.738333°N 37.670833°E

Intercession (Pokrovsky) Monastery (Покровский монастырь) is a Russian Orthodox convent situated in Moscow, in the neighbourhood of Taganka. It was named after the Intercession of the Theotokos.

The monastery has been known since 1635 and long remained a poor monastic abode outside the city proper, neighbouring a large cemetery for commoners. It was a filial monastery of the Zaikonospassky Monastery between 1680 and 1731.

Much of the monastery is Neoclassical in design and dates from the early 19th century. The five-domed katholikon was erected in the mid-1850s to Mikhail Bykovsky's Byzantine Revival designs. It is dedicated to the Renewal of the Temple of the Resurrection in Jerusalem.

The Soviets disbanded the brethren and had some of the walls torn down. The monastery was revived in 1994 as a stauropegic nunnery. It derives much of its popularity and income from the relics of St. Matrona of Moscow, a very popular saint.
