= Kelsey Begaye =

President of the Navajo Nation from 1999 to 2003

- Begaye in 2021

5th President of the Navajo Nation
- In office January 12, 1999 – January 14, 2003
- Vice President: Taylor McKenzie
- Preceded by: Milton Bluehouse Sr.
- Succeeded by: Joe Shirley Jr.

2nd Speaker of the Navajo Nation Council
- In office 1997–1999
- Preceded by: Nelson Gorman
- Succeeded by: Edward T. Begay

Personal details
- Born: January 7, 1951 Kaibito, Arizona, U.S.
- Died: August 13, 2021 (aged 70) Flagstaff, Arizona, U.S.
- Party: Democratic
- Spouse: Marie Begaye
- Education: College of Ganado

Kelsey A. Begaye (January 7, 1951 – August 13, 2021) was elected the fifth president of the Navajo Nation in November 1998, defeating fellow Democrat Joe Shirley, Jr. in the general election. In 2002, he lost to Shirley in his bid for reelection.

Political offices
Preceded by Milton Bluehouse Sr.	President of the Navajo Nation; 1999–2003	Succeeded by Joe Shirley Jr.
