= Pretty Shield =

American poet

- The cover of Frank Linderman's Pretty Shield biography
- Born: 1856
- Died: 1944 (aged 87–88)
- Citizenship: American
- Spouse: Goes Ahead
- Children: Four girls and three boys
- Parent(s): Kills-in-the-Night, Crazy Sister-in-Law
- Relatives: Ten brothers and sisters; granddaughter, Alma Hogan Snell

Pretty Shield (1856–1944) was a medicine woman of the Crow Nation. Her biography, perhaps the first record of female Native American life, was written by Frank B. Linderman, who interviewed her using an interpreter and sign language.

== Biography ==
Born in 1856 to Kills-in-the-Night and Crazy Sister-in-Law, Pretty Shield was the fourth of eleven children. Her name was given to her by her grandfather when she was four days old and it was considered a name of honor, commemorating her grandfather's handsome war shield.

Pretty Shield had a happy childhood, and later described games played by Crow children. They kicked balls stuffed with antelope hair and slid down snowy hillsides on sleds made of buffalo ribs. When she was seven, she was attacked by a mad buffalo bull. In trying to escape she fell and drove a stick into her forehead and against one eye, leaving a permanent scar. When she was fourteen, Pretty Shield and a group of her friends were treed by a grizzly bear and her cubs. She remembered looking down into the eyes of the grizzly for the rest of her life. She was originally known as the Red Mother. She knew people who knew Native American sign language, which is extremely rare. It was rare for people to give biographical representations of a person through sign language, but even more so through Native American Sign Language.

The happiest days of my life were spent following the buffalo herds over our beautiful country. My mother and father and Goes Ahead, my man, were all kind, and we were so happy. Then when my children came I believed I had everything that was good on this world. There were always so many, many buffalo, plenty of good fat meat for everybody.

Personal Life of Pretty Shield

At sixteen Pretty Shield became the second wife of Goes Ahead, whose first wife was Pretty Shield's older sister. She gave birth to four girls and three boys, but one girl and one boy died as infants. While grieving over their deaths, she had the vision that led her to become a healer. Like other Crow women, Pretty Shield cut her hair short and slashed her arms, legs, and face to show her suffering, then wandered without food or water until her grief became less intense. She wandered upon a woman who led her to an anthill. She told her to rake its edges and then ask for anything she wanted. Pretty Shield asked for "good luck and a good life." After that the ants, "busy, powerful little people," were her medicine.

As a medicine woman, Pretty Shield treated tribal illnesses with medicinal plants and often acted as a counselor. As was customary, she did not charge a fee but was paid in gifts, including tobacco, elks' teeth, buffalo robes, and food.

Pretty Shield's Crow clan, the Sore Lips, had inhabited southeastern Montana for generations. The Crow were regularly at war with the Sioux, Arapahoe, Cheyenne, and Blackfoot tribes. The Crows' bravery is evident in their survival despite being drastically outnumbered by the Native tribes they warred against.

After the death of Goes Ahead, Pretty Shield raised her daughters and nine grandchildren on her own. Talking to Linderman, Pretty Shield expressed a sadness over the disappearing Crow culture. The culture was disappearing for numerous reasons. The reasons included facing the extinction and hunting of too many buffalos in the United States. She believed her people would follow the buffalo herds on the plains forever, as they had done for centuries.

The whole country there smelled of rotting meat. Even the flowers could not put down the bad smell. Our hearts were like stones. And yet nobody believed, even then, that the white man could kill all the buffalo. Since the beginning of things there had always been so many! Even the Lakota, bad as their hearts were for us, would not do such a thing as this; nor the Cheyenne, nor the Arapahoe, nor the Pecunnie; and yet the white man did this, even when he did not want the meat.

== Film ==
- Native Spirit and the Sun Dance Way, 2007 DVD documentary, World Wisdom
