= John Greenwood (executive) =

British businessman and catering executive

John Robert Greenwood (4 June 1950 – 4 May 2008) was a British businessman and catering executive. He was chief executive of the Roadchef chain of motorway service stations from 2001 to 2004.

Born in Bromley in 1950 Greenwood attended The Haberdashers' Aske's Boys' School, he trained to be an accountant passing his exams on his third attempt. In 1975 he joined Balfour Beatty, the engineering and construction group, and four years he later moved to South Africa with his wife. He returned to Britain in 1982. In 1986 he joined Compass, the global catering giant. Within three years he had made managing director of the healthcare division and built up its hospital portfolio to fifteen hospitals and three nursing homes. When the business was sold he moved to Compass's food service operations. In 1998 he made head of Compass Contract Catering in Britain, Ireland and South Africa. He left in 2000 and joined RoadChef.

Greenwood embarked on a £30 million improvement of facilities, overhauled the business's management, culture, food and hygiene standards, and revived staff morale. He built the first toll-road service station, Norton Canes. Greenwood also forged alliances with high street brands, notably Spar, and his decision to introduce Costa Coffee outlets to all RoadChef service areas. He stepped down from RoadChef in 2004 after suffering from motor neuron disease. He had been set to become the first Briton to receive a diaphragm pacemaker, but he became too weak for the operation to go ahead.

Greenwood died on 4 May 2008.
