= Joyce Begay-Foss =

Navajo weaver and educator

Joyce Begay-Foss is a Diné weaver, educator, and curator. She is the director of education at the Museum of Indian Arts & Culture. For her weavings, she has received more than 20 awards at the Santa Fe Indian Market and Eight Northern Pueblos arts and crafts show.

== Life and career ==
Begay-Foss was born in Shiprock, New Mexico. Her parents are Helen (née Smith) and Fred Begay, a physicist and traditional healer. She grew up both in Northern New Mexico and on a Navajo reservation in Arizona. When she was young, she and her family moved to Albuquerque, New Mexico.

She began weaving in her 20s, and started the company Walk In Beauty Fiber Arts in her 30s. She was a curator at the Poeh Museum, leaving the position in the 1990s. In 1998, she became the curator of education at the Museum of Indian Arts and Culture (MIAC), and in 2000, she became director of education for their newly opened Living Traditions Center. In 2008, she was selected as the Chairperson of the Indian Arts and Crafts Board, which combats counterfeits and promotes economic development of Native American arts and crafts.

In 2011, after the two-year exhibit "Spider Woman’s (Na ashje’ii ‘Asdzáá) Gift: Navajo Weaving Traditions" at the MIAC, Begay-Foss was a co-writer of the book "Spider Woman’s Gift: Nineteenth Century Diné Textiles." The book discusses Diné basket and textile weavings from the 1850s to the 1890s. In 2019, Begay-Foss curated the exhibition Lifeways of the Southern Athabaskans at the MIAC, which received an Award of Excellence from the American Association for State and Local History.

Begay-Foss teaches weaving to children and adults. She has won awards for her weavings at the Santa Fe Indian Market and Eight Northern Pueblos arts and crafts show.
