= Torcato Sepúlveda =

Portuguese newspaper journalist

Torcato Sepúlveda (February 27, 1951 – May 21, 2008) was a Portuguese newspaper journalist. His full name was Torcato de Sepúlveda Duarte Macedo. He was known for his book reviews and cultural journalism for several Portuguese newspapers. Sepúlveda was the first cultural editor of the Público, a well-regarded national daily newspaper.

Sepúlveda was born in 1951 in Braga, Portugal, to parents who were elementary school teachers. He received his degree in Romance philology from the University of Coimbra, where he participated in the students demonstrations against António de Oliveira Salazar. For his part in the demonstrations, Sepúlveda lived in exile in Brussels, Belgium, from 1971 until 1974. He did not return to Portugal until April 25, 1974, which coincided with the start of the Carnation Revolution.

Once he returned to Portugal, Sepúlveda began working at the copy desk of the Expresso, weekly publication. He began writing weekly book reviews for the Expresso, which he signed using a shortened version of his name, John Macedo. Sepúlveda also wrote under the pseudonyms of Buíça, Silva of Viseu and D. Luis da Cunha during his career.

Sepúlveda left the Expresso for the Público, a daily national newspaper published in Lisbon. He became the first editor of Público's society and cultural section of the newspaper. He also later worked for the now defunct newspapers, A Capital and O Independente.

Sepúlveda later worked as a journalist for NS, the Saturday magazine supplement for the Diário de Notícias until his death in 2008.

Torcato Sepúlveda died on May 21, 2008, at the age of 57 at the Hospital de Almada in Almada, Portugal, of an undisclosed illness. He had been hospitalized at the Hospital Garcia de Orta for the previous two days.
