= Alma Hogan Snell =

American Crow tribal historian and herbalist

- Crow: Biiaaziite' ("Well Known Woman")

American, Crow Tribe, Greasy Mouth Clan leader

Personal details
- Born: January 10, 1923 Crow Indian Reservation, Montana, U.S.
- Died: May 5, 2008 (aged 85) Billings, Montana, U.S.
- Relations: Pretty Shield (grandmother); Goes Ahead (grandfather)
- Occupation: Herbalist, tribal historian, memoirist, cookbook author, lecturer

Alma Stuart Hogan Snell (January 10, 1923 – May 5, 2008), also known as Biiaaziite', was an American Crow tribal historian, educator, and herbalist. She wrote a cookbook, A Taste of Heritage, and a memoir, Grandmother's Grandchild: My Crow Indian Life.

== Early life and education ==
Snell was born on the Crow Indian Reservation in Montana, the daughter of George W. Hogan and Helen Goes Ahead. She was raised by her maternal grandparents, Pretty Shield and Goes Ahead. She learned Crow traditions, especially foodways and herbal remedies, from her grandmother. "Even as a child," she recalled, "when I heard a bird call, I'd quit playing and I would listen and say 'Aho'. My girlfriends never did that." She attended Flandreau Indian School in South Dakota.

== Career ==
Snell and her husband lived on a farm in the Fort Belknap Indian Reservation, and she worked as a food service supervisor for the Indiah Health Service. Her expertise was sought by ethologists and botanists. She gave demonstrations throughout the United States, at schools, museums and national parks, on the healing properties and benefits of plants, as well as on the subject of health and wellbeing. She wrote a cookbook, A Taste of Heritage, and a memoir, Grandmother's Grandchild: My Crow Indian Life. "She is thoroughly bicultural, a third-generation Christian with formal training as a cook and experience on the national lecture circuit," wrote one reviewer in 2008. The Snells advised on the creation of the National Museum of the American Indian, and founded the Pretty Shield Foundation, which "provides therapeutic foster-care services for Indian youths". She received an honorary doctorate from Montana State University in April 2008.

== Personal life ==
Alma Hogan married a fellow Flandreau student, William F. Snell, in 1947. They had four children. She died in Billings, Montana, at age 85 in May 2008. She was the granddaughter of Pretty Shield and Goes Ahead.

== Publications ==
- A Taste of Heritage: Crow Indian Recipes and Herbal Medicines (2006)
- Grandmother's Grandchild: My Crow Indian Life (2000)
