= Edward T. Begay =

Native American politician (1935–2022)

3rd Speaker of the Navajo Nation Council
- In office January 1, 1999 – January 1, 2003
- President: Kelsey Begaye
- Preceded by: Kelsey Begaye
- Succeeded by: Lawrence T. Morgan

13th Vice Chairman of the Navajo Nation
- In office 1983–1987
- Preceded by: Frank E. Paul
- Succeeded by: Johnny R. Thompson

Personal details
- Born: January 8, 1935 Tse Yaaniichii, New Mexico, U.S.
- Died: June 12, 2022 (aged 87) Albuquerque, New Mexico, U.S.
- Occupation: Government

Edward Thomas Begay (January 8, 1935 – June 12, 2022) was a Native American politician who served as the Speaker of the Navajo Nation from 1999 to 2003. He also served as Vice-Chairman in 1983 under the Chairmanship of then Chairman Peterson Zah. Begay was a major influence in the Churchrock/Bááh Háálį́ community, and was active within Chapter Affairs.

Begay served in the United States Army. He also served on the McKinley County Commission. He died on June 12, 2022, at the age of 87 in Albuquerque.
