= Per Nielsen (sport shooter) =

Danish sports shooter (1919–2008)

Personal information
- Born: 5 June 1919 Aalborg, Denmark
- Died: 27 May 2008 (aged 88)

Sport
- Sport: Sports shooting

Per Nielsen (5 June 1919 – 27 May 2008) was a Danish sports shooter. He competed at the 1952 Summer Olympics and 1960 Summer Olympics.
