= Enei Begaye =

American activist

Enei Begaye, of the Diné (Navajo) & Tohono O'odham nations, is an activist and advocate for Indigenous peoples rights and the environment. Enei is an experienced grassroots organizer, speaker, writer, and strategist. She is the Executive Director of Native Movement, an Alaska-based social justice advocacy non-profit organization. She has been married to Mr. Evon Peter, Vice Chancellor for Rural, Community & Native Education, University of Alaska Fairbanks since 2003.

== Activism ==
Enei is co-founder and active board member of the Black Mesa Water Coalition, a grassroots organization working to address energy and water exploitation on the Navajo and Hopi Reservations. She also co-founded the Native Movement Collective, a non profit working to build and strengthen community and positive relationships between all people, as well as the Native Movement to help build healthy and sustainable Indigenous communities. Enei has also worked as a water campaigner for the Indigenous Environmental Network where she works with Indigenous communities throughout the United States to protect their water resources.

In discussing Indigenous peoples' Environmental efforts, Enei has said: "A green economy is nothing new to Indigenous peoples, we have been practicing this way of life in harmony with Mother Earth before Wall Street. But today, what we strive to do is unite the modern non-polluting technologies, such as wind and solar, with the tradition technologies, such as weaving and farming; and with that unity we can open up new doors of opportunity for ALL our people - young and old, college educated and land educated alike."

== Awards ==
- Arizona's native American "Woman of Our Community" Award
- Southwest's "Water Guardian" Award
- Utne Reader's "50 Visionaries Who are Changing Your World"
