= Arthur C. Begay =

American painter

- Born: December 15, 1932; Newcomb, New Mexico
- Died: 2010 (aged 77–78)
- Occupation: painter

"Girl Rug Weaver and Her Goats," circa 1990

Arthur C. Begay (December 15, 1932 – 2010) was a Navajo American painter born in Newcomb, New Mexico. Begay has exhibited his work across the country and is known for his colorful, flat style paintings. Some of his works are in the permanent collection of institutions including the Smithsonian National Museum of the American Indian.

Begay's work included depictions of everyday life, often with scenic backgrounds including Monument Valley and Shiprock. After winning a fellowship, Begay worked for a year in the 1950s studying with illustrator Norman Rockwell at his workshop in Westport, Connecticut. Begay's work often shows this influence.

Begay attended Phoenix High School. He lived much of his life in Shiprock, New Mexico. In addition to exhibiting at galleries and fairs, his work was sold in local trading posts.
