= Fred Begay =

Native American nuclear physicist (1932–2013)

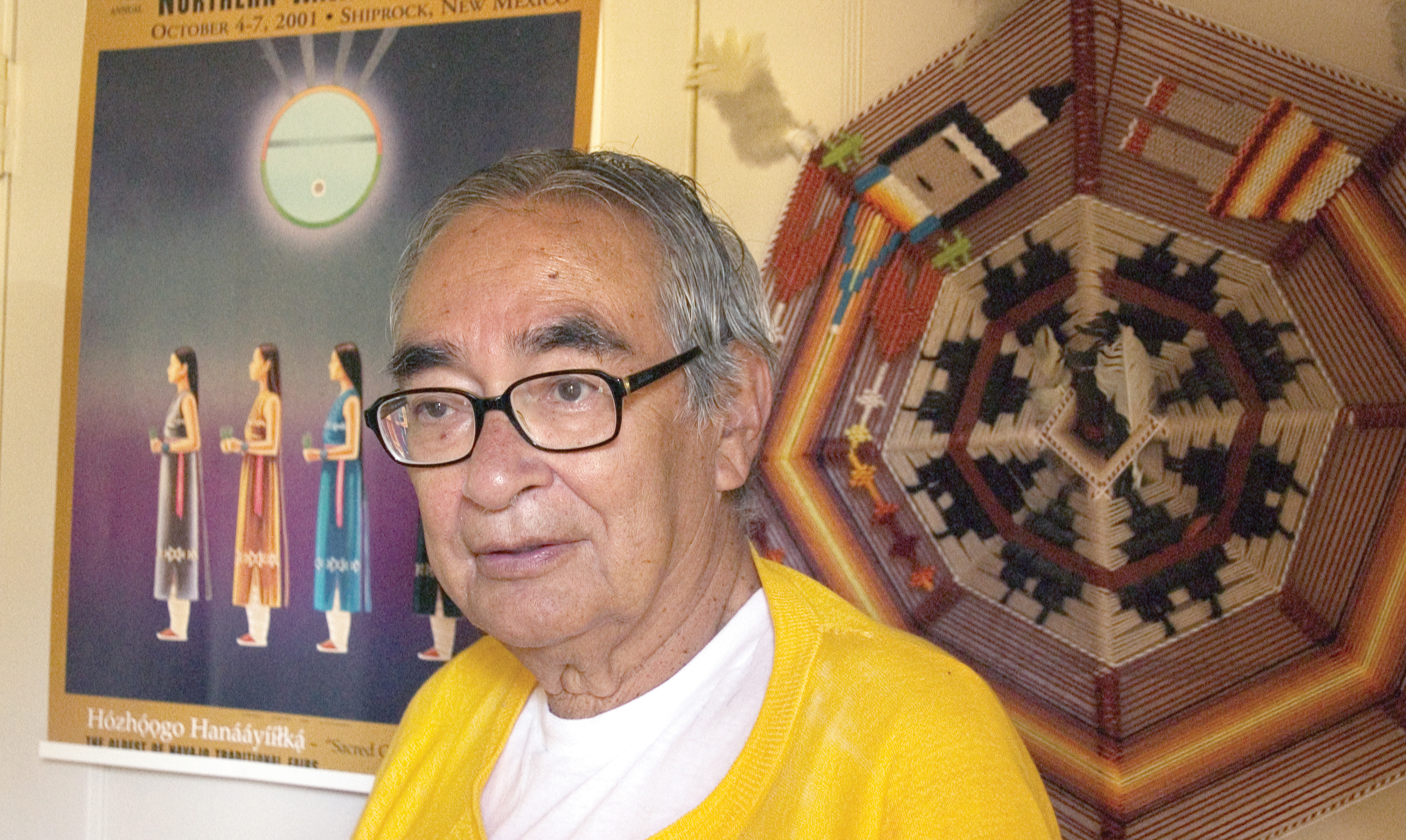
- Photo of Dr. Fred Begay distributed on the occasion of his election to the New York Academy of Sciences.
- Born: July 2, 1932; Towaoc, Colorado
- Died: April 30, 2013 (aged 80)
- Citizenship: Navajo, Ute
- Education: University of New Mexico (B.S, M.S., PhD)
- Spouse: Helen Smith
- Children: 8
- Scientific career
- Fields: Nuclear physics
- Thesis: Development of the OSO-6 High-Energy Neutron Detector and Correlation of Measured Solar Neutron Fluxes to Solar Flares (1971)
- Doctoral advisor: C.P. Leavitt

Fred Begay (July 2, 1932 – April 30, 2013), also Fred Young or Clever Fox, was a Navajo/Ute nuclear physicist. Begay was born in Towaoc, Colorado on the Ute Mountain Indian Reservation. His work was in the alternative use of laser, electron and ion beams to heat thermonuclear plasmas for use as alternative energy sources. He was the first Navajo to earn a Ph.D. in physics.

== Early life ==
Fred Begay was born in Towaoc, Colorado, on the Ute Mountain Indian Reservation. He was the son of Joy Lopez (Navajo, Ute) and Hosteen Begay (Navajo). Fred Begay was only six when his mother and father, both Navajo healers, began teaching him the songs of the Blessingway ceremony. Begay spoke both Indigenous languages from his mother and father but did not learn English until age 10, when he attended a Bureau of Indian Affairs school in Ignacio, Colorado. He was not allowed to speak Navajo at the school or attend Indian religious cermonies, and his name was changed to Fred Young. The teachers there trained him to be a farmer until he turned 18.

He left the school without graduating and enlisted in the Army during the Korean War period. Begay served non-commissioned officer in the US Air Force during 1951-1955 and was assigned to an air-rescue squadron in Korea. In 1952, he married Helen Smith from Shiprock. When he came home in 1955, he returned to his mother's 30-acre farm with the intention of growing corn and raising children. Helen and Fred Begay had eight children: Fred Jr, Joyce, William, Janet, Terry, Christina, John and Carolyn.

== Science career ==
Begay's tribe paid for him to attend the University of New Mexico (UNM), where he earned a bachelor's degree in math and science with honors in 1961. He got master's degree in physics in 1963 and a doctorate in nuclear physics in 1971. He joined the physics staff of Los Alamos National Laboratory. He was also part of a NASA-funded space physics research team at UNM to conduct fundamental studies on the origin of high energy gamma rays and solar neutrons from 1960-1963 and again from 1965-1972. He also held research and teaching fellowships at Stanford University and the University of Maryland. Begay also had a tenure of nearly 30 years in the Los Alamos National Laboratory's laser program.

Begay was profiled in the 1979 NOVA documentary The Long Walk of Fred Young.
