= Heather Stohler =

American model (1979–2008)

- Born: Heather Stohler; November 29, 1978; Greenfield, Indiana, U.S.
- Died: May 11, 2008 (aged 29); Vincennes, Indiana, U.S.
- Partner: Daniel Risley
- Modeling information
- Height: 5 ft 10 in (1.78 m)
- Hair color: Dark blonde
- Eye color: Green

Heather Stohler Arrick (born Heather Stohler; November 29, 1978 – May 11, 2008) was an American model.

== Life and career ==
Born as Heather Stohler in Greenfield, Indiana, on November 29, 1978, to Dave Goodwin and Angela Stohler, she was later adopted by her aunt and uncle, Ron and Jackie Arrick, at age four.

During her short career she worked on photoshoots with Kate Moss for Calvin Klein and also appeared on the covers of Vogue Italia, shot by Steven Meisel, and German Marie Claire. She also worked on several European catwalk shows. By the time she died in 2008, it was noted that she had stopped modeling several years prior and had lived in Florida before returning to Indiana. She had also spent a year living in Australia.

== Personal life and death ==
At the time of her death, Stohler lived in Vincennes, Indiana, with her boyfriend, Daniel Risley. On the morning of May 11, 2008, the couple were fatally injured in a fire at their apartment, which appeared to have started in their kitchen. Stohler, 29, died from smoke inhalation at Vincennes' Good Samaritan Hospital later that day; Risley, 26, died from his injuries at Wishard Memorial Hospital in Indianapolis on May 13.
