= Daniel Sekhoto =

South African soccer player (1970–2008)

Personal information
- Date of birth: 1 November 1970
- Date of death: 2 May 2008 (aged 37)
- Place of death: Bethlehem, South Africa

Senior career*
Years	Team	Apps	(Gls)
- D'Alberton Callies
- Orlando Pirates
- Free State Stars
- Kaizer Chiefs
–2001	Santos		
- * Club domestic league appearances and goals

Daniel Sekhoto (1 November 1970 – 2 May 2008) was a South African professional footballer who played as a midfielder.
