= Jerry C. Begay =

WWII Navajo Code Talker (1924–2008)

Jerry ClasChee Begay Sr. (December 8, 1924 – May 26, 2008) was an American World War II veteran and a member of the Navajo Code Talkers.

== Life ==
Begay was born on December 8, 1924, in Sheep Springs, New Mexico. His parents were Clauschee Begay and Hashtłʼishnii Bistʼi. He was a member of the Kinlichíiʼnii clan and was born for the Dziłtłʼahnii. Begay attended Toadlena Boarding School and Fort Wingate High School.

He enlisted in the United States Marines when he was 17 years old while he was still a student at Fort Wingate High School. He served in the Second Marine division, 297th Platoon, as a Navajo Code Talker during World War II. Among the battles in which he served was the American invasion of the island of Tarawa, in present-day Kiribati. Begay was wounded during World War II and was awarded the Purple Heart. Begay was also awarded the Sharpshooters Medal, the World War II Victory Medal, the Presidential Unit Citation and the Asiatic Pacific Campaign Medal with Bronze Star for his service. Begay received an honorable discharge and left the U.S. Marines in 1945.

Begay began working at the Phelps Dodge Copper Mining Company in Morenci, Arizona, shortly after the end of World War II. He remained at the company for 33 years until his retirement in 1982. He also worked in community service, including at the Tsaile Health Center, in the towns of Tsaile and Lukachukai.

Throughout his life, Begay remained active in the Navajo Code Talkers Association and the Disabled American Veterans. He was awarded the Congressional Silver Medal of Honor in November 2001 for his service as a code talker, alongside fellow veteran code talkers such as Frank Tsosie Thompson.

Jerry C. Begay died on Memorial Day on May 26, 2008, in Albuquerque, New Mexico, at the age of 83. His funeral and burial took place at St. Mary's Catholic Church and Memory Gardens in Farmington, New Mexico. Begay, who was a resident of Lukachukai, Arizona, was survived by his wife, Ella Sorrelman Begay, and his children: Jerry C. Begay Jr., Daniel C. Begay, Priscilla Begay Coutu and Verna Begay Lopez. He was preceded in death by one daughter, Evangeline Begay Alvarez.
