= Justin Yak =

South Sudanese politician

Justin Yak was a Southern Sudan minister for cabinet affairs who died in a plane crash that killed 21 other people 375 km west of Juba, Sudan on 2 May 2008. Bad weather is believed to have been the cause of the plane crash.
