= Izold Pustõlnik =

Estonian astronomer

- Born: March 17, 1938; Odesa, Ukraine
- Died: May 2, 2008 (aged 70); Tartu, Estonia
- Education: University of Tartu (Ph.D.)

Izold Pustõlnik (Изольд Бенционович Пустыльник, Izold Bentsionovich Pustylnik; 17 March 1938 in Odesa, Ukrainian SSR – 2 May 2008 in Tartu, Estonia) was an eminent Estonian astronomer who authored numerous scientific publications and served as editor of the Central European Journal of Physics and vice-chairman of the non-profit organization Euroscience Estonia.

A native of the Ukrainian port city of Odesa (a part of the Soviet Union until 1991), Izold Pustõlnik graduated cum laude from Odesa University in 1960 and received his Ph.D. from the University of Tartu in 1969 and his D.Sc. from Saint Petersburg State University in 1994. From the age of 27 in 1965 until his death forty-three years later, he was on the staff of Tartu Observatory where, as a research associate (promoted to senior research associate in 2000), he worked on the physics of close binary systems, theory of stellar atmospheres, interstellar medium, archaeoastronomy and history of astronomy. He was also a member of the International Astronomical Union, European Astronomical Society, Euroscience, Society for European Astronomy in Culture (SEAC) and served on the board of Euro-Asian Astronomical Society and the advisory board of Astronomical and Astrophysical Transactions.

Izold Pustõlnik died in Tartu eight weeks after his 70th birthday. In 2011 asteroid 11832 (1984 SC6) discovered by Belgian astronomer Henri Debehogne on September 21, 1984 was named after Izold Pustõlnik.

Finally, Izold Pustõlnik is related to Galina Pustylnik, Stan Pustylnik, Irina Pustylnik, Miriam Pustylnik, David Pustylnik, Esther Pustylnik, Olga Farber, Adi Farber, and Noa Farber.

== See also ==
- Euroscience
