= Josephine Apieu Jenaro Aken =

South Sudanese revolutionary

Josephine Apieu Jenaro Akena
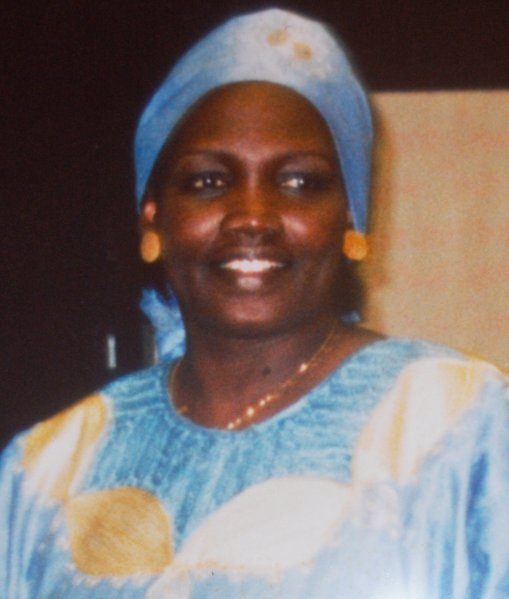
- Aken in 2005

Personal details
- Born: 1 May 1955 Western Bahr el Ghazal, Anglo-Egyptian Sudan (now South Sudan)
- Died: 2 May 2008 (aged 53) Juba, South Sudan
- Party: Sudan People's Liberation Movement

Josephine Apieu Jenaro Aken (1 May 1955 – 2 May 2008), a member of the Luo group from the Bahr el Ghazal area, was born in Wau, Western Bahr el Ghazal, South Sudan. She was a member of the Sudan People's Liberation Movement.

== Early life and education ==
Josephine Aken was born in Wau, South Sudan and studied telecommunications at Juba Training Centre in Khartoum. She later went to the UK to study business at the Open University.

== Career ==
Josephine Aken started her career as a postal office worker. From 1973 to 1976, she worked at the Department of Education in South Sudan. In 1976, she shifted her career to coordination and worked in Khartoum until 1987. In 1987, Aken moved to the United Kingdom. She co-created the SWA in February 1991 and was the organization's chair from 1994 to 2000. After resigning from her seat as chair, she became the SWA's coordinator.

== Politics ==
Before joining the Government of South Sudan, she was the Director of the Sudan Women Association based in London Abbey Community Centre, Kilburn, London, UK. She was a senior civil servant in the Government of Southern Sudan. From 1994 to 2008, Aken served in the National Liberation Council for the Sudan People's Liberation Movement (SPLM).

== Charity work ==
In 2000, Josephine Aken was appointed the chair for the Camden And Westminster Refugee Training Partnership. She remained at the charity until 2004. A few years later, in 2006, Aken moved back to South Sudan and was selected to direct the Southern Sudan Employees Justice Commission (SSJEC).

== Death ==
On 2 May 2008, Josephine Aken died in a plane crash alongside her husband Minister for SPLA Affairs General Dominic Dim Deng, in Juba, Sudan.
