= Exuperius and Zoe =

Married couple of saints

Saints Exuperius and Zoe
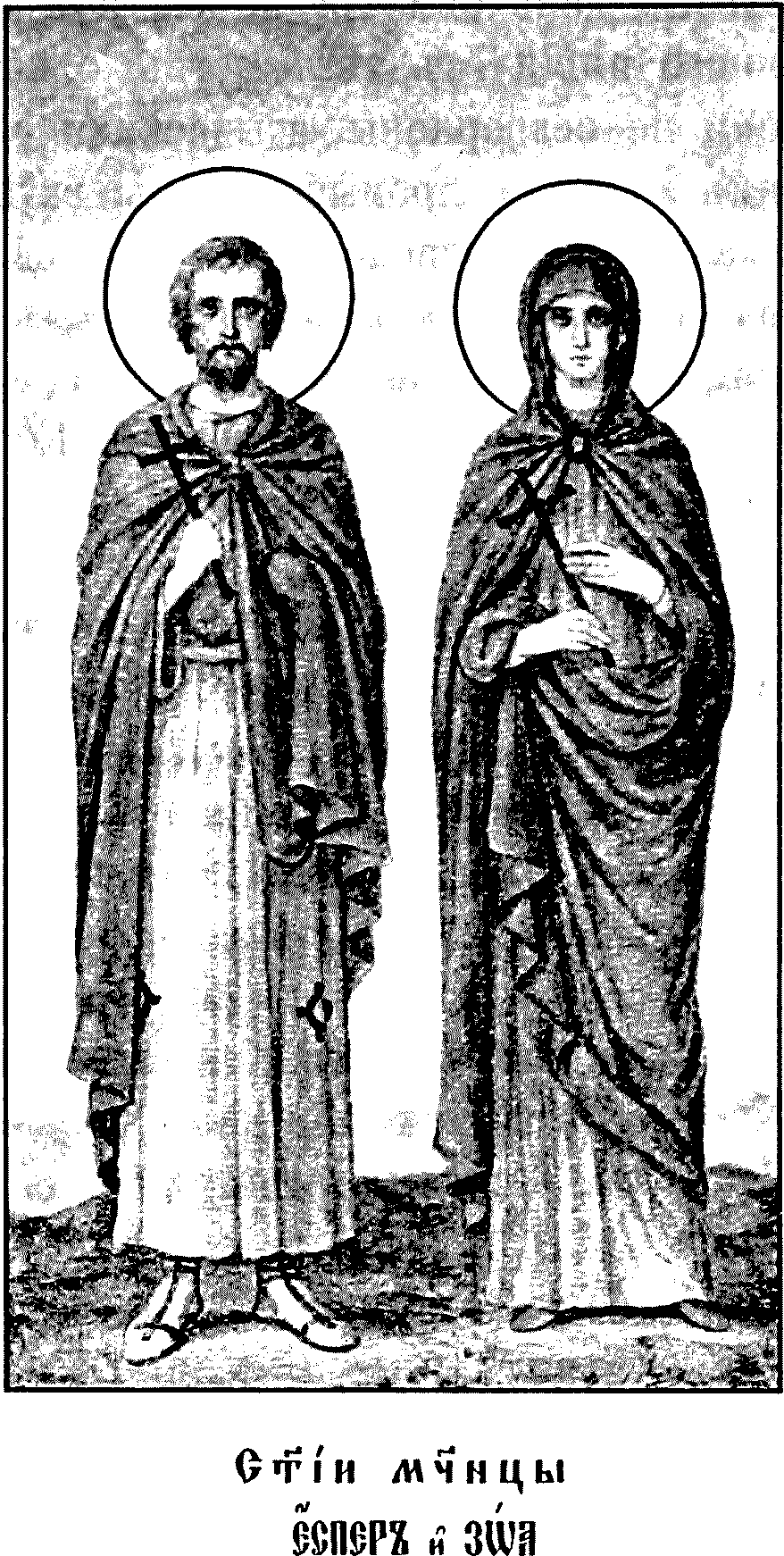

Martyrs
- Died: 127
- Venerated in: Roman Catholic Church; Eastern Orthodox Church
- Canonized: Pre-congregation
- Feast: 2 May

Exuperius and Zoe are Christian martyrs who were murdered in 127. They were spouses and slaves of a pagan in Pamphylia, in modern Turkey. They were murdered with their sons, Cyriacus and Theodolus, for refusing to participate in pagan rites when one of their sons was born.
