= Germanus of Normandy =

Saint Germanus of Normandy
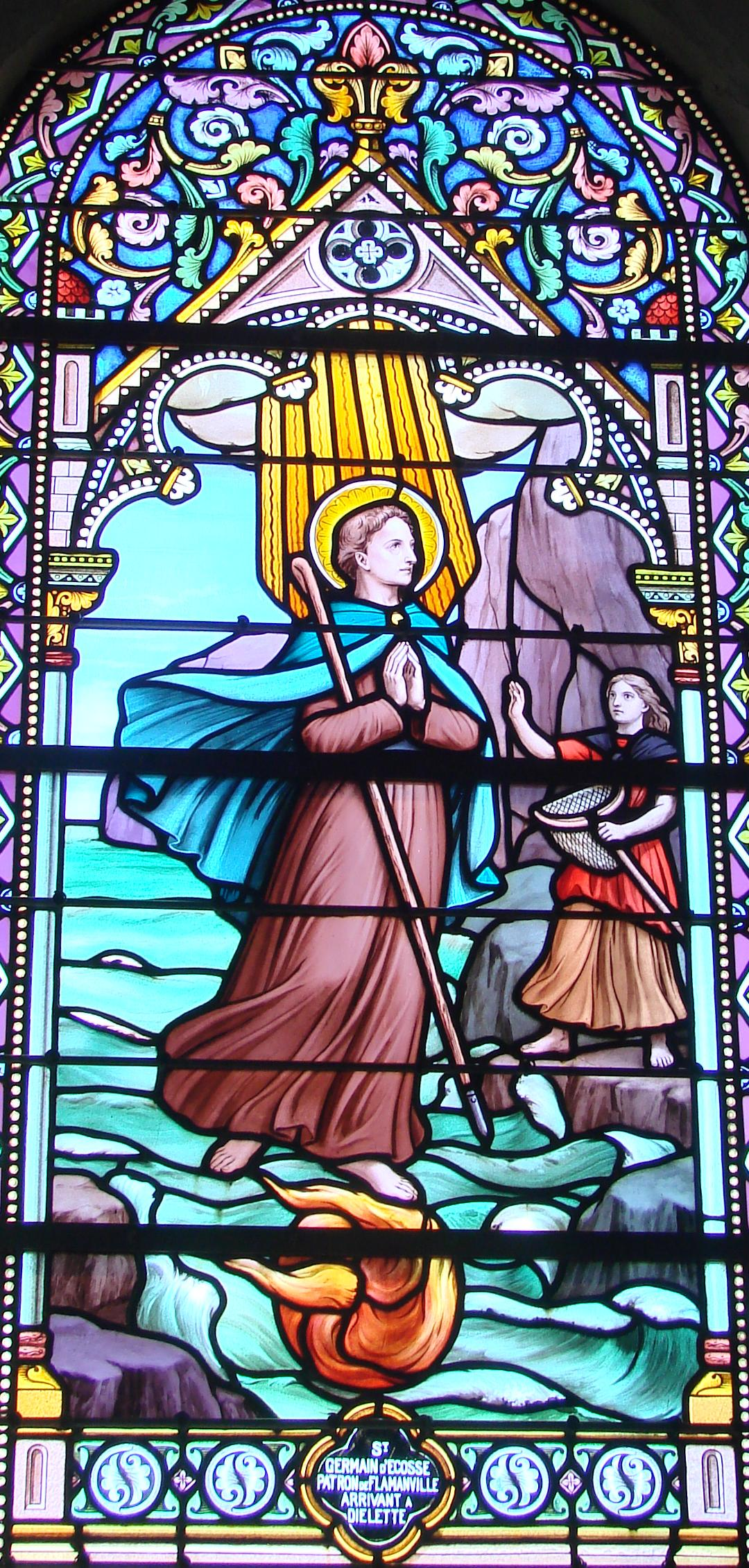
- Stained glass image of Saint Germanus arriving in Diélette, in the church of Saint-Germain de Flamanville
- Died: 480 AD
- Venerated in: Roman Catholic Church; Anglican Communion; Eastern Orthodox Church
- Feast: 2 May
- Attributes: wheel or dragon

Germanus of Normandy, also known as Germanus the Scot (French: Germain le Scot), is a Christian saint venerated especially in Normandy. He was a disciple of Germanus of Auxerre, from whom he took his baptismal name.

In iconography he is frequently represented with a wheel, representing the legend that he crossed the English Channel on a wheel and arrived in Normandy near Flamanville, or with a dragon, representing the legend that he killed a seven-headed dragon at Trou Baligan in the Cotentin.

His aid is invoked for the relief of fevers and for illnesses of children.

== Bibliography ==
- Les Saints qui guérissent en Normandie, Gancel, 1998, ISBN 2-7373-2293-6
