= Ceresoli =

Ceresoli is an Italian surname. Notable people with the surname include:

- Carlo Ceresoli (1910–1995), Italian footballer
- Lorenzo Ceresoli (1931–2024), Italian Roman Catholic bishop
- Maurizio Ceresoli (born 1983), Italian race-driver
- Ettore Ceresoli (born 1970), Italian high jumper
