= Caino =

Caino Caì
- Comune
- Comune di Caino
- Coat of arms

- Location within Italy Location within Lombardy
- Coordinates: 45°37′N 10°19′E
- Country: Italy
- Region: Lombardy
- Province: Province of Brescia (BS)

Government
  - Mayor: Cesare Sambrici (from 26/05/2014)

Area
  - Total: 17 km^{2} (6.6 sq mi)
- Elevation: 385 m (1,263 ft)

Population (2011)
  - Total: 2,123
  - Density: 120/km^{2} (320/sq mi)
- Time zone: UTC+1 (CET)
  - Summer (DST): UTC+2 (CEST)
- Postal code: 25070
- Dialing code: 030
- Patron saint: Saint Zeno
- Saint day: April 12
- Website: Official website

Caino (Brescian: Caì) is a comune in the province of Brescia, in Lombardy located in the Valle del Garza. It is bounded by other communes of Nave and Lumezzane.

== Geography ==
Caino is distant almost 12 km (7,46 mi) from Brescia. It borders with other five communes: Agnosine, Lumezzane, Nave, Serle and Vallio Terme. It's located in the Valle del Garza, literally translated Garza's Valley. Garza is the stream which passes through the comune, its headwaters are in Lumezzane.

== Topography ==
The comune of Caino is divided into 14 streets (vie in Italian):

- Via Nazionale, the main street which connects Caino with the adjacent communes and which is part of the Strada Provinciale 237;
- Via Bagnolo;
- Via Follo;
- Via San Rocco;
- Via Grignole;
- Via Pianzano;
- Via Villa Sera;
- Via Fucina;
- Via Micinigo;
- Via Don Gino Pirlo;
- Via Folletto;
- Via Villa Mattina;
- Via Rasile;
- Via Tolzana.

The city hall is located in Via Villa Mattina, 9. The library in Via Folletto, 2. The sport center in Via Rasile. The Parish with the main church in Via Folletto 7/B.
