= Apostolic Vicariate of Awasa =

Catholic missionary jurisdiction in Ethiopia

Apostolic Vicariate of Awasa Vicariatus Apostolicus Avasanus

Location
- Country: Ethiopia
- Metropolitan: Immediately subject to the Holy See

Statistics
- Area: 75,000 km^{2} (29,000 sq mi)
- Population: Total; Catholics: (as of 2004); 5,600,000; 157,417 (2.8%)

Information
- Rite: Latin Rite

Current leadership
- Bishop: Merhakristos Gobezayehu Getachew Yilma
- Apostolic Administrator: Formerly, Father Juan González Núñez

Map
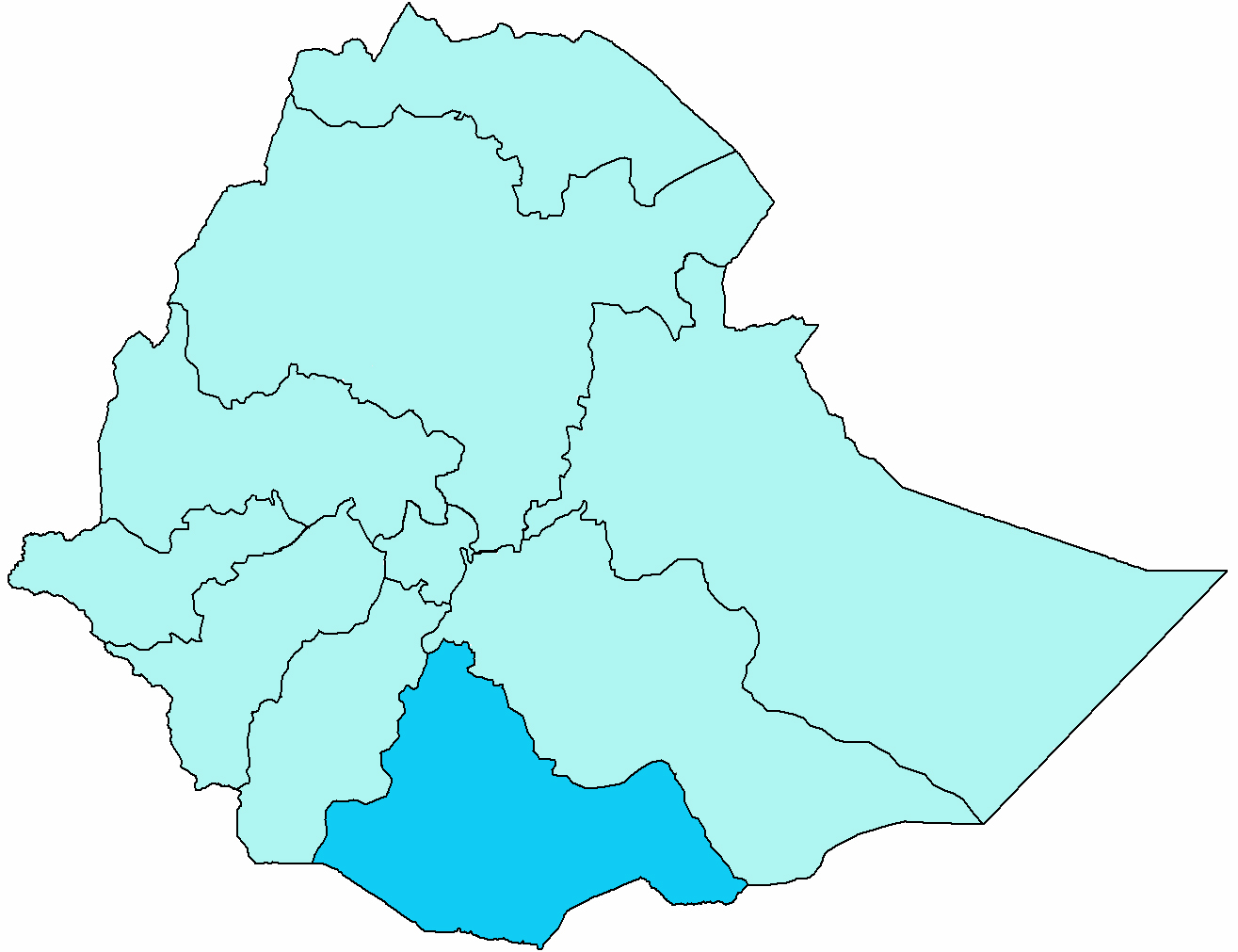

The Apostolic Vicariate of Awasa (Latin: Vicariatus Apostolicus Avasanus) is a Roman Catholic Apostolic Vicariate in central Ethiopia.

It is exempt, i.e. directly dependent on the Holy See (notably the Roman missionary Congregation for the Evangelization of Peoples), not part of any ecclesiastical province.

Its cathedral episcopal see is the Kidane Mehret Cathedral located in the city of Awasa, on the shores of Lake Awasa in the Great Rift Valley.

The Vicariate of Awasa comprises the following:

Southern Nations and Nationalities Peoples Representatives State (SNNPRSRS):

1. Sidama zone
2. Gedeo zone
3. Amaaro (special Wereda (District)
4. Burji (special Wereda (District)

Oromia region:

1. Guji zone
2. Borana Zone

Somali region:

1. Liben Zone

== History ==
- Established on March 25, 1937 as the Apostolic Prefecture of Neghelli, on Ethiopian territories split off from the then Apostolic Vicariate of Galla and Apostolic Prefecture of Kaffa
- On 1940.02.13 it lost territory to establish the then Apostolic Prefecture of Hosanna
- Renamed after its see on October 15, 1969 as the Apostolic Prefecture of Awasa
- Promoted on March 15, 1979 as the Apostolic Vicariate of Awasa, hence entitled to a titular bishop.

== Ordinaries ==
(all Roman rite; so far missionary members of Latin congregations)

Apostolic Prefects of Neghelli

- Fr. Gabriele Arosio, Pontifical Institute for Foreign Missions (P.I.M.E.) (May 21, 1937 – death 1945)
- Urbain-Marie Person, Capuchin Franciscans (O.F.M. Cap.) (January 2, 1952 – October 15, 1969 see below); also Apostolic Administrator of Harar (below) (1952 – 1955.07.03), Apostolic Administrator of Apostolic Vicariate of Gimma (Ethiopia) (1952–1958), Apostolic Administrator of Apostolic Prefecture of Hosanna (Ethiopia) (1952.01.02 – 1972); Titular Bishop of Cyme (1955.07.03 – 1994.02.09) & Apostolic Vicar of Harar (Ethiopia) (1955.07.03 – 1981.12.04)

Apostolic Prefects of Awasa (Hawassa / Auasa)

- Urbain-Marie Person, Capuchin Franciscans (O.F.M. Cap.) (see above October 15, 1969 – retired February 16, 1973)
- Fr. Armido Gasparini, Comboni Missionaries of the Heart of Jesus (M.C.C.I.) (February 16, 1973 – March 15, 1979 see below)

Apostolic Vicars of Awasa

- Armido Gasparini, M.C.C.I. (see above March 15, 1979 – December 20, 1993), Titular Bishop of Magnetum (1979.03.15 – death 2004.10.21)
- Lorenzo Ceresoli, M.C.C.I. (December 20, 1993 – retired March 21, 2009), Titular Bishop of Fallaba (1993.12.20 – ...)
- Giovanni Migliorati, M.C.C.I. (March 21, 2009 – May 12, 2016), Titular Bishop of Ambia (2009.03.21 – death 2016.05.12)
- Roberto Bergamaschi, S.D.B. (2016.06.29 - ...)
