= Ahmed Rezzak =

- Born: 1967 (age 58–59); Southern Algeria
- Citizenship: Algerian
- Occupations: Director, playwright, film director, actor
- Notable work: Lotfi; Krim Belkacem; Mostefa Ben Boulaid

Ahmed Rezzak born in Djelfa is an Algerian theatre director, playwright, film director and actor. He has written and staged about twenty plays since the 1990s and also appears as an actor in several historical films and television movies. His theatrical work, often described as political and social, has received awards at several national festivals.

== Biography ==
Born on 26 February 1967 in Djelfa, Ahmed Rezzak graduated in 1992 from the National Institute of Dramatic Arts. He has written more than twenty plays. His artistic engagement frequently addresses contemporary social and political themes.

== Career ==
=== Theatre ===
Ahmed Rezzak is known for his work as a playwright and director. He authored and staged notable plays such as Khatini (Grand Prize at the National Festival of Professional Theatre, FNTP, 2021), Posticha, El Tafihoun (Best Direction award ex-aequo at FNTP 2022/2023), Palestine trahie, and the epic stage production Rouh El Djazaïr. His works have been produced on national stages (TNA) and regional venues.

=== Film and television ===
Ahmed Rezzak also appears as an actor in several Algerian feature films and telefilms, notably in works by Ahmed Rachedi and other directors dealing with historical figures and national contexts. He has roles in productions such as Mostefa Ben Boulaïd (2008), Krim Belkacem (2014), Lotfi (2015), El Achiq (2017) and more recently Deux hommes un destin (2024).

== Major works ==
=== Selected theatre ===
- Khatini — Grand Prize, 14th National Festival of Professional Theatre (FNTP), 2021.
- Posticha — Frequently staged at the TNA (Mahieddine-Bachtarzi National Theatre).
- El Tafihoun — Best Direction (ex-aequo) at the FNTP.
- Palestine trahie — Presented at the House of Culture; an ode to Palestinian resistance.
- Rouh El Djazaïr — Epic production staged for the 70th anniversary of the start of the Algerian war of independence.

=== Selected film / television ===
- Mostefa Ben Boulaïd (film) (2008) — actor (role: Ajel Ajoul).
- Krim Belkacem (2014) — cast (role: Amar Ouamrane).
- Lotfi (2015) — credited on IMDb
- El Achiq (2017) — director/actor.
- Deux hommes un destin (2024) — actor.

== Selected filmography ==
- 2008 — Mostefa Ben Boulaid — actor (Ajel Ajoul).
- 2014 — Krim Belkacem — actor (Amar Ouamrane).
- 2015 — Lotfi — credited (IMDb).
- 2017 — El Achiq — (IMDb).
- 2024 — Deux hommes un destin — actor.

== Reception and awards ==
- Grand Prize at the 14th National Festival of Professional Theatre (FNTP) for Khatini (2021).
- Best Direction (ex-aequo) at the FNTP for El Tafihoun (2022/2023).
