= Giovanni Migliorati =

Giovanni Migliorati may refer to:

- Giovanni Migliorati (cardinal), (died in 1410), Italian Roman Catholic cardinal (since 1405), Archbishop of Ravenna (1400–1405)
- Giovanni Migliorati (bishop), (1942–2016), Italian-born Ethiopian Roman Catholic prelate, Vicar Apostolic of Awasa (2009–2016)
