= Djelfa District =

- District
- Country: Algeria
- Province: Djelfa Province
- Capital: Djelfa
- Time zone: UTC+1 (CET)

Djelfa district is an Algerian administrative district in the Djelfa province. Its capital is the town of Djelfa.

== Communes ==
The district is composed of only one commune: Djelfa.
