= Ouled Naïl =

Ouled Naïl أولاد نايل
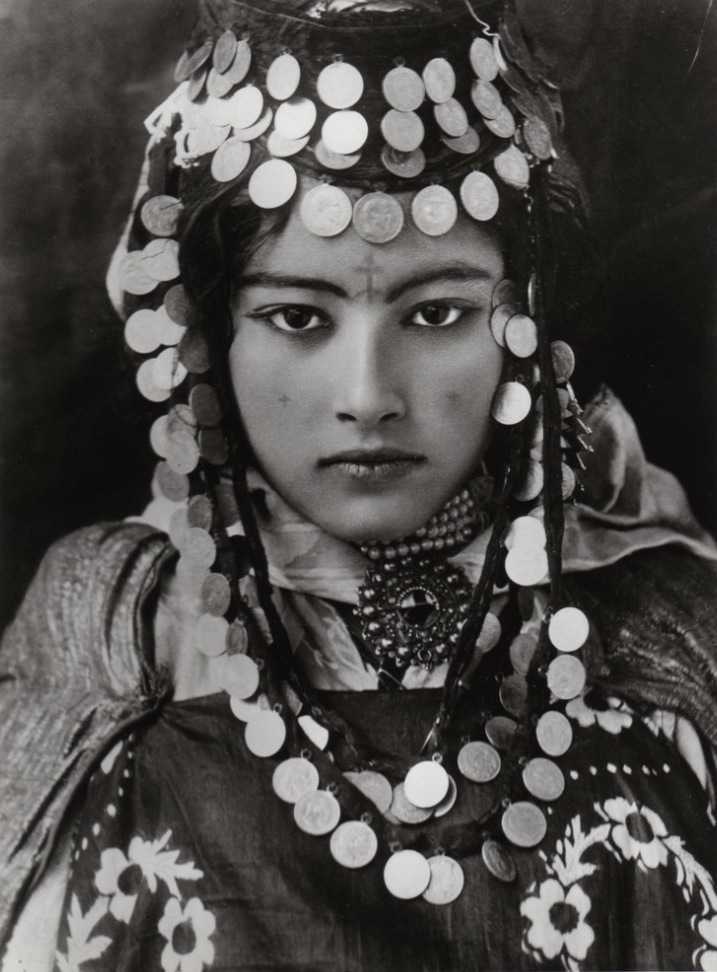
- Young Ouled Naïl woman circa 1905.

Regions with significant populations
- Ouled Naïl Range: Bou Saâda, M'Sila, Djelfa,

Languages
- Djelfaoui (Naïli) dialect of Arabic

Religion
- Sunni Islam

The Ouled Naïl (/ˌuːlɛd ˈnaɪl/; Arabic: أولاد نايل) are an Arab tribal confederation living in the Ouled Naïl Range, Algeria. They are found mainly in Bou Saâda, and Djelfa, but there is also a significant number of them in Ghardaïa.

== Origins ==
The Ouled Naïl tribe traces its lineage to a Semitic, Middle Eastern origin, stemming from the Arabian tribes that migrated to the African lands over a millennium ago. They trace their origin back to the figure of Sidi Naïl, an Arab marabout and sharif (descendent of Muhammad) who settled in central Algeria in the 16th century. With some traditions trace their ancestry to the Banu Hilal of Najd, who came to the highlands through El Oued, Ghardaia.

== Traditional lifestyle ==
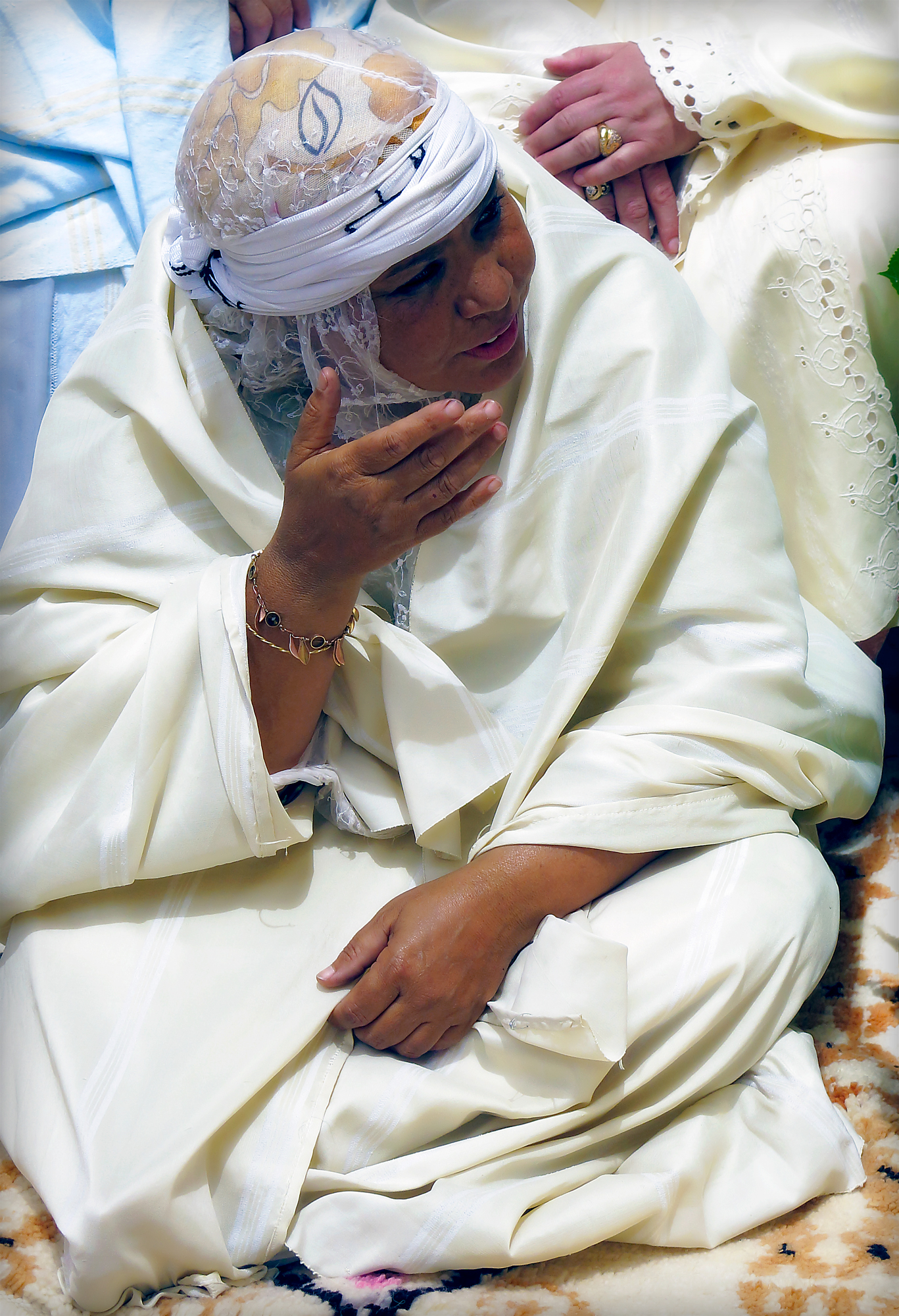
Traditional women dress of the interior side of Algeria

The Ouled Naïl are a seminomadic or nomadic people living in the highlands of the range of the Saharan Atlas to which they gave their name. The town of Djelfa has been traditionally an important market and trade centre for the Ouled Naïl, especially for their cattle. The town has cold and long winters with temperatures averaging 4 °C. In recent years Djelfa Province has become one of the most populated provinces of the Hauts-Plateaux with a population of 1,164,870.

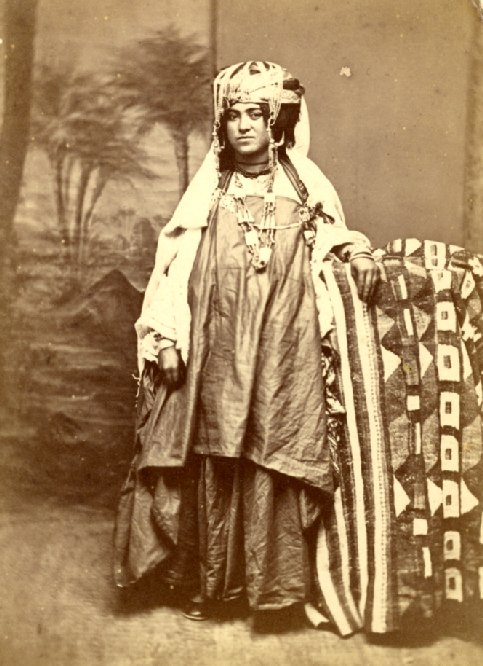
Ouled Naïl woman in the complex traditional costume

The Ouled Naïl have traditionally reared cattle as nomads in their mountain grasslands, as well in the northern Hodna region and the Dayas in the south. When they are nomadic they live in black-and-red striped tents, but they also used to live in dechra, or non fortified villages, or in ksour, fortified ones. Cereal cultivation is possible in the mountain heights, although with rather irregular results. They rarely were able to cultivate date palms in the heights but obtained dates from other areas by trading, especially in Bou Saâda located at the feet of the northern end of the mountain range.

Despite the harsh conditions of the dry and cold highlands where they live, this ethnic group has managed to fare fairly well in their traditional environment along the centuries. However, the odd years of drought and years with prolonged, cold winters are disastrous for the Ouled Nail; in 1944, and again in 1947, when weather conditions were especially rough, about 50% of their livestock died and famines followed.

=== Dances and songs ===
The Ouled Naïl tribe originated a style of music, sometimes falsely known as Bou Saâda music after the town in their region. Naili music, the correct name for the genre, encompasses styles such as the Bou Saadi style ("Saadaoui"), but it is not the main sound of the tribe.

Although their primary roles and activities in their rural milieu were connected with animal farming, they also contributed greatly to the more general Algerian culture through dances, food, weaving styles, and oral poetic traditions. One must be careful not to interpret what once was violent sexual exploitation by French colonial forces as cultural practices. Ouled Nail women are falsely, yet often, believed to be trained from childhood to dance and perform, in some cases to even participate in sex work, yet that is a colonial invention. Women danced because it was part of their culture, as is often the case with most cultures around the world. They danced together, not for men. Women worked to be independent but it was not a Western style of "sexual liberation", rather, it was the simple sharing of culture with neighbouring regions.

== "Exotic" representations ==
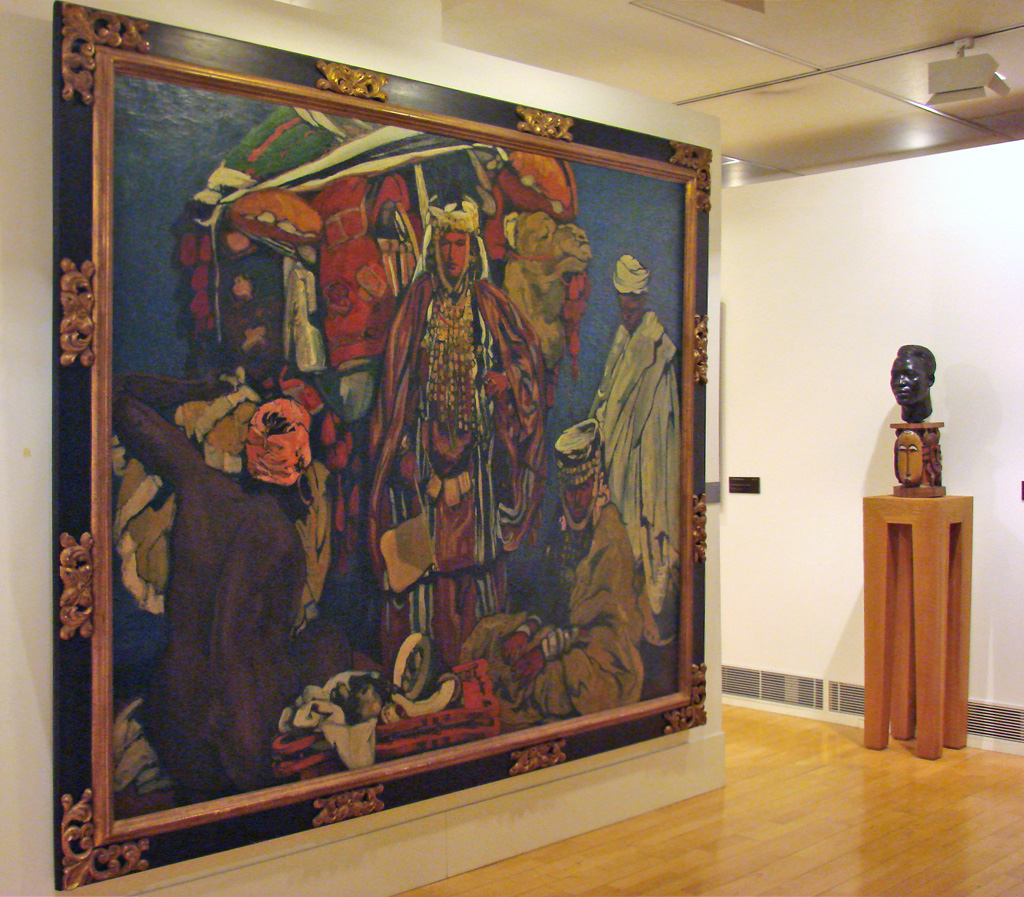
Painting of the Ouled Naïls by Léon Cauvy (Musée des Années Trente)

The 1956 edition of the Michelin Guide devotes only a few lines to the Ouled Naïl mountain region; Djelfa is not even mentioned and the Ouled Naïl people are "mere courtesans and Oriental dancers". French colonialist representations of the Ouled Naïl concentrated almost exclusively on women who temporarily left their home and settled in some nearby town. However, none of the highland tribes to which they belonged were specialised in prostitution and only some Ouled Naïl women became dancers. A British traveller, Lawrence Morgan, gave an account of his experiences living with the Ouled Naïl which focuses on the lives of the dancers. Still, the exuberance of their ornaments and the exoticism of their costumes added to the general fascination.

Auguste Maure, an orientalist photographer that lived in Biskra was active from 1860 to 1907 and took many photographs of landscapes and cities of south Algeria (El Kantara, Sidi Okba, Chetma, Tilatou, Tolga, Touggourt). The female members of the Ouled Naïl tribe, wearing the traditional colorful costumes and covered by jewels, were often represented on Maure photographs which were appreciated by tourists.

In the 1930s, painter Juanita Guccione lived among the Ouled Naïl people, and she used the experience as inspiration for some of her work.

== Gallery ==
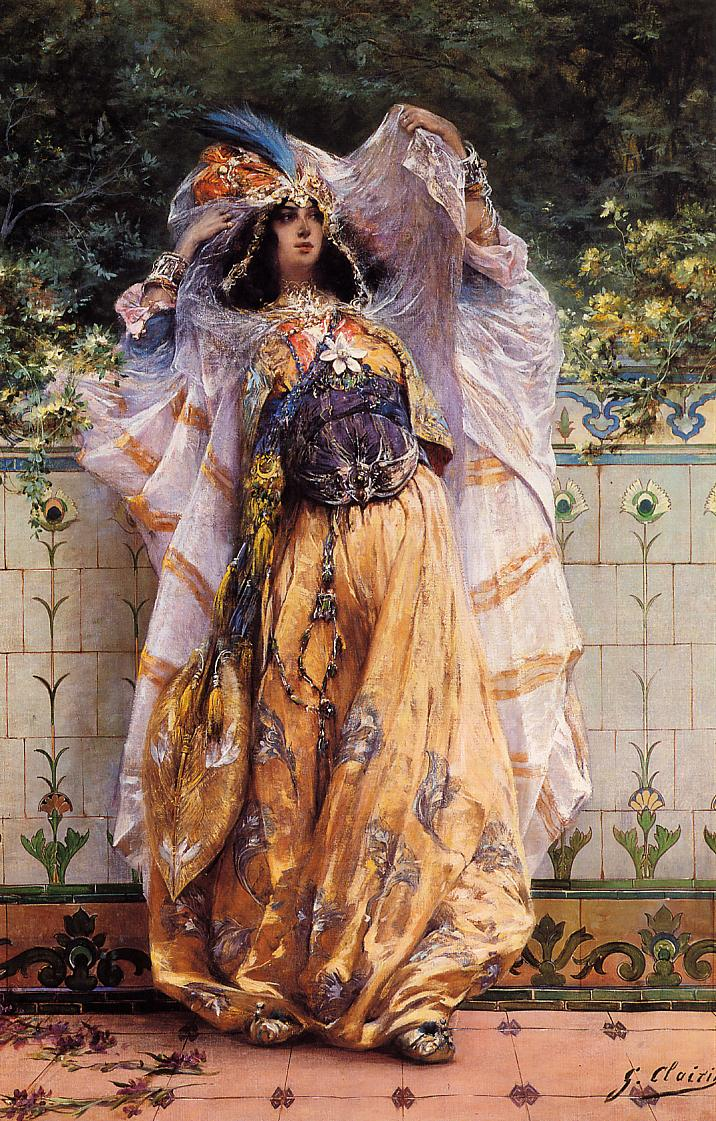
Ouled Naïl dancer in oriental paint by Georges Clairin

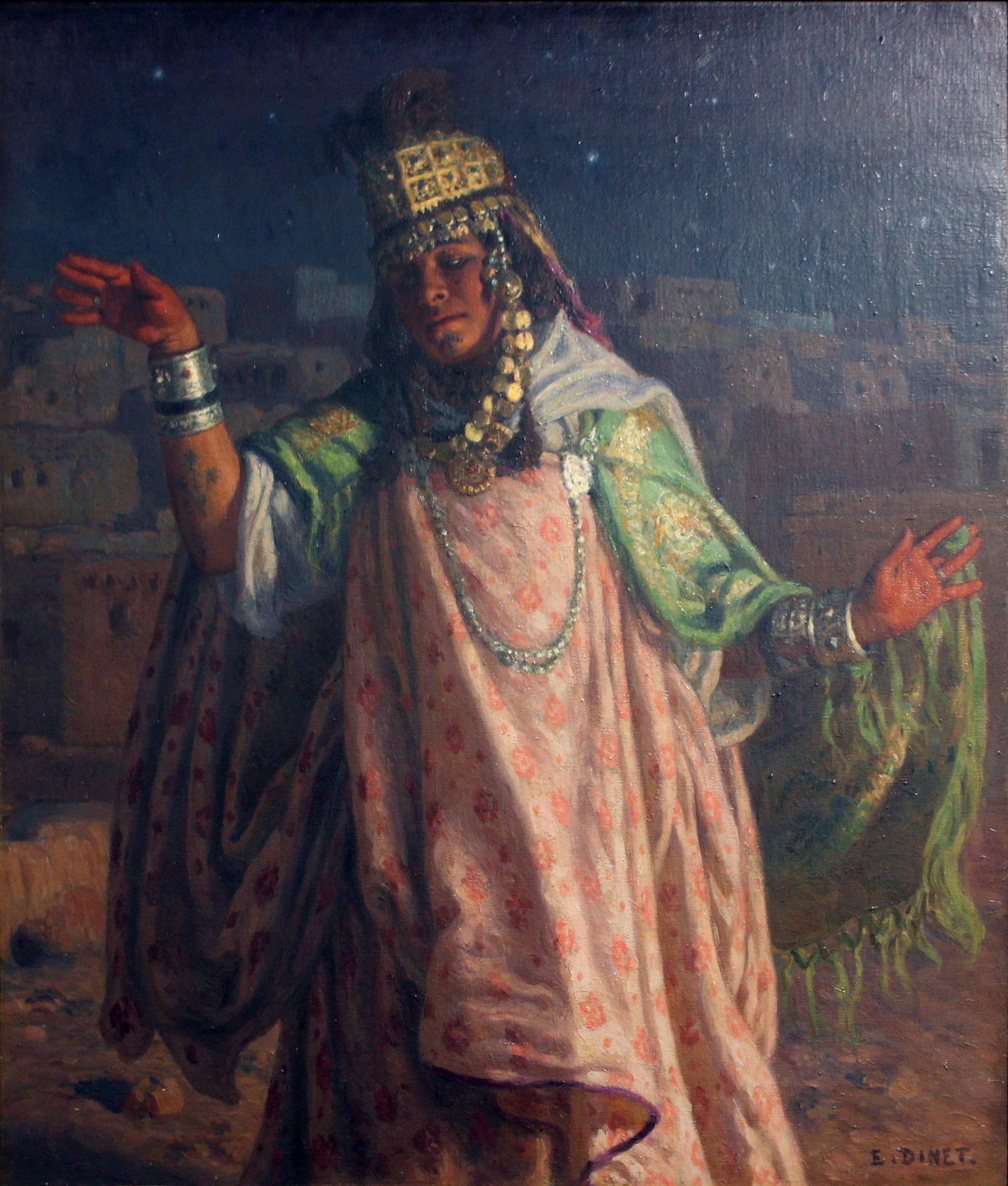
Ouled Naïl dancer in oriental paint

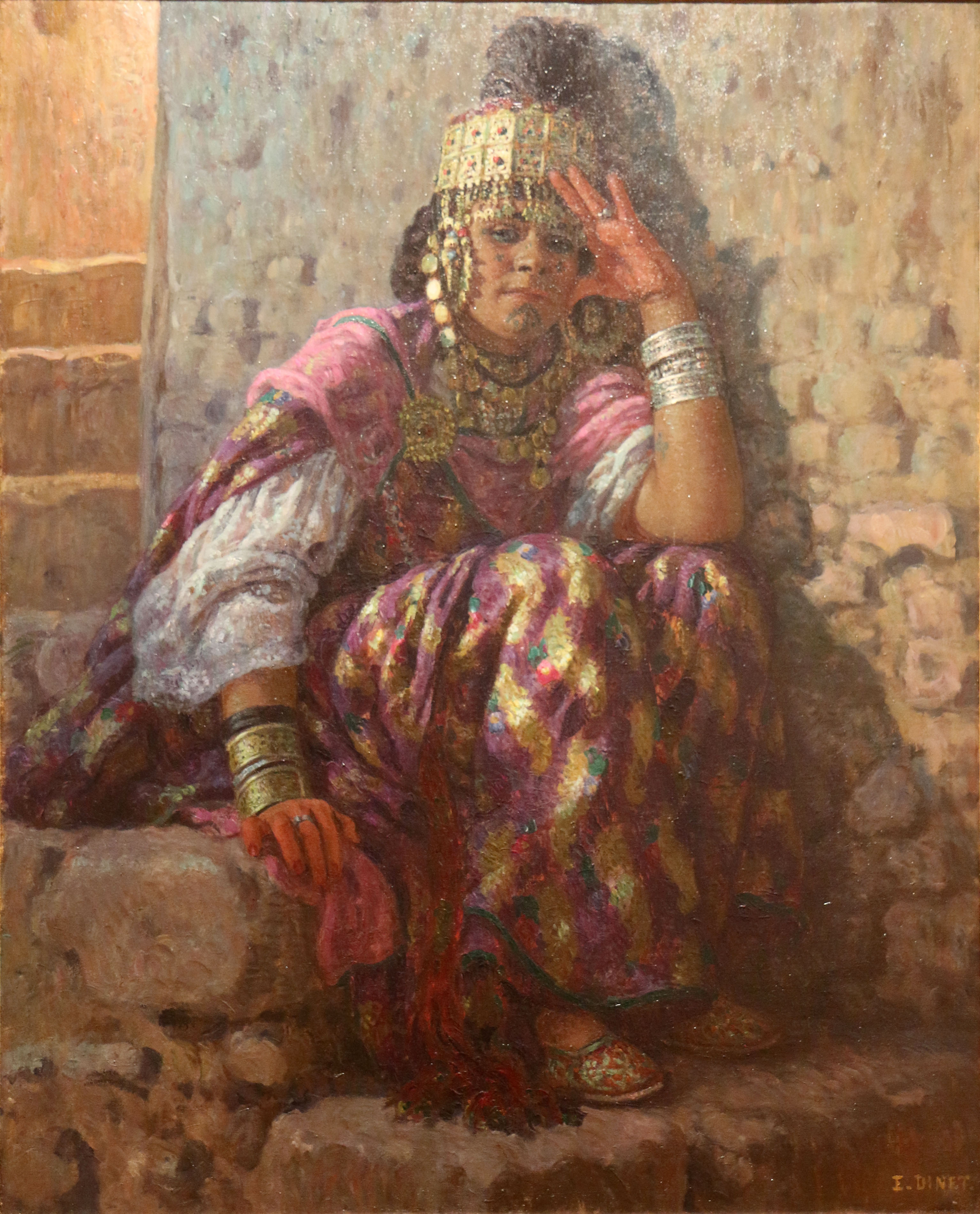
Ouled Naîl by Nasreddine Dinet

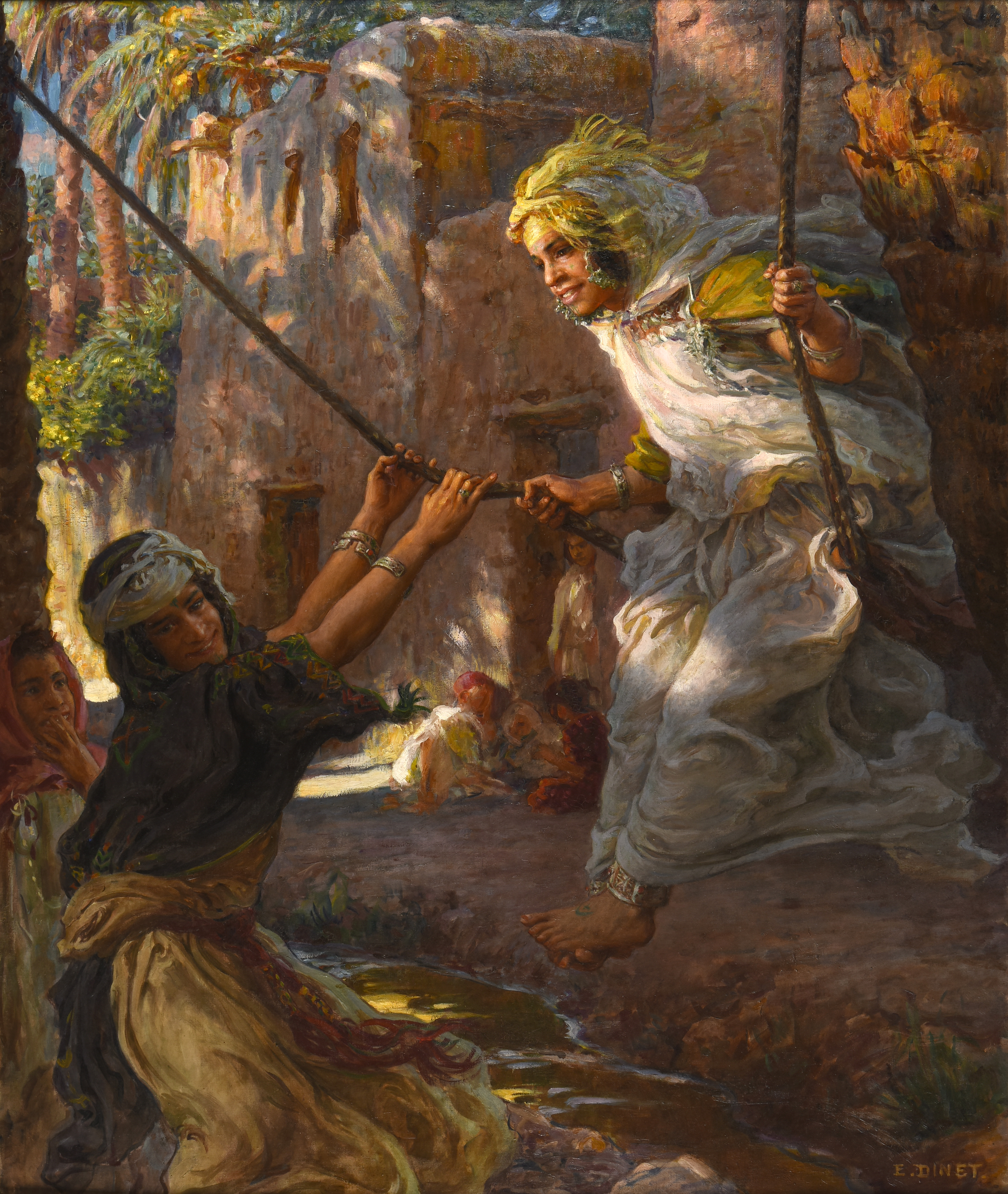
The Swing by Nasreddine Dinet

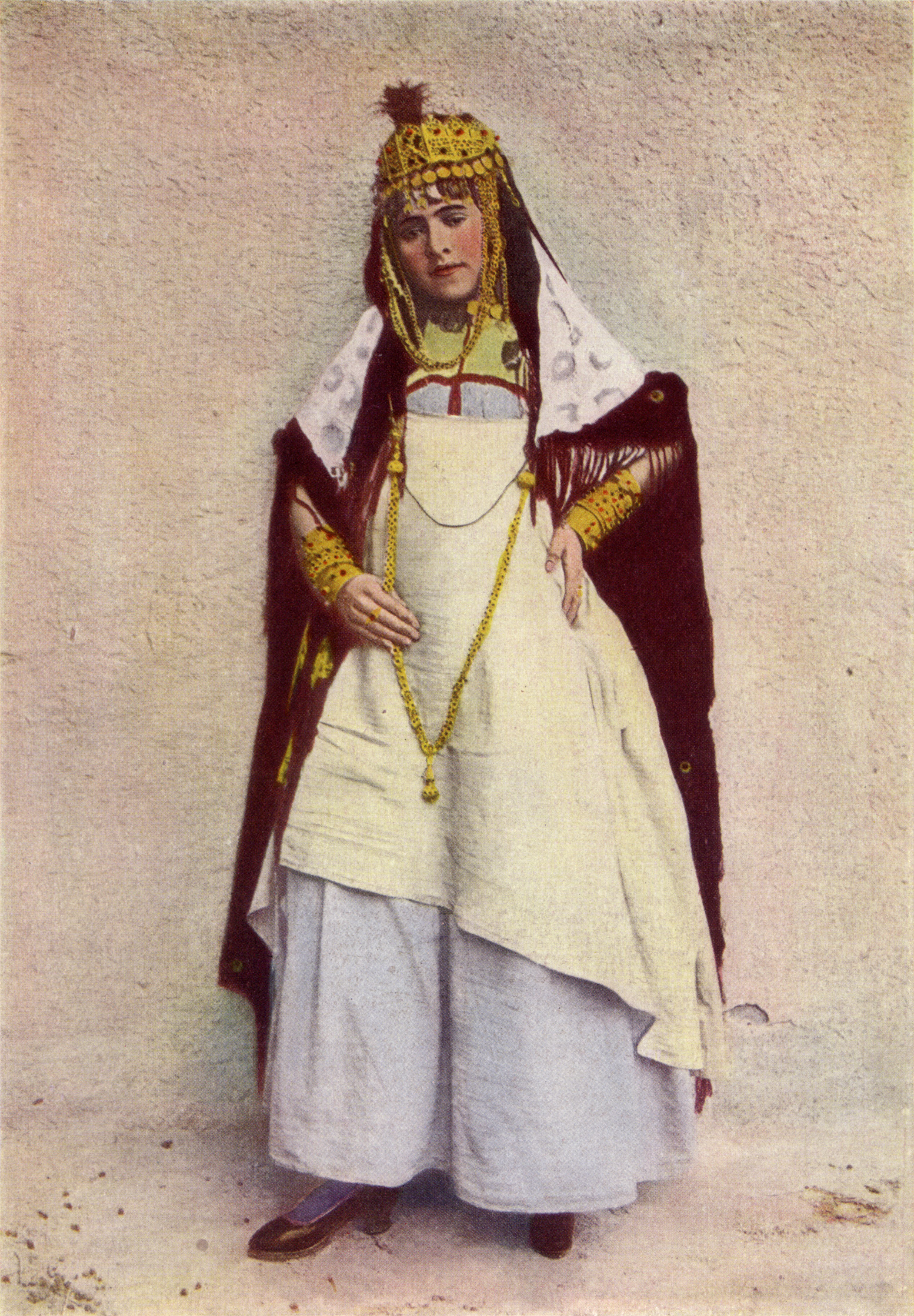
A Ouled Naïl dancer

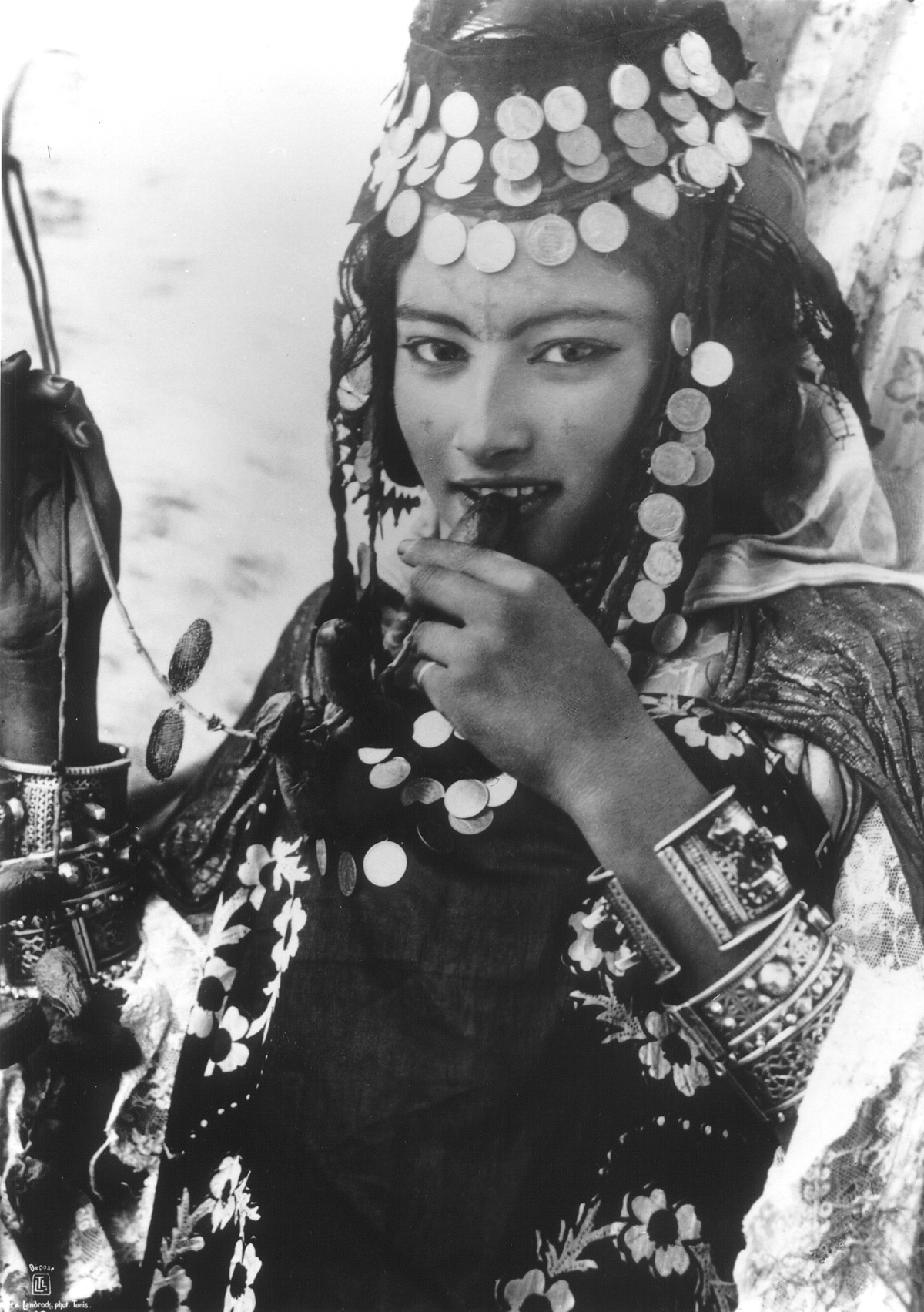
Ouled Naïl girl

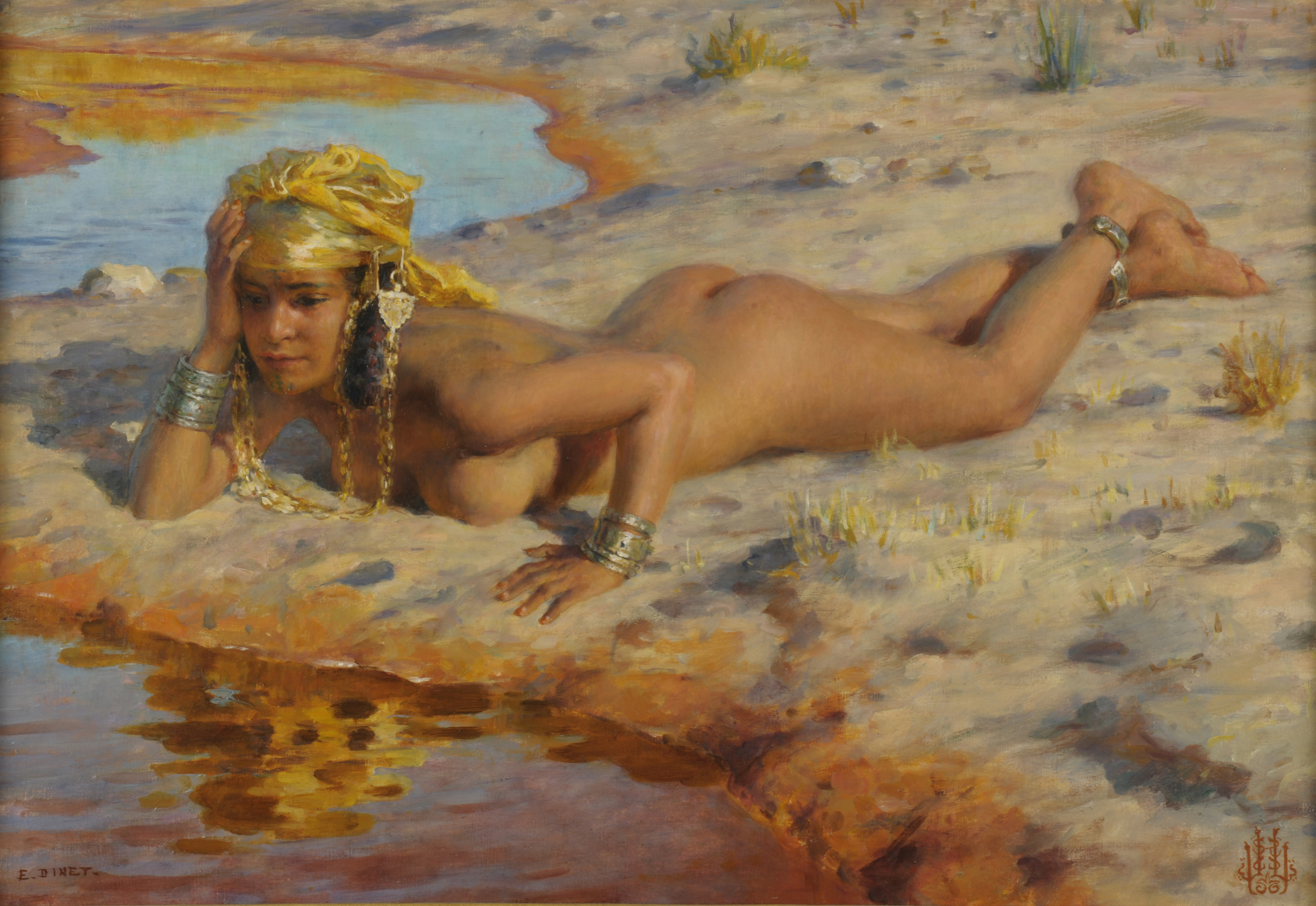
On the Banks of the Wadi by Nasreddine Dinet

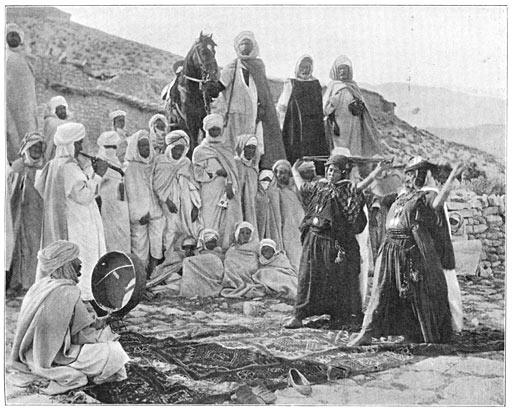
Ouled Naïl dancers and musicians

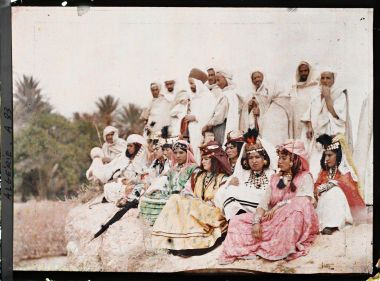
Ouled Naïl dancers and musicians

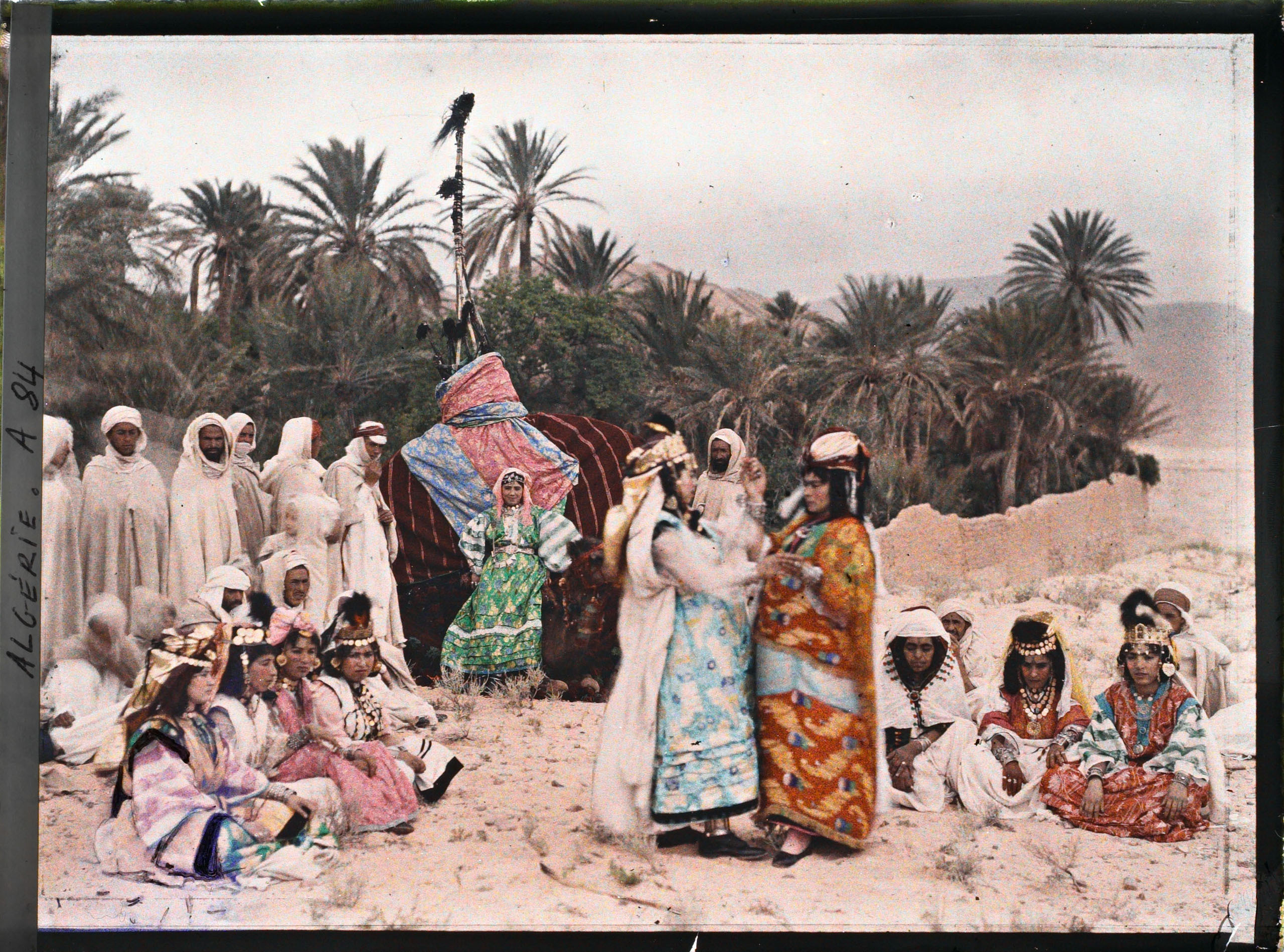
Ouled Naïl dancers and musicians

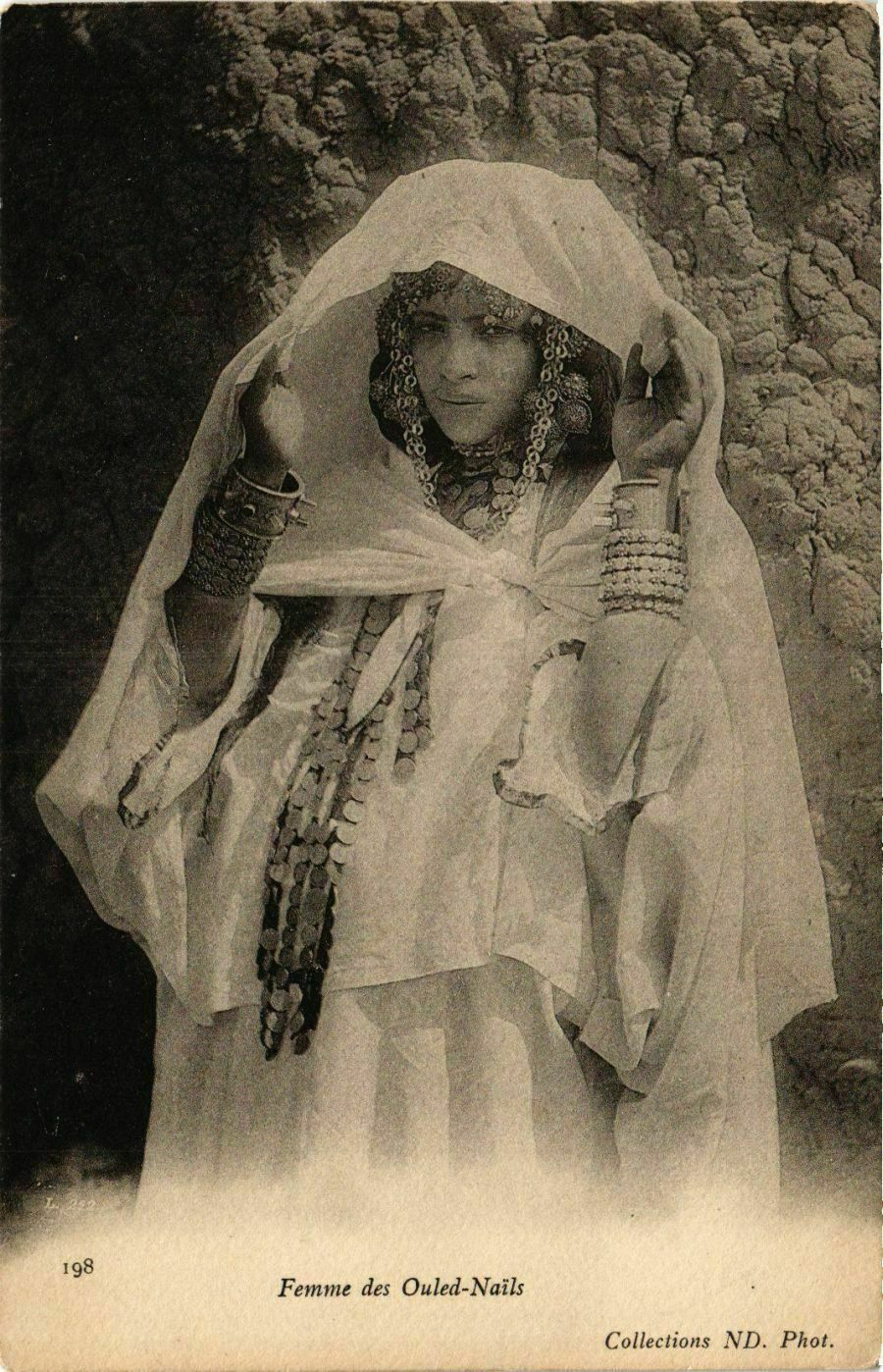
Ouled Naïl girl

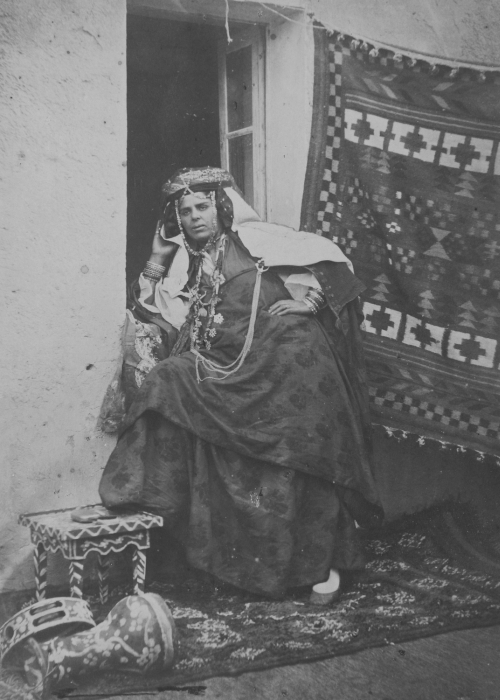
Ouled Naïl women

Ouled Naïl girl

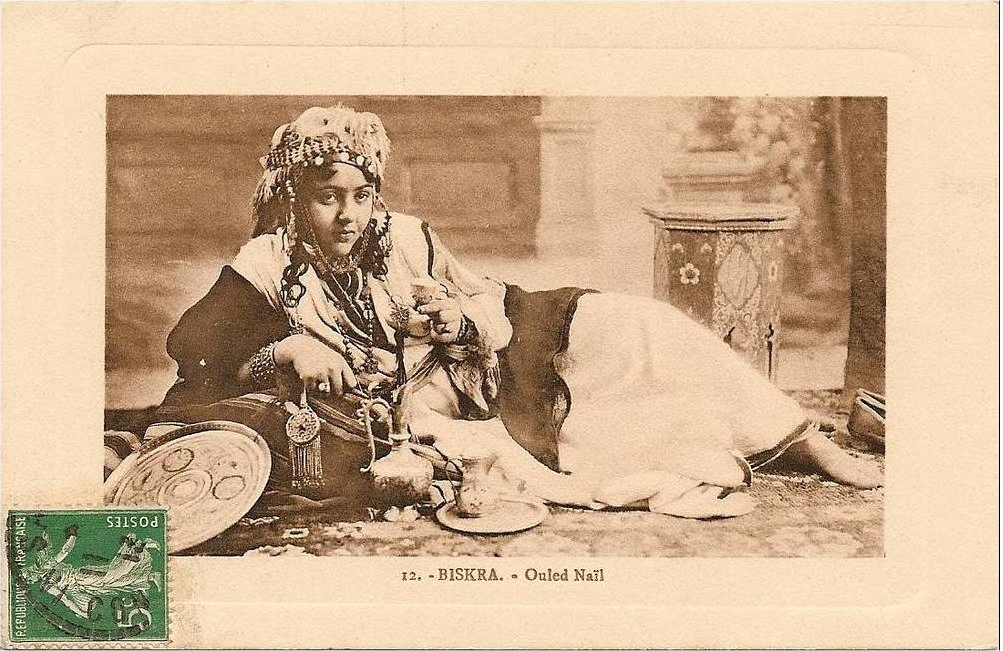
Ouled Naïl dancer

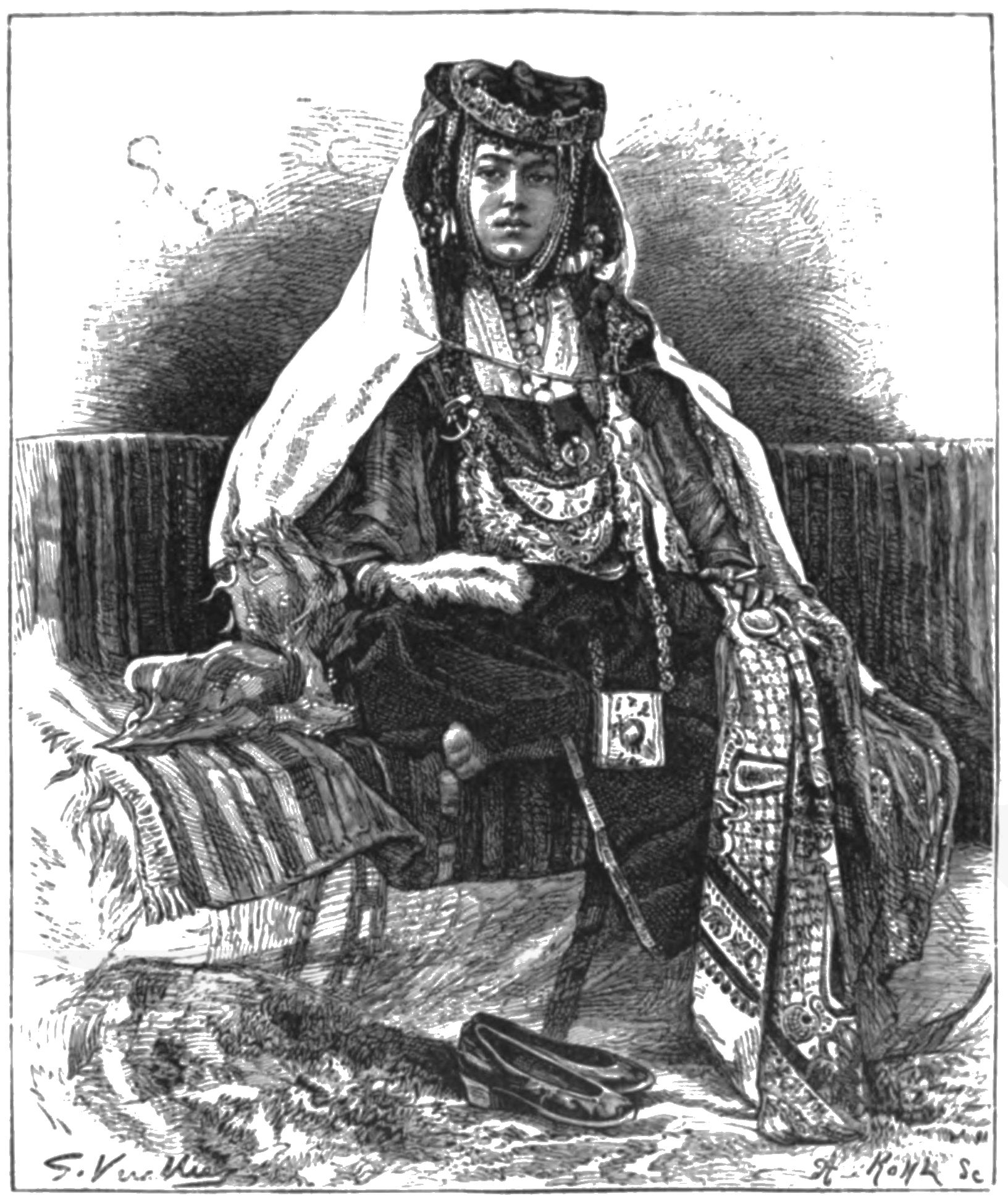
A Ouled Naïl women

== See also ==
- Bou Saâda
- Djelfa
- Auguste Maure
- Nasreddine Dinet
- The Finale of the orchestral Suite Beni Mora by Gustav Holst is titled In the Street of the Ouled Naïls.
