= Gobezayehu Getachew Yilma =

Ethiopian Roman Catholic prelate (born 1978)

- Apostolic Vicar of Awasa, Ethiopia
- Church: Roman Catholic Church
- Archdiocese: Immediately subject to the Holy See
- Appointed: 15 November 2024
- Predecessor: Father Juan González Núñez (Apostolic Administrator)
- Previous posts: Priest of Vicariate Apostolic of Meki, Ethiopia (2005–2024)

Orders
- Ordination: 16 January 2005
- Consecration: 9 February 2025
- Rank: Bishop

Personal details
- Born: Gobezayehu Getachew Yilma; December 4, 1978 (age 47) Dodola Village, Vicariate Apostolic of Harar, Ethiopia

Styles of Gobezayehu Getachew Yilma
- Reference style
- Religious style: Bishop

Gobezayehu Getachew Yilma (born 4 December 1978) is a Roman Catholic prelate in Ethiopia, who was appointed as the Apostolic Vicar of the Roman Catholic Vicariate of Awasa (Hawassa), Ethiopia on 15 November 2024, by Pope Francis. Prior to his appointment as Apostolic Vicar, Monsignor Gobezayehu Getachew Yilma served as a priest of the Apostolic Vicariate of Meki, Ethiopia.

== Early life and education ==
He was born on 4 December 1978, at Dodola Village in the Apostolic Vicariate of Harar, in the Oromia Region of Ethiopia.

He attended Jimma University of Agriculture and while there he studied agriculture. He then studied philosophy and theology at the Capuchin Franciscan Institute in Addis Ababa. He graduated with a diploma in philosophy and a Bachelor of Arts degree in theology from the Pontifical Urbaniana University in Rome.

Later, he obtained a Master's Degree in Development Studies from the Kimmage Development Studies Centre in Dublin, Ireland, followed by a Doctor of Theology degree with specialization in Catholic Social Teaching at St Patrick's Pontifical University, Maynooth, between 2009 and 2015.

== Priesthood ==
He was ordained a priest on 16 January 2005 at Meki Parish, by Bishop Abraham Desta, the Vicar Apostolic of Meki, Ethiopia. He served as a priest of the Vicariate of Meki. Over the years, he has served in various roles in the Catholic Church, including as:

- Secretary of the Apostolic Vicar of Meki
- Youth Coordinator of the Apostolic Vicariate of Meki
- Deputy Secretary General of the Catholic Secretariat of Meki
- Secretary General of the Catholic Secretariat of Meki
- Vicar Delegate of the Apostolic Vicariate of Meki
- Executive Director of Diocesan Caritas, Meki Catholic Secretariat.

== As bishop ==
On 15 November 2021 Pope Francis appointed Monsignor Gobezayehu Getachew Yilma as Apostolic Vicar of the Apostolic Vicariate of Awasa. He replaced Father Juan Antonio González Núñez, a Comboni Missionary and native of Spain, who has been the Apostolic Administrator for the Vicariate between 2020 and 2024 and who turned 80 years old on 13 October 2024.

He was installed as Vicar Apostolic of the Apostolic Vicariate of Awasa, Ethiopia on 9 February 2025 by the hands of Berhaneyesus Demerew Cardinal Souraphiel, Archbishop of Addis Abeba (Ethiopian) assisted by Bishop Abraham Desta, Titular Bishop of Horrea Aninici and Bishop Tesfaye Tadesse Gebresilasie, Titular Bishop of Cleopatris.

== See also ==
- Roman Catholicism in Ethiopia

== Succession table ==
Catholic Church titles
Preceded by Juan González Núñez (Apostolic Administrator) (2020–2024)	Apostolic Vicar of Apostolic Vicariate of Awasa since 15 November 2024	Succeeded by Incumbent
