= Ouled Naïl Range =

Mountain range in Algeria

Wlād Nāyil Range سلسلة جبال ولاد نايل
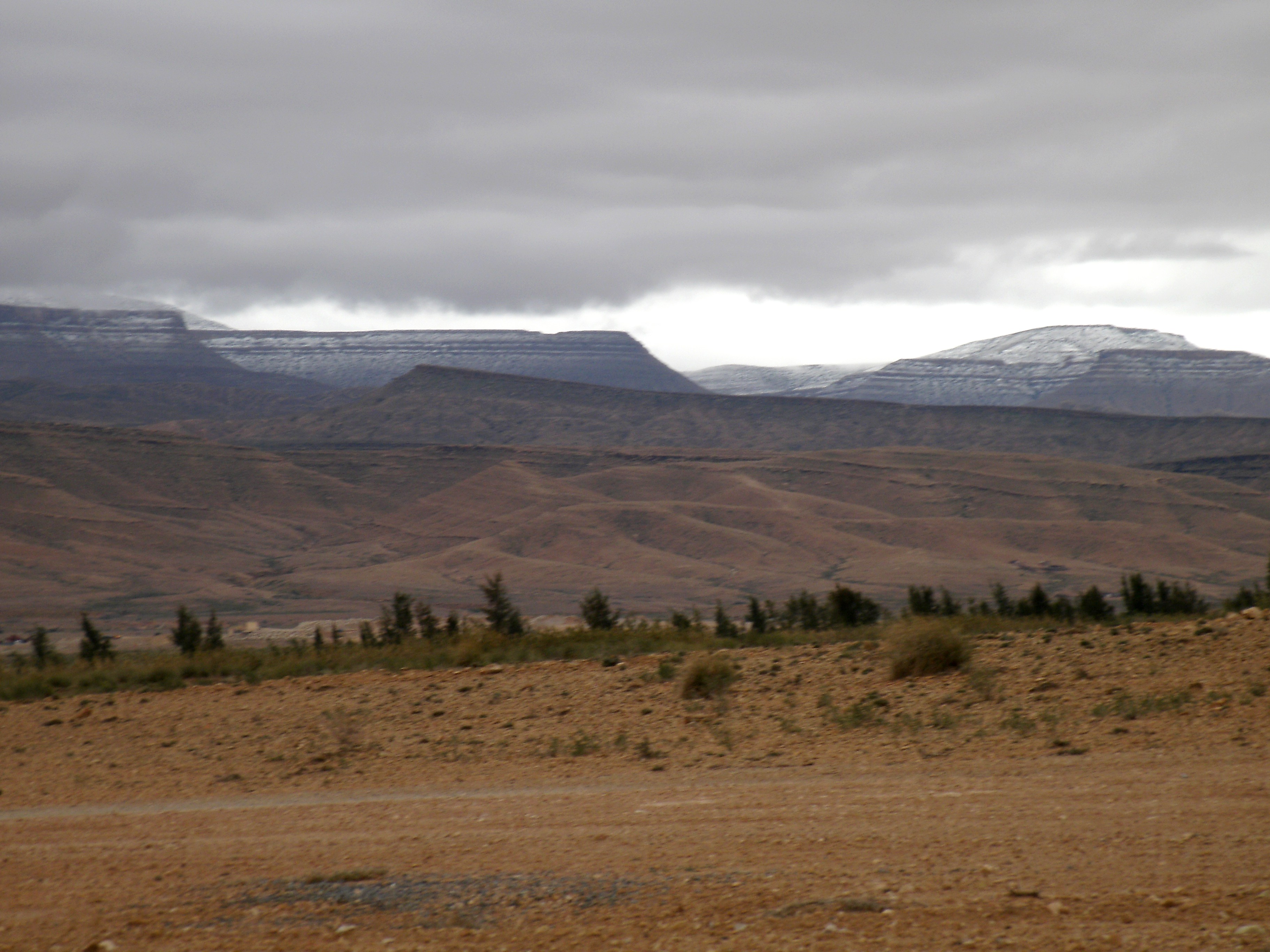
- Landscape of the range in the winter with the Djebel Selat near Bou Saada

Highest point
- Peak: Djebel Lazrag
- Elevation: 1,491 m (4,892 ft)
- Coordinates: 34°40′0″N 3°24′0″E

Dimensions
- Length: 180 km (110 mi) ENE/WSW
- Width: 70 km (43 mi) NNW/SSE

Geography
- Location within Algeria
- Country: Algeria
- Provinces: M'Sila, Djelfa and Laghouat
- Parent range: Saharan Atlas

Geology
- Orogeny: Alpine orogeny
- Rock age: Paleogene

The Wlād Nāyil Range (Arabic: سلسلة جبال ولاد نايل) is a mountain range in Algeria, part of the Saharan Atlas of the greater Atlas Mountain System. The range was named after a confederation of semi-nomadic tribes, which descended from Semitic Middle Eastern ancestors who arrived with the Arab migrations following the Islamic conquests.

== Geography ==
The Ouled Naïl mountain range is formed by parallel ridges rising between the level 850 m high terrain of the Hodna region of the Hautes Plaines in the north and the 600 m of the southern plain of the Dayas. It is located in the eastern zone of the Saharan Atlas, with the Amour Range in the western and the Zab Range at the eastern end.

The range is formed by mountains created by folds of the early Tertiary which remained relatively undisturbed after formation but have been heavily eroded. Their altitude is relatively moderate, the highest point of the range, Djebel Lazrag (جبل الأزرق), not even reaching 1,500 m. However, towards the south the look of the highest ridges is quite spectacular, with jagged sandstone or limestone outcrops and almost vertical walls. The part facing the Sahara has a less encumbered terrain with smooth mountaintops separated by water gaps.

The climate is dry in all the surrounding areas, but the rainfall is slightly better on the mountains. Therefore, cereal cultivation is possible in the heights, although with rather irregular results. Date palms are mostly absent throughout the range owing to the prevailing cold temperatures. They only grow in the few places at the feet of the Ouled Naïl mountains that are at an altitude below 600 m, such as near Bou Saada and the Oued Djedi.

== Human presence ==
Two important towns are located in the immediate area of the range, Bou-Saada to the north at the feet of the mountains and Djelfa in the middle of the range at an elevation of 1,208 m. North of Djelfa town there is an imposing physical feature known as Rocher de Sel (English: Salt Rock) that was formed from the erosion of rock salts and marls by rain.

To the west of the town Megalithic funerary structures are found. Neolithic art is widespread in different caves and walls throughout the range.

The range is well known for the Ouled Naïl people living in its cold highlands. Djelfa is an important market centre for the Ouled Naïl who live in black-and-red striped tents and claim ancient Arab descent. These semi-nomadic or nomadic people have traditionally reared cattle in the mountain grasslands. The years of drought and years with prolonged, cold winters are hard times for the Ouled Nail; in 1944 and 1947 about 50% of their livestock died.

== Features ==
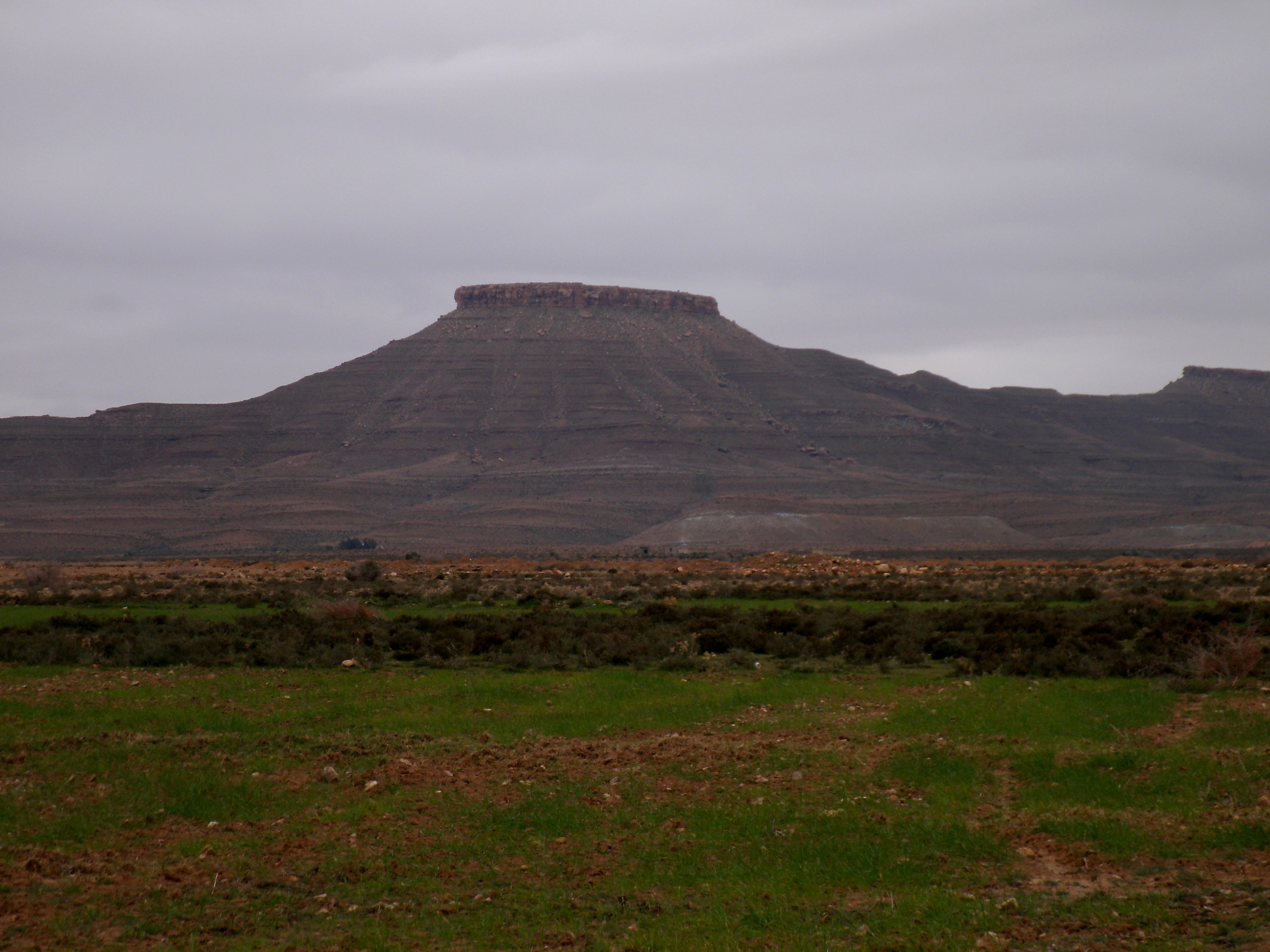
A flat-topped hill near Bou-Saada.

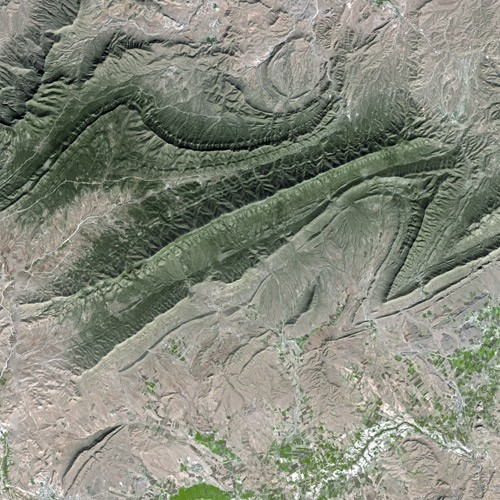
Satellite image of the eastern end of the range south of Bou Saâda.

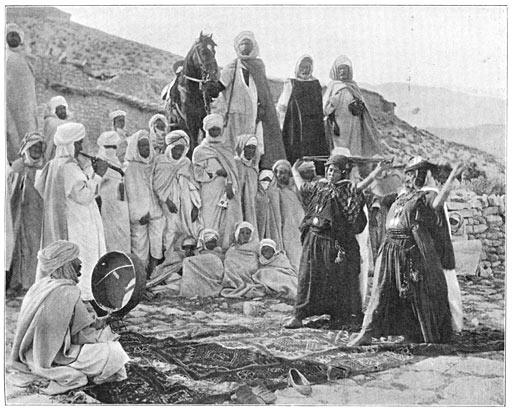
Ouled Nail people dancing.

== See also ==
- List of mountains in Algeria
- Ouled Naïl
- Saharan Atlas
