= Ouled Naîl =

Painting by Nasreddine Dinet

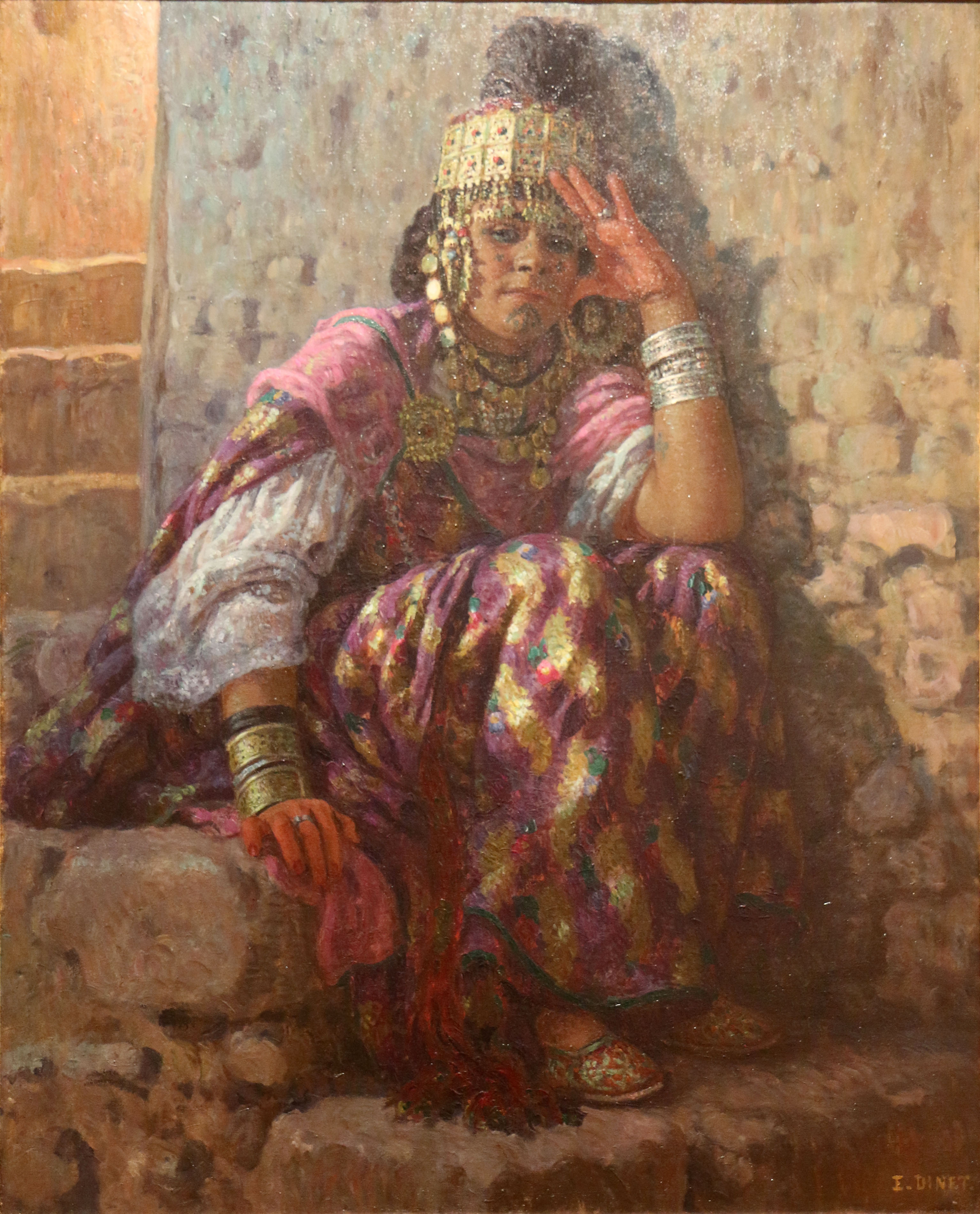
- Artist: Nasreddine Dinet
- Year: before 1921
- Medium: Oil-on-canvas
- Dimensions: 100,5 cm × 81,2 cm (396 in × 320 in)
- Location: Musée d'Orsay, Paris

Ouled Naîl is a genre painting created before 1921, by the French artist Nasreddine Dinet.

== Description ==
Ouled Naîl is an oil painting by Nasreddine Dinet, created before 1921. This is a portrait of a woman from the Ouled Naïl tribe in her traditional costume.

The painting was purchased by the French Third Republic in 1921, which then attributes it to the Musée du Luxembourg. In 1981, it was assigned to the Musée d'Orsay. Finally, in 2019, it was placed on deposit at the Toulon Art Museum.

In 2024, the painting is being presented among the works in the exhibition Nasreddine Dinet, Algerian Passions at the Institut du monde arabe.

== See also ==
- Orientalism
