= Rocher de Sel =

Coordinates: 34.835°N 3.093°E

Rocher de Sel ("Salt Rock"), known in Arabic as Khanguet-el-Melah ("Parade of Salt"), is a large geological formation in the Ouled Naïl Range, near the town of Djelfa. Rocher de Sel is composed of a mixture of salt and clay, and is nearly 1,500 m (4,900 ft) in diameter and 105 m (344 ft) tall. Due to its composition, Rocher de Sel is distinctly whitish-gray, and entirely barren of plant life.

Rocher de Sel was formed when the Earth's crust folded upwards, pushing a previously buried layer of salt and clay upwards in a bulge. Later precipitation would erode the surface into its current scarred and furrowed state. It is unknown why the formation has not eroded completely, despite the susceptibility of its materials. It has been suggested that the clay repels the area's light rainfall before it can do much damage, or that the water becomes so saturated by salt that it quickly becomes unable to dissolve any more. Another theory states that the formation is still bulging upwards at a rate that almost matches the erosion.
