= Giovanni Migliorati (bishop) =

Italian Roman Catholic bishop and theologian (1942–2016)

Giovanni Migliorati MCCJ
- Vicar Apostolic of Awasa
- Church: Catholic Church
- See: Apostolic Vicariate of Awasa
- In office: 21 March 2009 – 12 May 2016
- Predecessor: Lorenzo Ceresoli
- Successor: Roberto Bergamaschi
- Other post: Titular Bishop of Ambia (2009-2016)

Orders
- Ordination: 12 April 1969 by Luigi Morstabilini
- Consecration: 31 May 2009 by Berhaneyesus Demerew Souraphiel

Personal details
- Born: 24 August 1942 Pavone del Mella, Province of Brescia, Kingdom of Italy
- Died: 12 May 2016 (aged 73) Brescia, Lombardy, Italy

Giovanni Migliorati (24 August 1942 – 12 May 2016) was a Roman Catholic bishop.

Ordained to the priesthood in 1969, Migliorati served as Vicar Apostolic of Awasa, Ethiopia from 2009 until his death in 2016. Migliorati was born in Italy.
