= Lorenzo Ceresoli =

Italian Catholic bishop (1931–2024)

His Excellency Lorenzo Ceresoli
- Apostolic Vicar Emeritus of Awasa
- Appointed: 20 December 1993
- Term ended: 21 March 2009
- Predecessor: Armido Gasparini
- Successor: Giovanni Migliorati
- Other post: Titular Bishop of Fallaba (1993–2024)

Orders
- Ordination: 2 April 1960
- Consecration: 19 March 1994 by Jozef Tomko

Personal details
- Born: 18 May 1931 Nave, Italy
- Died: 6 September 2024 (aged 93) Castel d'Azzano, Italy

Lorenzo Ceresoli (18 May 1931 – 6 September 2024) was an Italian Roman Catholic prelate, priest, and member of the Comboni Missionaries of the Heart of Jesus (M.C.C.J.). Ceresoli served as the vicar apostolic of the Apostolic Vicariate of Awasa in Ethiopia from 1993 until his retirement in 2000. He was also appointed the Titular Bishop of Fallaba from 1993 until his death in 2024.

Ceresoli was born in Nave, Lombardy, Italy, on 18 May 1931. He died in Castel d'Azzano, Italy on 6 September 2024, at the age of 93.

Catholic Church titles
Preceded by Armido Gasparini	Apostolic Vicar of Awasa; 1993–2009	Succeeded by Giovanni Migliorati
Preceded by J. Terry Steib	Titular Bishop of Fallaba; 1993–2024	Succeeded by Vacant
