= Nave, Lombardy =

Nave Nàe
- Comune
- Comune di Nave
- Location within Italy Location within Lombardy
- Coordinates: 45°35′06″N 10°17′0″E
- Country: Italy
- Region: Lombardy
- Province: Brescia (BS)
- Frazioni: Cortine, Dernago, Mitria, Monteclana, Muratello, Sacca, San Cesario, San Rocco

Area
  - Total: 27 km^{2} (10 sq mi)
- Elevation: 236 m (774 ft)

Population (2011)
  - Total: 11,126
  - Density: 410/km^{2} (1,100/sq mi)
- Demonym: Navensi
- Time zone: UTC+1 (CET)
  - Summer (DST): UTC+2 (CEST)
- Postal code: 25075
- Dialing code: 030
- ISTAT code: 017117
- Patron saint: San Costanzo
- Website: Official website

Nave (Brescian: Nàe) is a town and comune in the province of Brescia, in Lombardy, Italy. Neighbouring communes are, from the south and clockwise: Brescia, Bovezzo, Concesio, Lumezzane, Caino, Serle and Botticino. It is located in the Garza valley.

The origin of the name Nave is not certain. Some maintain it comes from nava (cfr. English navel) meaning the valley basin in which Nave sits, others think it is a contraction from Latin nam vallis, wide valley . Another possibility is it comes from Latin navis meaning ship (cfr. Italian nave with the same meaning) due to the overall shape of the town when seen from the Maddalena mountain. Notwithstanding this hypothesis being held as improbable, the coat of arms of the town sports a ship on it.

Originally Nave consisted in a series of loosely connected urban sections: Nave proper (Nave centro, Nàe), Campanile (Kampanìl), Cortine (Kurtìne), Dernago (Dernàk), Mitria (Mìtria), Monteclana (Monteklàna), Muratello (Möradêl) which eventually connected together following urbanization. This is reflected by the fact that Nave does not have a main square, which is uncommon for an Italian town. Nave is also known as the Iron valley due to the multiple iron and steel factories that characterised the environment.

In one of its urban section - Cortine - is still possible to visit "Villa Zanardelli", a former house of the President Giuseppe Zanardelli.

A Lombard language tongue twister plays on Nàe being both the name of the town and a past tense of the verb nà (English to go, Italian andare): en dè ke nàe a Nàe go 'nkontràt el prèt de Nàe, 'l ma dìt endò ke nàe me go dìt ke nàe Nàe, which can be translated as: I was going to Nave when I met the priest of Nave, he asked me where I was going and I told him I was going to Nave.
