= Agnosine =

- Comune
- Comune di Agnosine
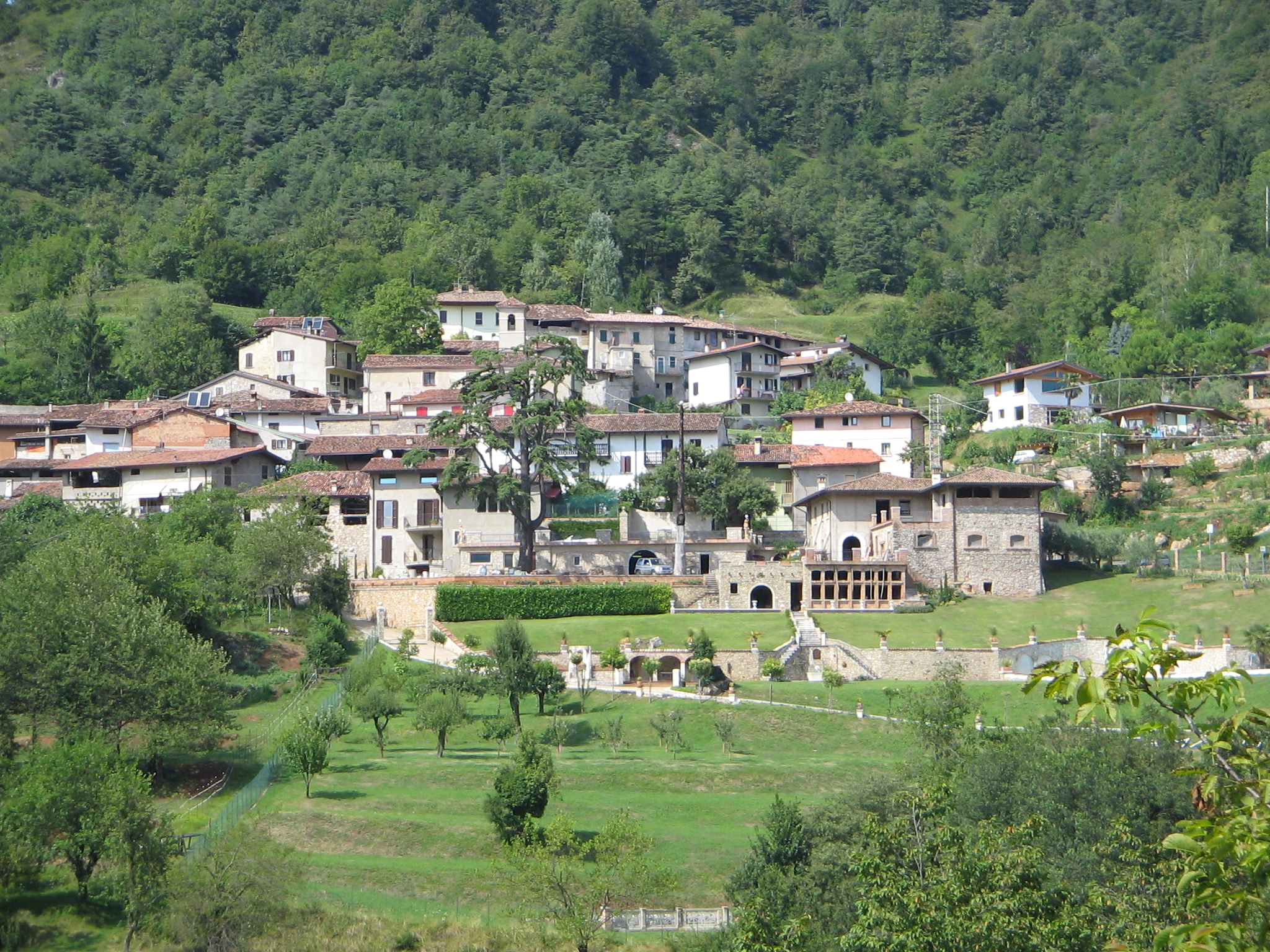
- View of Agnosine

- Location within Italy Location within Lombardy
- Coordinates: 45°39′N 10°21′E
- Country: Italy
- Region: Lombardy
- Province: Province of Brescia (BS)

Area
  - Total: 13 km^{2} (5.0 sq mi)
- Elevation: 465 m (1,526 ft)

Population (2011)
  - Total: 1,825
  - Density: 140/km^{2} (360/sq mi)
- Time zone: UTC+1 (CET)
  - Summer (DST): UTC+2 (CEST)
- Postal code: 25071
- Dialing code: 0365
- Website: Official website

Agnosine (Brescian: Gnùsen) is a comune in the province of Brescia, Lombardy, Italy. Is a town of 1,825 inhabitants (2011).
