= Djelfa =

Djelfa الجلفة
- City
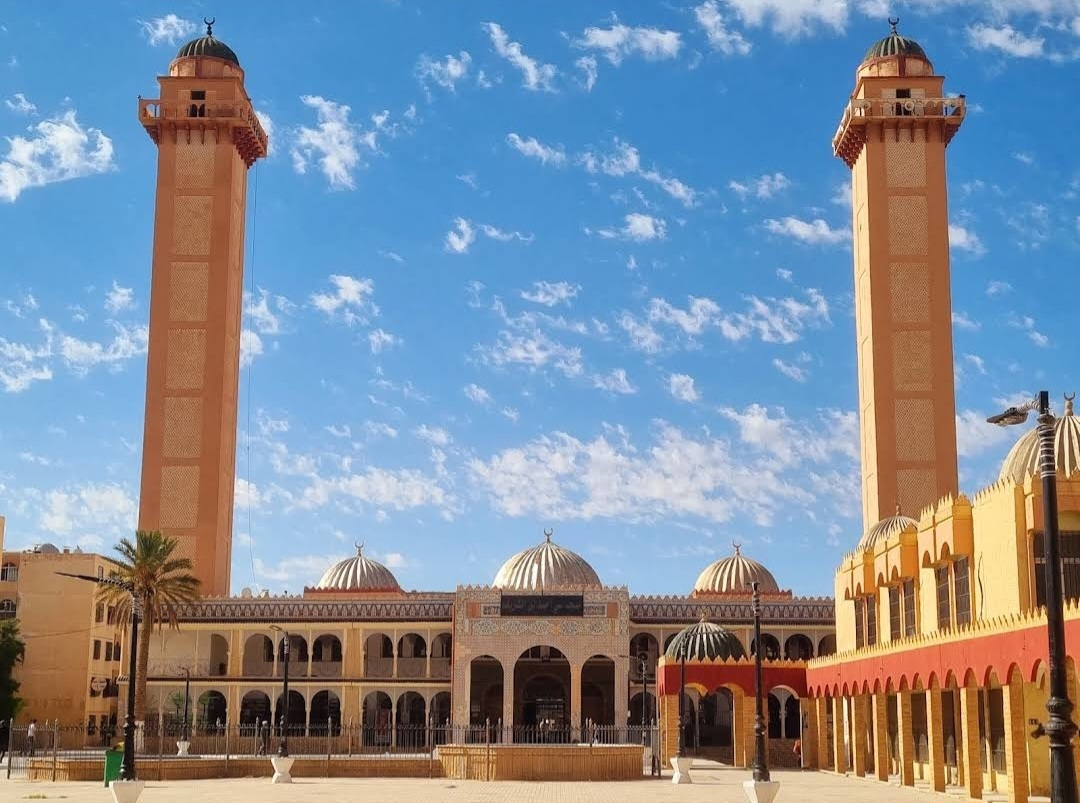
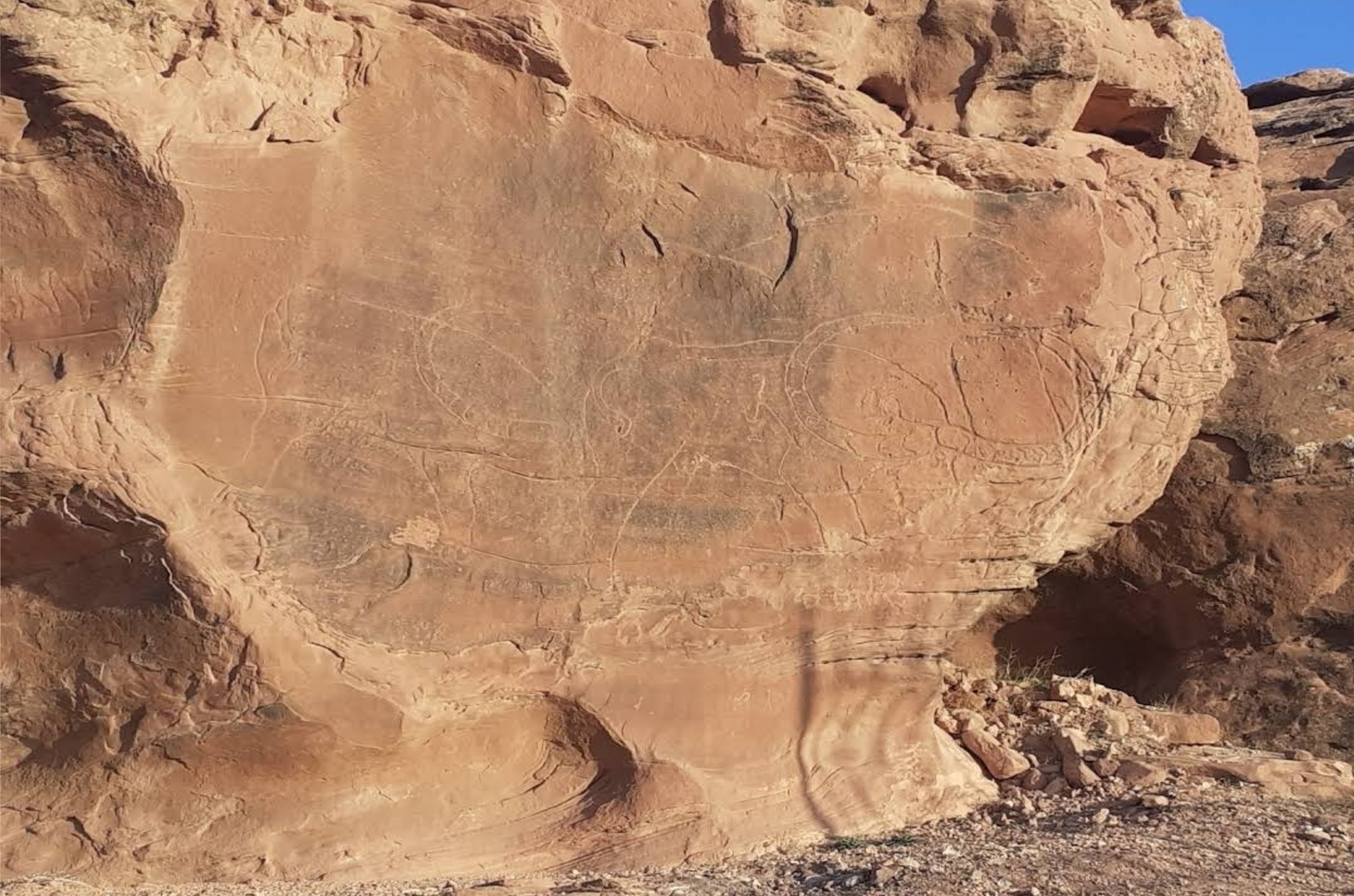
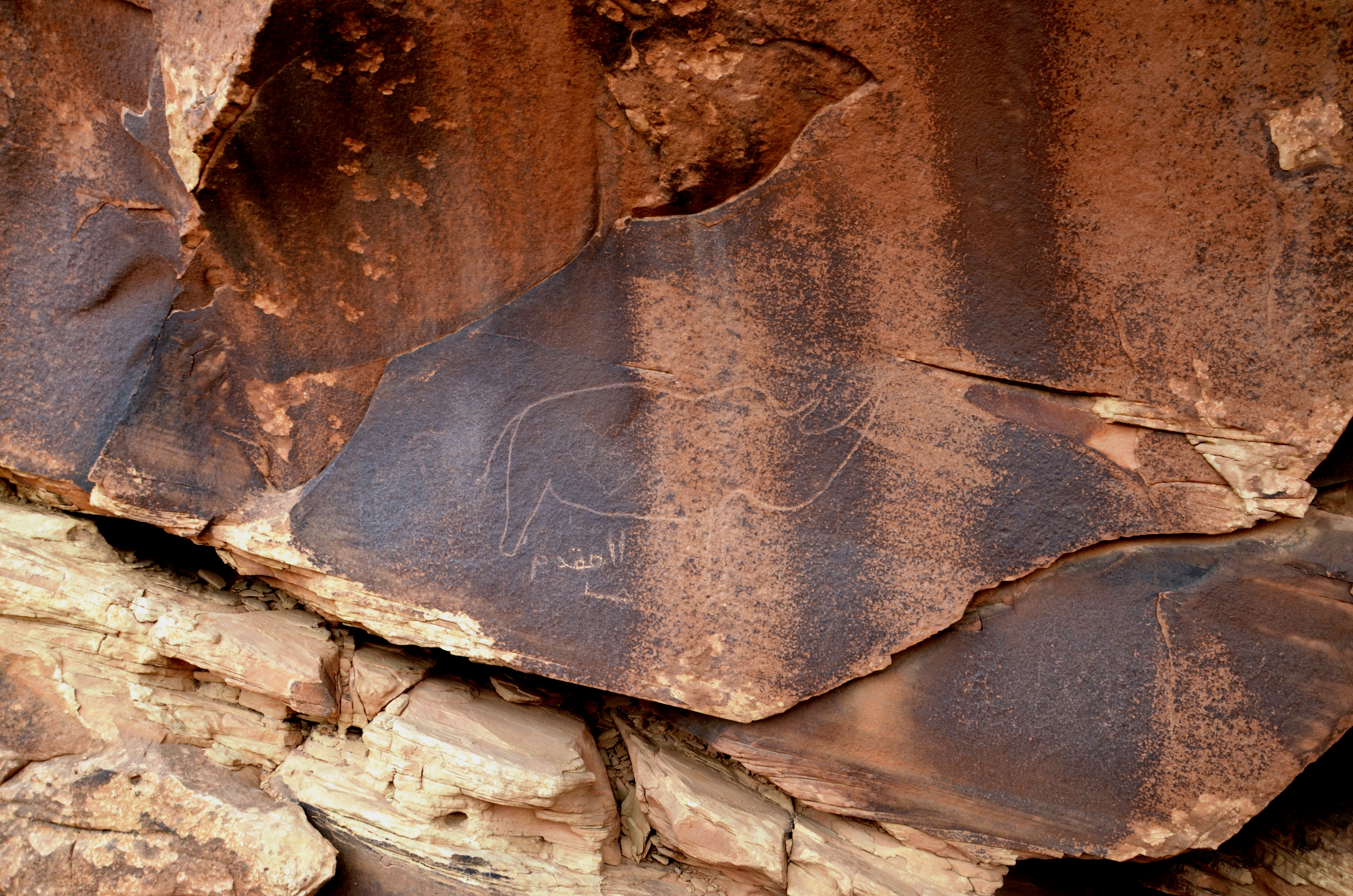
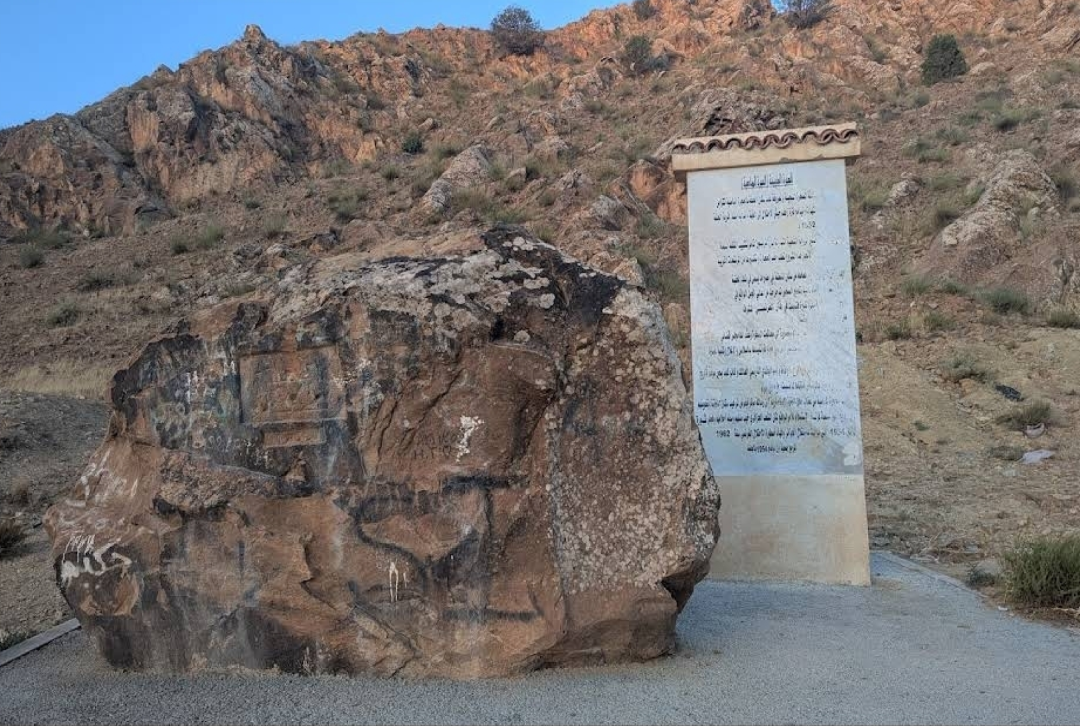
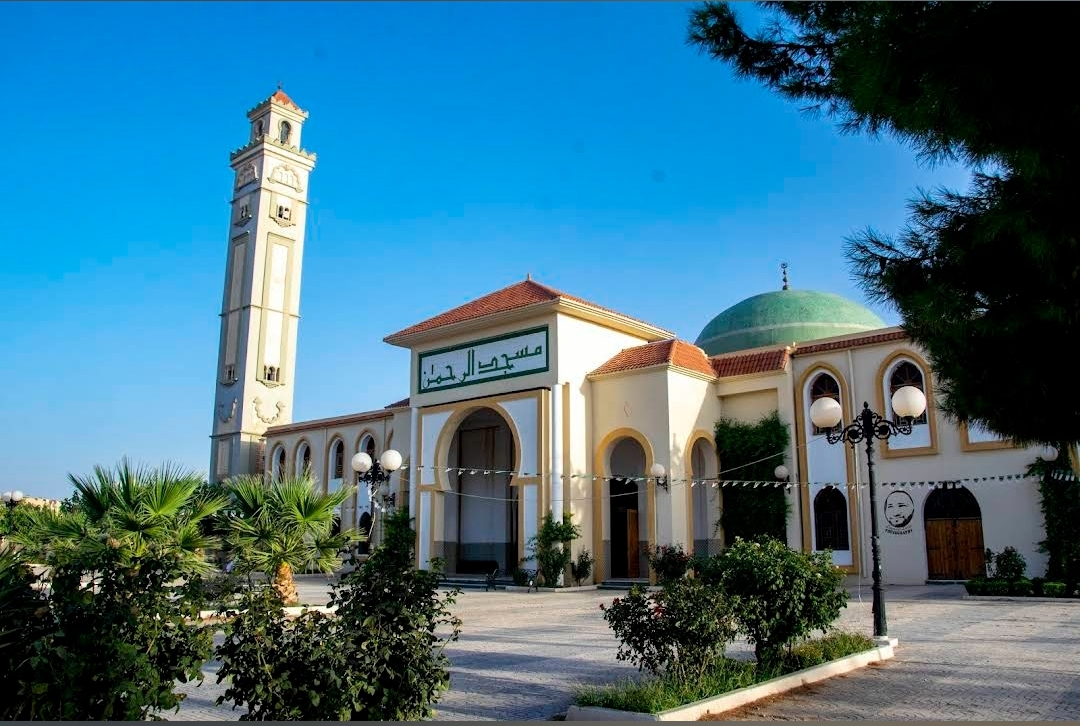
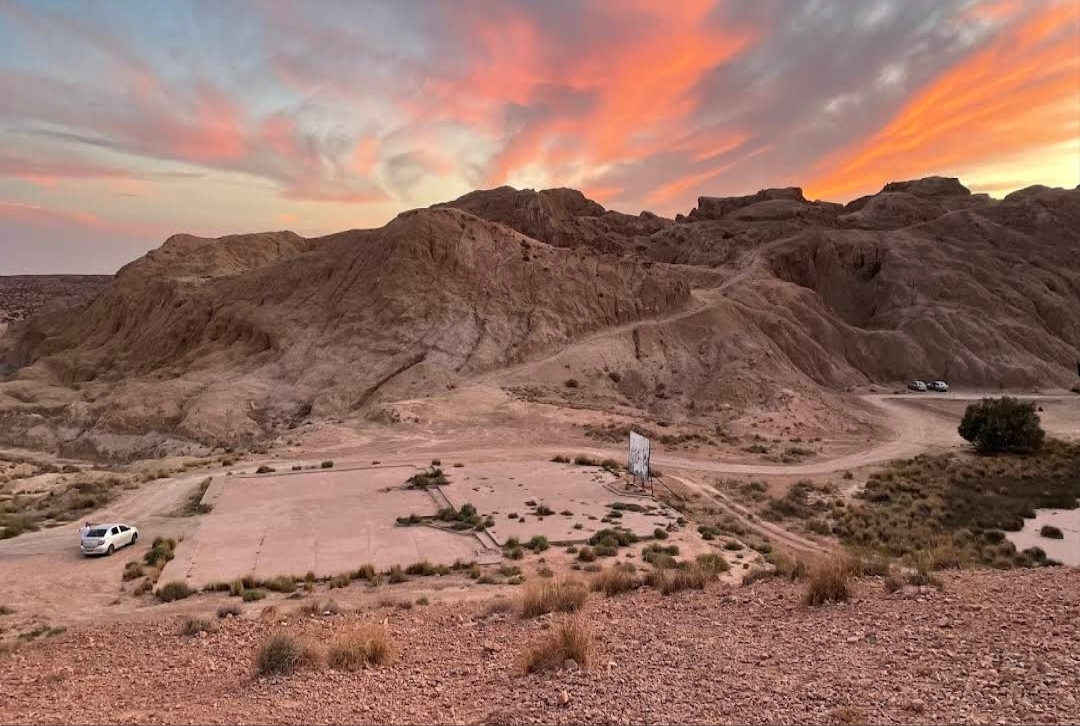
- Ben Cherif Mosque Moudjabera Rock Engravings Zaccar Rock Engravings Al Musabiyah Rock Al-Rahman Mosque Ain Maabad Salt Rock

- Location in Algeria
- Coordinates: 34°40′N 3°15′E
- Country: Algeria
- Province: Djelfa Province
- District: Djelfa District

Area
  - Total: 542.17 km^{2} (209.33 sq mi)
- Elevation: 1,110 m (3,640 ft)

Population (2024)
  - Total: 590,000
  - Density: 1,100/km^{2} (2,800/sq mi)

GDP (PPP, constant 2015 values)
  - Year: 2024
  - Total (Metro): $10.9 billion
  - Per capita: $18,600
- Time zone: UTC+1 (CET)
- Postal code: 170xx
- Area code: +213 27
- Climate: BSk

Djelfa (Arabic: الجلفة, romanized: al-Ǧilfah) is the capital city of Djelfa Province, Algeria and the site of ancient city and former bishopric Fallaba, which remains a Latin catholic titular see.

It has a population of 520,622 (2019 census). The city lies at the junction of the N1 and the N46 roads.

== History ==
The area is notable for its abundance of Neolithic rock carvings dating from 7000 to 5000 BC. North of Djelfa town there is an imposing physical feature known as Rocher de Sel (English: Salt Rock) that resulted from the erosion of rock salts and marls by rain. To the west of the town Megalithic funerary structures are found.

During the Roman Empire, a Roman town called Fallaba was built on the site of Djelfa. That town lasted unto late antiquity.

In the 11th century, the Fatimids sent the Banu Hilal to the Tripolitania, Tunisia and Constantine areas against the Zirids. The town became an important trading post during the Hafsid era.

During Philippe Pétain's period, a concentration camp was placed in Djelfa.

== Geography ==
Djelfa is located at an elevation of 3,734 feet (1,138 m) in the Ouled Naïl Range of north-central Algeria, between the towns of Bousaada and Laghouat. It is situated in a transitional zone between the dry, steppe-like Hautes Plaines (high plateaus) of the north, characterized by chotts (intermittent salt lakes), and the Sahara to the south. The town was founded in 1852 as a French military post on a geometric plan. It serves as an important livestock market centre for the semi-nomadic Ouled Naïl confederation. Djelfa is on the 12,000 mile-long Africa Trail.

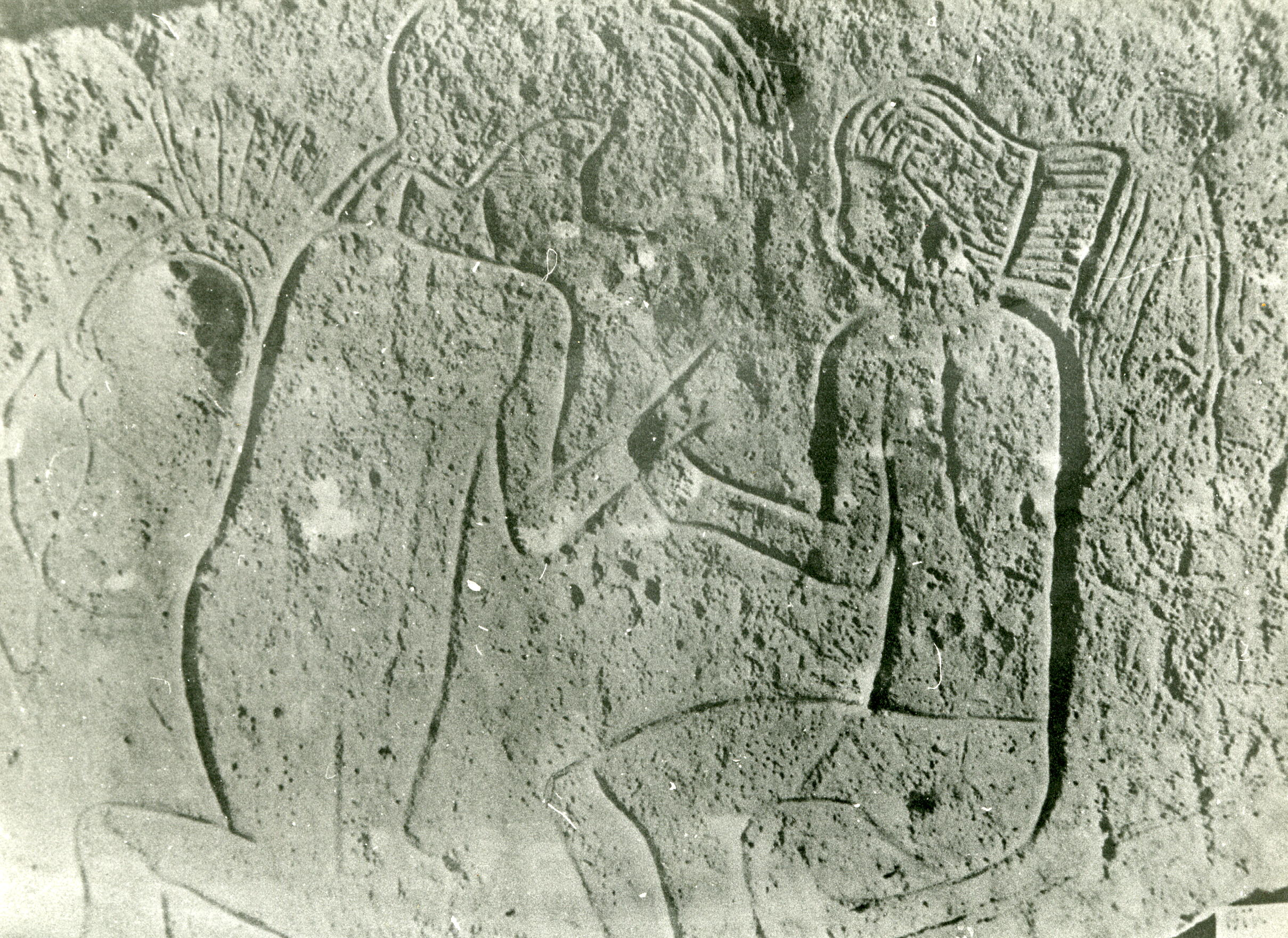
Neolithic art in Djelfa

The surrounding region for centuries has been the meeting place of the Ouled Naïl people, who live in black-and-red striped tents and claim descent from the Islamic prophet, Muhammad.

=== Climate ===
Djelfa has a semi-arid climate (Köppen climate classification BSk), with more precipitation in winter than in summer. Snow is not unusual in winter.

Climate data for Djelfa (1991-2020)
Month	Jan	Feb	Mar	Apr	May	Jun	Jul	Aug	Sep	Oct	Nov	Dec	Year
Record high °C (°F)	23.0 (73.4)	25.5 (77.9)	29.3 (84.7)	33.2 (91.8)	38.4 (101.1)	39.6 (103.3)	42.0 (107.6)	39.2 (102.6)	37.2 (99.0)	33.2 (91.8)	28.8 (83.8)	24.5 (76.1)	42.0 (107.6)
Mean daily maximum °C (°F)	9.8 (49.6)	12.0 (53.6)	15.1 (59.2)	18.3 (64.9)	23.5 (74.3)	29.9 (85.8)	33.8 (92.8)	32.9 (91.2)	27.5 (81.5)	21.1 (70.0)	14.4 (57.9)	10.8 (51.4)	20.8 (69.4)
Daily mean °C (°F)	5.2 (41.4)	6.2 (43.2)	9.4 (48.9)	12.6 (54.7)	17.5 (63.5)	22.8 (73.0)	26.8 (80.2)	26.0 (78.8)	21.0 (69.8)	15.7 (60.3)	9.6 (49.3)	6.2 (43.2)	14.9 (58.8)
Mean daily minimum °C (°F)	0.1 (32.2)	1.2 (34.2)	2.9 (37.2)	5.7 (42.3)	10.0 (50.0)	15.2 (59.4)	18.3 (64.9)	17.8 (64.0)	13.9 (57.0)	9.2 (48.6)	4.3 (39.7)	1.4 (34.5)	8.3 (46.9)
Record low °C (°F)	−12.0 (10.4)	−9.0 (15.8)	−7.2 (19.0)	−3.9 (25.0)	0.3 (32.5)	3.4 (38.1)	9.0 (48.2)	8.0 (46.4)	2.0 (35.6)	0.0 (32.0)	−5.3 (22.5)	−6.6 (20.1)	−12.0 (10.4)
Average precipitation mm (inches)	29.5 (1.16)	26.1 (1.03)	28.5 (1.12)	30.7 (1.21)	29.7 (1.17)	14.7 (0.58)	8.4 (0.33)	20.1 (0.79)	34.5 (1.36)	29.0 (1.14)	21.6 (0.85)	22.9 (0.90)	295.7 (11.64)
Average precipitation days (≥ 1.0 mm)	5.9	4.8	5.0	4.4	4.5	2.7	2.1	3.4	4.4	4.5	4.3	5.3	51.3
Average relative humidity (%)	72.9	66.8	58.0	53.9	47.3	36.5	30.3	33.8	49.0	57.3	69.1	77.2	54.3
Mean monthly sunshine hours	183.9	190.8	—	254.5	—	—	320.9	—	—	247.5	195.3	179.1	—
Source 1: NOAA
Source 2: WMO (max-min temperatures 1976–2005), climatebase.ru (extremes, humidity)

== Ecclesiastical history ==
During the Vandal Kingdom and Roman Empire the town was the seat of an ancient bishopric. The bishopric was important enough in the Late Roman province of Numidia to become one of the many suffragan bishoprics of its Metropolitan Archbishopric in Carthage.

It is possible that Christianity came to the town only after the rule of Constantine the Great, as there is no record of the bishopric under the Romans. The only known bishop of this African diocese is the Catholic bishop Salo mentioned in 484. This is considerably late compared to many of the other diocese in Numidia. Bishop Salo took part in the synod assembled in Carthage in 484 by the Arian ruler, Huneric of the Vandal Kingdom; after the Synod Salo was exiled (probably) to Vandal-controlled Sicily.

Like most bishoprics in Roman Africa, it faded after the Muslim conquest of the Maghreb.

=== Titular see ===
In 1933 the diocese was nominally restored as Latin Catholic titular bishopric.

It has had the following incumbents, mostly of the fitting episcopal (lowest) rank with an archiepiscopal (intermediary) exception:

- Titular Archbishop: Cardinal Francesco Morano (1962.04.05 – 1962.04.20)
- Vincent Billington, Mill Hill Missionaries (M.H.M.) (1965.05.03 – 1970.12.07)
- Alexius Obabu Makozi (1971.02.20 – 1972.07.30)
- Rudolph A. Akanlu (1972.11.16 – 1973.04.13)
- James Terry Steib, Divine Word Missionaries (S.V.D.) (1983.12.06 – 1993.03.24)
- Lorenzo Ceresoli (1993.12.20 – ...), Comboni Missionaries of the Heart of Jesus (M.C.C.J.), Apostolic Vicar emeritus of Awasa (Ethiopia)

== Culture ==
The inhabitants belong to the Ouled Naïl, also living in Biskra, M'Sila, Ghardaia and in Saharan Atlas.

== Sources and external links ==
- (in Arabic) Djelfa Forums
- GCatholic
- (in French) Djelfa - The capital of the Algerian Highlands
