= Ambia (Mauretania) =

Ambia was an ancient civitas in the Roman Empire, situated in present-day in Algeria. It is a modern titular see of the Roman Catholic. The colonia was located near the thermal baths of Hammam Bou Hani.

== Bishopric ==
Ambia remains an ancient episcopal see of the Roman–Berber province of Mauretania Caesariensis. One bishop can be attributed to this office, Filece, who was among the Catholic prelates summoned to Carthage in 484 by the Vandal king Huneric. Ambia survives today as a titular bishop; the current owner is Bishop John Migliorati, Apostolic Vicar of Awasa. Giovanni Migliorati, M.C.C.I. † (21 Mar 2009 Appointed - 12 May 2016 Died) Roberto Bergamaschi, S.D.B. (29 Jun 2016 Appointed
