= List of Catholic titular sees =

Annuario Pontificio Catholic Church

This is the official list of titular sees of the Catholic Church included in the Annuario Pontificio. Archiepiscopal sees are shown in bold.

The Italian-language Annuario Pontificio devotes some 200 pages to listing these sees, with up to a dozen names on each page. It gives their names in Latin (which are generally the names used also in English) as well as in Italian, and indicates the ancient Roman province to which most of them belonged or other geographical particulars, their status as metropolitan see or suffragan see (of episcopal or archiepiscopal rank), and basic biographical information about their current bishops.

== A ==
- Abaradira
- Abari
- Abbir Germaniciana (Africa proconsularis)
- Abbir Maius (Africa proconsularis)
- Abercornia
- Abernethia
- Abidda
- Abila in Palaestina
- Abila Lysaniae
- Abitinae
- Abora (Africa Proconsularis)
- Abrittum
- Absa Salla (Africa proconsularis)
- Absorus
- Abthugni (Africa proconsularis)
- Abula
- Abydus
- Abziri (Africa proconsularis)
- Acalissus
- Acarassus
- Acci
- Accia
- Acelum
- Achelous
- Acholla
- **Achrida** (Ohrid)
- Achyraus
- Acilisene
- Acmonia
- Acrassus
- Acropolis
- Acufida
- Adada
- **Adana** (Armenian Catholic Church)
- **Adana** (Melkite Catholic Church)
- Adraa
- Adramyttium
- Adrasus
- Adulis
- Aeca
- Aeclanum
- Aegae
- Aegeae
- **Aegina**
- Aela
- Aeliae
- Aemona
- Aenus
- Aëtus
- Aezani
- Africa
- Afufenia
- Agathonice
- Agathopolis
- Agbia (Africa)
- Aggar
- Aggersel
- Agnus
- Agrippias
- Aguntum
- Aggersel
- Alabanda
- Ala Miliaria
- Alava
- Alba
- Alba Maritima
- Albulae
- Aleria
- Alexandria Minor
- Alexanum
- Algiza
- Alia
- Aliezira
- Alinda
- Allegheny
- Alphocranon
- Altava
- Altiburus (Africa)
- Altinum
- Alton
- Amadassa
- Amaia
- Amantia
- **Amasea**
- **Amastris**
- Amathus in Cypro
- Amathus in Palaestina
- Amaura
- Ambia
- Amblada
- **Amida** (Armenian Catholic Church and Syriac Catholic Church)
- Amisus
- Amiternum
- Ammaedara
- Ammoniace
- **Amorium**
- Amphipolis
- Ampora
- Amudarsa
- Amyzon
- Anaea
- **Anasartha**
- Anastasiopolis
- Anatetarte
- Anazarbus
- Anbar (Chaldean Catholic Church)
- **Anchialus**
- Ancusa
- **Ancyra** (Armenian Catholic Church and Latin Church)
- Ancyra Ferrea
- Andeda
- Andrapa
- Andropolis
- Anemurium
- Anglona, Pandosia
- Anineta
- Antaeopolis
- Antandrus
- Antarados
- Anthedon
- Antigonea
- Antiphellus
- Antiphrae
- **Antinoë**
- Antiochia ad Maeandrum
- **Antiochia in Pisidia**
- Antiochia Parva
- Antipatris
- Antipyrgos
- Antium
- Apamea Cibotus
- **Apamea in Bithynia**
- **Apamea in Syria** (Maronite Church, Melkite Catholic Church and Syriac Catholic Church)
- Aperlae
- Aphnaeum
- Aphroditopolis
- Apisa Maius (Africa)
- Apollonia
- Apollonia Salbace
- Apollonias
- Apollonis
- Apollonopolis Magna
- Apollonopolis Parva
- Apollonos-Hieron
- Appia
- Appiaria
- **Aprus**
- Apta
- Aptuca (Africa)
- Aquae Albae in Byzacena
- Aquae Albae in Mauretania
- Aquae in Byzacena
- Aquae in Dacia
- Aquae in Mauretania
- Aquae in Numidia
- Aquae in Proconsulari (Africa)
- Aquae Flaviae
- Aquae Novae in Numidia
- Aquae Novae in Proconsulari (Africa Proconsularis)
- Aquae Regiae
- Aquae Sirenses
- Aquae Thibilitanae
- Aquaviva
- **Aquileia Patriarchate (in Italy)**
- Aquipendium
- Arabia
- Arabissus
- Arad
- Aradi
- Aradus
- Arae in Mauretania
- Arae in Numidia
- Arausio
- Araxa
- Arba
- Arbanum
- Arcadia
- Arcadiopolis in Asia
- **Arcadiopolis in Europa**
- Arca in Armenia
- Arca in Phoenicia (Latin Church and Maronite Church)
- Arcavica
- Archelaïs
- Ardamerium
- Árd Carna
- Árd Mór
- Árd Sratha
- Arena
- Areopolis
- Arethusa (Latin Church and Syriac Catholic Church)
- Argos
- Ariarathia
- Ariassus
- Arindela
- Arisitum
- Aristium
- Armentia
- Arna
- Arneae
- Arpi
- Arsacal
- Arsamosata
- Arsennaria
- Arsinoë in Arcadia
- Arsinoë in Cypro
- Artvin (Armenian Catholic Church)
- Arycanda
- Ascalon
- Aspendus
- Aspona
- Assava
- Assuras
- Assus
- Astigi
- Astypalaea
- Asuoremixta
- Atella
- Atenia
- Athribis
- Ath Truim
- Athyra
- Attaea
- Attalea in Lydia
- Attalea in Pamphylia
- Attanasus
- Attuda
- Auca
- Aufinium
- Augurus
- Augusta
- Augustopolis in Palaestina
- Augustopolis in Phrygia
- Aulon (Aulonensis)
- Aulon (Aulonitanus)
- Aureliopolis in Asia
- Aureliopolis in Lydia
- Aurocla
- Aurusuliana
- Ausafa
- Ausana (Africa)
- Ausuaga (Africa)
- Ausuccura
- Autenti
- Auzegera
- Auzia
- Aveia
- Africa Avensa (Africa)
- Avioccala (Africa)
- Avissa (Africa)
- Avitta Bibba
- Axomis
- Azotus
- Azura (diocese)

== B ==
- Bahanna
- Babylon
- Babra
- Bacanaria
- Bacatha in Arabia
- Bacatha in Palaestina
- Badiae
- Bagai
- Bagis
- Balneoregium
- Baia
- Balanea
- Balbura
- Balecium
- Baliana
- Bamaccora
- Bapara
- Bararus
- Barata
- Barbalissus
- Barca
- Barcusus
- Bardstown
- Bareta
- Bargala
- Bargylia
- Barica
- Baris in Hellesponto
- Baris in Pisidia
- Basilinopolis
- Bassiana
- Basti
- Batnae (Syriac Catholic Church)
- Bavagaliana
- Beatia
- Bela
- Belabitene
- Belali
- Bellicastrum
- Belesasa
- Bencenna
- Benda
- Benepota
- Beneventum
- Bennefa
- **Beroea**
- Berenice
- Berissa
- **Beroë**
- Berrhoea
- Betagbara
- Bethlehem
- Bettonium
- Bethzabda
- Beverlacum
- Biccari
- Bida
- Bigastro
- Bilta
- Binda
- Birtha
- Bisarchio
- Bisica
- Bistue
- Bisuldino
- Bitettum
- Bitylius
- **Bizya**
- Bladia
- Blanda Iulia
- Blaundus
- Blera
- Bonitza
- Bononia
- Bonusta
- Boreum
- Bosana
- **Bosporus**
- **Bostra**
- Botrys
- Botriana
- Brixellum
- Bria
- Briancio
- Britonia
- Briula
- Bruzus
- **Brysis**
- Bubastis
- Bubon
- Bucellus
- Budua
- Buffada
- Buleliana
- Bulgarophygum
- Bulla
- Bulla Regia
- Bulna
- Burca
- Bure
- Buruni
- Busiris
- Buslacena
- Butus
- Buthrotum
- Buxentum
- Byblus

== C ==
- Cabarsussi
- Cabasa
- Cabellicum
- Cadi
- Caeciri
- Caelanum
- Caere
- Caesarea in Bithynia
- **Caesarea in Cappadocia** (Armenian Catholic Church and Melkite Catholic Church)
- Caesarea Philippi
- Caesarea in Mauretania
- Caesarea in Numidia
- **Caesarea in Palaestina**
- Caesarea in Thessalia
- Caesariana
- Caesaropolis
- Caffa
- Calama
- Caldas de Reyes
- Caliabria
- California
- **Callinicum**
- Callipolis
- Caloe
- Caltadria
- Calydon
- Calynda
- **Camachus**
- Campania
- Camplum
- Camuliana
- Canapium
- Canatha
- Candyba
- Cannae
- Canosa
- Cantanus
- Capitolias
- Capra
- Capreae
- Caprulae
- Capsa
- Capsus
- Caput Cilla
- Carac-Moba
- Carallia
- Cardabunta
- Cardicium
- Cariana
- Carini
- Carinola
- Carmeiano
- Carpasia
- **Carpathus**
- Carpentrassum
- Carrhae
- **Carthage**
- Cartennae
- Carystus
- Casae Calanae
- Casae in Numidia
- Casae in Pamphylia
- Casae Medianae
- Casae Nigrae
- Casius
- Cassandria
- Castabala
- Castello
- Castellum Iabar
- Castellum in Mauretania
- Castellum in Numidia
- Castellum Medianum
- Castellum Minus
- Castellum Ripae
- Castellum Tatroportus
- Castellum Tingitii
- Castellum Titulianum
- Castoria
- Castra Galbae
- Castra Martis
- Castra Nova
- Castra Severiana
- Castro di Puglia
- Castro di Sardegna
- Castrum
- Castulo
- Catabum Castra
- Cataquas
- Catrum
- Catula
- Caudium
- Caunus
- Cavaillon
- Cea
- Ceanannus Mór
- Cebarades
- Cedamusa
- Cediae
- Cefa
- Cefala
- Celerina
- Cellae in Mauretania
- Cellae in Proconsulari
- Cell Ausaille
- Cemerianus
- Cenae
- Cenculiana
- Centenaria
- Centuria
- Centuriones
- Ceramus
- Ceramussa
- Cerasa
- Cerasus
- Cerbali
- Cercina
- Ceretapa
- Cerynia
- Cernitza
- Cestrus
- Chaialum (Syro-Malabar Catholic Church)
- **Chalcedonia**
- Chalcis in Europa
- Chalcis in Graecia
- **Chalcis in Syria**
- Chariopolis
- Chelm
- Chersonesus in Creta
- Chersonesus in Europa
- **Chersonesus in Zechia**
- Chiemium
- Chimaera
- Choma
- Chonochora
- Chullu
- Chunavia
- Christianopolis
- Christopolis
- Chrysopolis in Arabia
- Chrysopolis in Macedonia
- Chusra
- Chytri
- Cibalae
- Cibaliana
- Cibyra
- Cidramus
- Cidyessus
- Cilibia
- Cillium
- Cincari
- Cinna
- Cinnaborium
- Cynopolis in Aegypto
- Cynopolis in Arcadia
- Circesium
- Cisamus
- Ciscissus
- Cissa
- Cissi
- Cissita
- Citharizum
- Citium
- Citrus
- Città Ducale
- **Cius**
- Civitate
- Claneus
- Claternae
- **Claudiopolis in Honoriade**
- Claudiopolis in Isauria
- Clazomenae
- Cleopatris
- Cluain Iraird
- Cluentum
- Clypia
- Clysma
- Cnidus
- Cnossus
- Codaca
- Codrula
- Coela
- Coeliana
- Colbasa
- Colophon
- **Colonia in Armenia**
- Colonia in Cappadocia
- Colossae
- Columnata
- Colybrassus
- Comama
- Comana Armeniae
- Comana Pontica
- Comba
- Conana
- Concordia in America
- Cone
- Constantia in Arabia
- Constantia in Thracia
- Constantina
- Coprithis
- Coptus
- Coracesium
- Corada
- Corbavia
- **Corinthus**
- Corna
- Corniculana
- Corone
- Coronea
- Coropissus
- Corycus
- Corydala
- Cos
- Cotenna
- **Cotrada**
- **Cotyaeum**
- Cova
- Cozyla
- Cratia
- Cremna
- Crepedula
- Cresima
- Croae
- Cubda
- Cufruta
- Cucusus
- Cuicul
- Culusi
- Cuncacestre
- Cunga Féichin
- Cumae
- Curium
- Cursola
- Curubis
- Cures Sabinorum
- Cusae
- Cyanae
- Cybistra
- Cyme
- Cyparissia
- **Cypsela**
- Cyrene
- **Cyrrhus**
- **Cyzicus**

== D ==
- Dadibra
- Dadima
- Dagnum
- Daimlaig
- Daldis
- Dalisandus in Isauria
- Dalisandus in Pamphylia
- **Damascus**
- **Damiata** (Melkite Catholic Church)
- Danaba
- Daonium
- Daphnusia
- Daphnutium
- **Dara** (Syriac Catholic Church)
- Dardanus
- **Darnis**
- Dascylium
- Daulia
- Dausara
- Decoriana
- Demetrias
- Derbe
- **Dercos**
- Deultum
- Diana
- Dianum
- Dices
- Diocaesarea in Isauria
- Diocaesarea in Palaestina
- Dioclea
- Diocletiana
- Diocletianopolis in Palaestina, in Palaestina Prima
- Diocletianopolis in Thracia
- Diocletianopolis in Thebaide
- Dionysias
- Dionysiana
- Dionysiopolis
- Dioshieron
- Diospolis Inferior
- Diospolis in Thracia
- Diospolis Superior
- Dium
- Doara (Eastern Catholic Churches)
- Doberus
- Docimium
- **Doclea**
- Dodona
- Dolia
- Doliche
- Dometiopolis
- Domnach Sechnaill
- Dora
- Dorylaeum
- Dragobitia
- Dragonara
- Drivastum
- **Drizipara**
- Drua
- Drusiliana
- Dumium
- Dystis

== E ==
- Eanach Dúin
- Electa
- Ecdaumava
- Echinus
- Ecsalus
- Edessa in Macedonia
- **Edessa in Osrhoëne** (Melkite Catholic Church and Syriac Catholic Church)
- Edistiana
- Egabro
- Egara
- Egnatia
- Egnazia Appula
- Eguga
- Elaea
- Elatea
- Elephantaria in Mauretania
- Elephantaria in Proconsulari
- Elepla
- Eleutherna
- Eleutheropolis in Macedonia
- Eleutheropolis in Palaestina
- Elicroca
- Elis
- Elmhama
- Elo
- Elusa
- Elvas
- Eminentiana
- Emmaüs
- Enera
- **Ephesus**
- Epidaurum
- Epiphania in Cilicia
- Epiphania in Syria
- Equilium
- Equizetum
- Eraclea
- Erdonia
- Eressus
- Eriza
- Erra
- Erythrae
- Erythrum
- Erzerum (Armenian Catholic Church)
- Esbus
- Etenna
- Euaza
- **Euchaitae**
- Eucarpia
- Eudocia
- Eudocias
- Eudoxias
- Eumenia
- Euroea in Epiro
- Euroea in Phoenicia
- Europus
- Eutyme
- Ezero

== F ==
- Falerii
- Falerone
- Fallaba
- Famagusta
- Fata
- Faustinopolis
- Febiana
- Feradi Maius
- Feradi Minus
- Ferentium
- Fesseë
- Ficus
- Fidenae
- Fidoloma
- Filaca
- Fiorentino
- Fissiana
- Flavias
- Flumenpiscense
- Flenucleta
- Floriana
- Flumenzer
- Foratiana
- Forconium
- Forma
- Formiae
- Forontoniana
- Forum Flaminii
- Forum Novum
- Forum Popilii
- Forum Traiani
- Fundi
- Frequentium
- Fronta
- Fuerteventura
- Furnos Maior
- Furnos Minor
- Fussala

== G ==
- Gabae
- **Gabala**
- Gabii
- Gabula
- Gadara
- Gadiaufala
- Gaguari
- Galazia in Campania
- Gallesium
- Galtelli
- **Gangra**
- Garba
- Gardar
- **Garella**
- Gargara
- Garriana
- Gaudiaba
- Gauriana
- Gaza
- Gazera
- Gegi
- Gemellae in Byzacena
- Gemellae in Numidia
- Gera
- Gerara
- Gerasa
- Gergis
- **Germa in Hellesponto**
- Germa in Galatia
- Germania in Dacia
- Germania in Numidia
- Germanicia
- Germaniciana
- Germanicopolis
- **Germia**
- Gibba
- Gigthi
- Gilba
- Gindarus
- Girba
- Giru Marcelli
- Giru Mons
- Girus
- Girus Tarasii
- Gisipa
- Giufi
- Giufi Salaria
- Glastonia
- Glavinitza
- Glenndálocha
- Gomphi
- Gor
- Gordus
- Gordoserba
- Gortyna
- Gradisca
- Gradum
- Grass Valley
- Gratiana
- Gratianopolis
- Gravelbourg
- Grumentum
- Guardialfiera
- Gubaliana
- Gummi in Byzacena
- Gummi in Proconsulari
- Gunela
- Gunugus
- Gurza
- Guzabeta

== H ==
- Hadrianae
- Hadriani ad Olympum
- Hadriania
- **Hadrianopolis in Haemimonto**
- Hadrianopolis in Epiro
- Hadrianopolis in Honoriade
- Hadrianopolis in Pisidia
- Hadrianotherae
- Hadrumetum
- Halicarnassus
- Harpasa
- Hebron
- Helenopolis in Bithynia
- Helenopolis in Palaestina
- Heliopolis in Augustamnica
- **Heliopolis in Phoenicia**
- Heliosebaste
- Helos
- Hemeria
- **Hemesa**
- Hephaestus
- Heraclea ad Latmum
- **Heraclea in Europa**
- Heraclea Pelagoniae
- Heraclea Pontica
- Heraclea Salbace
- Heracleopolis Magna
- Herdonia
- Hermiana
- Hermocapelia
- Hermonthis
- Hermopolis Major
- Hermopolis Parva
- Hexamilium
- Hierapolis in Isauria
- **Hierapolis in Phrygia**
- **Hierapolis in Syria** (Melkite Catholic Church and Syriac Catholic Church)
- Hierapytna
- Hierissus
- Hierocaesarea
- Hieron
- Hieropolis
- Hierpiniana
- Hilta
- Hippo Diarrhytus
- Hirina
- Hirta
- Hispellum
- Hodelm (Hoddam)
- Hólar
- Homona
- Horaea
- Horrea
- Horrea Aninici
- Horrea Coelia
- Horreomargum
- Horta
- Hortanum, Horta
- Hospita
- Hyccara
- Hyda in Lycaonia
- Hyllarima
- Hypaepa
- Hypselis
- Hyrcanis

== I ==
- Iabruda
- Iamnia
- Iasus
- Ibora
- **Iconium**
- Ida in Mauretania
- Idassa
- Idebessus
- Idicra
- Ierafi
- Ierichus
- Igilgili
- Ilistra
- Iliturgi
- Ilium
- Illici
- Ingila
- Inis Cathaig
- Insula
- Intervallum
- Iomnium
- Ionopolis
- Ioppe
- Ios
- Iotapa in Isauria
- Iotapa in Palaestina
- Ipagro
- Ipsus
- Irenopolis in Cilicia
- Irenopolis in Isauria
- Iria Flavia
- Isauropolis
- Isba
- Isinda
- Ita
- Italica
- Iubaltiana
- Iucundiana
- Iuliopolis
- Iulium Carnicum
- Iunca in Byzacena
- Iunca in Mauretania
- Iziriana
- Izirzada

== J ==
- Jamestown
- **Justiniana Prima**
- Justinianopolis in Galatia

== K ==
- **Kashkar** (Chaldean Catholic Church)
- Kearney
- Kharput (Armenian Catholic Church)

== L ==
- Labicum
- Lacedaemonia
- Lacubaza
- Lagania
- Lagina
- La Imperial
- Lamasba
- Lambaesis
- Lambiridi
- Lamdia
- Lamia
- Lamiggiga
- Lamphua
- Lampsacus
- Lamsorti
- Lamus
- Lamzella
- Laodicea ad Libanum
- Laodicea Combusta
- Laodicea in Phrygia
- Laodicea in Syria
- Lapda
- Lapithus
- Lappa
- Laranda
- Lares
- Lari Castellum
- Larissa in Syria
- **Larissa in Thessalia**
- Latopolis
- **Lauriacum**
- Lauzadus
- Lavellum
- Lead
- Leavenworth
- Lebedus
- Lebessus
- Leges
- Legia
- Legis Volumni
- Lemellefa
- Lemfocta
- **Lemnus**
- Leontium
- **Leontopolis in Augustamnica**
- **Leontopolis in Pamphylia**
- Leptiminus
- Leptis Magna
- Lerus
- Lesina
- Lestrona
- Lesvi
- Lete
- Letopolis
- **Leucas**
- Leuce
- Liberalia
- Libertina
- Lidoricium
- Lilybaeum
- Limata
- Limisa
- Limnae
- Limyra
- Lindisfarne
- Linoë
- Lipara
- Lititza
- Litomyšl
- Litterae
- Livias
- Lizicus
- Lorium
- Loryma
- Lugmad
- Lugura
- Lunda
- Luni
- Lupadium
- Luperciana
- **Luxemburgum**
- Lycaonia
- Lydda
- Lyrbe
- Lysias
- Lysinia
- Lystra

== M ==
- Macomades
- Macomades Rusticiana
- Macon
- Macra
- Macri
- Macriana in Mauretania
- Macriana Maior
- Macriana Minor
- Mactaris
- Madarsuma
- Madaurus
- Mades
- Madytus
- Maeonia
- Magarmel
- Mageó
- Magnesia ad Maeandrum
- Magnesia ad Sipylum
- Magnetum
- Magydus
- Maillezais
- Maina
- Maiuca
- Maiumas Gazae
- Malliana
- Mallus
- Malus
- Manaccenser
- Maraguia
- Marasc (Armenian Catholic Church)
- Marazanae
- Marazanae Regiae
- Marcelliana
- Marciana
- Marcianopolis
- Marcopolis
- **Mardin** (Armenian Catholic Church, Chaldean Catholic Church, and Syriac Catholic Church)
- Mareotes
- Margum
- Mariamme
- Mariana in Corsica
- Marianopolis in Michigania (Sault Ste. Marie, Michigan)
- Marida
- Marmarizana
- Maronana
- **Maronea**
- Martanae Tudertinorum
- Martirano
- **Martyropolis**
- Masclianae
- Mascula
- Massa Lubrense
- Mastaura in Asia
- Mastaura in Lycia
- Masuccaba
- Materiana
- Mathara in Numidia
- Mathara in Proconsulari
- Matrega
- Mattiana
- Maturba
- Maura
- Mauriana
- Maximianae
- Maximiana in Byzacena
- Maximiana in Numidia
- Maximianopolis in Arabia
- Maximianopolis in Palaestina
- Maximianopolis in Pamphylia
- **Maximianopolis in Rhodope**
- Maximianopolis in Thebaide
- Maxita
- Maxula Prates
- Mazaca
- Medaba
- Medea
- Medeli
- Media
- Mediana
- Medianas Zabuniorum
- Megalopolis in Peloponneso
- Megalopolis in Proconsulari
- Megara
- Mela
- **Melitene** (Armenian Catholic Church and Latin Church)
- Meloë in Isauria
- Meloë in Lycia
- Melzi
- Membressa
- Memphis
- Menefessi
- Menelaites
- Menois
- Mentesa
- Mercia
- Merus
- Mesarfelta
- Mesembria
- Mesotymolus
- Messene
- Meta
- Metaba
- Metelis
- Metellopolis
- Methone
- **Methymna**
- Metrae
- Metropolis in Asia
- Metropolis in Pisidia
- Metropolis of Kastoria
- Mevania
- Mibiarca
- Midaëum
- Midica
- Mididi
- Midila
- Migirpa
- Miletopolis
- **Miletus**
- Milevum
- Mimiana
- Mina
- Minervium
- Minora
- Minturnae
- Misenum
- Missua
- **Misthia**
- **Mitylene**
- Mizigi
- Mnizus
- **Mocissus**
- Modra
- Modruš
- Moglaena
- Molicunza
- Monembasia
- Mons in Mauretania
- Mons in Numidia
- Montecorvino
- Montefiascone
- Monterano
- Monteverde
- **Mopsuestia**
- Mopta
- Morosbisdus
- Mossyna
- Mostene
- Mosynopolis
- Motula
- Moxori
- Mozotcori
- Mulia
- Mulli
- Munatiana
- Mundinitza
- Municipa
- Murcona
- Murthlacum
- Murustaga
- Musbanda
- Mush (Armenian Catholic Church)
- Musti
- Musti in Numidia
- Muteci
- Mutia
- Mutugenna
- Muzuca in Byzacena
- Muzuca in Proconsulari
- Mylasa
- Myndus
- **Myra** (Melkite Catholic Church and Latin Church)
- Myrica
- Myrina

== N ==
- Nabala
- Nachingwea
- **Nacolia**
- Naiera
- Naissus
- Nara
- Naraggara
- Naratcata
- Narona
- Nasai
- Nasala
- Nasbinca
- Natchesium
- Natchitoches
- Naucratis
- Nauplia
- Nazianzus
- Nationa
- Nea Aule
- Neapolis in Arabia
- Neapolis in Caria
- Neapolis in Cypro
- Neapolis in Isauria
- Neapolis in Palaestina
- **Neapolis in Pisidia**
- Neapolis in Proconsulari
- Nea Valentia
- Nebbi
- Nebbio
- Neila
- Neocaesarea (episcopal see)
- Neocaesarea in Bithynia
- **Neocaesarea in Ponto**
- Neocaesarea in Syria
- Novae Patrae
- Nepeta
- Nepte
- Nesqually
- Neve
- Newport
- **Nicaea**
- **Nicaea Parva**
- Nicius
- Nicives
- **Nicomedia**
- Nicolopolis ad Iaterum
- **Nicopolis ad Nestum**
- Nicopolis in Armenia
- **Nicopolis in Epiro**
- **Nicopsis**
- **Nicosia**
- Nigizubi
- Nigrae Maiores
- Nilopolis
- Nisa in Lycia
- **Nisibis** (Chaldean Catholic Church and Maronite Catholic Church)
- Nisyrus
- Noba
- Nomentum
- Nona
- Nova
- Nova Barbara
- Nova Caesaris
- Nova Germania
- Novaliciana
- Nova Petra
- Nova Sinna
- Nova Sparsa
- Novae
- Novi
- Novica
- **Nubia**
- Numana or Humana
- Numericus
- Numida
- Numluli
- Nysa in Asia
- Nyssa

== O ==
- Oasis Magna
- Obba
- Obori
- Oca
- Octaba
- Octabia
- Octava
- **Odessus**
- Oëa
- Oenoanda
- Oescus
- Olba
- Olbia
- Olena
- Olympus
- Oliva
- Ombi
- Onchesmus
- Onuphis
- Opitergium
- Opus
- Oppidum Consillinum
- Oppidum Novum
- Orcistus
- Oregon City
- Oreus
- Oreto
- Orthosias in Caria
- Orthosias in Phoenicia
- Orymna
- Ostra
- Ostracine
- Othana
- Othona
- Otriculum
- Otrus
- Ottocium
- **Oxyrhynchus**

== P ==
- Pachnemunis
- Paestum
- Palaeopolis in Asia
- Palaeopolis in Pamphylia
- Palmyra
- **Paltus**
- Pamphilus
- Panatoria
- Penephysis
- Pandosia, Anglona
- Panemotichus
- Panium
- Panopolis
- Paphus
- Pappa
- Paraetonium
- Paralus
- Parembolae in Arabia
- Parembolae in Palaestina
- Paria
- **Parium**
- Parlais
- Parthenia
- Parus
- Patara
- **Patrae**
- Pausulae
- Pauzera
- **Pedachtoë**
- Pederodiana
- Pegae
- Pella
- Peltae
- **Pelusium** (Latin Church and Melkite Catholic Church)
- Penafiel
- Perdices
- Pergamum
- **Perge**
- Peristasis
- Peritheorium
- Perperene
- Perrhe
- Pertusa
- **Pessinus**
- Petina
- Petinessus
- Pednelissus
- Petra in Aegypto
- Petra in Lazica
- **Petra in Palaestina**
- Phacusa
- Phaena
- Pharan
- Pharbaetus
- Pharsalus
- Phaselis
- Phasis
- Phatanus
- Phelbes
- Phellus
- Philadelphia in Arabia
- Philadelphia in Lydia
- Philadelphia Minor
- Philae
- **Philippi**
- Philippopolis in Arabia
- **Philippopolis in Thracia**
- Philomelium
- Phoba
- Phocaea
- Phoenice
- Photice
- Phragonis
- Phulli
- Phytea
- Pia
- Pinara
- Pinhel
- Pionia
- Pisita
- Pitanae
- Plataea
- Platamon
- Plestia
- Ploaghe
- Plotinopolis
- Pocofeltus
- Podalia
- Poemanenum
- Poetovium
- Pogla
- Polemonium
- Polybotus
- Polinianum
- Polymartium
- Polystylus
- Pomaria
- **Pompeiopolis in Cilicia**
- **Pompeiopolis in Paphlagonia**
- Populonia
- Porphyreon
- Porthmus
- Potentiz in Piceno
- Praenetus
- Praesidium
- Precausa
- **Preslavus**
- Priene
- Privata
- Proconnesus
- Prostanna
- Prusa (Armenian Catholic Church and Latin Church)
- Prusias ad Hypium
- Prymnessus
- Pselchis
- Psibela
- Ptolemais in Libya
- Ptolemais in Phoenicia (Latin Church and Maronite Church)
- **Ptolemais in Thebaide**
- Pudentiana
- Pulcheriopolis
- Pumentum
- Pupiana
- Puppi
- Putia in Byzacena
- Putia in Numidia
- Pyrgos

== Q ==
- Quaestoriana, Byzacena (Tunisia)
- Quincy (Illinois, USA)
- Quiza (El-Benian, Algeria)

== R ==
- Rachlea
- Raphanea
- Raphia
- Ramsbiria
- Rapidum
- **Ratiaria**
- Rebellum
- Regiana
- Regiae
- Remesiana
- Reperi
- Respecta, Numidia
- Ressiana
- **Rew-Ardashir** (Chaldean Catholic Church)
- Rhaedestus
- Rhandus
- Rhasus
- Rhesaina
- Rhinocorura
- **Rhizaeum**
- Rhodiapolis
- Rhodopolis
- Rhoga
- **Rhoina**
- Rhosus
- **Rhusium**
- Risinium
- Ros Cré
- Rota
- Rossmarkaeum
- Rotaria
- Rotdon
- Rubicon
- Rufiniana
- Rusada
- Rusguniae
- Rusellae
- Rusicade
- Ruspae
- Rusubbicari
- Rusubisir
- Rusuca
- Rusuccuru (Titular See)
- Rutabo

== S ==
- Sabadia
- Sebana
- Sabrata
- Saepinum
- Saesina
- Saetabis
- Sagalassus
- Sagone
- Saia Maior
- Saint-Papoul
- Sais
- Saittae
- Sala
- Salamias
- **Salamis**
- Saldae
- Salona
- Salapia
- Samos
- **Samosata**
- Sanavus
- Sanctus Germanus
- Sanitium
- San Leone
- Santa Giusta
- Sarda
- **Sardes**
- Sarepta (Latin Church and Maronite Church)
- Sariphaea
- Sarsenterum
- Sasabe
- Sasima
- Sassura
- Sata
- Satafi
- Satafis
- Satala in Armenia
- Satala in Lydia
- Satrianum
- Sauatra
- Sbida
- Scala
- Scampa
- Scardona
- Scarphea
- Scebatiana
- Scepsis
- Schedia
- Sciathus
- Scilium
- Scopelus in Haemimonto
- Scopelus in Thessalia
- Scutarium
- Scyrus
- **Scythopolis**
- Sebarga
- **Sebaste** (Armenian Catholic Church)
- **Sebastea**
- Sebaste in Cilicia
- Sebaste in Phrygia
- Sebaste in Palaestina
- **Sebastopolis in Abasgia**
- Sebastopolis in Armenia
- Sebastopolis in Thracia
- Sebela
- Sebennytus
- Seert (Chaldean Catholic Church)
- Segermes
- Segia
- Segisama
- Seina
- Sela
- Selemselae
- Selendeta
- **Seleucia in Isauria**
- Seleucia Ferrea
- Seleucia Pieria
- Seleuciana
- Seleucobelus
- **Selge**
- Selia
- Selinus
- Selsea
- **Selymbria**
- Semina
- Semnea
- Semta
- Serbia
- Sereddeli
- Sergentza
- Sergiopolis
- Serigene
- Serra
- **Serrae**
- Serta
- Sesta
- Setea
- Sethroë
- Septimunicia
- Severiana
- Sfasferia
- Sibidunda
- Siblia
- Sicca Veneria
- Siccenna
- Siccesi
- Sicilibba
- Syca
- Sicyon
- **Side**
- Sidnacestre
- Sidon
- Sidyma
- Sigus
- Sila
- Silandus
- Silli
- **Silyum**
- Simidicca
- Simingi
- Siminina
- Simitthu
- Sinda
- Siniandus
- Sinitis
- Sinna
- Sinnada in Mauretania
- Sinnipsa
- Sinnuara
- Sinope
- Sion
- Sita
- Sitifis
- Sitipa
- Skálholt
- Slebte
- Socia
- Soldaia
- Soli
- Sophene
- Sora
- Sorres
- **Soteropolis**
- Sozopolis in Haemimonto
- Sozopolis in Pisidia
- Sozusa in Libya
- Sozusa in Palaestina
- Stadia
- Stagnum
- Stagoi
- **Stauropolis**
- Stephaniacum
- Stectorium
- Stobi
- Strathernia
- Stratonicea in Caria
- Stratonicea in Lydia
- Strongoli
- Strongyle
- Strumnitza
- Suacia
- Suas
- Suava
- Subaugusta
- Subbar
- Subrita
- Sucarda
- Succuba
- Suelli
- Sufar
- Sufasar
- Sufes
- Sufetula
- **Sugdaea**
- Sulci
- Suliana
- Sullectum
- Summa
- Summula
- Sura
- Surista
- Sutrium
- Sutunura
- Sycomazon
- Syedra
- Syene
- Synaus
- **Synnada in Phrygia**

== T ==
- Tabae
- Tabaicara, Mauretania Caesariensis
- Tabala, Lydia
- Tabalta
- Tabbora
- Tabla, Mauretania Caesariensis
- Taborenta, Mauretania Caesariensis
- Tabuda, Numidia
- Tabunia, Mauretania Caesariensis
- Tacapae
- Tacarata, Numidia
- Tacia Montana, Africa (Roman province)
- Tadamata
- Taddua
- Taenarum, Laconia
- Tagarata
- Tagarbala
- Tagaria
- Tagase
- Tagritum (Syriac Catholic Church)
- Taium
- Talaptula
- Tamada
- Tamagrista
- Tamallula
- Tamalluma
- Tamascani
- Tamasus
- Tamata
- Tamazeni
- Tamazuca
- Tambeae
- Tamiathis
- Tanagra
- Tanais
- Tanaramusa
- Tanis
- Tanudaia
- Taparura
- Tapasa
- Taraqua
- Tarasa in Byzacena
- Tarasa in Numidia
- **Tarsus** (Latin Church, Maronite Church, and Melkite Catholic Church)
- Tasaccora
- Tatilti
- Taua
- Taurianum
- Tauromenium
- Tavium
- Tegea
- Teglata in Numidia
- Teglata in Proconsulari
- Tela
- Telde
- Tell-Mahrê
- Telmissus
- Temenothyrae
- Temnos
- Temuniana
- Tenedus
- Tentyris
- Teos
- Tepelta
- Terenuthis
- Termessus
- **Ternobus**
- Tetci
- Teuchira
- Thabraca
- Thagamuta
- Thagaste
- Thagora
- Thala
- Thamugadi
- Thapsus
- Tharros
- Thasbalta
- Thasus
- Thaumacus
- **Thebae**
- Thebae Phthiotides
- Thelepte
- Themisonium
- Thenae
- Thennesus
- Theodoropolis
- Theodosiopolis in Arcadia
- Theodosiopolis in Armenia
- Thermae Basilicae
- Thermae Himerae
- Thérouanne
- Thespiae
- **Thessalonica**
- Theudalis
- Theuzi
- Theveste
- Thiava
- Thibaris
- Thibica
- Thibilis
- Thibiuca
- Thibuzabetum
- Thiges
- Thignica
- Thimida
- Thimida Regia
- Thinis
- Thinisa in Numidia
- Thisiduo
- Thizica
- Thmuis
- Thois
- Thubunae in Numidia
- Thuburbo Maius
- Thuburbo Minus
- Thuburnica
- Thubursicum
- Thubursicum-Bure
- Thuccabora
- Thucca in Mauretania
- Thucca in Numidia
- Thucca Terenbenthina
- Thugga
- Thunigaba
- Thunudruma
- Thunusuda
- Thurio
- Thyatira
- Thysdrus
- Tiberias
- Tiberiopolis
- **Tiburnia**
- Tiddi
- Tigamibena
- Tigava
- Tigias
- Tigillava
- Tigimma
- Tigisis in Mauretania (Taourga, Algeria)
- Tigisis in Numidia (Aïn el-Bordj, Algeria)
- Tiguala
- Timici
- Timidana
- Tingaria
- Tinis in Proconsulari
- Tinista
- Tinum
- Tipasa in Mauretania
- Tipasa in Numidia
- Tisedi
- Tisili
- Titiopolis
- Tituli in Numidia
- Tituli in Proconsulari
- Tityassus
- Tium
- Tlos
- Tokat (Armenian Catholic Church)
- **Tomi**
- Tongeren/Tongres
- Torcello
- Tortibulum
- Tracula
- Tragurium
- Traianopolis in Phrygia
- **Traianopolis in Rhodope**
- Traiectum ad Mosam
- Tralles in Asia
- Tralles in Lydia
- Transmarisca
- Trapezopolis
- **Trapezus** (Latin Church and Armenian Catholic Church)
- Treba
- Trebenna
- Trebia
- Trecalae
- Tremithus
- Tres Tabernae
- Trevico
- Tricca
- Tripolis in Lydia
- Tripolis in Phoenicia
- Trisipa
- Troas
- Trocmades
- Troezene
- Trofimiana
- Troyna
- Truentum
- Tubernuca
- Tubia
- Tubulbaca
- Tubunae in Mauretania
- Tubusuptu
- Tubyza
- Tucci
- Tulana
- Tullia
- Tunes (Tunis, Tunisia)
- Tunnuna
- Turres Ammeniae, Numidia
- Turres Concordiae, Numidia
- Turres in Byzacena, Byzacena
- Turres in Numidia, Numidia
- Turrisblanda, (Africa) Byzacena
- Turris in Mauretania, Mauretania Caesariensis
- Turris in Proconsulari, Africa Proconsularis
- Turris Rotunda
- Turris Tamalleni
- Turuda
- Turuzi
- Tuscamia
- Tuscania
- Tusuros
- **Tyana**
- Tymandus, Pisidia
- Tymbrias
- Tyndaris
- Tyriaeum, Pisidia
- **Tyrus (Lebanon)**
- Tzernicus

== U ==
- Ubaba
- Ubaza
- Uccula
- Uchi Maius
- Ucres
- Ulcinium
- Ulpiana
- Ululi
- Umbriatico
- Unizibira
- Uppenna
- Urbs Salvia
- Urci
- Urima
- Ursona
- Urusi
- Usinaza
- Usula
- Uthina
- Utica
- Utimma
- Utimmira
- Uzalis
- Uzzipari
- Uzita

== V ==
- Vada
- Vadesi
- Vaga
- Vagadensi
- Vagal
- Vageata
- Vagrauta
- Vaison
- Valabria
- Valentiniana
- Valentia
- Valeria
- Valliposita
- Vallis
- Vamalia
- Vanariona
- Vannida
- Vardimissa
- Vartana
- Vasada
- Vassinassa
- Vatarba
- Vazari
- Vazari-Didda
- Vazi-Sarra
- Vegesela in Byzacena
- Vegesela in Numidia
- **Velebusdus**
- Velefi
- Velia
- Velicia
- Verbe
- Vergi
- Verinopolis
- **Verissa**
- Verrona
- Vertara
- Vescera
- Vibiana
- Vibo
- Vico Equense
- Voghenza
- Victoriana
- Vicus Aterii
- Vicus Augusti
- Vicus Caesaris
- Vicus Pacati
- Vicus Turris
- Villamagna in Proconsulari
- Villamagna in Tripolitania
- Villa Nova
- Villa Regis
- **Viminacium**
- Vina
- Vincennes
- Vinda
- Virunum
- Vissalsa
- Vita
- Vittoriana
- Voli
- Volsinium
- Volturnum
- Voncaria
- Voncariana
- Vulturaria
- Vulturia

== W ==
- Walla Walla
- Wiener Neustadt

== X ==
- Xanthe
- Xanthus
- Xois

== Y ==
- Ypres (Ieper)

== Z ==
- Zaba
- Zabi
- Zabulon
- Zagylis
- Zaliche
- Zallata
- Zama Major
- Zama Minor
- Zapara
- Zaraï
- Zaratovium
- Zarna
- Zarzela
- Zattara
- Zela
- Zella
- Zenobias
- Zenopolis in Isauria
- Zenopolis in Lycia
- Zephyrium
- Zerta
- Zeugma in Mesopotamia
- Zeugma in Syria
- Ziqua
- Zoara
- Zorava
- Zorolus
- Zucchabar
- Zuri
- Zygana
- Zygris

== See also ==
For nearly all titular sees in partibus infidelium (formerly Roman/Byzantine, presently Islamic countries):

- List of Catholic dioceses in Algeria
- List of Catholic dioceses in Egypt
- List of Catholic dioceses in Iraq
- List of Catholic dioceses in Lebanon
- List of Catholic dioceses in Libya
- List of Catholic dioceses in Morocco, Mauretania and Western Sahara
- List of Catholic dioceses in Syria
- List of Catholic dioceses in Tunisia

== Sources and external links ==
- GCatholic – titular Metropolitan sees
- GCatholic – titular Archiepiscopal sees
- GCatholic – titular Episcopal sees
- Catholic-hierarchy;org – List of titular sees
