= Hadriania =

Hadriania may refer to:

- Hadriania (Mysia), an Ancient city and former bishopric in Asia Minor, now a Latin Catholic titular see
- Hadriania (gastropod), a genus of sea snails
