= Verisa =

Verisa may refer to:

- Verissa (Berissa)
- Mazda Verisa
