= List of shipwrecks in December 1868 =

The list of shipwrecks in December 1868 includes ships sunk, foundered, grounded, or otherwise lost during December 1868.

== 1 December ==
List of shipwrecks: 1 December 1868
Ship	State	Description
Castigliona	United Kingdom	The full-rigged ship was wrecked on the coast of County Wexford with the loss of five of her sixteen crew. She was on a voyage from Liverpool, Lancashire to Bombay, India. She was refloated on 12 December and towed into Liverpool by the steamships Duncannon and Ross, and the tug William Wallace (all United Kingdom).
Cynthia	United Kingdom	The ship departed from Summerside, Prince Edward Island, Canada for Liverpool, Lancashire. No further trace, presumed foundered with the loss of all hands.
Grietje	Netherlands	The fishing vessel was wrecked in the Dogger Bank. Her crew were rescued by the fishing smack Criterion (United Kingdom).

== 2 December ==
List of shipwrecks: 2 December 1868
Ship	State	Description
Beyham	United Kingdom	The ship ran aground on the Knock Sand. She was on a voyage from Saint Petersburg, Russia to Waterford. She was refloated and assisted into Grimsby, Lincolnshire by a lifeboat.
Madelon	France	The ship was wrecked at Naples, Italy.
Maids	United Kingdom	The ship ran aground on the Ouse Sand, in the Thames Estuary. She was refloated.
Marie	Prussia	The ship was wrecked at Cork, United Kingdom with the loss of all hands.

== 3 December ==
List of shipwrecks: 3 December 1868
Ship	State	Description
Alexandra	United Kingdom	The ship was driven ashore. She was on a voyage from Riga, Russia to Belfast, County Antrim.
Annie	Denmark	The schooner was wrecked on Souter Point, Northumberland, United Kingdom. She was on a voyage from London to the Tyne.
Ethuriel	United Kingdom	The brigantine collided with the barque Liverpool (United Kingdom) and was beached in the Belfast Lough. She was on a voyage from Belfast, County Antrim to Maryport, Cumberland. She was refloated and towed back to Belfast.
Flora	United Kingdom	The ship was abandoned on St. Peter's Bank. Her crew were rescued. She was on a voyage from Quebec City, Canada to Liverpool, Lancashire. She was taken into Old Man's Bay, where she was condemned.
Flora	Denmark	The schooner was wrecked on Souter Point. She was on a voyage from London to the River Tyne.
Gefuil	Sweden	The ship was driven ashore on the Middle Sand, in the Humber. She was on a voyage from Gävle to the Humber.
Harfruen	Flag unknown	The barque was towed into Great Yarmouth, Norfolk, United Kingdom in a waterlogged condition.
Rival	United Kingdom	The ship struck the quayside at Ramsgate, Kent and became severely leaky. She was on a voyage from Antwerp, Belgium to Saint John's, Newfoundland Colony.
Victoria	Denmark	The schooner collided with Berwick (United Kingdom) and sank off the mouth of the River Tyne. Her crew were rescued by Berwick. Victoria was on a voyage from London, United Kingdom to the River Tyne.
William Gillies	United Kingdom	The barque was driven ashore at "Carrendall", Argyllshire. Her fifteen crew were rescued by the Campbeltown Lifeboat Lord Murray ( Royal National Lifeboat Institution). William Gillies was on a voyage from London to Ardrossan, Ayrshire.
Unnamed	Denmark	The schooner was run down and sunk in the North Sea off Marsden, County Durham by the steamship Berwick (United Kingdom). Her crew were rescued by Berwick.

== 4 December ==
List of shipwrecks: 4 December 1868
Ship	State	Description
Andrew Jackson	United Kingdom	The clipper was wrecked on a reef in the Gaspar Strait in the Netherlands East Indies.
Annie Kimball	United Kingdom	The ship struck a rock in the Gaspar Strait and was damaged. She was on a voyage from Shanghai, China to Batavia, Netherlands East Indies. She completed her voyage, but was consequently condemned.
Brothers	United Kingdom	The skiff capsized at Greenock, Renfrewshire. Her three crew were rescued by a steamship.
Clara Novello	United Kingdom	The ship departed from Charlottetown, Prince Edward Island, Canada for Queenstown, County Cork. No further trace, presumed foundered with the loss of all hands.
Juventa	United Kingdom	The barque was wrecked on rocks north of Bermuda. She was on a voyage from Havana, Cuba to Queenstown.
Martha	United Kingdom	The ship was abandoned in the Atlantic Ocean. Her crew were rescued by Francis Carvill (United States). Martha was on a voyage from Glasgow, Renfrewshire to Saint John's, Newfoundland Colony.
Nancy Riley	United Kingdom	The ship was wrecked at Guadeloupe. She was on a voyage from an English port to Guadeloupe.
Orpheus	United States	The ship ran aground in the Nieuwe Diep. She was on a voyage from Baltimore, Maryland to Amsterdam, North Holland, Netherlands.
Sir Ralph Abercrombie	United Kingdom	The ship foundered in the Atlantic Ocean 20 nautical miles (37 km) east of Tristan d'Acunha. Her crew were rescued by the schooner Telegraph ( (United Kingdom of Great Britain and Ireland) Cape Colony). Sir Ralph Abercrombie was on a voyage from London to Yokohama, Japan.
St. Pierre á Caens	Denmark	The schooner was wrecked on the Spital Scar Rocks, near Newbiggin-by-the-Sea, Northumberland, United Kingdom. Her crew were rescued. She was on a voyage from Fredrikstad to Havre de Grâce, Seine-Inférieure, France.
Swift	United Kingdom	The ship departed from Poronal Bay, Prince Edward Island for Liverpool, Lancashire. No further trace, presumed foundered with the loss of all hands.

== 5 December ==
List of shipwrecks: 5 December 1868
Ship	State	Description
Annie Jane	United Kingdom	The fishing sloop collided with the fishing boat Celine (Belgium) and sank 8 nautical miles (15 km) off the Galloper Sandbank. Her crew were rescued by a Russian schooner.
Ariel	United Kingdom	The brigantine was wrecked at Bannow, County Wexford with the loss of all but one of her crew. She was on a voyage from Portmadoc to Waterford.
Castilian	United Kingdom	The ship was driven ashore at Harlech, Caernarfonshire and was wrecked with the loss of three of her 21 crew. Survivors were rescued by the Portmadoc Lifeboat John Ashbury ( Royal National Lifeboat Institution). Castilian was on a voyage form Quebec City, Canada to Liverpool, Lancashire.
City of Boston	United Kingdom	The steamship was driven ashore at Sandy Hook, New Jersey, United States. She was on a voyage from New York, United States to Liverpool. She was refloated and towed back to New York.
Earl	United Kingdom	The brigantine was wrecked in the "Keroe Islands" was the loss of all but one of her seven or eight crew. She was on a voyage from Portmadoc, Caernarfonshire to Waterford.
J. T. A.	United Kingdom	The ship was wrecked on the Langness Peninsula, Isle of Man.
Juventa	United Kingdom	The ship sank off Bermuda. She was on a voyage from Havana, Cuba to Liverpool. She was refloated the next day and taken into St. George's, Bermuda.
Kate Mills	United Kingdom	The ship was driven ashore at Saint Andrews, Fife. She was on a voyage from London to Dundee, Forfarshire.
Thorwaldsen	Flag unknown	The ship ran aground in the Kingroad in a waterlogged condition. She was on a voyage from Quebec City to Bristol, Gloucestershire.
Vaillant	United Kingdom	The ship foundered in the Bristol Channel.
Vision	United Kingdom	The schooner was wrecked at Port St. Mary, Isle of Man. Her five crew were rescued by the Castletown Lifeboat Commercial Traveller ( Royal National Lifeboat Institution). Vision was on a voyage from Drogheda, County Louth to Garston, Lancashire.

== 6 December ==
List of shipwrecks: 6 December 1868
Ship	State	Description
Alarm	United Kingdom	The ship ran aground at Bremen. She was refloated the next day with the assistance of steamships.
Caroline Beeson	United Kingdom	The schooner was driven ashore near Vlissingen, Zeeland, Netherlands.
Eledona	United Kingdom	The schooner was driven ashore near Vlissingen.
Express	United Kingdom	The schooner was run down and sunk off Gibraltar by the steamship Sidon. Her eight crew were rescued by Sidon. Express was on a voyage from Catania, Sicily, Italy to Newcastle upon Tyne, Northumberland.
Fawn	United Kingdom	The smack struck the pier at Ramsgate, Kent and was wrecked with the loss of two of her five crew.
Gamester	United Kingdom	The fishing smack was damaged by fire at West Hartlepool, County Durham.
Nordstjorn	Bremen	The ship was driven ashore near Vlissingen.
North Britain	United Kingdom	The barque was driven ashore and wrecked at Long Rock, Mount's Bay, Cornwall, England with the loss of seven of her nineteen crew. survivors were rescued by the Penzance Lifeboat Richard Lewis ( Royal National Lifeboat Institution). North Britain was on a voyage from Quebec City, Canada to Southampton, Hampshire.
Richard Lewis	Royal National Lifeboat Institution	The Penzance Lifeboat capsized whilst going to the aid of North Britain (United Kingdom. Two of her crew were severely injured.
Stella	United Kingdom	The barque was driven ashore at Ipswich, Suffolk.
Tyne	(United Kingdom of Great Britain and Ireland) New Zealand	The schooner ran aground near the entrance to Wellington Harbour and became a total wreck.
Unnamed	United Kingdom	The fishing smack sank in the River Thames at Barking, Essex with the loss of both crew.
Unnamed	Flag unknown	The barque ran aground on the Goodwin Sands, Kent. She was refloated with the assistance of a lugger and a steamship but found to be severely leaky and was taken in tow for London.
Unnamed	United Kingdom	The schooner ran aground off Ellewoutsdijk, Zeeland.
Unnamed	United Kingdom	The full-rigged ship ran aground and sank off Ellewoutsdijk.

== 7 December ==
List of shipwrecks: 7 December 1868
Ship	State	Description
Annette	Netherlands	The ship was damaged in a gale at Amsterdam, North Holland.
Bootry	Netherlands	The ship was damaged in a gale at Amsterdam.
Caroline Beeson	United Kingdom	The ship was driven ashore. She was on a voyage from Antwerp, Belgium to Swansea, Glamorgan. She was refloated on 13 December and put back to Antwerp.
Catharina	Netherlands	The ship was damaged in a gale at Amsterdam.
Clio	Netherlands	The ship was damaged in a gale at Amsterdam.
Cornelia Catharina	Netherlands	The ship was damaged in a gale at Amsterdam.
Courrier	(France) Saint Pierre	The ship was lost near St. Ann's Head, Pembrokeshire, United Kingdom.
Drie Gesusters	Netherlands	The ship was damaged in a gale at Amsterdam.
Elizabeth	Netherlands	The ship was damaged in a gale at Amsterdam.
Goor Nagtias	Netherlands	The ship was damaged in a gale at Amsterdam.
Henry and Maria	United Kingdom	The fishing smack collided with the barque Jason (Norway) and foundered in the North Sea. Her crew were rescued by Jason.
Isabella Thompson	United Kingdom	The brig was driven ashore at Gloucester, Massachusetts. Her crew were rescued. She was on a voyage from Boston, Massachusetts to Clare, Nova Scotia, Canada.
Jenny Jenkins	United Kingdom	The ship collided with the steamship Lord Raglan and sank in the North Sea off Scarborough, North Riding of Yorkshire with the loss of a crew member. Survivors were rescued by Lord Raglan. Jenny Jenkins was on a voyage from the River Tyne to Exeter, Devon.
Maalstroom	Netherlands	The ship was damaged in a gale at Amsterdam.
Minniehaha	United States	The ship ran aground on the Conch Reef, off the coast of Florida. She was on a voyage from Havana, Cuba to Liverpool, Lancashire, United Kingdom. She was refloated but ran aground again. She was refloated and taken into Key West, Florida on 10 December for repairs.
Potosi	United Kingdom	The ship ran aground at Tome, Japan. She was on a voyage from Tome to Liverpool, Lancashire. She was refloated and resumed her voyage, but sprang a severe leak and had to be beached.
Pride of the Ocean	United Kingdom	The fishing smack foundered in the North Sea with the loss of all hands.
Sarah Ann	Newfoundland Colony	The ship departed from Baltimore, Maryland, United States for Saint John's. No further trace, presumed foundered with the loss of all hands.

== 8 December ==
List of shipwrecks: 8 December 1868
Ship	State	Description
Appearance	United Kingdom	The schooner was wrecked at Sarpsborg, Norway.
Assistant	Netherlands	The schooner was driven ashore at Rotterdam, South Holland.
Chanticleer	United Kingdom	The barque was wrecked on a reef north east of Pemba Island, Zanzibar. She was on a voyage from Bombay, India to Zanzibar.
Clarendon	(United Kingdom of Great Britain and Ireland) New Zealand	The 157-ton brig was deliberately run ashore to the north of Hokitika in order to save the crew when she sprang a leak.
Congress	United Kingdom	The brig was driven ashore at Fleetwood, Lancashire. She was on a voyage from Quebec City, Canada to Fleetwood. She was refloated and towed into Fleetwood.
Express	United Kingdom	The brigantine was run down and sunk in the North Sea 10 nautical miles (19 km) north north east of Flamborough Head, Yorkshire by the steamship Sidon (United Kingdom) with the loss of all hands. She was on a voyage from a port in Sutherland to Newcastle upon Tyne, Northumberland.
Frances and Charlotte	United Kingdom	The ship was wrecked on the Longsand, in the North Sea off the coast of Essex. Her crew survived. She was on a voyage from Sunderland, County Durham to Chichester, Sussex.
John P. Paint	United States	The barque departed from Boston, Massachusetts for Queenstown, County cork, United Kingdom. No further trace, presumed foundered with the loss of all hands.
Malanta	Netherlands	The ship was driven ashore at Rotterdam.
May Flower	United Kingdom	The ship ran aground on the Barber Sand, in the North Sea off the coast of Suffolk. She was on a voyage from London to West Hartlepool, County Durham. She was refloated and assisted into Lowestoft, Suffolk in a severely leaky condition.
Stirling Castle	United Kingdom	The schooner was driven ashore and wrecked near Kinghorn, Fife. Her four crew were rescued. She was on a voyage from Aberdeen to Sunderland.
Voorwarts	Netherlands	The ship ran aground and was wrecked on the Schullhoep, in the North Sea off the Dutch coast. Her crew were rescued. She was on a voyage from St. Ubes, Portugal to Rotterdam. Voorwarts was refloated on 17 December.
Unnamed	Prussia	The ship was wrecked at the entrance to the Bosphorus with the loss of all but one of her crew.

== 9 December ==
List of shipwrecks: 9 December 1868
Ship	State	Description
Adam Wilhelm	Denmark	The ship was driven ashore on Skagen. She was on a voyage from Leith, Lothian, United Kingdom to Copenhagen.
Ann	United Kingdom	The schooner was driven ashore at Harwich, Essex. She was on a voyage from Colchester, Essex to Ipswich, Suffolk. She was refloated the next day and towed into Harwich.
Heilingenhafen	Prussia	The ship was driven ashore on Læsø, Denmark. She was on a voyage from Grangemouth, Stirlingshire, United Kingdom to Kiel. She was later refloated and resumed her voyage.
John Black	United Kingdom	The brigantine was scuttled at Soldier's Point, County Antrim. Her crew were rescued. She had been refloated by 28 December and taken into Warrenpoint, Count Antrim.
Ilma	Sweden	The schooner ran aground on the Trindelen Rock and was abandoned by her crew.
Vectis	United Kingdom	The barque foundered in the Irish Sea with the loss of one of her sixteen crew. Survivors were rescued by the barque Nyanza (United Kingdom). Vectis was on a voyage from Liverpool, Lancashire to Bombay, India.
Voltaic	United Kingdom	The steamship ran aground in the River Foyle. She was on a voyage from Liverpool, Lancashire to Londonderry. She was refloated on 12 December and taken into Londonderry.

== 10 December ==
List of shipwrecks: 10 December 1868
Ship	State	Description
Atalanta	United Kingdom	The schooner ran aground on the Barber Sand, in the North Sea off the coast of Norfolk. She was refloated but was consequently run onto the Outer Bank, off Happisburgh, Norfolk, where she was wrecked. Her eleven crew were rescued by the Happisburgh Lifeboat Huddersfield ( Royal National Lifeboat Institution). Atalanta was on a voyage from London to Hull, Yorkshire.
Catherine and Margaret	United Kingdom	The ship was driven ashore near Beaumaris, Anglesey.
Cham	France	The chasse-marée was wrecked on the Longnose Rock, off Kingsgate, Kent, United Kingdom. Her crew were rescued. She was on a voyage from Saint-Valery-sur-Somme, Somme to Blyth, Northumberland, United Kingdom.
Clyde	United Kingdom	The schooner was wrecked near "Feaghaig", 7 nautical miles (13 km) south of Campbeltown, Argyllshire with the loss of two lives. She was on a voyage from Troon, Ayrshire to Londonderry.
Deborah	United Kingdom	The schooner ran aground at Woodbridge, Suffolk. She was on a voyage from Hull to Woodbridge.
Deerhound	United Kingdom	The schooner ran aground on the Ouze Edge Sand, in the Thames Estuary.
Duxceline	France	The schooner was driven ashore and sank at Margate, Kent, United Kingdom She was on a voyage from Grimsby, Lincolnshire to Gravesend, Kent.
Elizabeth and Mary	United Kingdom	The ship was driven ashore near Beaumaris.
Elizabeth Brown	United Kingdom	The brig ran aground on the Ouze Edge Sand.
Emma	United Kingdom	The ship collided with the paddle steamer Prince Alfred (United Kingdom) and was beached at Carrickfergus, County Antrim. She was on a voyage from Belfast, County Antrim to Workington, Cumberland. She had been refloated by 15 December and taken into Belfast for repairs.
Emerald	United Kingdom	The collier, a brig, collided with the barque Fanny (United Kingdom) and sank in the River Thames at Tilbury, Essex. Her nine crew were rescued. She was on a voyage from South Shields, County Durham to London. Emerald was refloated on 13 January 1869 and towed into London.
Esther	(United Kingdom of Great Britain and Ireland) Jersey	The ship was wrecked on the Holme Sand, in the North Sea off the coast of Suffolk. Her crew survived.
Experiment	United Kingdom	The ship was driven ashore at Par, Cornwall.
Fruiterer	United Kingdom	The steamship ran aground at Lowestoft, Suffolk. She was on a voyage from London to Lowestoft.
Fruit Girl	United Kingdom	The schooner ran aground on the Ouze Edge Sand.
Grance	United Kingdom	The schooner was driven ashore near Margate. She was on a voyage from Middlesbrough, Yorkshire to Boulogne, Pas-de-Calais, France.
Grace Wright	United Kingdom	The schooner was driven ashore and wrecked at Macherioch, Argyllshire. Her crew were rescued. She was on a voyage from Ardrossan, Ayrshire to Killala, County Mayo.
G. T. Ward	United States	The schooner was driven ashore at "Saalze". She was on a voyage from Lübeck to an English port.
Hannah Mary	United Kingdom	The brig was driven ashore and sank at Margate. She was on a voyage from Hartlepool, County Durham to Boulogne.
Hero	United Kingdom	The brigantine was driven ashore at the mouth of the River Dee. She was refloated and assisted into the River Dee by the Point of Ayr Lifeboat.
Heviland	United Kingdom	The ship was driven ashore at Southend-on-Sea, Essex. She was refloated the next day.
Ino, and Ranger	United Kingdom	The lugger Ranger ran into the schooner Ino and was abandoned by her eleven crew, who got on board Ino, which was subsequently abandoned. All sixteen people on board Ino were rescued by the Yarmouth Lifeboat Swift ( Royal National Lifeboat Institution). Ino was on a voyage from South Shields to Taganrog, Russia. She drove ashore at Great Yarmouth, Norfolk and was wrecked. Ranger was subsequently taken into Great Yarmouth by a lifeboat.
Jane	United Kingdom	The ship was driven ashore at St. Ives, Cornwall. She was on a voyage from Newport, Monmouthshire to Hayle, Cornwall. She was refloated and taken into St. Ives.
Lion	United Kingdom	The schooner was driven ashore at Ardrossan, Ayrshire.
Little Gem	United Kingdom	The ship was driven ashore near Beaumaris.
Magdala	Canada	The ship was driven ashore in Loch Boisdale. She was on a voyage from Shediac, Nova Scotia to Dundalk, County Louth, United Kingdom. She was refloated but found to be severely leaky.
Margaret and Ann	United Kingdom	The schooner was wrecked at Warrenpoint, County Antrim with the loss of one of her four crew. She was on a voyage from Cardiff, Glamorgan to Newry, County Antrim.
New Parliament	United Kingdom	The schooner was driven ashore and wrecked at Par.
Reindeer	United Kingdom	The schooner was run down and sunk in the Belfast Lough by the steamship Electric (United Kingdom) with the loss of a crew member. Survivors were rescued by Electric. Reindeer was on a voyage from Ardrossan, Ayrshire to Dublin.
Rose and Mary	United Kingdom	The ship was driven ashore at Cowes, Isle of Wight. She was on a voyage from Portsmouth, Hampshire to Swansea, Glamorgan.
Stirling Castle	United Kingdom	The ship was wrecked on the Vous Rocks, off the coast of Fife. Her crew survived. She was on a voyage from Aberdeen to Sunderland, County Durham.
Tonderghe	United Kingdom	The ship was wrecked on the Isle of Whithorn, Wigtownshire. Her crew were rescued. She was on a voyage from Portwilliam, Wigtownshire to Whitehaven, Cumberland.
William	(United Kingdom of Great Britain and Ireland) Isle of Man	The schooner was driven ashore and wrecked in Ross Bay. Her crew were rescued. She was on a voyage from Liverpool, Lancashire to Douglas.
William	United Kingdom	The ship foundered in the North Sea with the loss of all hands.
William	United Kingdom	The brig was driven ashore and wrecked on Pladda with the loss of four of her five crew. She was on a voyage from Troon to Belfast.

== 11 December ==
List of shipwrecks: 11 December 1868
Ship	State	Description
Ann	United Kingdom	The ship was driven ashore at Moville, County Donegal. She was refloated on 15 December with the assistance of a number of tugs.
Bacabec	United Kingdom	The ship was abandoned in the Atlantic Ocean. Her crew were rescued by Echo (United Kingdom). Bacabec was on a voyage from Saint John, New Brunswick, Canada to Sligo.
Belt	United Kingdom	The ship was driven ashore at Moville. She was on a voyage from Londonderry to Bangor, County Down. She was refloated on 15 December with the assistance of a number of tugs.
City of Hamburg	United Kingdom	The paddle steamer ran aground at Great Yarmouth, Norfolk. She was on a voyage from London to Great Yarmouth. Her passengers were taken off. She was refloated the next day and taken into Great Yarmouth in a leaky condition.
Clyde	United Kingdom	The ship was wrecked at Campbeltown, Argyllshire with the loss of two of her crew. She was on a voyage from Troon, Ayrshire to Londonderry.
Express	United Kingdom	The ship was driven ashore at Appledore, Devon. She was on a voyage from Sydney, New South Wales to Barnstaple, Devon. She was later refloated and taken into Appledore.
Glenharvee	United Kingdom	The ship was driven ashore at Campbeltown with the loss of two of her crew.
Gossamer	United Kingdom	The ship was wrecked at Prawle Point, Devon with the loss of 31 of the 48 people on board.
Herald	United Kingdom	The ship was driven ashore near Bangor, County Down.
Jane	United Kingdom	The brigantine was driven ashore and sank at Ramsey, Isle of Man. Her four crew were rescued by the Ramsey Lifeboat Two Sisters ( Royal National Lifeboat Institution). Jane was on a voyage from Liverpool, Lancashire to Dublin.
Jane	(United Kingdom of Great Britain and Ireland) Isle of Man	The smack was driven ashore and wrecked at Ramsey. Her crew were rescued by the Ramsey Lifeboat Two Sisters ( Royal National Lifeboat Institution). Jane was on a voyage from Ramsey to Whitehaven, Cumberland.
Magnet	United Kingdom	The brig sprang a leak and was abandoned in the North Sea. Her crew were rescued. She was on a voyage from South Shields, County Durham to Hamburg.
Nereid	United Kingdom	The ship foundered. She was on a voyage from Cette, Hérault to Marseille, Bouches-du-Rhône.
Nethania	United Kingdom	The brig was run down and sunk by a schooner off the North Foreland, Kent. Her six crew survived. She was on a voyage from South Shields to Caen, Calvados, France.
Prudence	United Kingdom	The schooner was driven ashore at Ramsey. Her four crew were rescued by the Ramsey Lifeboat Two Sisters ( Royal National Lifeboat Institution).> Prudence was on a voyage from Garston, Lancashire to Aberystwyth, Cardiganshire.
Rehoboth	United Kingdom	The ship sank off Beachy Head, Sussex. Her crew survived. she was on a voyage from Sunderland, County Durham to Lymington, Hampshire.
Seaman	United Kingdom	The ship was driven ashore near Bangor, County Down.
Thames	United Kingdom	The schooner was driven ashore and wrecked at Carnsore, County Wexford with the loss of two of her crew. She was on a voyage from Queenstown, County Cork to Newport, Monmouthshire.
Wasdale	United Kingdom	The brig was run down and sunk off Lamlash, Isle of Arran with the loss of all seven crew. She was on a voyage from Whitehaven to Newport.

== 12 December ==
List of shipwrecks: 12 December 1868
Ship	State	Description
Bangalore	United Kingdom	The ship was driven ashore at Lamlash, Isle of Arran. She was refloated on 14 December and put back to Greenock, Renfrewshire.
Bartolotto	Flag unknown	The ship was driven ashore at "Port Mandri", Greece. She was on a voyage from Bourgas, Ottoman Empire to a British port. She had been refloated by 31 December and taken into Piraeus.
Emily Anne	United Kingdom	The ship was driven ashore at Chapel St Leonards, Lincolnshire. She was on a voyage from London to Newcastle upon Tyne, Northumberland.
Equity	United Kingdom	The smack collided with Queen Victoria (United Kingdom) and sank. Her crew were rescued by Queen Victoria.
Heilingenhafen	Prussia	The schooner was wrecked on "Hatheriff". Her crew were rescued. She was on a voyage from Grangemouth, Stirlingshire, United Kingdom to Kiel.
Hero	United Kingdom	The ship sank in the Irish Sea 2 nautical miles (3.7 km) north west of Puffin Island, Anglesey. Her four crew survived. She was on a voyage from Réunion to Ghent, East Flanders, Belgium.
Liffey	United Kingdom	The ship was driven ashore and wrecked at Portavogie, County Down with the loss of all but her captain. She was on a voyage from Runcorn, Cheshire to Newry, County Antrim.
Nethania	United Kingdom	The brig was run into by a schooner and sank at Broadstairs, Kent. Her crew survived. She was on a voyage from South Shields, County Durham to Caen, Calvados, France.
Rose	United Kingdom	The ship was holed in the River Usk and capsized. She was on a voyage from Newport, Monmouthshire to Weston-super-Mare, Somerset.
Ruby	United Kingdom	The ship sank at Nefyn, Caernarfonshire. Her crew were rescued. She was on a voyage from Great Yarmouth, Norfolk to Liverpool, Lancashire.
Three Janes	United Kingdom	The ship was driven ashore and severely damaged at Douglas, Isle of Man with the loss of six of her crew. She was on a voyage from Preston, Lancashire to Douglas. She was refloated and take into Douglas.

== 13 December ==
List of shipwrecks: 13 December 1868
Ship	State	Description
Dorset	United Kingdom	The ship departed from Port Talbot, Glamorgan for Highbridge, Somerset. No further trace, presumed foundered with the loss of all hands.
Eleanor and Grace	United Kingdom	The ship drove ashore at Milford Haven, Pembrokeshire. She was on a voyage from the River Duddon to Briton Ferry, Glamorgan. She was refloated on 17 December.
Lady Flora Hastings	United Kingdom	The schooner collided with Trossach (United Kingdom) and sank off the Tongue Sand. Her crew survived. She was on a voyage from South Shields, County Durham to Ramsgate, Kent.
Nordstfjernan	Sweden	The barque ran aground off Häfringe Island and was wrecked. Her crew were rescued. She was on a voyage from London, United Kingdom to Stockholm.
Pehr	Norway	The brig was driven ashore at St Mawes Castle, Cornwall, United Kingdom. She was on a voyage from Norway to La Rochelle, Charente-Inférieure, France. She was refloated with the assistance of a steamship and taken into Falmouth, Cornwall.
Unnamed	United Kingdom	The steamship ran aground on the Sizewell Bank, in the North Sea off the coast of Suffolk. The Aldeburgh and Thorpeness Lifeboats Ipswich and Pasco (both Royal National Lifeboat Institution) were launched but found no sign of her.

== 14 December ==
List of shipwrecks: 14 December 1868
Ship	State	Description
Anne Milne	United Kingdom	The steamship was destroyed by fire and sank at Dundee, Forfarshire. She was refloated on 4 January 1869 and taken into Perth.
Beaufeau	France	The brig was wrecked on the Batten Reef, in Plymouth Sound. Her crew were rescued.
Canada	Flag unknown	The barque sank off Bettystown, County Meath. She was on a voyage from Liverpool, Lancashire to Sierra Leone.
Emily Burnyest	United Kingdom	The ship was driven ashore near Trefusis Point, Cornwall. She was refloated with the assistance of a tug.
Helena	United Kingdom	The steamship ran aground on the Doom Bar. She was on a voyage from Cardiff, Glamorgan to Vigo, Spain.
Hound	United Kingdom	The ship was driven ashore on Great Cumbrae, Argyllshire. She was on a voyage from Belfast, County Antrim to Troon, Ayrshire.
Marthe Helene	Norway	The ship was wrecked near Lemvig. She was on a voyage from Leith, Lothian, United Kingdom to Horten.
Orient	United Kingdom	The steamship ran aground at Dragør, Denmark. She was on a voyage from Stettin to Leith. She was refloated and put into Copenhagen, Denmark in a severely leaky condition and was beached there.
Pher	Norway	The brig ran aground at St Mawes Castle, Cornwall. She was refloated and taken into Falmouth, Cornwall.
Providence	United Kingdom	The schooner was driven ashore in Ramsey Bay. She was on a voyage from Garston, Lancashire to Aberystwyth, Cardiganshire.
Sarah Anne	United Kingdom	The brig ran aground and sank at Laugharne, Carmarthenshire with the loss of five of her crew. She was on a voyage from Dieppe, Seine-Inférieure, France to Swansea, Glamorgan.
Vegesack	Bremen	The ship departed from Cardiff for Havana, Cuba. No further trace, presumed foundered with the loss of all hands.
Veteran	United Kingdom	The brigantine was driven ashore on the Isle of Arran. She was on a voyage from Troon to Belfast.
Unnamed	Denmark	The barque was driven ashore and wrecked at Drogheda, County Louth, United Kingdom.

== 15 December ==
List of shipwrecks: 15 December 1868
Ship	State	Description
Advice	Canada	The barque was abandoned in the Atlantic Ocean (50°46′N 21°50′W). Her twelve crew were rescued by the steamship Denmark (United Kingdom). Advice was on a voyage from Antwerp, Belgium to Saint John, New Brunswick.
Architect	United Kingdom	The barque was abandoned in the Atlantic Ocean. Her crew were rescued. Her crew were rescued by Claribel (United Kingdom). Architect was on a voyage from Quebec City, Canada to an English port. She came ashore at Hillswick, Shetland Islands on 3 February 1869.
Cavoda	United Kingdom	The barque was wrecked near Drogheda, County Louth with the loss of all hands. She was on a voyage from Liverpool, Lancashire to Sierra Leone.
Eclipse	United Kingdom	The ship was driven ashore at Arichat, Nova Scotia, Canada. She was on a voyage from Digby, Nova Scotia to the Clyde.
Fancy	United Kingdom	The ship was driven ashore and wrecked at Silivri, Ottoman Empire. Her crew were rescued. She was on a voyage from Berdyansk, Russia to a British port.
Fides	United States	The ship was driven ashore on Vlieland, Friesland, Netherlands. She was on a voyage from New York to Bremen.
Grace	United Kingdom	The schooner sank at Margate, Kent. Her crew were rescued by the Broadstairs Lifeboat Bulmer White ( Royal National Lifeboat Institution). Grace was on a voyage from Middlesbrough, Yorkshire to Boulogne, Pas-de-Calais, France. She was refloated on 16 December and taken into Margate.
Happy Return	United Kingdom	The ship foundered in the North Sea. She was on a voyage from Nairn to Cromarty.
Hooyland	United Kingdom	The barque was driven ashore and wrecked at Kilmore, County Wexford with the loss of a crew member. She was on a voyage from Surinam to Glasgow, Renfrewshire.
Royal Dane	United Kingdom	The ship ran aground near Seraglio Point, Ottoman Empire. She was on a voyage from Taganrog, Russia to a British port. She was refloated and subsequently resumed her voyage.
Royal Tar	United Kingdom	The ship foundered in the North Sea 12 nautical miles (22 km) off the mouth of the Humber. Her crew were rescued by the steamship Rouen (France). Royal Tar was on a voyage from Shoreham-by-Sea, Sussex to Goole, Yorkshire.
Tyne	United Kingdom	The barque was wrecked on Marmara Island, Ottoman Empire. Her crew were rescued. She was on a voyage from Constantinople to Enos, Ottoman Empire.
Wilhelmine	Flag unknown	The ship capsized in the Black Sea at the entrance to the Bosphorus. She was on a voyage from Galaţi, Ottoman Empire to a British port.
Unnamed	United Kingdom	The brig foundered off the Copeland Islands, County Antrim with the loss of several of her crew. She was on a voyage from Maryport, Cumberland to Belfast, County Antrim.

== 16 December ==
List of shipwrecks: 16 December 1868
Ship	State	Description
Clyde	Canada	The brigantine was abandoned in the Atlantic Ocean. Her crew were rescued by Alma (United Kingdom). Clyde was on a voyage from Verte Bay, Nova Scotia to Belfast, County Antrim, United Kingdom.
Elizabeth Mary	United Kingdom	The schooner was driven onto the Naylor Rock, Margate, Kent. She was on a voyage from London to Antwerp, Belgium. She was refloated the next day and taken into Margate.
Jane	United Kingdom	The ship sank in Angle Bay. She was refloated on 30 December and taken into Milford Haven, Pembrokeshire where she was condemned.

== 17 December ==
List of shipwrecks: 17 December 1868
Ship	State	Description
Daisy	United Kingdom	The smack was run into by the steamship Don Pedro (Spain) and sank at Grimsby, Lincolnshire. She was raised on 19 December and taken into Grimsby.
Forester	United Kingdom	The ship ran aground on the Lee Flat, in the Suriname River. She was on a voyage from the Clyde to Pernambuco, Brazil.
Lucien	United Kingdom	The ship ran aground on the Myfor Bank. She was on a voyage from Buenos Aires, Argentina to London. She was refloated and taken into Falmouth, Cornwall in a leaky condition.
Millbank	United Kingdom	The steamship ran aground at Penarth, Glamorgan. She was on a voyage from Newport, Monmouthshire to Penarth.
Pet	United Kingdom	The schooner struck rocks in East Tarbert Bay and sank. Her crew survived. She was on a voyage from Liverpool, Lancashire to São Miguel Island, Azores.
Preciosa	Sweden	The schooner was wrecked south of Egersund, Norway with the loss of a crew member. She was on a voyage from Gothenburg to an English port.
John Wesley	United Kingdom	The schooner was driven ashore and wrecked in Lough Swilly. Her crew were rescued. She was on a voyage from Aberystwyth, Cardiganshire to Galway. She was refloated on 22 December.
The Beal	United Kingdom	The brig ran aground on the Horse Rock, in the North Sea off the coast of Yorkshire and was wrecked. Her crew were rescued. She was on a voyage from Middlesbrough, Yorkshire to London.

== 18 December ==
List of shipwrecks: 18 December 1868
Ship	State	Description
Callioup (or Galicub), and Charkeich (or Sharkie)	Ottoman Empire	The steamships collided in the Black Sea at "Carabournon". Callioup sank with the loss of 50 of the 165 people on board. She was on a voyage from Alexandria, Egypt to Constantinople. Charkeich was consequently beached at Çeşme
Chevy Chase	United Kingdom	The steamship ran aground on the Scheelhoek, off the coast of Zeeland, Netherlands.
Dunsundie	United Kingdom	The ship strurck a sunken rock and was damaged. She was on a voyage from "Burraira" to Hull, Yorkshire. She put into Gibraltar in a leaky condition
Helen	United Kingdom	The schooner was driven ashore at Whitburn, County Durham.
Henrietta Brewis	United Kingdom	The brig was abandoned in the Atlantic Ocean (44°45′N 40°09′W). Her crew were rescued by the barque Sharston (United Kingdom). Henrietta Brewis was on a voyage from Swansea, Glamorgan to Bahia, Brazil.
L'Auguste	France	The lugger was lost on this date. Her crew were rescued by Noera (United Kingdom).
Livonia	Italy	The ship ran aground and was damaged at Arbroath, Forfarshire, United Kingdom.
Lucien	United Kingdom	The brig was driven onto the Mylor Bank, in the English Channel off the coast of Cornwall. She was on a voyage from Buenos Aires, Argentina to London. She was refloated and taken into Falmouth, Cornwall in a leaky condition.

== 19 December ==
List of shipwrecks: 19 December 1868
Ship	State	Description
Earl of Elgin, and Thames	United Kingdom	The steamship Earl of Elgin collided with the steamship Thames in the River Thames and was beached at Tilburyness, Essex. She was on a voyage from Sunderland, County Durham to London. She was refloated on 21 December and taken into London. Thames sank at Northfleet, Kent. She was on a voyage from Grangemouth, Stirlingshire to London. She was refloated.
Hannah and Jane	United Kingdom	The brigantine was driven ashore at Blakeney, Norfolk. She was refloated on 22 December and taken into Blakeney.
Henrietta	United Kingdom	The ship sprang a leak and was run ashore near Beaumaris, Anglesey.
Oernen	Denmark	The schooner was abandoned in the North Sea. Her crew were rescued by the schooner Otto (Denmark). Oernen was on a voyage from Leith, Lothian, United Kingdom to Ebeltoft.

== 20 December ==
List of shipwrecks: 20 December 1868
Ship	State	Description
Alarm	United Kingdom	The ship ran aground on the Zuidwal, in the Wadden Sea. She was on a voyage from Bremen to Cardiff, Glamorgan.
Florence	United Kingdom	The schooner was driven ashore at Charlestown, Cornwall.
Harkaway	United Kingdom	The ship departed from The Downs for the Canary Islands. No further trace, presumed foundered with the loss of all hands.
Mary Ann	United Kingdom	The brig was driven ashore and wrecked at Souter Point, Northumberland. Her crew were rescued. She was on a voyage from Rouen, Seine-Inférieure, France to the River Tyne.
Villafranca	France	The lugger was wrecked on Havre de Pas, Jersey, Channel Islands with the loss of two of her three crew. The survivor was rescued by the tug Toby ( (United Kingdom of Great Britain and Ireland) Jersey). Villafranca was on a voyage from Dinan, Côtes-du-Nord to Saint-Malo, Ille-et-Vilaine.

== 21 December ==
List of shipwrecks: 21 December 1868
Ship	State	Description
Adventure	United Kingdom	The brig was wrecked at Pakefield, Suffolk. Her crew survived. She was on a voyage from Sunderland, County Durham to a port in Mayenne, France.
Catherine	United Kingdom	The ship was driven ashore in Loch Ryan and was abandoned by her crew. She was on a voyage from Troon, Ayrshire to Larne, County Antrim. She subsequently floated off and drove out to sea.
Commerce	United Kingdom	The schooner was driven ashore at Blyth, Northumberland with the loss of a crew member. She was on a voyage from Gravesend, Kent to Blyth.
Electric	Hamburg	The medium clipper was driven ashore at Great Egg Harbor, New Jersey, United States. Her 350 passengers were taken off. She was on a voyage from Hamburg to New York, United States. She was subsequently refloated, towed to New York, repaired and returned to service.
Ellen	United Kingdom	The ship struck a sunken wreck off Race's Shoal, in the North Sea and sank. Her crew were rescued. She was on a voyage from Whitby, Yorkshire to Rouen, Seine-Inférieure, France.
Estrella	United Kingdom	The ship was wrecked on the Roques Reefs. All on board survived on an uninhabited island 6 nautical miles (11 km) from the wreck. They were rescued on 27 December by Bolivar (Bolivarian Navy of Venezuela). Estrella was on a voyage from Saint Thomas, Virgin Islands to Curaçao.
Favourite	United Kingdom	The ship was wrecked on the Newcombe Sand, in the North Sea off the coast of Suffolk. Her crew survived. She was on a voyage from Blyth, Northumberland to Boulogne, Pas-de-Calais, France.
Hamilton	United Kingdom	The ship was driven ashore at Sea Palling, Norfolk. She was on a voyage from Hull, Yorkshire to London. She was refloated and resumed her voyage.
Harriet	United Kingdom	The ship ran aground at "Portmacksand", Wigtownshire. She was on a voyage from Maryport, Cumberland to Barsalloch, Wigtownshire. She was refloated but drove ashore near Garliestown and was wrecked.
Helen	United Kingdom	The schooner struck a sunken rock and foundered 3 nautical miles (5.6 km) south west of the Dudgeon Lightship ( Trinity House), in the North Sea. Her crew got on board the lightship. They were rescued on 23 December by the steamship Resolute (United Kingdom). Helen was on a voyage from Newcastle upon Tyne, Northumberland to Rouen.
Kinloss	United Kingdom	The schooner was wrecked in the North Sea near Muchalls, Kincardineshire, Scotland, with the loss of one of her five crew. She was on a voyage from Sunderland to Aberdeen.
Peter Fordeskjold	Denmark	The barque ran aground on the Hittarp Reef. She was on a voyage from an English port to Copenhagen.
Starry Banner	United States	The steamship was reported to have foundered in the Atlantic Ocean 700 nautical miles (1,300 km) west of Ireland (island) with the loss of 122 of the 164 people on board. Survivors were reported to have been rescued by a French barque and having been landed at Boulogne, Pas-de-Calais, France. She was reported to have been on a voyage from New York City to Alexandria, Egypt. However, the story was believed to be a hoax, with no vessel of that name listed in American Lloyd's Register and no accounts from survivors forthcoming from Boulogne.
Weardale	United Kingdom	The brig ran aground on the Maplin Sand, in the North Sea off the coast of Essex.

== 22 December ==
List of shipwrecks: 22 December 1868
Ship	State	Description
Active, and Brothers	United Kingdom	The schooner Active collided with Brothers in the River Usk. Both vessels were beached. Brothers was on a voyage from Newport, Monmouthshire to Cardiff, Glamorgan.
Jackal	United Kingdom	The ship struck a rock off Newbiggin-by-the-Sea, Northumberland and was damaged. She was on a voyage from Leith, Lothian to Newcastle upon Tyne, Northumberland. She completed her voyage in a leaky condition.
Mary	United Kingdom	The ship foundered in the North Sea off Cromer, Norfolk. Her crew were rescued by Cornish Diamond (United Kingdom). Mary was on a voyage from Hartlepool, County Durham to Trouville-sur-Mer, Calvados, France.
Pioneer	United Kingdom	The schooner collided with the steamship Kinghorn (United Kingdom) and was abandoned in the North Sea. Her five crew were rescued by Kinghorn and the Caister Lifeboat. Pioneer was on a voyage from Torquay, Devon to South Shields, County Durham.
Sacra Famiglia	Italy	The ship was wrecked near Messina, Sicily. She was on a voyage from Catania, Sicily to Marseille, Bouches-du-Rhône, France.
Southern Empire	United Kingdom	The ship foundered in the Atlantic Ocean. Her crew were rescued by Hermione (United Kingdom) and the brig Johann Amelia (Portugal). Southern Empire was on a voyage from New Orleans, Louisiana, United States to Liverpool, Lancashire.

== 23 December ==
List of shipwrecks: 23 December 1868
Ship	State	Description
Adele	Bremen	The ship was destroyed by fire in the Indian Ocean. Those on board took to four boats. One boat with nine people on board reached land, five people in another boat were rescued by Frederick (United States). Those in the other two boats were reported missing. Adele was on a voyage from Bremen to a port in Aracan, Burma.
Helen	United Kingdom	The schooner foundered in the North Sea off the Dudgeon Sand. Her crew were rescued. She was on a voyage from South Shields, County Durham to Rouen, Seine-Inférieure, France.

== 24 December ==
List of shipwrecks: 24 December 1868
Ship	State	Description
Adsey	United Kingdom	The ship was driven ashore at the Landguard Fort, Felixtowe, Suffolk. She was refloated and taken into Harwich, Essex.
Alderman	United Kingdom	The brig was run into by the steamship Valetta (United Kingdom) and sank off Orfordness, Suffolk. Her crew were rescued by Valetta. Alderman was on a voyage from Sunderland, County Durham to London.
Alexander	United Kingdom	The ship struck a wreck in the Sunk Channel and was damaged. She was on a voyage from South Shields, County Durham to Rouen, Seine-Inférieure, France. She put into Lowestoft, Suffolk.
Castle	United Kingdom	The smack was abandoned off Aberystwyth, Cardiganshire. Her nine crew were rescued by the Aberystwyth Lifeboat Evelyn Wood ( Royal National Lifeboat Institution). Castle was on a voyage from Kingstown, County Dublin to Aberystwyth. She came ashore and was wrecked.
Diamond and Fuchsia	United Kingdom	The collier Fuchsia, a brig, was run into by John and Mary (United Kingdom) off Aldeburgh, Suffolk and was abandoned by her crew, who reached shore in their boat. Fuchsia was on a voyage from Hartlepool, County Durham to London. She subsequently collided with the schooner Diamond (United Kingdom, which was abandoned by her three crew; they got on board Fuchsia, which was driven ashore at Aldeburgh, Suffolk. Those on board were rescued by the Aldeburgh Lifeboat Pasco ( Royal National Lifeboat Institution). Diamond was on a voyage from Goole, Yorkshire to London.< She was subsequently taken into Lowestoft, Suffolk in a derelict condition by the smacks Secret and Vesper (both United Kingdom).
Isabella	United Kingdom	The brig ran aground off Pakefield, Suffolk. She was on a voyage from Sunderland, County Durham to London. She was refloated and taken into Lowestoft in a sinking condition.
Jeune Adolphe	France	The ship was driven ashore at Blakeney, Norfolk, United Kingdom. Her crew were rescued.
Julia	United Kingdom	The ship ran aground in Aberlady Bay. She sank the next day and was abandoned by her crew. She was on a voyage from Cockenzie, Lothian to Pont-Audemer, Eure, France.
Saucy Lass	United Kingdom	The ship collided with Merton (United Kingdom) and sank off the Cork Sand, in the North Sea off the coast of Suffolk with the loss of two of her crew. Survivors were rescued by Merton.

== 25 December ==
List of shipwrecks: 25 December 1868
Ship	State	Description
Anne Catherine	United Kingdom	The ship was driven ashore on "Hatteriff". She was on a voyage from Newcastle upon Tyne, Northumberland to Nyborg, Denmark.
Annie	United Kingdom	The ship was driven ashore in the Channel Islands. She was on a voyage from London to Cardiff, Glamorgan. She was refloated and put into Cowes, Isle of Wight in a leak condition.
Australian	United Kingdom	The steamship ran aground 2 nautical miles (3.7 km) from Norfolk, Virginia, United States. She was on a voyage from Mobile, Alabama to Liverpool, Lancashire. She was refloated on 27 December and taken into Norfolk.
Chebucto	United Kingdom	The barque was wrecked in Annotto Bay, Jamaica. Her crew were rescued.
Cuthebert	United Kingdom	The ship foundered in the Atlantic Ocean. All 40 people on board were rescued by the barque America (United States). Cuthbert was on a voyage from Quebec City, Canada to Liverpool.
Sophie	United Kingdom	The ship foundered 2 nautical miles (3.7 km) off the Saltee Islands, County Wexford. Her crew were rescued. She was on a voyage from Troon, Ayrshire to Waterford.
Thomas Gillespie	United Kingdom	The steamship was driven ashore and wrecked 17 nautical miles (31 km) south west of Cape Spartel, Morocco with the loss of three of her crew. She was on a voyage from Newcastle upon Tyne, Northumberland to Genoa and Naples, Italy.

== 26 December ==
List of shipwrecks: 26 December 1868
Ship	State	Description
Ardwell	United Kingdom	The full-rigged ship was driven ashore and wrecked north of Zandvoort, North Holland, Netherlands. Her crew were rescued. She was on a voyage from South Shields, County Durham to Zierikzee, North Holland.
Cacique	French Navy	The convict hulk sank at Cayenne, French Guiana with the loss of several lives.
Florence Nightingale	United Kingdom	The barque was wrecked off the coast of Africa with the loss of a crew member. She was on a voyage from Bathurst, Gambia Colony and Protectorate to Sierra Leone. The nineteen survivors reached the "Isle des Los" in a raft, from whence they were rescued by the whaler S. A. Paine (United States).
Ida	United Kingdom	The ship collided with the brig Topsy (United Kingdom) and sank at Deal, Kent.
Isabella	United Kingdom	The schooner was wrecked on the Gunfleet Sand, in the North Sea off the coast of Suffolk. Her five crew were rescued by the steamship Thames (United Kingdom). Isabella was on a voyage from Sunderland, County Durham to Maldon, Essex.
Jane	United Kingdom	The schooner was wrecked on the Gunfleet Sand. Her crew were rescued. She was on a voyage from Sunderland, County Durham to Margate, Kent.
Malvina	United Kingdom	The ship was run into by the steamship Falcon (Bremen) and was beached on the Maplin Sand, in the North Sea off the coast of Essex. She was later refloated with the assistance of six smacks and was towed into London.
Maggie Lorimer	United Kingdom	The ship sank at Dunkirk, Nord, France. She was on a voyage from Glasgow, Renfrewshire to Dunkirk.
Marsden	United Kingdom	The brig ran aground on the Whiting Sand, in the North Sea off the coast of Suffolk. Her crew were rescued. She was on a voyage from Sunderland to London. She was refloated and taken into Harwich, Essex in a leaky condition.
Mohawk	Canada	The brig ran aground at the entrance to the Strangford Lough. She was on a voyage from Troon, Ayrshire, United Kingdom to Cuba. She was refloated and taken into Ballyhenry, County Antrim, United Kingdom.
Nancy	United Kingdom	The brigantine was wrecked on the Longsand, in the North Sea off the coast of Essex. Her crew were rescued. She was on a voyage from Sunderland to Southampton, Hampshire.
Orient	United Kingdom	The brig ran aground and sank on the Gunfleet Sand. Her crew were rescued by the schooner Hope (United Kingdom). Orient was on a voyage from South Shields, County Durham to London.
Portia	United Kingdom	The ship sprang a leak and was beached at Lowestoft, Suffolk. She was on a voyage from Hartlepool, County Durham to Boulogne, Pas-de-Calais, France.
Sarah Nicholson	United Kingdom	The ship ran aground in the Eastern Passage. She was on a voyage from London to Shanghai, China. She was refloated and resumed her voyage.
Sisters	United Kingdom	The brig was wrecked on the Gunfleet Sand. Her crew were rescued by the brig Triune (United Kingdom). Sisters was on a voyage from South Shields to London.
Speculation	United Kingdom	The ship ran aground and sank off Aldeburgh, Suffolk. Her crew were rescued by the smacks New Unity and Snowdrop (United Kingdom). Speculation was on a voyage from Hartlepool to London.
Springflower	United Kingdom	The ship departed from South Shields for London. No further trace, presumed foundered with the loss of all hands.
Standering, or Stanislaus	United Kingdom	The brig was wrecked on the Gunfleet Sand. Her nine crew were rescued by the steamship Thames (United Kingdom).
Traveller	United Kingdom	The brig ran aground on the Gunfleet sand, floated off and sank. Her crew were rescued by the brig Nexo (Denmark). Traveller was on a voyage from South Shields to London.
Victoire Eugène	France	The ship departed from Casablanca, Morocco for Ipswich, Suffolk. No further trace, presumed foundered with the loss of all hands.
No. 9	United Kingdom	The pilot boat was run down and severely damaged by the steamship RMS China (United Kingdom) with the loss of two lives. Twelve people were rescued by China. No. 9 was taken into Liverpool.
Ballywalter Lifeboat	United Kingdom	The lifeboat capsized in the Belfast Lough with the loss of a crew member. Survivors were rescued by the Coastguard.

== 27 December ==
List of shipwrecks: 27 December 1868
Ship	State	Description
Baltic	United Kingdom	The ship was wrecked on the Gunfleet Sand, in the North Sea off the coast of Suffolk. Her crew were rescued. She was on a voyage from West Hartlepool, County Durham to London.
Bride's Maid	(United Kingdom of Great Britain and Ireland) Jersey	The schooner was driven ashore and damaged at Trouville-sur-Mer, France. She was on a voyage from Cardiff, Glamorgan to Trouville.
Cabot, and Flying Cloud	United Kingdom	The barque Cabot was driven into the brig Flying Cloud at Plymouth, Devon. Both vessels were driven on to the Batten Reef and were wrecked. Cabot was on a voyage from Gothenburg, Sweden to Bristol, Gloucestershire. She was refloated the next day and taken into Sutton Harbour. Flying Cloud was on a voyage from Pernambuco, Brazil to Leith, Lothian. Her ten crew were rescued by the Plymouth Lifeboat.
Captain Manby	France	The lifeboat capsized whilst going to the aid of Only Son (United Kingdom) at Boulogne, Pas-de-Calais with the loss of two or five of her ten crew.
China	United Kingdom	The barque was abandoned in the Atlantic Ocean with the loss of nine of her fifteen crew. Survivors were rescued by W. H. Jenkins (United Kingdom). China was on a voyage from Quebec City, Canada to Cardiff, Glamorgan.
Concord	United Kingdom	The ship was driven ashore at Bowmore, Islay. Her crew survived. She was on a voyage from Galway to Maryport, Cumberland.
George	United Kingdom	The ship ran aground on the Knock Sand and was abandoned. Her crew were rescued. She was on a voyage from Seaham, County Durham to London.
Hitena	United Kingdom	The brigantine was abandoned in the English Channel off the coast of Sussex. Her crew were rescued by the Worthing Lifeboat Jane ( Royal National Lifeboat Institution). Hitena was subsequently taken into Shoreham-by-Sea, Sussex.
Miranda	United Kingdom	The brig was wrecked on the Gunfleet Sand. Her crew were rescued by the steamship Iona (United Kingdom). Miranda was on a voyage from Blakeney, Norfolk to London.
Okeanos	United Kingdom	The brig ran aground on the Sizewell Bank, in the North Sea off the coast of Suffolk. She was on a voyage from Newcastle upon Tyne, Northumberland to Rouen, Seine-Inférieure. She floated off and sank. Her seven crew were rescued by the smack Four Brothers (United Kingdom).
Only Son	United Kingdom	The collier, a schooner, was driven ashore at Boulogne. Her seven crew were rescued by rocket apparatus. She was on a voyage from Inverkeithing, Fife to Dieppe, Seine-Inférieure, France.
Queen of Britain	United Kingdom	The ship ran aground on the Girdler Sand, in the Thames Estuary. She was on a voyage from Demerara, British Guiana to London. She was refloated and towed into London.
Shepherdess	United Kingdom	The brig ran aground on the Maplin Sand, in the North Sea off the coast of Essex. Her crew were rescued by the steamship Hamburg (United Kingdom).
Triune	United Kingdom	The brig ran aground and was wrecked on the Cork Sand, in the North Sea off the coast of Essex. All on board were rescued by Volunteer (United Kingdom). Triune was on a voyage from South Shields, County Durham to London.
Violette	United Kingdom	The barque capsized in the River Mersey. All ten crew were rescued by the gig Kate, the tug Speedwell (both United Kingdom), and the Liverpool Lifeboat Liverpool No. 1 ( Royal National Lifeboat Institution). Violette was on a voyage from Liverpool, Lancashire to Runcorn, Cheshire. She was righted on 1 January 1869 and taken into Liverpool.
Wanderer	United Kingdom	The ship ran aground on Meyer's Ledge, in the North Sea. She was on a voyage from the Firth of Forth to Brake, Prussia.
Waterloo	United Kingdom	The barque collided with a Dutch brig and caught fire off the east coast of Kent. She ran onto the Goodwin Sands and sank. Her crew survived. She was on a voyage from Livorno, Italy to Hull, Yorkshire.
Unnamed	United Kingdom	The lighter struck rocks at Kilcreggan, Argyllshire and sank. Her crew were rescued. She was on a voyage from Ballachulish, Inverness-shire to Glasgow, Renfrewshire.

== 28 December ==
List of shipwrecks: 28 December 1868
Ship	State	Description
Arlington	United Kingdom	The ship was driven ashore at Nelson Point, Glamorgan. She was on a voyage from Saint John, New Brunswick, Canada to Bristol, Gloucestershire. She was later refloated and resumed her voyage.
Bilbao	United Kingdom	The brig ran aground on Scroby Sands, Norfolk. Her crew were rescued by the Great Yarmouth Lifeboat. She was refloated the next day and taken into Great Yarmouth in a leaky condition.
Castle Eden	United Kingdom	The ship was driven ashore at Rangoon, Burma. She was refloated.
Catherina	United Kingdom	The schooner sprang a leak and foundered in the North Sea 50 nautical miles (93 km) off Lowestoft, Suffolk. Her crew were rescued by the fishing smack Fox (United Kingdom). Catherina was on a voyage from Cardiff, Glamorgan to South Shields, County Durham.
Dugueschin	United Kingdom	The ship was driven ashore on the coast of Zeeland, Netherlands. She was on a voyage from Antwerp, Belgium to Sunderland, County Durham.
Hedwig	Flag unknown	The ship was driven ashore near Geestendorf.
Home	United Kingdom	The brig was towed into A Coruña, Spain by the steamship Luxor (United Kingdom), being in a sinking condition.
Horace	United Kingdom	The brig foundered in the North Sea with the loss of all hands.
Jesse	United Kingdom	The Thames barge was abandoned in the Thames Estuary off Faversham, Kent. Her crew were rescued. She was on a voyage from Gravesend to Murston, Kent.
Leopard	United Kingdom	The barque was driven ashore and wrecked at Westward Ho!, Devon. Her crew were rescued by Hope ( Royal National Lifeboat Institution) with the loss of a crewman from the lifeboat. Leopard was on a voyage from Sombrero, Antigua to Gloucester.
Marie	United Kingdom	The ship sank at Glückstadt, Prussia. She was on a voyage from Grangemouth, Stirlingshire to Flensburg, Prussia.
Moonbeam	United States	The ship was driven ashore near Geestendorf.
Morice	United Kingdom	The ship was driven ashore at Terneuzen, Zeeland. She was on a voyage from Antwerp to Newcastle upon Tyne, Northumberland.
Ocean Gem	United Kingdom	The barque ran aground on the Kaloot Bank, in the North Sea off the coast of Zeeland. She was on a voyage from Antwerp to Sunderland. She was refloated on 28 January 1869 and taken into Terneuzen, Zeeland.
Pace	Austria-Hungary	The barque was wrecked in Bideford Bay with the loss of four of her fourteen crew. Survivors were rescued by the Bideford Lifeboat Hope ( Royal National Lifeboat Institution). Pace was on a voyage from Glasgow, Renfrewshire, United Kingdom to Venice. She was refloated on 19 May 1869 and beached.
Princess	United Kingdom	The ship was driven ashore at Ainsdale, Lancashire. Her crew were rescued.

== 29 December ==
List of shipwrecks: 29 December 1868
Ship	State	Description
Carnatic	United Kingdom	The ship was abandoned at sea. Her crew were rescued by the brig Archimedes (Italy). Carnatic was on a voyage from Sunderland, County Durham to Cartagena, Spain.
Crossfell	United Kingdom	The full-rigged ship was wrecked on the Shipwash Sand, in the North Sea off the coast of Suffolk. Her crew were rescued by the schooner Albion ( (United Kingdom of Great Britain and Ireland) Guernsey). Crossfell was on a voyage from London to South Shields, County Durham.
George Bennett	United Kingdom	The brigantine was abandoned off the coast of Essex. Her crew were rescued by the smack Mystery (United Kingdom).
Josephine	United Kingdom	The ship struc the pier at Ramsgate, Kent. She was holed by her anchor and sank. She was on a voyage from Sunderland, County Durham to Le Tréport, Seine-Inférieure, France.
Maria Elizabeth	Danzig	The ship was driven ashore and wrecked on Euboea, Greece with the loss of all hands.
Provident	United Kingdom	The ship ran aground on the Wolves Rock and was abandoned by her crew. Her crew were rescued. She was on a voyage from Bristol, Gloucestershire to Swansea, Glamorgan. She was refloated and towed into Cardiff, Glamorgan in a severely leaky condition.
Syrian	United Kingdom	The steamship ran aground off Tarifa, Spain. She was refloated and put back to Gibraltar, but sprang a severe leak the next day. She was taken in tow by HMS Crocodile (Royal Navy). The tow was passed to HMS Warrior (Royal Navy) on 31 December.
Victoria	United Kingdom	The brig ran aground on Scroby Sands, Norfolk. Her crew were rescued by the Gorleston Lifeboat. She was refloated and taken into Great Yarmouth, where she sank.

== 30 December ==
List of shipwrecks: 30 December 1868
Ship	State	Description
Brunette	United Kingdom	The ship ran aground on the Longsand, in the North Sea off the coast of Essex. She was on a voyage from South Shields, County Durham to Saint-Nazaire, Loire-Inférieure, France. She was refloated with the assistance of two smacks and put into Harwich, Essex.
Loire et Bretagne	France	The steamship collided with a fishing smack at Great Yarmouth, Norfolk, United Kingdom and was beached.
Venus	Hamburg	The schooner was driven ashore and wrecked at Wyk auf Föhr, Prussia. She was on a voyage from Hamburg to Ipswich, Suffolk, United Kingdom.

== 31 December ==
List of shipwrecks: 31 December 1868
Ship	State	Description
Anna Maria	Italy	The brig collided with the barque Biaggo Asserto (Italy) off Gibraltar. She was taken in tow by the tugs Belge, Jackal and Lion (all United Kingdom) and beached at Gibraltar. Anna Maria was on a voyage from Genoa to Buenos Aires, Argentina.
Ellen	United Kingdom	The ship was lost near Ringkøbing, Denmark. She was on a voyage from Bayonne, Basses-Pyrénées, France to Hamburg.
Hope	United Kingdom	The barque was towed into Gibraltar in a derelict condition. She was on a voyage from Newport, Monmouthshire to Martinique.

== Unknown date ==
List of shipwrecks: Unknown date December 1868
Ship	State	Description
Aden	United Kingdom	The ship was reported missing, presumed foundered with the loss of all hands.
Americana	United Kingdom	The ship was taken into Dingle Bay in a derelict condition.
Annetta	United Kingdom	The barque was lost near Swatow, China before 4 December.
Annetta	Norway	The barque foundered. Some of her crew were rescued.
Argo	Flag unknown	The ship was wrecked at Visby, Sweden before 8 December.
Argos Nicholaos	Greece	The ship was wrecked at Media, Algeria before 24 December.
Bonne Amelie	France	The full-rigged ship was wrecked off Cabo de Santa Maria, Portugal with the loss of all on board. She was on a voyage from Bordeaux, Gironde, France to Buenos Aires, Argentina.
Charlotte Ann	United Kingdom	The ship was driven ashore. She was on a voyage from Liverpool to Danzig. She was refloated and put into Gothenburg, Sweden in a leaky condition.
Chiozza	Flag unknown	The ship foundered in the Black Sea.
Cocomandel	United Kingdom	The ship was destroyed by fire near Batavia, Netherlands East Indies. She was on a voyage from South Shields, County Durham to Swatow, China.
Cœur de Lion	France	The ship was wrecked at Bordeaux, Gironde before 29 December.
Constance	United Kingdom	The barque capsized at Taganrog, Russia. Her crew were rescued by the steamship Theban (United Kingdom).
Dorritt	United Kingdom	The steamship foundered in the Bristol Channel. She was on a voyage from Bridgwater, Somerset to a Welsh port.
Emily McNear	United States	The ship was wrecked on Mackay's Shoals, in the Bahamas. She was on a voyage from Boston, Massachusetts to Mobile, Alabama.
Ernst Reinhardt	Stettin	The ship was run down and sunk by Dionne (United Kingdom). Her crew were rescued by Dionne. Ernst Reinhardt was on a voyage from Sunderland, County Durham, United Kingdom to Stettin.
Finke Senior	United States	The ship was driven ashore at Thomas Point, Maryland. She was on a voyage from Rio de Janeiro, Brazil to Baltimore, Maryland.
Frederica Wilhelm	United Kingdom	The ship was wrecked near Chefoo, China.
Gleaner	(United Kingdom of Great Britain and Ireland) Guernsey	The ship was wrecked at São Miguel Island, Azores.
Gloria	United Kingdom	The barque was abandoned in the Atlantic Ocean before 5 December. She was subsequently towed into L'Orient, Morbihan, France.
Harmony	United Kingdom	The ship was wrecked at Rose Blanche, Newfoundland Colony. She was on a voyage from Cádiz, Spain to La Poile, Newfoundland Colony.
Henriette	United Kingdom	The brig was abandoned in the Atlantic Ocean before 13 December.
Hill	(Russian Empire) Grand Duchy of Finland	The barque was lost at the entrance to the Bosphorus.
Hope	United Kingdom	The ship sprang a leak and was abandoned 25 nautical miles (46 km) west northwest of Cape St. Vincent, Portugal. Her eighteen crew were rescued by the steamship Memnon (United Kingdom). Hope was on a voyage from Newport, Monmouthshire to Martinique. She was towed into Gibraltar by Memnon.
Hound	United Kingdom	The schooner sank in the Belfast Lough off Donaghadee, County Down. She was on a voyage from Belfast, County Antrim to Maryport, Cumberland.
James S. Ayer	United States	The fishing schooner was lost on the Grand Banks. Lost with all 12 hands.
Jane Ann Marsh	Canada	The schooner was wrecked in Lake Ontario. Her seven crew were rescued.
Josephine Nichols	United Kingdom	The ship was wrecked on the Mosquito Coast.
Kitty	United Kingdom	The schooner departed from Lowestoft, Suffolk for Barking, Essex. Subsequently reported missing.
Lise Amelie	Flag unknown	The ship foundered off the coast of Uruguay with loss of life.
Maria	United Kingdom	The ship was lost off the coast of the Newfoundland Colony. Her crew were rescued. She was on a voyage from Quebec City, Canada to Portmadoc, Caernarfonshire.
Mercur	Norway	The ship capsized at Taganrog.
Mile	United Kingdom	The ship was wrecked at Gabarus, Nova Scotia, Canada before 26 December. She was on a voyage from Sydney, Nova Scotia to Boston, Massachusetts.
Myrtle	United Kingdom	The ship sank off Burial Island, in the Belfast Lough.
Rebecca Laind	United Kingdom	The ship collided with a steamship and sank off Seville, Spain.
Reinhardt	Flag unknown	The ship was wrecked in the Rio Grande. She was on a voyage from Montevideo, Uruguay to Antwerp, Belgium.
Sardis	United Kingdom	The steamship was run down and sunk off Cape Spartel, Algeria by the steamship Thetis (United Kingdom). Her crew were rescued by Thetis. Sardis was on a voyage from Smyrna, Ottoman Empire to London.
St. Anna	United Kingdom	The ship was wrecked. It was on a voyage from Odesa, Russia to a British port.
Thomas	United Kingdom	The schooner was wrecked at Carnsore Point, County Wexford with the loss of two of her crew.
Unione D	Flag unknown	The ship was driven ashore near Porthcawl, Glamorgan, United Kingdom on or before 10 December. She was on a voyage from Cardiff to Trieste.
William Edward	United Kingdom	The ship was wrecked in Hardman Bay with the loss of all hands.
William Taylor	United Kingdom	The steamship was wrecked at Lândana, Portuguese Angola before 6 December.
