= Anatetarte =

Town of ancient Caria

Anatetarte (Ancient Greek: Ἀνατετάρτη) or Anotetarte (Ἀνωτετάρτη) was a town of ancient Caria. It became a bishopric; no longer the seat of a residential bishop, it remains a titular see of the Roman Catholic Church.

Its site is unlocated.
