= Cidramus =

Town of ancient Phrygia and later of Caria

Coordinates: 37°20′43″N 29°06′52″E

Cidramus or Kidramos, also known as Kidrama, was a town of ancient Phrygia and later of Caria, inhabited in Roman and Byzantine times. It became a bishopric; no longer the seat of a residential bishop, it remains a titular see of the Roman Catholic Church. The town issued coins with the legend ΚΙΔΡΑΜΗΝΩΝ.

Its site is located near Yorga in Asiatic Turkey.
