= Aurokra =

Town of ancient Phrygia

Coordinates: 38°31′55″N 31°11′56″E

Aurokra or Aurokla or Aurocla or Aulokra was a town of ancient Phrygia, inhabited during Roman and Byzantine times. It became a bishopric; no longer a residential bishopric, it remains, under the name Aurocla, a titular see of the Roman Catholic Church.

Its site is located above Dort Köy near Doğancık in Asiatic Turkey.
