= Hermopolis Parva =

Hermopolis Parva was the Greek name for two cities in ancient Egypt:

- Damanhur, the capital of the 7th nome of Lower Egypt
- Hermopolis Parva (Tehut) or Ba'h, the capital of the 15th nome of Lower Egypt, the present El-Baqliya
