= Ecdaumava =

Disused Roman town

Coordinates: 38°37′22″N 32°33′00″E

Ecdaumava or Ekdaumaua (Greek: Έκδαύμαυα), also known as Egdava and Gdanmaa (Greek: Γδανμάα), was a town of ancient Lycaonia, inhabited in Roman and Byzantine times. It became a bishopric; no longer the seat of a residential bishop, it remains a titular see of the Roman Catholic Church.

Its site is located near Çeşmelisebil, Sarayönü, Konya Province, Turkey, 85 km (53 mi) north of Konya at the foot of a chain of low hills running north–south. The site is specifically on a hill east of Çeşmelisebil and was once the richest find site of Christian inscriptions in Lycaonia, but today there are relatively few remains including ancient and Byzantine spolia. There are also inscriptions at Kuyulusebil, 4 km (2.5 mi) north of Çeşmelisebil.

According to the Tabula Peutingeriana, Gdanmaa lay on the more northerly of the ancient routes crossing through Lycaonia from northwest to southeast, between Vetisso and Pegella. There may have also been a north–south route passing through the town, branching off from the main Ankyra-Ikonion road and leading to Laodicea Combusta. Gdanmaa was still described as a chorion through post-Constantine times. The First Council of Nicaea in 325 contains the first reference to Gdanmaa as a bishopric: its bishop (a suffragan of Ankyra) was listed among the participants. At the Council of Chalcedon in 451 it was listed as a suffragan of Ikonion and was represented by the metropolitan.

In later periods the bishopric is given the alternate name of Eudoxias or Eudokias, which exclusively appears in later periods. The change of name indicates that the seat of the bishopric had shifted to the better-protected location of Eudokias. Eudokias's location is unknown but it must be one of the fortified places of northern Lycaonia, perhaps at Karanlı Kale north of Yeniceoba. Eudokias was also the seat of a bandon and topoteresia, which was transferred into the new tourma of Kommata, in the theme of Cappadocia under Leon VI.
