= Anineta =

Town of ancient Lydia or of Caria

Coordinates: 37°56′00″N 28°26′37″E

Anineta, also known as Aninetum or Anineton (Ancient Greek: Ἀνίνητον), was a town of ancient Lydia or of Caria, and later of the Roman, and Byzantine empires, located in modern Turkey, the site of an ancient bishopric in (the Roman province of Asia) and was an important site early in christianity. Anineta remains today a titular see of the Roman Catholic Church in the ecclesiastical province of Ephesus. In addition it minted coins bearing the legend Ἀνινησίων.

Its site is located near Bögdelik in Asiatic Turkey.

== Bishopric ==
The Diocese of Anineta (Dioecesis Aninetensis) is a suppressed and titular see of the Roman Catholic Church in the Roman province of Asia. It was part of the Patriarchate of Constantinople and was suffragan of the Archdiocese of Ephesus.

The first bishop mentioned by any historical sources is Hermogene. the martyrology indicates he was a martyr and disciple of St. Paul.

Another two bishops of Anineta, are Teodoro who participated in the Ecumenical Council of Ephesus (431) and Mamas participated in the Council of Chalcedon (451). Today Anineta survives as a titular bishopric and the seat is vacant.

== Bishops ==
- Hermogenes
- Teodoro (fl 431AD)
- Mamas (or Modesto) (fl 451AD )
- Paweł Latusek (13 November 1961 – 16 February 1973)
