= Tityassus =

Town of ancient Isauria

Coordinates: 37°42′01″N 31°24′05″E

Tityassus or Tityassos was a town of ancient Isauria and of Pisidia, inhabited in Hellenistic and Roman times. It became a bishopric, however it is no longer the seat of a residential bishop. It remains a titular see of the Roman Catholic Church.

Its site is located near Yenişarbademli (Bademli), Asiatic Turkey.
