= Colybrassus =

City in Cilicia Tracheia

Coordinates: 36°43′54″N 31°58′31″E

Colybrassus or Kolybrassos (Ancient Greek: Κολυβρασσός; Armenian: Surp Sope) was a city in Cilicia Tracheia (modern-day Turkey) that belonged to the Roman province of Pamphylia Prima, identified as such by Ptolemy.

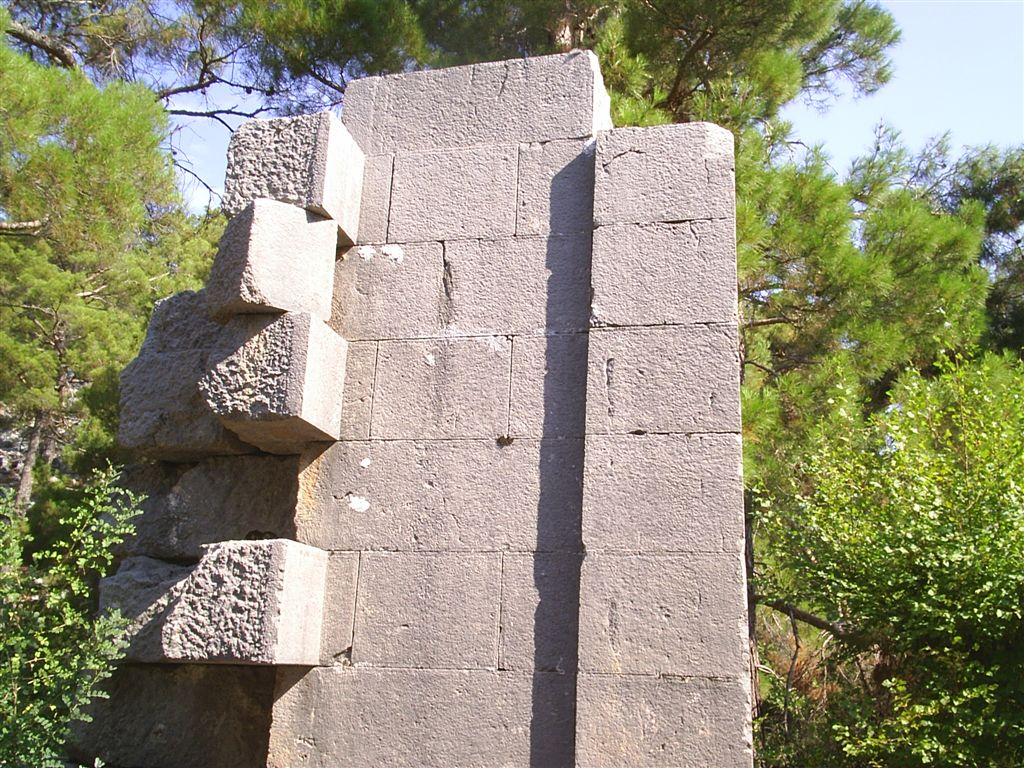
Colybrassus: Remains of a temple

== Remains ==
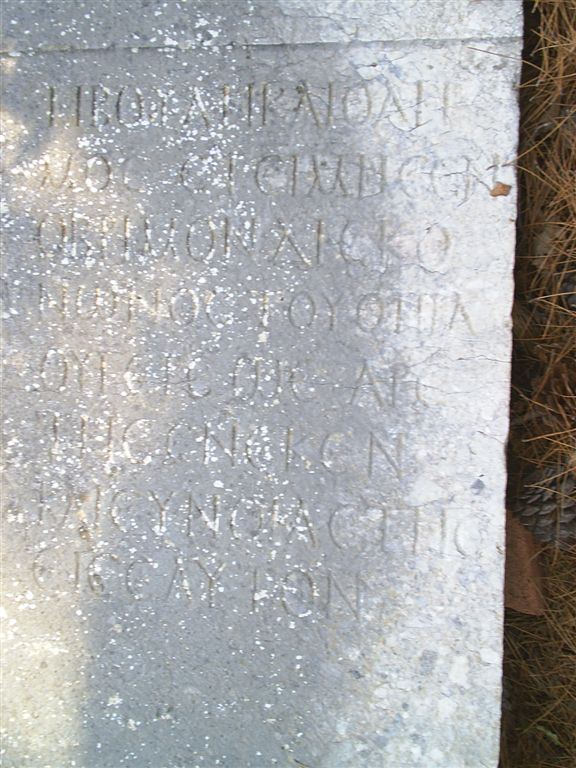
Greek inscription at Colybrassus

Inscriptions found on the site show that it was located at present-day Ayasofya on the Susuz Dağ, some 20 kilometres (12 mi) northeast of Alanya, at 1,000 metres (3,300 ft) above sea level.

The remains include the walls of a temple of Hercules that rise to 25 feet and the 20-foot walls of another unidentified temple, and a small theatre or odeion. Part of the city wall is preserved, with steps leading to the up to its gate, and in what was the necropolis there are several sarcophagi and a tomb cut in the rock.

== History ==
Cited by the geographer Ptolemy as an important city center, in 113 BC, in Roman times housed the Legio Pontica. In Byzantine times it was the seat of a bishopric and the patron saint of the city took the name of Άγια Σοφία (Hagia Sophia). After the collapse of the Byzantine power in Anatolia in 1199, the city became part of the possessions of the Armenian prince Kervard with the name of "Surp Sope". The name was derived directly from the Armenian church dedicated to St. Sophia. After that date the city disappears from history.

== Bishopric ==
The bishopric of Colybrassus was a suffragan of the metropolitan see of Side, the capital of the Roman province of Pamphylia Prima. Of its bishops, Longinus was at the First Council of Constantinople in 381, Nessius at the Council of Ephesus in 431, and Tates at the Trullan Council of 692.

No longer a residential bishopric, Colybrassus is today listed by the Catholic Church as a titular see.

== Bibliography ==
- TIB 8: Hansgerd Hellenkemper and Friedrich Hild, "Lykien und Pamphylien", 2004, ISBN 3-7001-3280-8
