= Valentinianensis =

Valentiniana also known as Valentinianen(sis) is a titular see (diocese) of the Roman Catholic Church in the province of Byzacena, North Africa. Very little is known of the bishopric. The seat of the bishop is not identified and only three bishops are known.

- Rogatianus attended the Council of Carthage (484), and then exiled by the Vandal King, Huneric
- Charles Richard Mulrooney (24 Feb 1959 appointed – 5 Aug 1989 died)
- Philip Pargeter (20 Nov 1989 appointed – )
