= Nea Aule =

Town in Anatolia

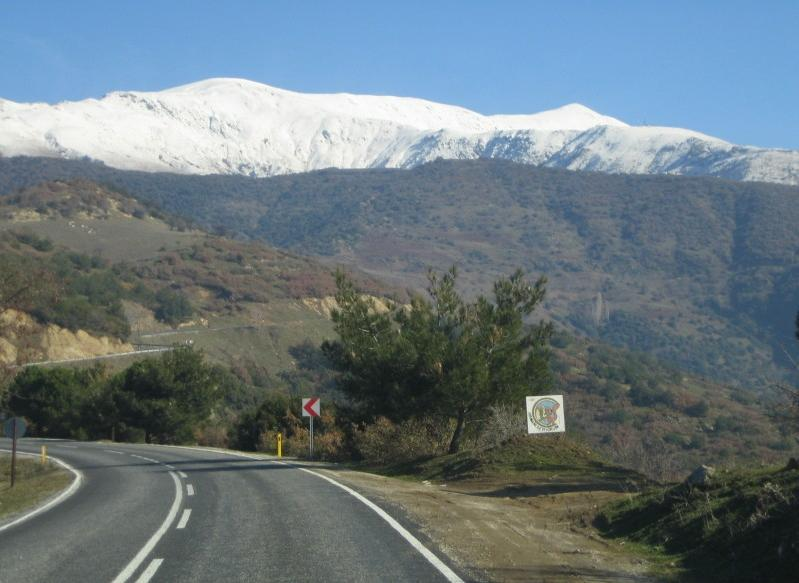
the area around Nea Aule.

Nea Aule was a town situated in a glen of Mount Tmolus in Anatolia (modern Turkey).

It was within the Roman province of Asia Prima according to the Notitiae Episcopatuum cited by Ramsay and others.

In Die Orientalischen Religionen im Römerreich, Rudolf Fellmann mentions a relief, from Nea Aule, of the god Sabazios as a god of vegetation, which he says is now in Alaşehir, which the index of the book seems to identify with Nea Aule, but which others identify as the ancient Philadelphia in Lydia.

The Barrington Atlas of the Greek and Roman World distinguishes Nea Aule from Philadelphia (Alaşehir), saying only that it was in the same region and was also called Theodosiopolis.

== History ==
Nea Aule was founded in Roman times.

A bishop of Nea Aule named Philippus was at the Council of Chalcedon in 451. In the Greek manuscripts of the acts of the council, he is given simply as of Nea Aule. The Latin manuscripts add that Nea Aule was also known as Theodosiopolis. This identification is accepted by the Barrington Atlas.

No longer a residential bishopric, Nea Aule is today listed by the Catholic Church as a titular see of the province of Asia Prima, whose capital and metropolitan see was Ephesus.
