= Hermocapelia =

Town of ancient Lydia

Coordinates: 38°55′18″N 27°36′54″E

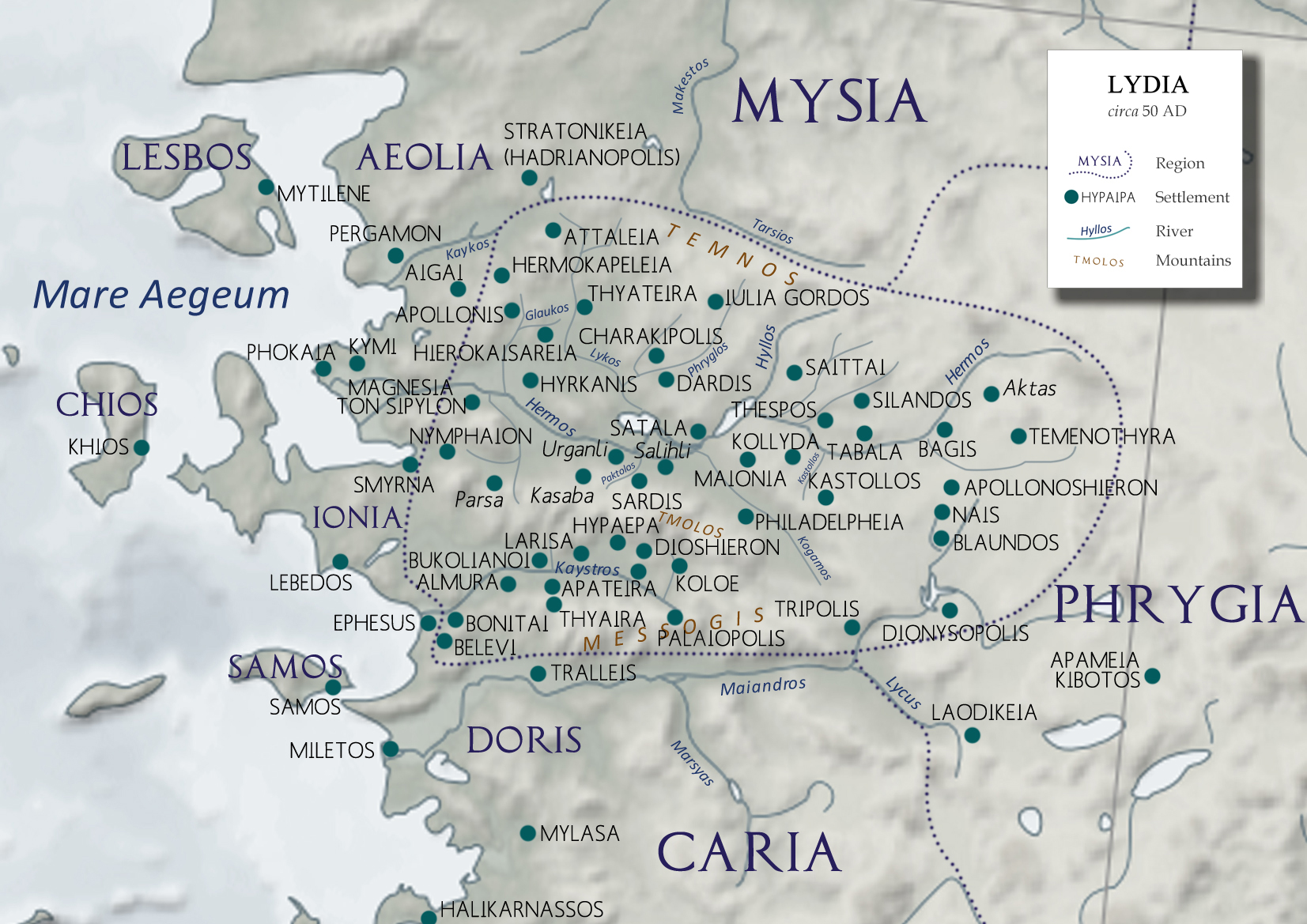
Lydia in about 50 CE.

Hermocapelia or Hermokapeleia, also possibly known as Thyessos, was a town of ancient Lydia. It was inhabited from Classical through Byzantine times. It stood on the Hermus River, "to the west of Apollonis in its own little plain almost completely surrounded by mountains."

It was mentioned by Pliny the Elder and Hierocles but is best known for its coins which it minted, and which are in existence today.

The city was the site of an ancient bishopric which remains a vacant titular see to this day.

Its site is located in Sakarkaya, Akhisar, south of Suleymanköy in Asiatic Turkey.
