= Sybrita =

Ancient Cretan town

Coordinates: 35°15′29″N 24°38′21″E

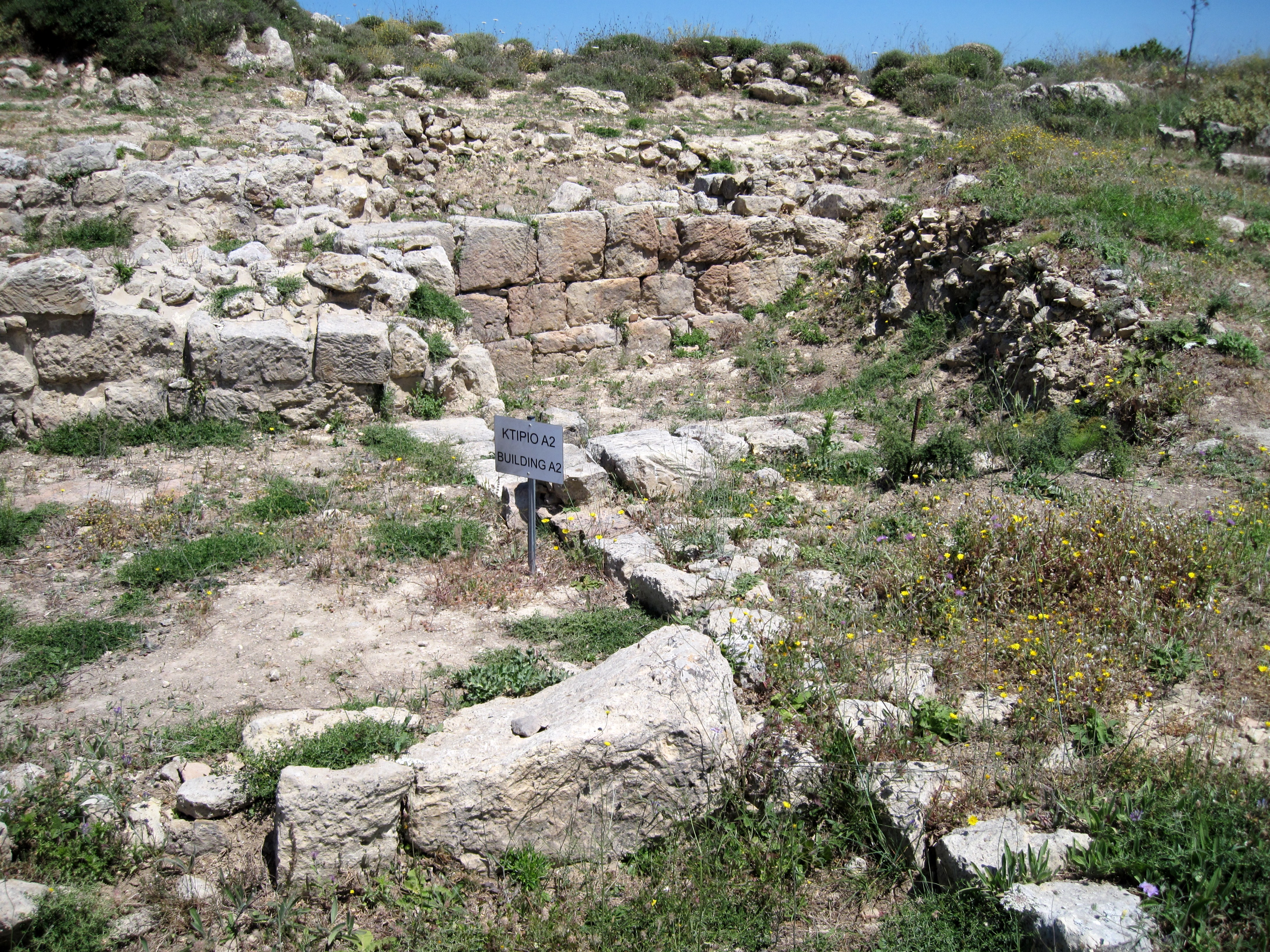
View of the archaeological site of Sybrita.

Sybrita (Ancient Greek: Σύβριτα), or Subrita or Soubrita (Σούβριτα), or Subritus or Soubritos (Σούβριτος), or Sibyrtus or Sibyrtos (Σίβυρτος), was a town of ancient Crete, 8 M. P. from Eleutherna, and famous for its numerous and beautiful silver coins, which, though some of them belong to a very early period, are fine specimens of a Cretan mint; the types are always connected with the worship of Dionysus or Hermes.

It was the seat of a bishop; no longer a residential bishop, under the name Subrita it remains a titular see of the Roman Catholic Church.

The site of Sybrita is located near modern Thronos.
