= Rhandus =

The diocese of Rhandus is a titular see of the Roman Catholic Church in the Roman province of Mesopotamia. The bishopric was centered on the town of Tur Abdin (in southeast Turkey) and was subordinate to Dara.

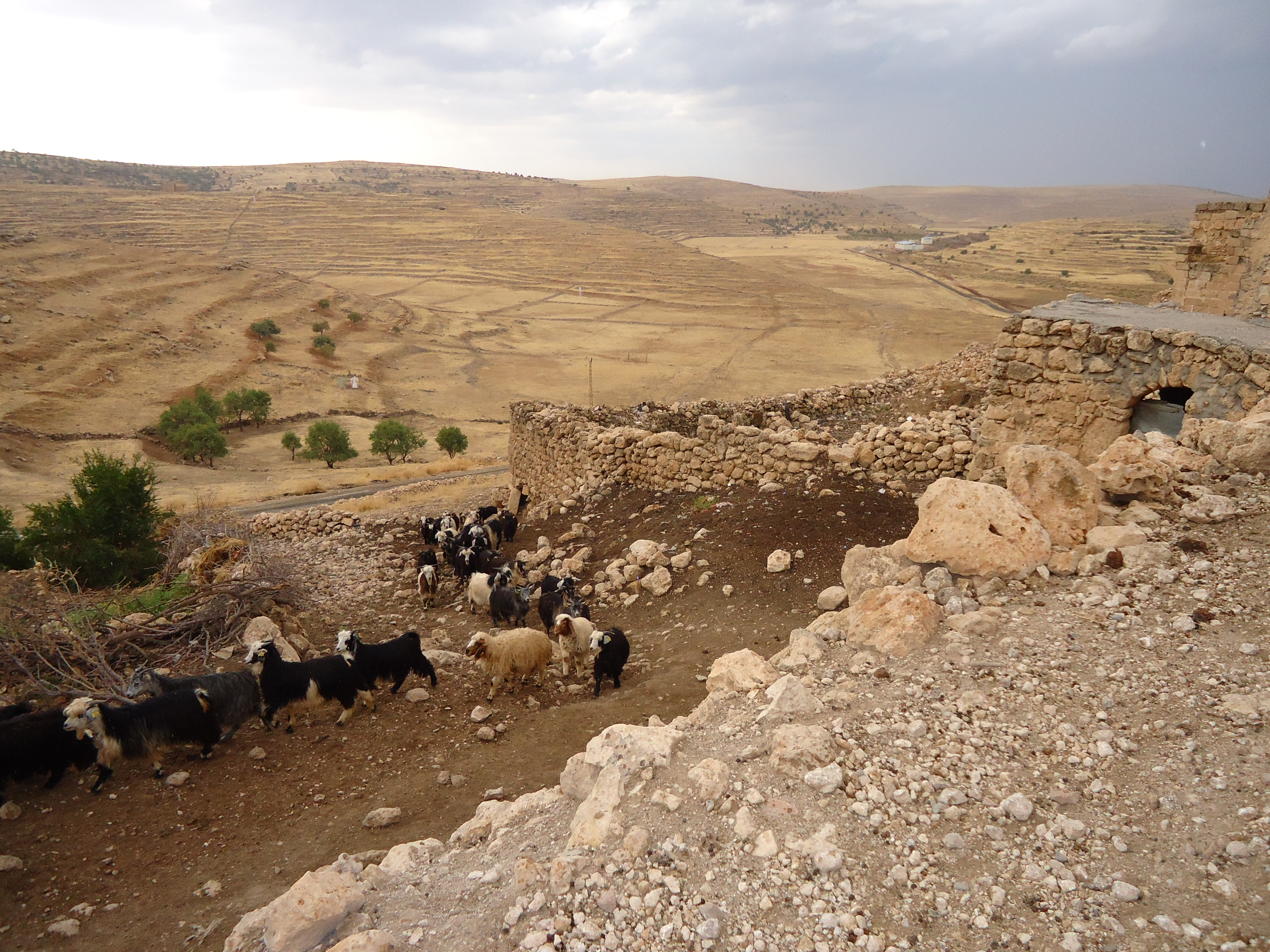
Modern Tur Abdin area.

The history of the Bishopric goes back to earliest episcopal activity in Roman Mesopotamia. Although Catholic interests are no longer active in the area, the Syriac Orthodox Church maintains churches and a number of Monasteries there.

== List of Bishops ==
- Juan Niccolai OFM Coadjutor Bishop of Tarija ( Bolivia ) February 20, 1944 August 16, 1947
- António Ferreira Gomes Coadjutor Bishop of Portalegre ( Portugal ) January 15, 1948 July 6, 1949
- Wilhelm Weskamm Auxiliary Bishop in Paderborn ( Germany ) October 12, 1949 June 4, 1951
- Paul-Léon-Jean Chevalier Auxiliary Bishop of Le Mans ( France ) August 21, 1951 May 4, 1959
- January Wawrzyniec Kulik Auxiliary Bishop of Łódź ( Poland ) July 15, 1959 October 27, 1995
