= Philadelphia (Cilicia) =

Town of ancient Cilicia

Coordinates: 36°37′22″N 33°01′30″E

Philadelphia or Philadelpheia (Ancient Greek: Φιλαδέλφεια), was a town of ancient Cilicia, and later of Isauria. It was located in the interior of Cilicia Aspera, on the river Calycadnus, above Aphrodisias. It became an episcopal see; no longer the site of a residential bishop, it remains under the name Philadelphia Minor, a titular see of the Roman Catholic Church.

Its site is tentatively located near İmşi Ören in Karaman Province, Turkey.
