= Mossyna =

Ancient Phrygian city

Coordinates: 38°05′44″N 29°17′55″E

Mossyna (Ancient Greek: Μοσσύνα) or Mosyna (Μοσύνα) was a city of the middle Maeander valley in the late Roman province Phrygia Pacatiana II. It is mentioned as a bishopric by Hierocles and other ecclesiastical writers. It may have been named for the classical Mossynoeci, or for the Greek word for a wooden tower (Μοσσύν).

Mossyna became a Byzantine bishopric, located between Dionysopolis and Laodikeia, and is included in the Catholic Church's list of titular sees.

Its site is 6 kilometres (3.7 mi) northeast of Çal, in Denizli Province, Turkey.
