= Marciana (Lycia) =

Titular see in Turkey

Marciana was a town in ancient Lycia, with a bishopric that was a suffragan of that of Myra.

The author of the article in the 1910 Catholic Encyclopedia used the spelling Marciane.

The town is not mentioned by any author and its exact location remains unknown, but the see figures in the Notitiae episcopatuum from the 6th to the 12th or 13th century.

== Bishops ==
Le Quien (Oriens christianus, I, 983) cites three bishops:

- Januarius, who attended in 448 the Council of Constantinople against Eutyches;
- Augustine, who signed in 459 the synodal decree of Gennadius of Constantinople against simoniacs;
- Marcian, who signed in 518 the decretal letter of the Council of Constantinople against Severus and other heretics and the report to Pope Hormisdas on the ordination of Patriarch Epiphanius of Constantinople.
