= Thermae Basilicae =

Thermae Basilicae was a town in the Roman province of Cappadocia Prima. Accordingly, its bishopric, which is included in the Catholic Church's list of titular sees, was a suffragan of Caesarea in Cappadocia, the capital of the province.

== Description ==
The town is mentioned as Therma by Hierocles (Synecdemus, 699, 2) and is quite probably to be identified with Aquae Sarvenae, which the Tabula Peutingeriana places on the road between Tavium and Caesarea, and with Sarvena, a city described on an inscription and by Ptolemy (V, 6, 12). This would be today Terzili Hammam, a village about 60 miles north of Caesarea, where there are hot mineral sulphur waters, still frequented. A part of the building containing the baths is of Roman construction; a Christian inscription has been found thereon.

Down to the 13th century, the Notitiae episcopatuum describe the see as the first suffragan of Caesarea. Perhaps there was a bishop from the time of St. Basil; in any case four others are mentioned: Firminus, present at the Council of Chalcedon, 451; Photinus, at a Council of Constantinople in 459; Musonius, exiled by Justin I, about 518; Theodore, present at the Sixth Ecumenical Council of Constantinople, 681, and at the Council in Trullo, 692.
