= Podalia (Lycia) =

Town of ancient Lycia

Coordinates: 36.6741°N 30.0364°E

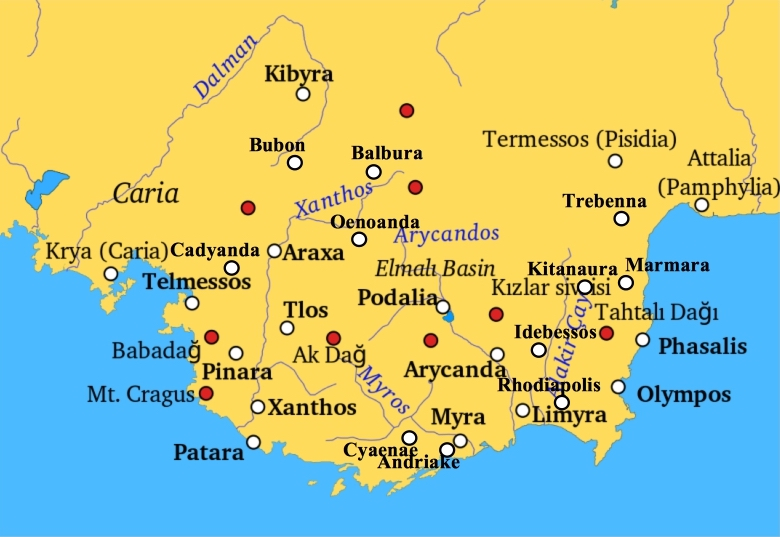
Cities of ancient Lycia

Podalia (Ancient Greek: Ποδαλία), also spelled Podalaea or Podalaia (Ποδαλαία), Podallia (Ποδαλλία), and Podaleia (Ποδάλεια), was a town of ancient Lycia, mentioned by several ancient authors.

== Name ==
Although this town in Lycia appeared in Smith's Dictionary of Greek and Roman Geography (1854) under the name Podalaea, the more recent Princeton Encyclopedia of Classical Sites (1976) calls it Podalia. The form "Podalia" is also what appears in the 1902 edition of the Encyclopædia Britannica, and is used by David Cunliffe Pointer.

The city is called Podalia in Pliny the Elder's Natural History, in Hierocles's Synecdemus, and in the Notitiae Episcopatuum.

== Site ==
Smith reported the theory of Charles Fellows that the site of Podalia was at Eskihisar (Turkish for "old town"), near Almalec, where there are remains of ancient Cyclopean town walls and rock tombs; but the Princeton Encyclopedia dismisses that theory, and another that would place Podalia at Armutlu, as lacking evidence. A better theory, it holds, is that the town was situated at a place still called Podalia or Podamia on a hill at the northwest corner of the Avlan Gölü lake, 16 km south of Elmali. It sees as even more likely, and indeed almost certain, a site at Söğle, where there are remains of a large town for which no other identification is possible, since the only other candidate would be Choma, now positively identified with Hacimusalar, southwest of Elmali.

== History ==
Inscriptions show that, in the 2nd century AD, Podalia received benefits from Opramoas of Rhodiapolis and that it honoured Jason of Kyaneai. The very few coins of Podalia that have been found of the time of Gordian III (238–244).

== Bishopric ==
Podalia became a Christian bishopric, a suffragan of the metropolitan see of Mira, the capital of the Roman province of Lycia. Its bishop Callinicus took part in the First Council of Constantinople (381). Aquilinus was one of the signatories of the letter that in 458 the bishops of Lycia sent to Byzantine Emperor Leo I the Thracian concerning the murder of Proterius of Alexandria. A bishop named Ioannes was at a synod called by Menas of Constantinople in 536. Another Ioannes was at the Photian Council of Constantinople (879).

No longer a residential bishopric, Podalia is today listed by the Catholic Church as a titular see.
