= Tymandus =

Roman and Byzantine-era city in northern Pisidia

Coordinates: 38.104°N 30.607°E

Tymandus or Tymandos (Ancient Greek: Τύμανδος) also known as Mandos, Mandas Kiri, or Yassi Veran, was a Roman and Byzantine-era city in northern Pisidia (now southern Turkey). A number of monuments from Roman times remain in the area.

== Description ==
Tymandus was located in the northern part of the region and Roman province of Pisidia, between Philomelion and Sozopolis (Apollonia). The site is identified with the modern town of Yassıören north of Isparta and near Lake Eğirdir. The city was located on a broad flood plain running east into Lake Eğirdir. During the 3rd century the residents of Tymandus asked the Roman Emperor for municipal status; their request was granted, as recorded in both an inscription in Tymandus, and an epistle of the emperor, possibly Diocletian. The city was granted rights to elect magistrates, aediles, and quaestors. and establish a town council with 50 members(Decurions) and city hall, and to pass ordinances.

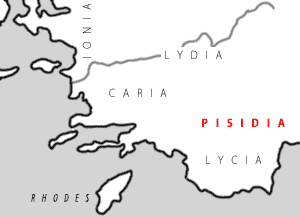
Pisidia

Bownmann and Garnsey have argued that Tymandus was actually a village, not a town and that the granting of municipal status was unusual. They argue the wording of the grant is for the granting of municipal status rather than being an actual city. Levick, however, argues that Tymandus had in the 2nd century been a mere village, but by the time of the municipal grant had grown significantly, so that the grant merely reflected a recognition of this change. Pont has postulated that the granting of the municipal status was to placate a particularly vocal community.

Pisidia was an early center of Christianity, and located in the ecclesiastical province of Antioch. Known bishops of the see include Longinus of Tymandus, and Callinicus of Tymandus in Pisidia, who appeared at the First Council of Constantinople. The bishopric remains a vacant titular see in the Roman Catholic Church.
