= Lupadium =

Graeco-Roman town of ancient Mysia

Coordinates: 40°12′14″N 28°26′02″E

Lupadium or Loupadion (Ancient Greek: Λουπαδιόν) was a Graeco-Roman town of ancient Mysia. It minted coins during the Byzantine period. It was a bishopric; no longer the seat a residential bishop, it remains a titular see of the Roman Catholic Church.

== Location ==
Its site is located near Uluabat in Asiatic Turkey.
