= Metropolis in Asia =

Ancient city

Metropolis in Asia is both a Roman era city and a vacant titular see located in the ecumenical Province of Asia, in what is today Tratsa, Turkey (near Tatarlı) and Haydarlı

== City ==
Province of Asia

The colonia (Roman city), also called Pisidian Nikopolis, had its own Geurisia Council and at times minted its own coins.

It is probable that Metropolis was founded as a Hellenistic colony, as many names on inscriptions in the city have Macedonian names. The City was mentioned by Livy and Strabo.

== Bishopric ==
=== Ancient bishopric ===
- Polycarp, Bishop of Pisidian Metropolis.
- Eustathius
- Heorticius, attendee at the Council of Chalcedon
- Monophilus mentioned in a Synod
- John attendee at a Synod in Constantinople.

=== Titular Catholic bishops ===
- Charles de Rousseau † (4 Dec 1606 Appointed – 26 Jun 1608)
- Giovanni Ponzi † (18 May 1894 Appointed – 18 Mar 1895)
- Joseph-Claude Excoffier (30 Mar 1895 Appointed – 3 May 1923)
- Jean-Marie Jan (15 Jan 1924 Appointed – 4 Feb 1929)
- Cyril Rudolph Jarre (18 May 1929 Appointed – 11 Apr 1946)
- Jan van Cauwelaert (6 Jan 1954 Appointed – 10 Nov 1959)
- Fernand-Pierre-Robert Bézac des Martinies † (16 Jan 1961 Appointed – 25 Mar 1963)
- Juan de Dios López de Victoria † (1 Aug 1963 Appointed – 29 Aug 1992)
