= Neapolis (Isauria) =

Neapolis (Ancient Greek: Νεάπολις) was a town in ancient Isauria. It became a bishopric: no longer the seat of a residential bishop, it remains, under the name of Neapolis in Isauria, a titular see of the Roman Catholic Church.

Its site is unlocated.
