= Musbanda =

Town of ancient Cilicia and later of Isauria

Coordinates: 36°32′26″N 32°33′50″E

Musbanda or Mousbanda, also called Mousbada, was a town of ancient Cilicia and later of Isauria, inhabited in Roman and Byzantine times. It became a bishopric; no longer the seat of a residential bishop, it remains a titular see of the Roman Catholic Church.

Its site is located near Dumlugöze, Asiatic Turkey.
