= Berissa =

Ancient Greek city

Coordinates: 37°15′05″N 32°52′39″E

Berissa (Ancient Greek: Βηρίσσα), also spelled Berisa, Verisa, or Verissa, was a city in the late Roman province of Pontus Polemoniacus, in Asia Minor, which Kiepert and W. M. Ramsay have identified with the modern village of Baulus (also known as Bolus), 25 kilometres south-west of Tokat.

== History ==
In the time of St. Basil Berissa was included in the diocese of Ibora, as appears from Basil's letters LXXXVI and LXXXVII, but soon after became an independent bishopric in Armenia Prima, with Sebasteia as metropolis. This important change took place before 458, when its bishop, Maxentius subscribed with his colleagues of Armenia Prima the synodal letter to the Emperor Leo I (Mansi, XII, 587-589). Hierocles, at the beginning of the 6th century, does not treat it as an independent city; but it is mentioned as such by Justinian in a Novella of 536, among the cities of Armenia Secunda. The emperor, when creating the province of Armenia Quarta in 536, gave to Armenia Prima the name of Armenia Secunda, without altering the established ecclesiastical organization, so that Berissa remained a suffragan see of Sebasteia. At some point while Berissa, under the name Verissa, was part of Armenia Secunda, the see was elevated to archiepiscopal rank, where Verissa is still regarded by the Roman Catholic Church as a titular see.

Among its later bishops may be mentioned Thomas, who was present at the fifth ecumenical council at Constantinople, in 553 (Mansi, IX, 175), and another at the sixth in 680–681 (Mansi, XI, 66). It appears still later in the Notitiae Episcopatuum as suffragan to Sebasteia. In some texts, it appears as Merisse or Kerisse, merely palaeographical mistakes.

Berissa was a Latin bishopric as late as the 15th century, when Paul II appointed the Franciscan Libertus de Broehun to succeed the deceased bishop, John (Wadding, Annales Minorum, VI, 708).

No longer a residential bishopric, Berissa is today listed by the Catholic Church as a titular see.
