= Hadriania (Mysia) =

Town of ancient Mysia

Coordinates: 39°35′18″N 28°37′59″E

Hadriania or Hadrianeia (Ancient Greek: Ἁδριάνεια) was a town of ancient Mysia. It was the seat of a bishop from an early date. No longer a residential see, it remains a titular see of the Roman Catholic Church.

Its site is located near Dursunbey in Asiatic Turkey.
