= Media, Africa =

Media was an ancient city and former bishopric in Roman North Africa, now a Latin Catholic titular see in Algeria.

== History ==
Media was important enough in the Roman province of Mauretania Caesariensis, in the papal sway, to become one of the many suffragan dioceses, but was to fade completely, no ruins being identified.

Its only historically documented bishop was Emilius, who attended the synod of Carthage called in 484 by king Huneric of the Vandal Kingdom, after which he was banished like most Catholic participants, unlike the Donatist heretics.

== Titular see ==
The diocese was nominally restored in 1933 as Latin titular bishopric of Media (Latine = Curiate Italian) / Medien(sis) (Latin adjective).

It has had the following incumbents, of the fitting Episcopal (lowest) rank with archiepiscopal exceptions :

- Antoine Hacault (1964.07.30 – 1972.10.28 see below) as Auxiliary Bishop of Archdiocese of Saint Boniface (Canada) (1964.07.30 – 1972.10.28)
- Titular Archbishop: Antoine Hacault (see above 1972.10.28 – 1974.09.07) as Coadjutor Archbishop of Saint-Boniface (Canada) (1972.10.28 – 1974.09.07); later succeeded as Metropolitan Archbishop of Saint-Boniface (1974.09.07 – death 2000.04.13)
- Endre Kovács, Cistercian Order (O. Cist.) (1975.01.07 – death 2007.07.29) as Auxiliary Bishop of Archdiocese of Eger (Hungary) (1975.01.07 – retired 2003.01.15) and as emeritate
- Petro Herkulan Malchuk, Friars Minor (O.F.M.) (born Moldova) (2008.03.29 – 2011.06.15) as Auxiliary Bishop of Diocese of Odesa–Simferopol (Ukraine) (2008.03.29 – 2011.06.15); later Archbishop-Bishop of Diocese of Kyïv–Žytomyr (Ukraine) (2011.06.15 – death 2016.05.27)
- Gabriel Narciso Escobar Ayala, Salesians (S.D.B.) (2013.06.18 – ...), as Apostolic Vicar of Chaco Paraguayo (Paraguay) (2013.06.18 – ...).

== See also ==
- List of Catholic dioceses in Algeria

== Sources ==
- Pius Bonifacius Gams, Series episcoporum Ecclesiae Catholicae, Leipzig 1931, p. 467
- Stefano Antonio Morcelli, Africa christiana, Volume I, Brescia 1816, p. 222
