= Oblate Sisters of St. Francis de Sales =

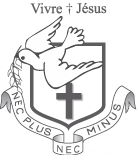
- Abbreviation: O.S.F.S.
- Formation: 30 October 1868; 157 years ago
- Type: Roman Catholic religious order
- Headquarters: Maison-Mère des Soeurs de St. Francis de Sales, (Motherhouse)
- Location: Troyes, France
- Key people: Father Louis Brisson—founder; Mother Frances de Sales Aviat—founder
- Website: Oblate Sisters of St Francis de Sales

The Oblate Sisters of St. Francis de Sales (Latin: Oblati Sancti Francisci Salesii, O.S.F.S.) are a congregation of Roman Catholic Religious Sisters who base their spirituality on the teachings of St. Francis de Sales and St. Jane de Chantal. (The Oblate Sisters of St. Francis de Sales are affiliated with the Oblate Priests and Brothers of St. Francis de Sales)

== Foundation ==
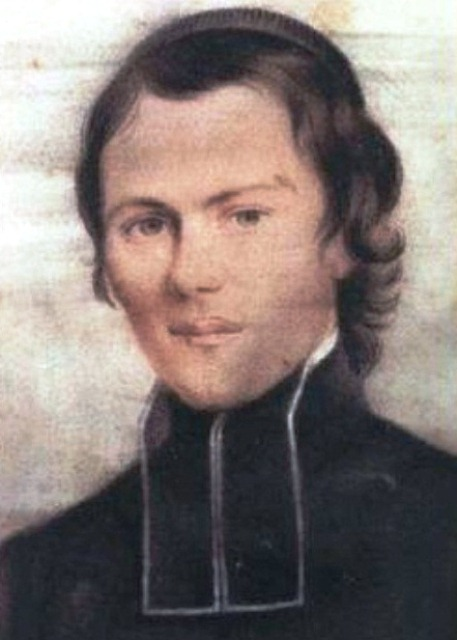
Pere Louis Brisson

In nineteenth century, it was not uncommon to find child labor and unfair labor practices in industrialized France. There were many altercations between workers and government, such as the Paris Commune and the Canut Revolts. Maurice Maignen, one of the founders of the Congregation of the Brothers of St. Vincent de Paul, also found the “Circle of Young Workers", better known as "Catholic Circle of Montparnasse" in 1855. There were very similar Social movements throughout France during this time. Troyes was no exception. This “Industrial Revolution” flocked young country boys and girls to Troyes for work in the factories and textile mills. Many of these young workers were on their own and exposed to the dangers of the city. Father Louis Brisson was concerned about these young workers. In 1858, he began to set up clubs, workshops and houses to help the young girls organising their new lives. Assisting Fr Brisson in the “Oeuvres Ouvrières”, were lay women, such as the young lady, Léonie Aviat, whom he met when she was a boarder at the Convent School of the Visitation.

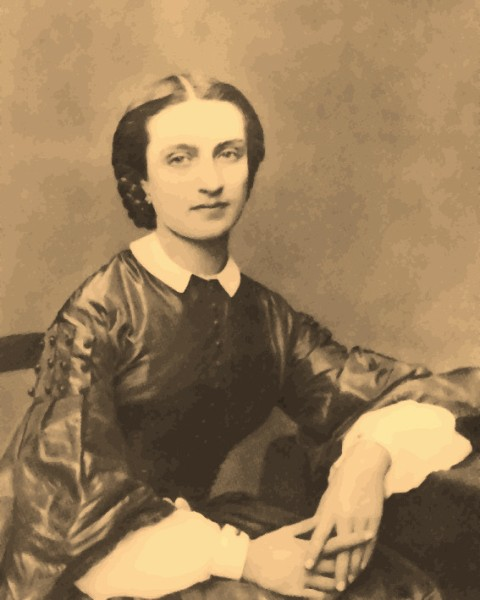
Léonie Aviat

Léonie seemed to Father Brisson, to possess the spirit of service and the necessary qualities of organization requested for this ambitious project. At 21 years of age, Leonie she took on the direction of the working girls’ apostolate on April 18, 1866. As this apostolate developed, Father Brisson gave it greater stability by founding a female religious congregation, the Oblate Sisters of Saint Francis de Sales, whose purpose was to help the working girls to keep their dignity and to become women of conscience and faith.

On October 30, 1868, Léonie, along with Lucie Canuet, received the habit of the new congregation from Bishop Gaspard Mermillod of Geneva. At this time, she received her new name: Sister Françoise de Sales Aviat. She became the first Superior General of this congregation.

The purpose of the new congregation was an apostolate among the working class according to the spirit of Saint Francis de Sales. The congregation of sisters grew and this working class apostolate spread rapidly. The Sisters also ran Sunday clubs, boarding houses and primary schools. Their Social Apostolate flourished throughout France.

The anti-clerical laws and complete secularization of France at the beginning of the 20th century began with the secularization of the religious houses and exiling of the occupants. In 1904, Mother Aviat, along with her Oblate Sisters, transferred their Motherhouse to Perugia, Italy. Fr Brisson, died on February 2, 1908, in Plancy In 1911, Pope Pius X approved the constitutions of the Oblate Sisters of St. Francis de Sales. Mother Aviat died on 10 January 1914, while still exiled in Perugia. The Motherhouse returned to Troyes in the Spring of 1948. They remains of the founders, Saint Léonie Aviat and Blessed Louis Brisson are buried in the crypt chapel of the Oblate Sisters’ Motherhouse in Troyes.

== Apostolate ==
Oblate Sisters serve the in education, social work, youth ministry, parish ministries, and missionary activity in South America and Africa.

Oblate refers to persons, especially in the Middle Ages, who offered themselves and their property to a monastery.

== Oblate Sisters in Africa ==
When the Vicar Apostolic of Cape of Good Hope, Bishop John Leonard, heard that the Society of African Missions of Lyons had decided to recall its subjects from Namaqualand and the North Western Cape, he made a trip to Europe in 1880 in hopes of finding a Congregation willing to assume the responsibility of evangelizing these districts. Fr. Brisson sent five missionary priests in 1882, to fulfill Bishop Leonard's request. Soon after, three Oblate Sisters left Troyes and supported the Oblate Priests in South Africa. Republic of South Africa Missions were founded in Matjieskloof in 1885, Nababeep in 1900, O’kiep in 1904, and Port Nolloth in 1904. Republic of Namibia Missions were founded in Heirachabies in 1896, Warmbad in 1907, and Gabis in 1907.

== Oblate Sisters in South America ==
The Oblate Sisters arrived in Riobamba, Ecuador in 1888, from Europe. In May 1910, a convent was found in Manta and in 1930, after long hard efforts and expectations, the sisters opened a school for girls. The sisters began working at the Leonie Aviat school in the Tarqui administrative district in Manta Canton, Ecuador, in 1960. In 2016 the school an enrollment of more than 900 students.

In 1955, the sisters extended their apostolate and opened another school in Quito. The sisters have spread their works throughout Ecuador and Colombia.

== Oblate Sisters in North America ==
In 1893, the first Oblates priests came to the United States, serving chaplaincies in the New York City area. In 1906, the first English speaking province was established in Wilmington, Delaware. In 1950, Mother Jeanne de Sales visited the Manta convent and school in South America and stopped in the United States to see the Oblate Provincial, Fr. William Buckley, who was asking for the Sisters to establish itself in the USA. Within a year, Sister Bertha Gonzaga and her companions arrived from France and were living in a small house on the property of the Oblate Fathers’ novitiate in Childs, Maryland. Initially, some of the sisters worked in the seminary kitchen.

In 1952, the sisters converted the Cecil County Almshouse and established their convent, naming it “Villa Aviat”. In 1954, the Oblate Sisters’ Kindergarten opened.

In 1960, their apostolate of education expanded when they opened Mount Aviat Academy, . From 1983 to 2010, they operated St. Bernadette of Lourdes in Drexel Hill, Pennsylvania. From 1998 to 2019, the Sisters’ staffed Holy Cross Academy in Fredericksburg, Virginia. In 2019, the Sisters' arrived in Towson, Maryland to further their apostolate work at Immaculate Heart of Mary Parochial School. They also have a presence at DeSales University in Center Valley, Pennsylvania, as of 2010.

== Oblate Sisters of St Francis de Sales links ==
In France:

- Maison-Mère des Soeurs Oblates de Saint François de Sales (Troyes)
- Lycée Léonie Aviat (Troyes)
- Lycée Privé Saint-François de Sales (Troyes)
- Collège Lycée Privé Thérèse Chappuis (Paris)
- Ecole Privé Ste Marie (Voiron)
- Foyer Féminin Saint-Antoine (Grasse)

In Italy:

- Suore Oblate di San Francesco di Sales (Perugia)

In Switzerland:

- Institut St-François de Sales (Châtel St-Denis)
- Maison Chappuis, Ecole Pour Jeunes Filles (Soyhières)

In Austria:

- Institut St-François de Sales (Linz)
- Fachschulen für Wirtschaftliche Berufe der Schwestern Oblatinnen (Linz)
- Heim St. Genoveva für Schülerinnen & Lehrlinge (Wien)

In Africa:

- Oblate Sisters of St. Francis de Sales (Namibia & South Africa)

In South America:

- Unidad Educativa Stella Maris (Manta, Ecuador)
- Unidad Educativa San Francisco de Sales (Quito, Ecuador)

In United States:

- Oblate Sisters of St. Francis de Sales - American Website (Childs, Maryland)
- Mount Aviat Academy (Childs, Maryland)
- Immaculate Heart of Mary Parochial School (Towson, Maryland)
- DeSales University: Campus Ministry (Center Valley, Pennsylvania)
