= Francis de Sales =

Bishop of Geneva and Catholic saint (1567–1622)

Saint Francis de Sales CO, OM
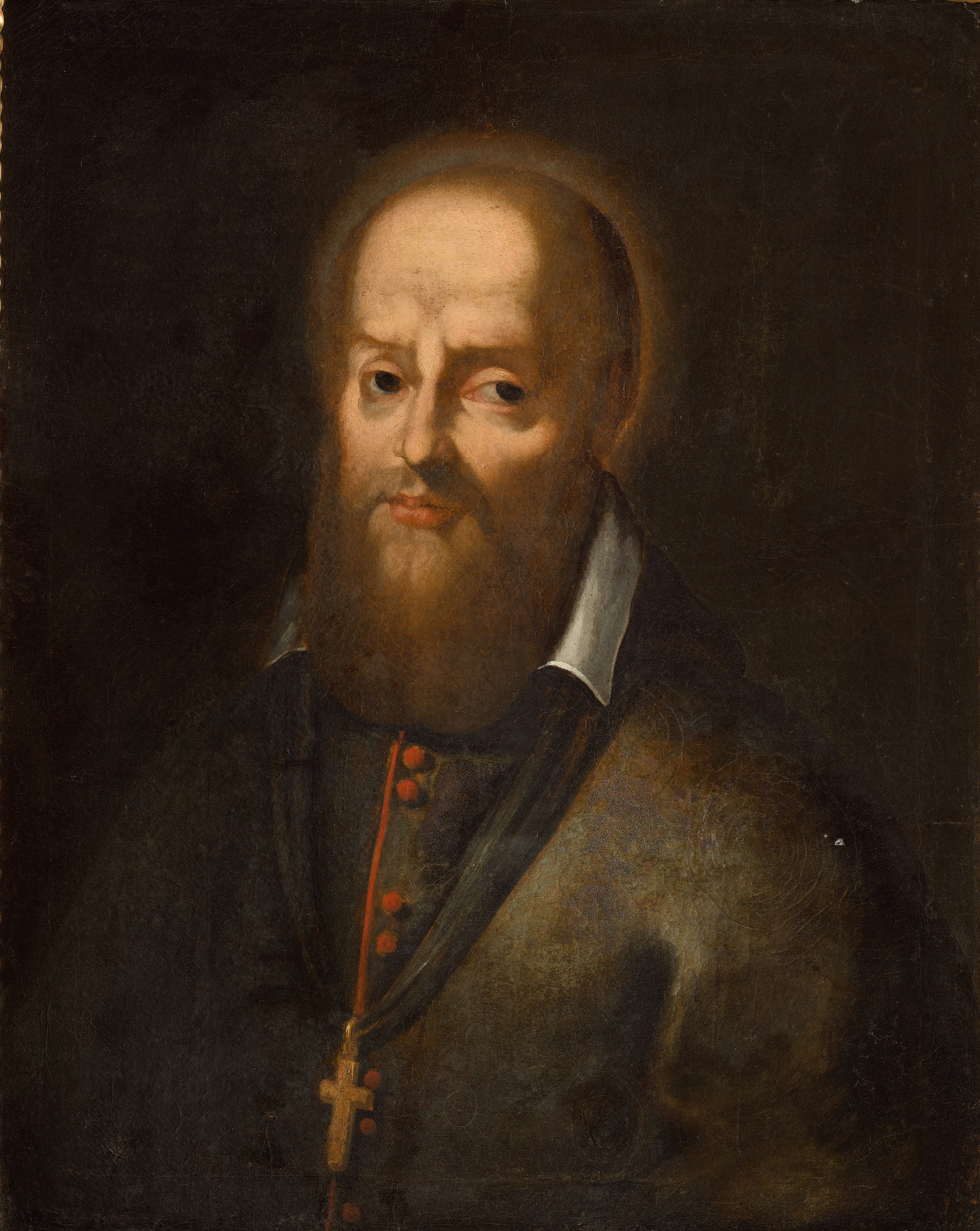
- 17th-century portrait of Francis de Sales

Bishop and Doctor of the Church
- Born: 21 August 1567; Château de Sales, Duchy of Savoy
- Residence: Annecy, France
- Died: 28 December 1622 (aged 55); Lyon, Kingdom of France
- Beatified: 8 January 1661, Rome, Papal States, by Pope Alexander VII
- Canonized: 8 April 1665, Rome, Papal States, by Pope Alexander VII
- Feast: 24 January (General Roman Calendar of 1969); 29 January (General Roman Calendar of 1960 and local communities)
- Attributes: Heart of Jesus, Crown of Thorns
- Patronage: Baker, Oregon; Cincinnati, Ohio; Diocese of Houma-Thibodaux, Louisiana; Catholic press; Columbus, Ohio; confessors; deaf people; educators; Upington, South Africa; Wilmington, Delaware; writers; journalists; the Institute of Christ the King Sovereign Priest; Missionaries of St. Francis de Sales; Oblates of St. Francis de Sales; Salesians of Don Bosco

Saint Francis de Sales
- Bishop of Geneva
- Native name: François de Sales
- Province: Vienne
- Diocese: Geneva
- Appointed: 15 July 1602 (Coadjutor)
- Installed: 8 December 1602
- Term ended: 28 December 1622
- Predecessor: Claude de Granier
- Successor: Jean-François de Sales
- Previous post: Titular Bishop of Nicopolis ad Iaterum (1602)

Orders
- Ordination: 18 December 1593
- Consecration: 8 December 1602

Personal details
- Motto: Non-excidet
- Coat of arms

Francis de Sales (French: François de Sales; Italian: Francesco di Sales; Arpitan: Francês de Sâles; 21 August 1567 – 28 December 1622) was a Catholic prelate from Savoy who served as Bishop of Geneva from 1602 to 1622. He became noted for his deep faith and his gentle approach to the religious divisions in his land resulting from the Protestant Reformation. He is known also for his writings on the topics of spiritual direction and spiritual formation, particularly the Introduction to the Devout Life and the Treatise on the Love of God. He was a member of the Oratory of Saint Philip Neri, a tertiary of the Order of Minims, and was canonized in 1665.

== Life ==
=== Early years ===
Francis de Sales was born two months premature on 21 August 1567 in the Château de Sales into the noble Sales family of the Duchy of Savoy, in what is today Thorens-Glières, Haute-Savoie, France. His father was François de Sales, Lord of Sales, and Novel, and by marriage, de Boisy. His mother was a noblewoman, Françoise de Sionnaz, the only child of the prominent magistrate, Melchior de Sionnaz, Seigneur de Vallières, de la Thuile, and de Boisy. This being one of the noblest families in Savoy, Francis's father was generally known as M. de Boisy.

He was baptised Francis Bonaventura after his godparents, François de la Fléchère and Damoiselle Bonaventure de Chevron-Villette, who was also his widowed, maternal grandmother. His father wanted him, the first of his six sons, to attend the best schools in preparation for a career as a magistrate. He therefore enjoyed a privileged education in the nearby town of La Roche-Sur-Foron, and at the age of eight at the Capuchin college in Annecy.

=== Education and self-consecration ===
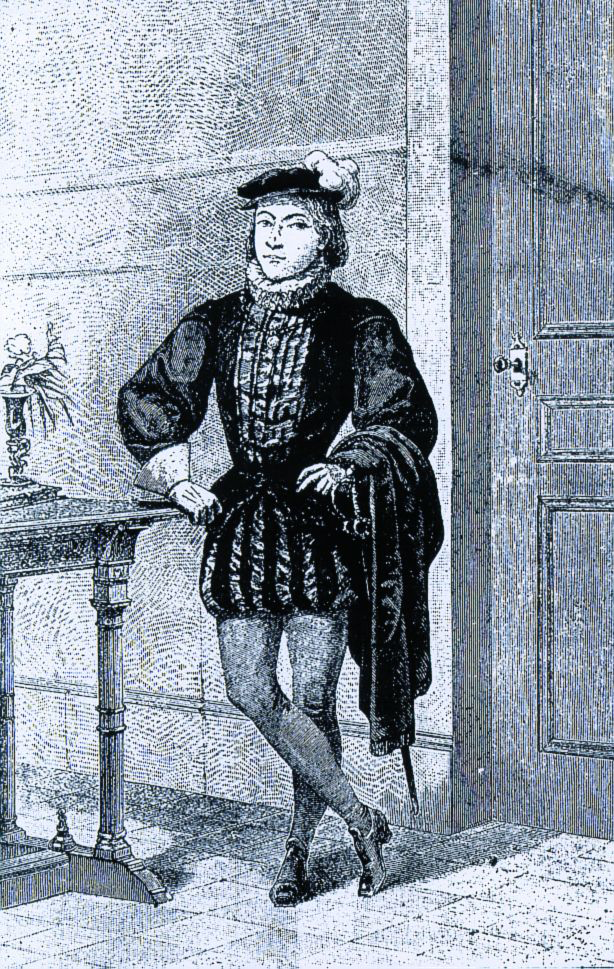
Francis de Sales age 12

In 1578, de Sales went to the Collège de Clermont, then a Jesuit institution, to study rhetoric and humanities. On this first visit to Paris, he lived near the Église Sainte-Geneviève with his three cousins. As a nobleman, he was accompanied by his servant and by a priest tutor, Abbé Déage. To please his father, he took lessons in the gentlemanly pursuits of riding, dancing, and fencing. De Sales is described as intelligent and handsome, tall and well built with blue-grey eyes, somewhat reserved and quiet, and a welcome guest in the homes of the nobility among whom his father had connections.

In 1586, Francis de Sales attended a theological discussion about predestination that convinced him of his damnation to hell. A personal crisis of despair resulted. That conviction lasted through December 1586. His great despair made him physically ill and even bedridden for a time. Sometime in either late December or early January 1587, he visited the old parish of Saint-Étienne-des-Grès, Paris, where he prayed the "Memorare" before a famed statue of Our Lady of Good Deliverance, a Black Madonna. He consecrated himself to the Blessed Virgin Mary and decided to dedicate his life to God with a vow of chastity. He then became a tertiary of the Minim Order.

De Sales ultimately concluded that God had good in store for him because "God is love", as the First Epistle of John attests. This faithful devotion to God not only expelled his doubts but also influenced the rest of his life and his teachings. His way of teaching Catholic spirituality is often referred to as the Way of Divine Love, or the Devout Life, taken from a book he wrote of a similar name: Introduction to the Devout Life.

De Sales completed his studies at Collège de Clermont and enrolled at the University of Padua, in Italy, where he studied both law and theology. He was accompanied by his twelve-year-old brother, Gallois, also a student in Padua. De Sales took Antonio Possevino, a priest in the Society of Jesus, as his spiritual director.

=== Return to Savoy ===
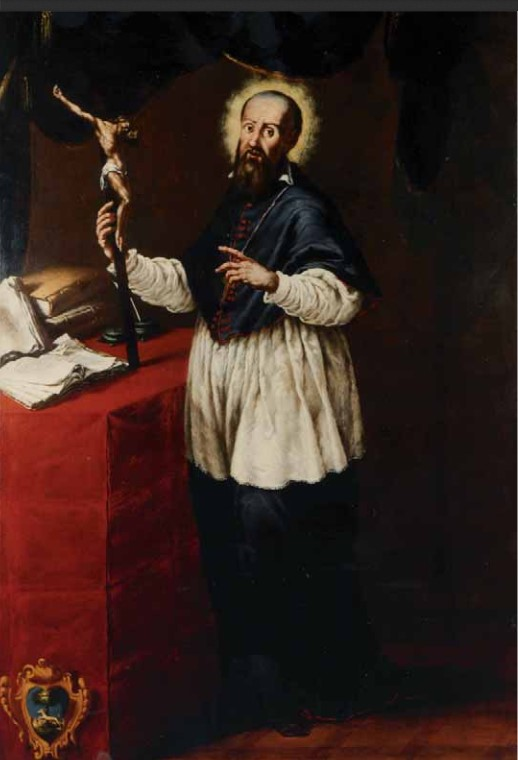
St Francis de Sales, by Giovanni Battista Lucini

In 1592, de Sales received his doctorate in law and theology and made up his mind to become a priest. He made a pilgrimage to Loreto, Italy, famous for its Basilica Della Santa Casa (Shrine of the Holy House) and then returned home to Savoy. As the eldest son and heir, he held the title of Seigneur de Villeroget. The Senate of Chambéry admitted him as a lawyer. Meanwhile, his father secured various positions for Francis, including an appointment as a senator. His father also chose a wealthy noble heiress as his bride, but Francis refused to marry, preferring to stay focused on his chosen path. His father initially refused to accept that Francis had chosen the priesthood rather than fulfill his expectations with a political-military career. His cousin, Canon Louis de Sales, persuaded the Bishop of Geneva, Claude de Granier, to obtain for Francis the position of provost of the cathedral chapter of Geneva, a post in the patronage of the pope. It was the highest office in the diocese; M. de Boisy yielded. After signing over to his younger brother, Louis, his title and right of succession, Francis was ordained in 1593.

=== Priest and provost ===
Because Geneva was controlled by the Calvinist Republic of Geneva, the bishop resided about twenty miles south, in Annecy. De Sales preached in the Cathedral of Annecy, at parish churches and before confraternities. He was an effective speaker; his voice was deep and rich in tone and his speech somewhat slow and measured. His sermons were comparatively short and without the customary displays of erudition. He avoided controversy and focused on a particular point of duty, a specific virtue or the correction of some vice. The cathedral chapter recommended that although he was only twenty-seven years of age, the provost be named Grand Penitentiary of the diocese, with the result that de Sales found himself taking many more confessions.

==== Chablais ====
In 1594, the Duke of Savoy requested the bishop of Geneva to send a missionary to the Chablais, an area that had been long held by the Swiss and only recently returned to Savoy. The task would be both difficult and dangerous, and the most qualified for the assignment was the provost. Despite his family's objections, de Sales readily accepted. Accompanied only by his cousin, the Canon Louis, they made their base the fortress of Allinges to which the Governor of the Province, Baron d'Hermance, insisted they return each night. Gradually they expanded their efforts, with de Sales concentrating on Thonon-les-Bains, which had become almost completely Calvinist. He also attended the Savoyard soldiers garrisoned at Allinges.

They met great opposition from the Geneva ministers, who accused de Sales of being a sorcerer. He moved to Thonon, where he boarded with a widow, who on one occasion hid him from some armed men. More than once, he escaped death at the hands of assassins. His mother managed to send him some linen and money, which he distributed to the poor. A good deal of his religious instruction was handled individually and privately. It was at this time that Francis began writing pamphlets which were later collected and published as The Catholic Controversy. Gradually, the mission began to show some small success.

In 1599 he was appointed coadjutor bishop of Geneva. In 1602, he was sent on a diplomatic mission to Henry IV of France to negotiate the restoration of Catholic worship in Gex, a part of the diocese that had been returned to France. He was invited to give the Lenten sermons at the Chapel Royal. The morals at court reflected those of the King, which were notorious, but King Henry became personally attached to Francis and is said to have observed, "A rare bird, this Monsieur de Genève, he is devout and also learned; and not only devout and learned but at the same time a gentleman. A very rare combination."

While in Paris, he also met Cardinal Berulle and Madame Acarie. They consulted with him on matters such as the introduction of Teresa of Ávila's Carmelites into France and plans for the reforming of monasteries and convents. He was consulted on matters of conscience by persons at court.

Arms of St Francis de Sales

=== Bishop of Geneva ===
In 1602, Bishop Granier died, and Sales was consecrated Bishop of Geneva by Vespasien Gribaldi, assisted by Thomas Pobel and Jacques Maistret, O.Carm., as co-consecrators. He resided in Annecy (now in France) because Geneva remained under Calvinist control and was therefore closed to him. His diocese became famous throughout Europe for its efficient organisation, zealous clergy and well-instructed laity, an achievement in those days.

He worked closely with the Order of Friars Minor Capuchin, which was very active in preaching the Catholic faith in his diocese. It appreciated his cooperation so much that in 1617 it made him an official associate of the Order, the highest honour possible for a non-member. It is said that at Evian, on the south shore of Lake Geneva, Francis of Assisi appeared to him and said: "You desire martyrdom, just as I once longed for it. But, like me, you will not obtain it. You will have to become an instrument of your own martyrdom." During his years as bishop, de Sales acquired a reputation as a spellbinding preacher and something of an ascetic. His motto was, "He who preaches with love, preaches effectively." His goodness, patience and mildness became proverbial.

=== Author ===
These last qualities come through in de Sales' books, the most famous of which was Introduction to the Devout Life, which, unusually for the time, was written for laypeople, especially for women. In it, he counseled charity over penance as a means of progressing in the spiritual life. De Sales also left a mystical work, the Treatise on the Love of God, and many highly valued letters of spiritual direction, including those with Jane Frances de Chantal compiled in the Letters of Spiritual Direction.

=== Founder ===
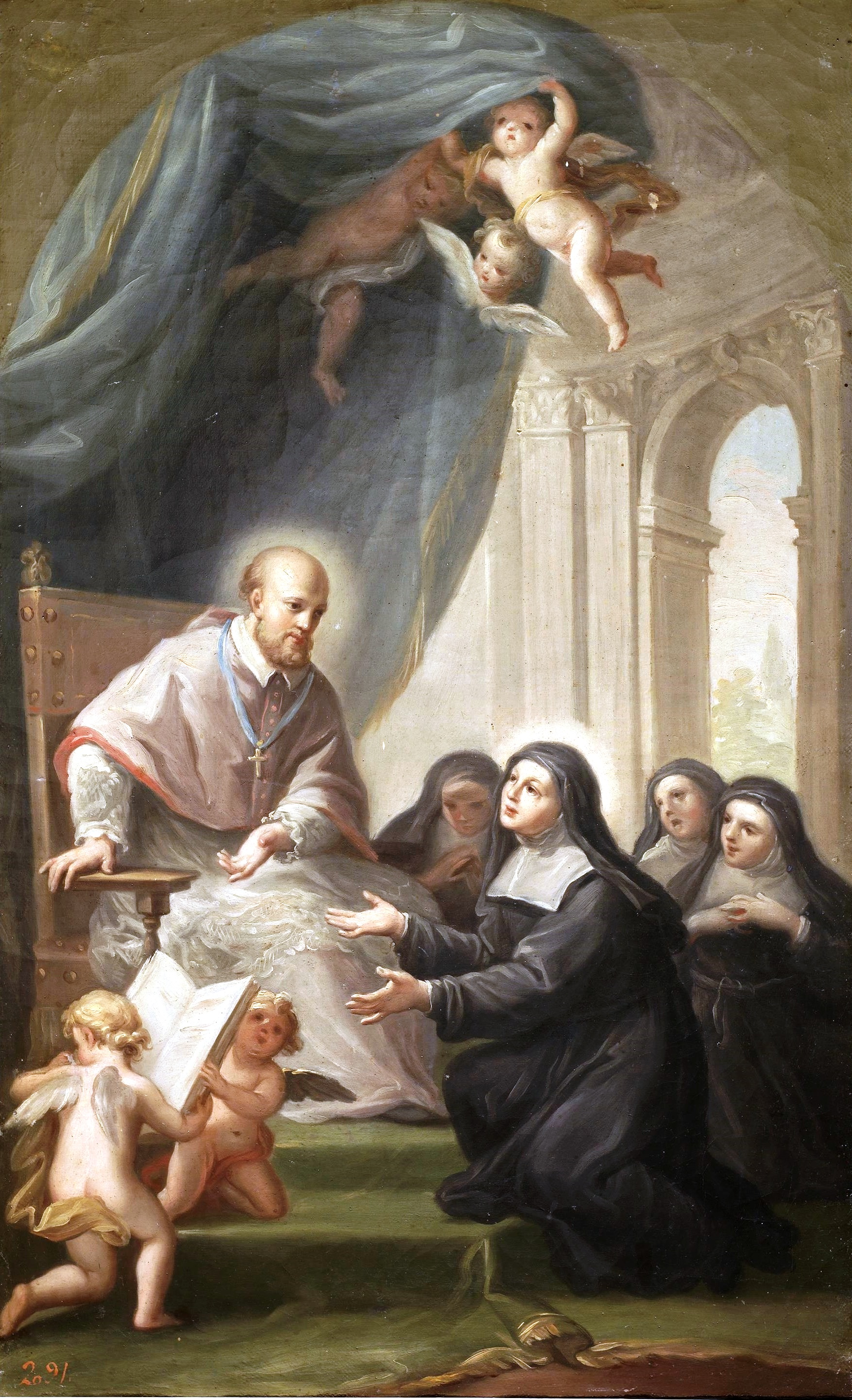
San Francisco de Sales, by Francisco Bayeu y Subías

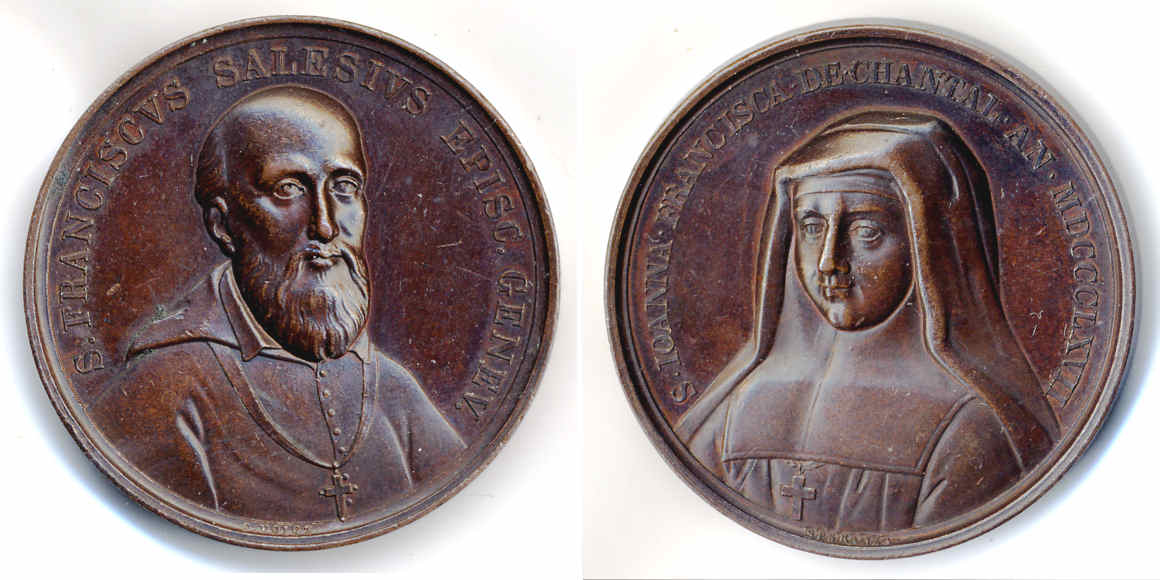
Francis de Sales and Jane Frances de Chantal, medal 1867

Along with Chantal, de Sales founded the women's Order of the Visitation of Holy Mary (Visitandines) in Annecy on 6 June 1610. Archbishop Denis-Simon de Marquemont required the order's members to maintain cloistered lives.

Sales also established a community of men, an Oratory of St. Philip Neri, at Thonon-les-Bains, with himself as the superior, or Provost. That work, however, was crippled by his death, and the community soon died out.

=== Death ===
In December 1622, de Sales was required to travel in the entourage of Charles Emmanuel I, Duke of Savoy, for the Duke's Christmas tour of his domain. Upon arrival in Lyon, de Sales chose to stay in the gardener's hut at the Visitandine monastery in that city. While there, he suffered a stroke, from which he died on 28 December 1622.

== Posthumous veneration ==
De Sales has been styled "Gentleman Saint" because of his patience and gentleness. His autopsy revealed many gallstones. Despite the resistance of the populace of Lyon to moving his remains from that city, he was buried on 24 January 1623 in the church of the Monastery of the Visitation in Annecy, which he had founded with Chantal, who was also buried there. Their remains were venerated there until the French Revolution. Many miracles have been reported at his shrine.

His heart was kept in Lyon, in response to the popular demand of the citizens of the city to retain his remains. During the French Revolution, however, it was saved from the revolutionaries by being carried by the Visitation nuns from Lyon to Venice.

De Sales was beatified in 1661 by Pope Alexander VII, who then canonised him four years later. De Sales was declared a Doctor of the Church by Pope Pius IX in 1877.

The Roman Catholic Church celebrates de Sales' feast on 24 January, the day of his burial in Annecy in 1624. From 1666, when his feast day was inserted into the General Roman Calendar to its 1969 revision, it was celebrated on 29 January.

Francis is remembered in the Church of England with a Lesser Festival on 24 January. In 2022, Francis de Sales was officially added to the Episcopal Church liturgical calendar with a feast day shared with Jane Frances de Chantal on 12 December.

== Patronage ==
In 1923, Pope Pius XI proclaimed him a patron of writers and journalists because de Sales made extensive use of broadsheets and books in spiritual direction and in his efforts to convert the Calvinists of the region. De Sales developed a sign language to teach a deaf man about God; this has made him the patron saint of the deaf.

Having been founded as one of the first non-cloistered group of sisters, after attempts had been with the Visitation Sisters founded by de Sales and de Chantal, the Sisters of St. Joseph (founded in Le Puys, France, in 1650) take de Sales as one of their patrons. The Missionaries of St. Francis de Sales, founded by the Abbé Pierre Mermier in 1838, were the first religious congregation to adopt his spirituality in the 19th century.

- The religious institute of the Salesians of Don Bosco, founded by John Bosco in 1859 (approved by the Holy See in 1874), is also known as the Society of Saint Francis de Sales, and is placed under his patronage.
- The Oblate Sisters of St. Francis de Sales were founded by Léonie Aviat and Louis Brisson, under the spiritual guidance of the Marie de Sales Chappuis in 1866. The Oblates of St. Francis de Sales order for men was later founded by Brisson, also under the guidance of Marie de Sales, in 1875.
- The Congregation of the Oratory of St. Philip Neri count him as one of their patrons, given his close association with St. Philip Neri's disciples and his founding of the Oratory in Thonon, France (now defunct), of which he was the first superior.
- The Paulist Fathers in the United States count him as their patron.

== Legacy ==
=== Congregations ===
In the 19th century, his vision for religious communities was revived. Several religious institutes were founded during that period for men and women desiring to live out the spiritual path that de Sales had developed.

- The Missionaries of St. Francis de Sales (MSFS), founded by the Abbé Pierre Mermier in 1838, were the first congregation to adopt his spirituality in the 19th century.
- The religious institute of the Salesians of Don Bosco (SDB), founded by John Bosco in 1859 (approved by the Holy See in 1874), is also known as the Society of Saint Francis de Sales, and is placed under his patronage.
- The Oblate Sisters of St. Francis de Sales (OSFS) were founded by Léonie Aviat and Louis Brisson, under the spiritual guidance of the Marie de Sales Chappuis in 1866.
- The Oblates of St. Francis de Sales (OSFS) order for men was later founded by Brisson, also under the guidance of Marie de Sales, in 1875.
- The Paulist Fathers in the United States count him as one of their patrons.

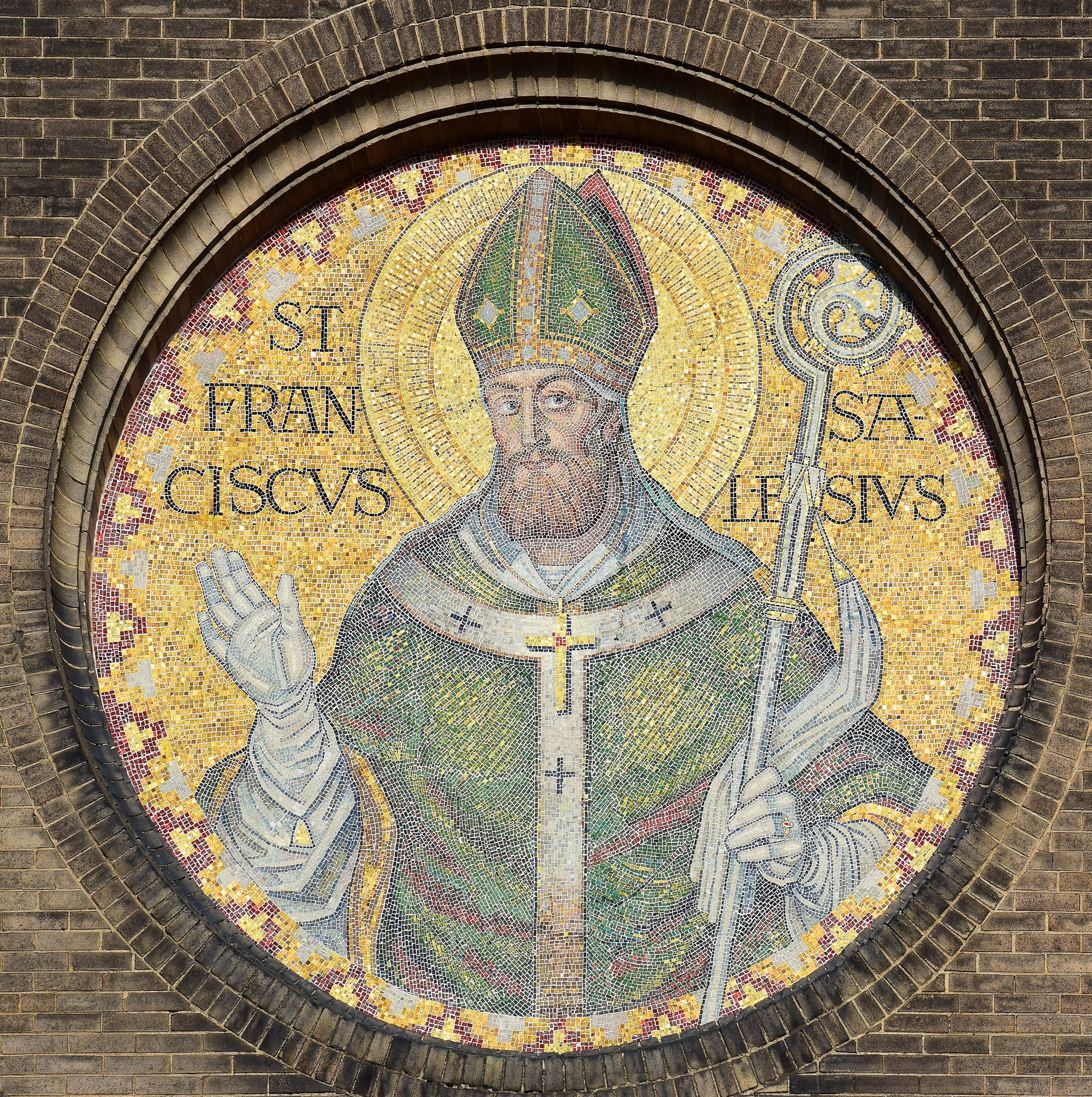
Mosaic of Francis de Sales on the exterior of St. Francis de Sales Oratory in St. Louis, Missouri

The Institute of Christ the King Sovereign Priest, a society of priests founded in the 20th century, also has Francis de Sales as one of its three primary patrons. One of the major apostolates of the Institute in the United States is the Oratory of St. Francis de Sales in St. Louis, Missouri.

=== Influence on other saints ===
In 1618 or 1619 Vincent de Paul met in Paris Francis de Sales, whose spirituality and writings, especially An Introduction to the Devout Life, and Treatise on the Love of God, were to have a profound influence on Vincent.

His work Treatise on the Love of God, also heavily features in the writings of Paul of the Cross, founder of the Passionists.

His writings on the perfections of the heart of Mary as the model of love for God influenced John Eudes to develop the devotion to the Hearts of Jesus and Mary.

== Namesakes ==
=== Educational institutions ===
- St. Francis de Sales School, Lebanon, Ohio
- St. Francis de Sales School, Newark, Ohio
- St Francis' College, Letchworth Garden City, Hertfordshire, England
- St. Francis de Sales Catholic Junior School, Liverpool, England
- School of Sacred Heart St. Francis de Sales, Bennington, Vermont
- St. Francis de Sales Catholic School, Toronto, ON, Canada
- St. Francis De Sales Catholic School, Houston, TX
- St. Francis de Sales Catholic School, Riverside, CA
- St. Francis de Sales Catholic School, Lake Zurich, IL
- St. Francis de Sales School, Morgantown, WV, United States
- St Francis de Sales School, Beckley, West Virginia
- St Francis de Sales School, Philadelphia, Pennsylvania
- St. Francis de Sales Catholic High School, Walla Walla, Washington
- DeSales High School in Louisville, Kentucky
- DeSales University, located in Center Valley, Pennsylvania (formerly Allentown College of St. Francis de Sales)
- Mount de Sales Academy, Catonsville, Maryland
- Mount de Sales Academy, Georgia
- Saint Francis de Sales Seminary Milwaukee, Wisconsin
- Salesianum School, Wilmington, DE, United States
- St. Francis DeSales High School in Columbus, OH, United States
- St. Francis de Sales High School in Chicago, IL, United States
- St. Francis de Sales High School in Toledo, OH, United States
- St. Francis de Sales College, in Mount Barker, South Australia, Australia
- St. Francis de Sales – St. Stephen School, in Geneva, NY, United States
- St. Francis de Sales School, in Nagpur, India, managed by the Missionaries of St. Francis de Sales
- St. Francis de Sales School, in New Delhi, India, managed by the Missionaries of St. Francis de Sales
- St. Francis de Sales School, in Visakhapatnam City, India, managed by the Missionaries of St. Francis de Sales
- St. Francis de Sales School, in Gangapur City, India, managed by the Missionaries of St. Francis de Sales
- St. Francis De Sales School, in Nallasopara, India, managed by the Missionaries of St. Francis de Sales
- St. Francis de Sales School, in Dhemaji, India, managed by the Missionaries of St. Francis de Sales
- St. Francis de Sales School, in Nizamabad, Telangana, India
- St. Francis de Sales School, in Wellington, New Zealand
- St. Francis de Sales High School, Francis Nagar, Korutla
- St. Francis de Sales School for the Deaf in Brooklyn, New York
- St. Francis de Sales College, in Nagpur, India
- The three seminary departments in the Archdiocese of Lipa are named after St. Francis de Sales (St. Francis de Sales Minor, Major, and Theological Seminary)
- St Francis de Sales College, Bengaluru, India
- SFS Public School and Junior College, Kerala (Ettumanoor), India
- St. Francis de Sales elementary school, Lake Geneva, WI, United States
- St. Francis de Sales School, Salisbury, MD, United States
- St. Francis de Sales Regional Catholic School, Herkimer, NY, United States
- St. Francis de Sales Catholic School, Lockport, NY, United States (formerly St. Francis de Sales High School)
- St. Francis de Sales School, Sherman Oaks, CA, United States
- St. Francis Sales Senior Secondary School, Kerala (Vizhinjam), India
- St. Francis De Sales, Guwahati, Assam, India

=== Others ===
- St. Francis de Sales Catholic Church, Paducah, Kentucky
- St. Francis de Sales Parish, Cincinnati, Ohio
- St. Francis de Sales Parish, Newark, Ohio
- St. Francis De Sales Parish, Akron, Ohio
- Casa Santa di San Francesco di Sales, Erice, Italy
- St. Francis De Sales and All Souls, Devonport. Auckland, New Zealand
- The island of St. François Atoll
- Saint Francis Hospital & Medical Center in Hartford, CT, United States.
- St. Francis de Sales Broadcast Center in Batangas City, Philippines houses two radio stations under the Catholic Media Network: 99.1 Spirit FM and ALFM 95.9 Radyo Totoo
- St. Francis de Sales Roman Catholic Church
- St. Francis de Sales Roman Catholic Church (Charlestown, Mass.)
- St Francis de Sales Roman Catholic Church (Purcellville, Virginia)
- St. Francis de Sales Roman Catholic Church, Morgantown, WV, United States
- St. Francis de Sales Church (Norton Shores, Michigan), Norton Shores, MI, United States
- St Francis de Sales, Hampton Hill and Upper Teddington
- St. Francis De Sales Catholic Church, Ajax, Ontario, Canada
- St. Francis De Sales Parish, Lakeview, Michigan
- St. Francis De Sales Parish, Dalugama, Kelaniya, Sri Lanka
- St. Francis de Sales Catholic Parish, Miami Beach, Florida
- St. Francis de Sales Parish, Estelline, South Dakota
- St. Francis de Sales Catholic Church, Lamar, Colorado
- St. Francis de Sales Co-Cathedral, Houma, Louisiana
- St. Francis de Sales Roman Catholic Church (Abingdon, MD)
- St. Francis de Sales Parish,Lusaka,Thornpark, Zambia.
- Saint-François-du-Lac, Québec, Canada
- St. Francis de Sales Catholic Church, Riverside, California

== Bibliography ==
- Francis de Sales, Introduction to the Devout Life, London, 2012. limovia.net ISBN 978-1-78336-023-9
- Francis de Sales, Treatise on the Love of God [known as "Theotimus"], London, 2012. limovia.net ISBN 978-1-78336-024-6
- Introduction to the Devout Life (Translated and Edited by John K. Ryan), Doubleday, 1972. ISBN 978-0-385-03009-0
- The Catholic Controversy: St. Francis de Sales' Defense of the Faith, TAN Books, 1989. ISBN 978-0-89555-387-4
- Set Your Heart Free (Edited by John Kirvan), Ave Maria Press, 2008. ISBN 978-1-59471-153-4
- Sermons of St. Francis de Sales on Prayer, TAN Books, 1985. ISBN 978-0-89555-258-7
- Sermons of St. Francis de Sales on Our Lady, TAN Books, 1985. ISBN 978-0-89555-259-4
- Sermons of St. Francis de Sales For Lent, TAN Books, 2009. ISBN 978-0-89555-260-0
- Sermons of St. Francis de Sales for Advent and Christmas, TAN Books, 1987. ISBN 978-0-89555-261-7

== See also ==
- Saint Francis de Sales, Patron Archive
- Savoy

== Sources ==
Catholic Church titles
Preceded by Giovanni Fontana	— TITULAR — Bishop of Nicopolis ad Iaterum; 15 July 1602 – 17 September 1602	Succeeded by Bernardin Corneillan
Preceded by Claude de Granier	Bishop of Geneva; 17 September 1602 – 28 December 1622	Succeeded by Jean-François de Sales
