= Athanasius Center =

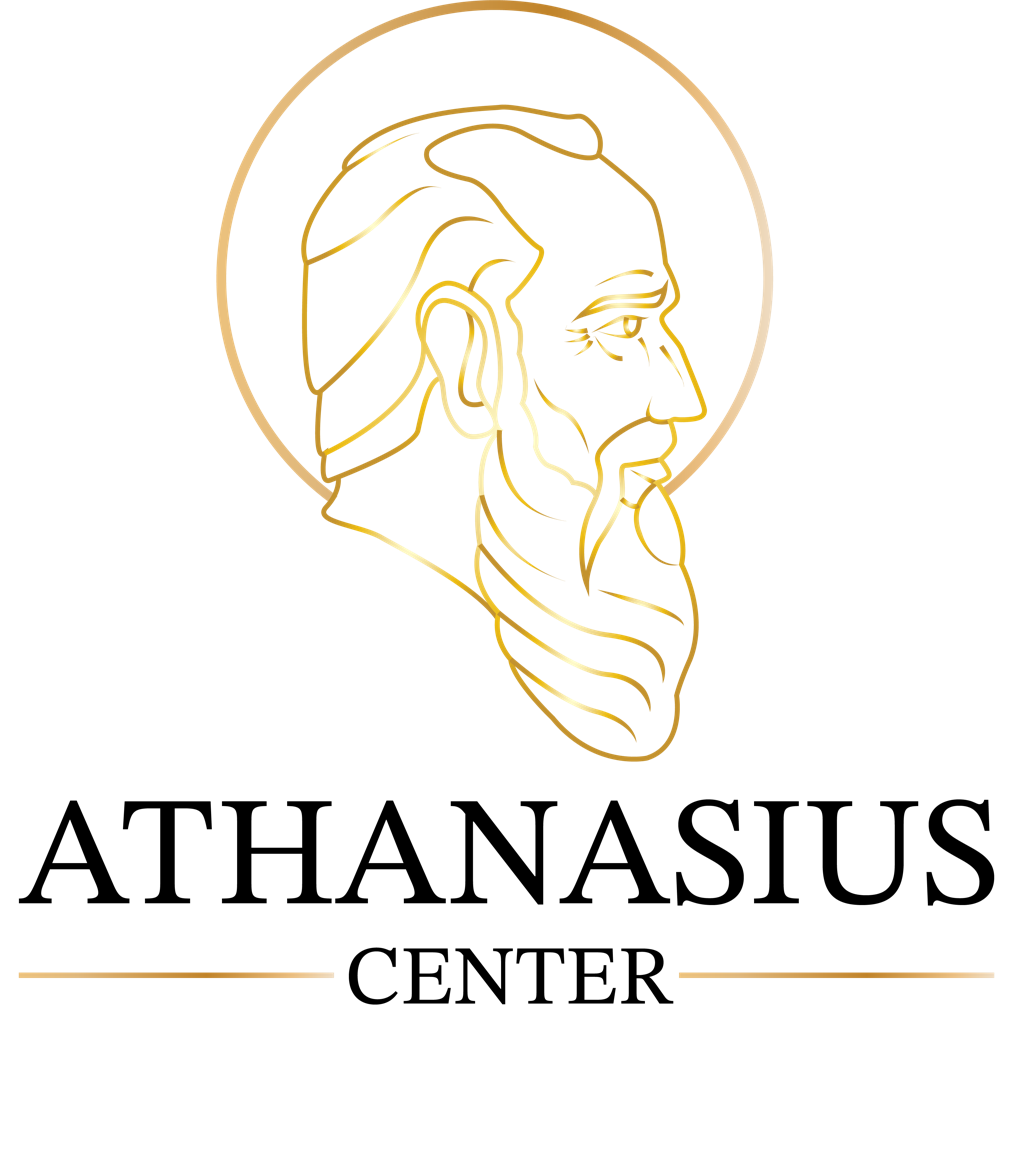
- Abbreviation: AC
- Formation: September 10, 2023
- Founders: Oliver S. Galbraith; Robert M. Turbeville
- Type: Catholic ministry
- Headquarters: Wilmington, North Carolina, U.S.
- Co-Directors: Oliver S. Galbraith; Julianna E. Breit
- Parent organization: Catholic Church
- Website: www.instagram.com/athanasius_center/

Coat of arms
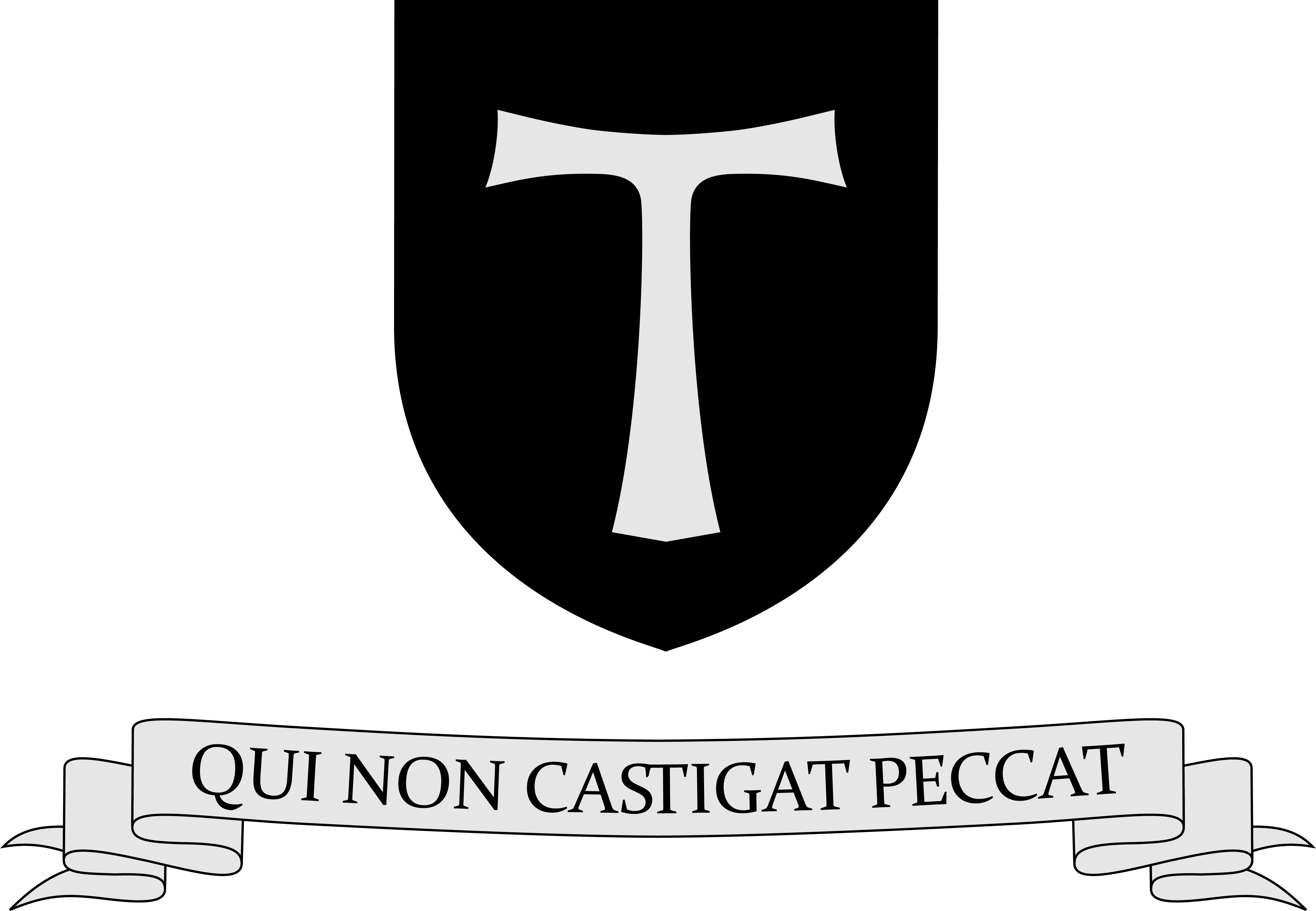

Motto
- Qui Non Castigat Peccat

Translation
- "He who does not chastise, sins"

The Athanasius Center (AC) is a Catholic ministry and ecumenical Christian discussion organization headquartered in Wilmington, North Carolina. Founded on September 10, 2023, by Oliver S. Galbraith and Robert M. Turbeville, the organization describes itself as a "Christian Socratic Seminar" and facilitates weekly dialectical discussions on theology, philosophy, and Christian life among members of multiple Christian denominations.

The organization operates discussion groups in Wilmington, North Carolina; Southport, North Carolina; and Mainz, Germany. While not formally designated as a young adult ministry, participation is primarily composed of adults between the ages of 21 and 35. As of 2026, the organization reports a membership exceeding 150 participants.

== History ==
=== Founding ===
The Athanasius Center was founded in 2023 by Oliver S. Galbraith and Clint Turbeville, both members of Immaculate Conception Catholic Church in Wilmington, North Carolina. The two had previously attended Coastal Christian High School, where they first engaged in dialogue with members of Protestant denominations while bonding over their shared Catholic faith.

According to the organization, the ministry originated from discussions among a small social group consisting of Catholics, Protestants, and Orthodox Christians who sought a dedicated forum for interdenominational dialogue on philosophy, theology, and history. Galbraith and Turbeville later partnered with Father John McGee, O.S.F.S., pastor of Immaculate Conception Catholic Church, to formulate the organization's vision and mission statements.

The organization's vision statement reads:

"Our vision is to connect adults to the life of the parish, to form deeper relationships, and strengthen our beliefs bestowed to us by 'Sacred Tradition, Sacred Scripture and the Magisterium of the Church.'"

Its mission statement states:

"Our mission is to foster fellowship in our parish through dialectical conversations and stewardship forming deeper connections to the Faith through one another."

The organization was originally titled the Young Adult Fellowship Ministry, although it maintained only a minimum age requirement and no formal maximum age limit. The first meeting was held on September 10, 2023, with five attendees consisting of three Catholics and two Orthodox Christians. The topic of the inaugural discussion was "Modesty".

The ministry was later renamed the Athanasius Center in honor of Saint Athanasius. According to the organization, Athanasius was selected as the ministry's patron due to his role in the defense of Nicene orthodoxy, his contributions to Trinitarian theology, his reputation among the Church Fathers for theological argumentation and dialectical engagement, and his recognition as a saint across multiple Christian traditions.

=== Growth ===
Julianna E. Breit joined the organization on November 19, 2023, and later succeeded Clint Turbeville as co-director following his departure from the ministry's leadership. By the first anniversary of the ministry in September 2024, weekly discussions averaged approximately 25 participants, and the organization reported 45 registered members.

Following its first year, the Athanasius Center expanded beyond weekly discussion meetings to include additional ministry activities such as Book Club: Christianity Through the Centuries, Bible Study, Men's Methods of Prayer, and Women's Methods of Prayer.

As participation increased, the discussion format transitioned into breakout groups to accommodate larger attendance. The organization later expanded into additional locations, including Southport, North Carolina, and Mainz, Germany, with some chapters being established by members who had either relocated or regularly traveled long distances to attend meetings in Wilmington.

By 2026, weekly discussions averaged approximately 32 participants per meeting, and the organization reported a membership exceeding 150 participants across its various chapters and ministry activities.

== Organization and principles ==
The Athanasius Center describes itself as a "Catholic intellectual ministry" and "Christian Socratic Seminar" organized around structured dialectical discussion within the life of the parish.

According to the organization's governing norms, all local chapters must operate in association with a Catholic parish and under the authority of the parish pastor. The organization states that it is intended to strengthen parish life rather than function independently of it.

The Athanasius Center emphasizes dialectics as its primary methodological principle, describing discussion as disciplined, rational, and charitable conversation ordered toward truth. The organization states that its discussions are not principally intended as catechesis or evangelization, but as forums for intellectual engagement among Christians of differing denominations.

Organizational Structure
Level	Description
Center	Parent organization
Chapters	Parish-based local chapters
Groups	Discussion Group, Book Club: Christianity Through the Centuries, Bible Study, Men's Methods of Prayer, and Women's Methods of Prayer

The ministry maintains a chapter-based structure in which local chapters may establish sub-ministries and discussion groups while remaining subject to the norms of the parent organization. The weekly Discussion Group is identified by the organization as the primary activity of each chapter.

The organization permits participation from Christians of multiple denominations and states that non-Catholic Christians may serve in leadership roles with the permission of the local parish pastor.
