= De Plancy =

de Plancy is a French toponym, relating to Plancy-l'Abbaye

- Miles de Plancy (d.1174) crusader

There is no aristocratic family "de Plancy," but "de Plancy" was added to the commoner surname Collin by

- Jacques Collin de Plancy:

Also borne by his son:

- Victor Collin de Plancy
