= Gaspard Mermillod =

Swiss Catholic cardinal (1824–1892),

His Eminence Gaspard Mermillod
- Cardinal Bishop of Lausanne and Geneva
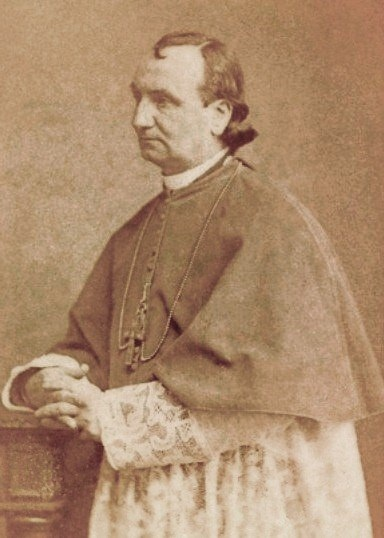
- See: Lausanne and Geneva
- Installed: 15 March 1883
- Term ended: 11 March 1891
- Predecessor: Christophore Cosandey
- Successor: Joseph Déruaz
- Other posts: Auxiliary Bishop of Lausanne and Geneva (25 September 1864 – 15 March 1883); Titular Bishop of Hebron (25 September 1864 – 15 March 1883); Cardinal-Priest of Santi Nereo ed Achilleo (23 June 1890 – 23 February 1892)

Orders
- Ordination: 24 June 1847
- Consecration: 25 September 1864
- Created cardinal: 23 June 1890

Personal details
- Born: Gaspard Mermillod; 22 September 1824 Carouge, Switzerland
- Died: 23 February 1892 (aged 67) Rome, Italy
- Denomination: Roman Catholic Church
- Coat of arms

Styles of Gaspard Mermillod
- Reference style: His Eminence
- Spoken style: Your Eminence
- Religious style: Cardinal
- Posthumous style: not applicable
- Informal style: Cardinal
- See: Lausanne and Geneva, Switzerland (Emeritus)

Gaspard Mermillod (22 September 1824 – 23 February 1892) was a Swiss Cardinal of the Roman Catholic Church. Despite a lengthy investiture conflict with the Calvinist Canton of Geneva, he served as Bishop of Lausanne and Geneva from 1883 to 1891, having previously served as Titular Bishop of Hebron. He was made a cardinal in 1890.

He made major contributions to Catholic social teaching which helped lay the groundwork for Leo XIII's encyclical Rerum novarum.

== Early life and education ==
Gaspard Mermillod was born on 22 September 1824 in Carouge, Switzerland. He was the eldest of six children of Jacques and Pernette (née Mégard) Mermillod, both born of farming families of a neighboring village of Bardonnex. His parents operated an inn and a bakery. Gaspard attended the minor Seminary of Saint-Louis du Mont (1837–1841) at Chambéry, France and studied philosophy and theology at the Jesuit Collège Saint-Michel (1841–1847) at Fribourg, Switzerland.

== Priesthood ==
In June 1847, Mermillod was ordained to the priesthood and was appointed curate in Geneva, where he established two periodicals: L'observateur Catholique and Les Annales Catholiques. He was vicar of the Church of St-Germain in Geneva. In 1857, he became a parish priest and at the same time, Vicar-General of the Bishop of Lausanne for the canton of Geneva. The Church of Notre-Dame in Geneva was built by him from 1851 to 1859.

== Episcopal career (Catholic church) ==
=== Auxiliary Bishop of Lausanne and Geneva ===
Mermillod was appointed Auxiliary Bishop of the Diocese of Lausanne and Geneva and Titular Bishop of Hebron, by Pope Pius IX, on 22 September 1864. He received his episcopal consecration on 25 September 1864. He was especially active for Catholic education, founding with Louis Brisson and Léonie Aviat the Oblate Sisters of St. Francis de Sales at Troyes, for the protection of poor working girls. On 30 October 1868 Leonie, with one of her former boarding school companions, received the habit of this new congregation from Mermillod.

In 1873, Bishop Etienne Marilley of Lausanne and Geneva, renounced the title of the See of Geneva, in the Calvinist Canton of Geneva. With that action, the Holy See, Pius IX, appointed Mermillod as Vicar-Apostolic of Geneva, thus officially detaching the Canton of Geneva from the Diocese of Lausanne and Geneva and making it territory directly under the Papal Authority. As this was not recognized by either the State Council of Geneva or the Swiss Federal Council, Mermillod was forbidden to exercise any episcopal functions and was banished from Switzerland by a decree of 17 February 1873. He then attempted to perform his functions from exile in the nearby French town of Ferney.

In 1879, Marilley resigned his diocese of Lausanne, and Christophore Cosandey, provost at the Seminary in Fribourg, was elected Bishop to a re-unified Diocese of Lausanne and Geneva, while the newly elected Pope Leo XIII ended the Vicariate Apostolic of Geneva. Appeased, the Canton of Geneva lifted its decree against Mermillod.

=== Bishop of Lausanne and Geneva ===
Upon the death of Cosandey in October 1882, Gaspard returned to Switzerland and was appointed Bishop of Lausanne and Geneva on 15 March 1883. The conflict was by no means at an end, for the Canton of Geneva refused to recognize him as bishop. Normal relations resumed only when Leo XIII elevated Mermillod to Cardinal-Priest of Santi Nereo ed Achilleo on 23 June 1890.

Mermillod made major contributions to the Social Doctrine of the Church. Encouraged by his friend René de La Tour du Pin, he founded the Union of Fribourg, which included some of the biggest names in Social Catholicism at the time (Swiss: Gaspard Decurtins; French: René de La Tour du Pin, Albert de Mun, Louis Milcent, and Henri Lorin; Austrian: Karl von Vogelsang and Gustave Blome; German: Franz Kuefstein). Their work on the "social question" form the base of the encyclical of Leo XIII, Rerum novarum.

== Retirement and death ==
In March 1891, Mermillod resigned the pastoral government of the Diocese of Lausanne and Geneva, and Joseph Déruaz was named his successor. Upon this resignation, he relocated to Rome, where he eventually died on 23 February 1892. He was laid in repose, in the church of Ss. Vicenzo ed Anastasio a Trevi and buried in the Carthusian Chapel, Campo Verano cemetery, Rome. His body was eventually transferred, in 1926, to the parish church of Saint-Croix in Carouge. A street in the town of Carouge was named in his honour.

== Works ==
His Lettres à un Protestant sur l'autorité de l'église et le schisme (Paris, 1860) made a great impression. Another important work was his De la vie surnaturelle dans les âmes (Lyons, 1865; Paris, 1881). His collected works were edited by Grospellier (Paris, 1893) in three volumes.

== See also ==
- Etsi multa

Catholic Church titles
Preceded by Bernhard Bogedain	Titular Bishop of Hebron; 1864–1883	Succeeded by Michel Petkoff
Preceded by Christophore Cosandey	Bishop of Lausanne and Geneva; 1883–1891	Succeeded by Joseph Déruaz
Preceded by Alfonso Capecelatro di Castelpagano	Cardinal-Priest of Santi Nereo ed Achilleo; 1890–1892	Succeeded by Luigi Galimberti
