= Leonie Aviat =

French Roman Catholic saint

Saint Léonie Aviat
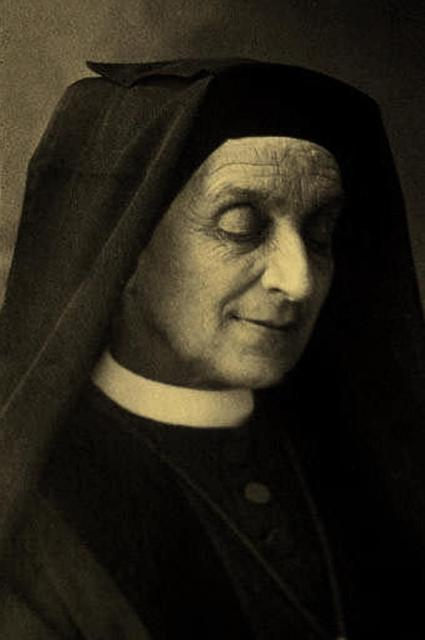
- c. 1895

Virgin
- Born: 16 September 1844; Sézanne, Marne, Kingdom of France
- Died: 10 January 1914 (aged 69); Perugia, Kingdom of Italy
- Venerated in: Roman Catholic Church
- Beatified: 27 September 1992, Saint Peter's Square by Pope John Paul II
- Canonized: 25 November 2001, Saint Peter's Square by Pope John Paul II
- Feast: 10 January
- Patronage: Southwest Marne, Aube, Sézanne

Léonie Aviat (16 September 1844 – 10 January 1914), her religious name Françoise de Sales, was a Roman Catholic professed religious and the co-founder along with Louis Brisson of the Oblate Sisters of St. Francis de Sales.

Aviat served on two occasions as the Superior General for her order though in the interim period between the two terms had to grapple with the disrespect on the part of her two immediate successors. The nun's sole focus was on those seeking work while attempting to fuse work and faith as something inseparable that leads to greater living and working standards as a right and part of human dignities. Aviat was canonized on the 25th of November in 2001.

== Life ==
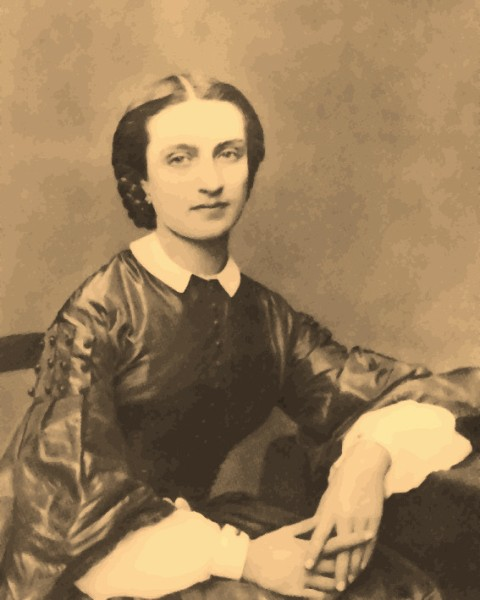
Young Léonie Aviat.

Léonie Aviat was born in Sézanne on 16 September 1844 to shopkeepers Theodore Aviat and Emilie Caillot; she was baptized on 17 September in the local parish church.

When she was eleven, she attended a convent school of the Order of the Visitation of Holy Mary in Troyes as a boarder. While attending the school, she was taught – and received spiritual guidance – from Marie de Sales Chappuis (the superior) and the chaplain Louis Brisson. Aviat received both her First Communion and her Confirmation from Bishop of Troyes, Pierre-Louis Coeur, on 2 July 1856.

Both her parents wanted her to wed a certain rich man, and when Aviat announced her intention to become a religious, her father voiced his opposition. In 1866 she made a spiritual retreat for discernment regarding her future. She approached both Brisson and Chappuis who advised her to wait. This vocation solidified further when she visited one of the factories where glasses were made and repaired in Sézanne: the sight of the workman doing their jobs under their supervisor inspired her to be with them to counsel and guide them towards God while affirming the importance of their work.

Brisson was concerned for the men and women who had moved from the rural areas to the industrialized cities to find work in factories and textile mills. These people were often homeless and so it prompted him to consider the establishment of a new religious congregation dedicated to assist them. He consulted with Aviat, hoping that she would aid him in this endeavor. She began her path to the religious life on 11 April 1866, together with her friend Lucie Caneut, a former boarding school companion. Aviat and Brisson together founded the Oblate Sisters of St. Francis de Sales on 30 October 1868 and to oversee the education of girls.

On 30 October 1868 – with Caneut (who became Jeanne-Marie) – she received the habit of the new congregation from Bishop Gaspard Mermillod, along with the religious name Françoise de Sales. She went on to establish parish schools and a female boarding school in Paris, along with guiding the workers, keeping them employed during the Franco-Prussian War, and aiding Alsacian immigrants following the war's end. Aviat made the profession of her vows on 11 October 1871 to Monsignor de Ségur. She became the first Superior General of this congregation and served two terms in office, the first being from 20 September 1872 until 8 October 1879, when she gladly stepped down. On one occasion in 1873 she was credited with curing the abscessed heel bone of a postulant, using a relic of St. Francis de Sales.

The new Superior General demonstrated a clear lack of respect and consideration for Aviat, which others spoke about. Aviat did not complain nor mention it and offered her interior suffering to God. In 1881 this Superior General resigned after a tenure mired with complications and the new one, Louise-Eugenie, sent Aviat to the French capital of Paris to run a boarding school at Rue de Vaugirad. Aviat earned their respect through commitment to her work. On 15 September 1884 her old friend Jeanne-Marie was appointed as Superior General and her attitude towards Aviat was, surprisingly, rather unpleasant. But Aviat accepted that God had placed the two on opposite sides and spoke little of this to others. In 1889 she was replaced as the head of the Parisian boarding school and returned to Troyes. One night in September 1893 she was in Paris for the order's General Chapter and heard a clear voice stating that she would be chosen as the next Superior General once again. Aviat turned to find she was alone in her room, and the next morning she was re-elected as Superior General, She understood this as a sign that Jesus Christ wanted to govern the order through her. There was an outburst of happiness at her election, as many loved and respected Aviat and her work.

The anti-clerical laws and complete secularization of France in 1905 began with the secularization of the religious houses and the exiling of the occupants. On 11 April 1904 – in preparation of this – she and the other religious transferred their motherhouse to Perugia in Italy to escape the anti-clericalism and remain active, despite not knowing Italian. In 1908 while in her room she had a terrible foreboding that Brisson was nearing the end of her life, and she began to weep. Two religious came to her room and tried to reassure her, but a short while later she received a telegram informing her of his condition. She rushed to his bedside, and the priest died a fortnight later. She attended the funeral though not in her religious habit so as not to draw attention to herself. The constitutions of the order received papal approval from Pope Pius X in April 1911.

On 26 December 1913 she became bedridden with a high fever, that worsened on 9 January 1914 so she received the last rites. She died of bronchopneumonia on 10 January 1914. On 9 April 1961 her remains were removed from their resting place in Perugia to Troyes to the church of Saint Gille that her order managed; her remains were inspected on 11 April 1961 as part of the sainthood process.

== Veneration ==
Aviat's death in 1914 prompted general regard for her as a saint. On 8 July 1936 her spiritual writings were found orthodox. The confirmation of her life of heroic virtue on 1 December 1978 allowed for Pope John Paul II to title her as Venerable. The confirmation of a miracle from South Africa resulted in her beatification. Pope John Paul II beatified Aviat on 27 September 1992. The canonization miracle concerned the cure of Bernadette McKenzie (aged fifteen) from Drexel Hill, PA in the United States of America from paralyzing spinal disease. John Paul II canonized Aviat in Saint Peter's Square on 25 November 2001.

Aviat is a patron saint of Southwest Marne in addition to Aube and Sézanne; she also is a co-patron of the order that she had established.

== Legacy ==
The Mount Aviat Academy in Childs that her order established in 1960 is named in her honor. In Manta in Ecuador the Unidad Educativa Leonie Aviat was created after the order merged the two institutions Santa Esperanza School No. 2 and the Frances de Sales Aviat College.

== Sources ==
- d'Esmonge, OSFS, Sr. Marie-Aimée (1993). Leonie Aviat, Mother Frances de Sales: The Foundress of the Oblates of St. Francis de Sales. Norden: Franz Sales Verlag.
