= Oblate Father =

Oblate Father refers to an Oblate who is a priest, notably as a member of one of the following Catholic orders:

- Missionary Oblates of Mary Immaculate
- Oblate Fathers of St. Francis of Sales
