= St. Francis De'Sales High School, Nagpur, Maharashtra =

Educational institution in Nagpur, India

St. Francis De'Sales High School (SFS School) and Junior College Nagpur is an educational institution in Nagpur, Maharashtra, India. Established in 1870, the school was managed by the Missionaries of St. Francis de Sales. SFS School is governed by the Nagpur Archdiocese. It is located Sadar, Nagpur, Maharashtra.

St. Francis De'Sales High school is currently Headed by Fr. Prashant (Principal). The school was traditionally an all-boys institution until it became a co-educational school in 2008. The school is affiliated to the Maharashtra State Board of Secondary and Higher Secondary Education, Pune, Maharashtra.

== House system ==
The School's house system was introduced by Rev. Fr. Edmond Deage around 1938–39. The houses are named in remembrance of three distinguished former principals and are used to foster competition across academic, literary, and sports fields. Each house has a designated colour and motto:

- Pelvat House (Red) – Motto: "Through difficulties to the heights"
- Coppel House (Blue) – Motto: "Faithful to the end"
- Dufresne House (Green) – Motto: "Duty before pleasure"

The Junior College, which is attached to the school, has a separate house system established by former principal Maurice Fernandes. Its two houses are:

- S.F.S. House – Motto: "Sacrifice before self"
- Don Bosco Hous' – Motto: "Rise and shine".

== History ==
SFS High School was established in 1867 at Kamptee before relocating to its present location in Sadar, Nagpur in 1870. The school's origins trace back to Kamptee, where Fr. Mabboux opened a school in a small room on 4 March 1867, with Br. Alick Rigley as its first Head Master and Nicholas Appao as its first enrolled student. After a new building was constructed in Nagpur by Fr. John Thevenet, Fr. Mabboux moved the institution along with 50 boarders from Kamptee. The school became fully independent in Nagpur on 21 January 1870.

In its early days, the curriculum included Urdu, which was later replaced by Latin, helping to secure a government grant. Under Charles Felix Pelvat, the school was raised to a full-fledged High School, acquired a "First Art" (F.A.) course, and became affiliated with the University of Calcutta. The second floor was built in 1884 to be used as a dormitory. During the tenure of Francis Stephan Coppel in the 1890s and 1900s, the school focused on all-round development, starting a gymnasium, a printing press, science labs, a school band, and music classes.

During the tenure of Ivan Lobo (1995–2007), the school underwent a period of significant renovation and technological upgrade. Through a donation from alumnus Shrikant Jichkar, the school acquired computers and internet access. In 2001–02, the school uniform was changed.

Arpita Mathew took charge in 2007 as the school's first female principal. The most significant change during her tenure occurred in the 2008–09 academic year, when the school, traditionally an all-boys institution, became co-educational. Other changes included introducing navy-blue blazers for staff, adding house-coloured T-shirts for the Saturday uniform. School timings were revised. The foundation stone for a new Primary School building was also laid during this period.

Under Manisha Paul (2013–2017), the new Primary School building was completed and inaugurated in 2013–14 by Archbishop Abraham Viruthakulangara. The campus was further redeveloped by demolishing a fountain at the front gate to create a new parking area and cycle shed.

During the tenure of Prashant Samuel (2017–present), the school continued its modernization. In January 2020, the school inaugurated its Sesquicentennial (150th) Year with a Feast Mass celebrated by Archbishop Elias Gonsalves. Major campus upgrades included replacing the second-floor asbestos roof, renovating the study hall, auditorium, chapel, and both staffrooms, and installing air conditioning.

== List Of principals ==
The following is a list of the principals of the school since its establishment in Nagpur.

No.	Principal	Term
1	Rev. Fr. Francis Mabboux	1870–1873
2	Rev. Fr. Maurice Victor Domenge	1873–1875
3	Rev. Fr. Charles Felix Pelvet	1875–1881
4	Rev. Fr. Etieme Marie Bonaventure	1891–1894
5	Rev. Fr. Francis Stephan Coppel	1894–1907
6	Rev. Fr. Louis Dufresne	1907–1915 & 1919–1927
7	Rev. Fr. Carlo Casimir Fernandes	1915–1919
8	Rev. Fr. Joseph Gros	1927–1937
9	Rev. Fr. Edmond Deage	1937–1951
10	Rev. Fr. Francis D'Souza	1951–1954
11	Rev. Fr. Gerson Mascarenhas	1954–1956
12	Rev. Fr. Cecil De Sa	1956–1960
13	Rev. Fr. Mathew Fernandes	1960–1969 & 1970–1976
14	Rev. Fr. George Vaz	1969
15	Rev. Fr. Oswald D'Souza	1976–1982
16	Rev. Fr. Maurice Fernandes	1982–1995
17	Rev. Fr. Ivan Lobo	1995–2007
18	Rev. Sr. Arpita Mathews	2007–2013
19	Rev. Sr. Manisha Paul	2013–2017
20	Rev. Fr. Prashant Samuel	2017–Present

== Notable alumni ==
A number of the school's alumni have become notable figures, achieving distinction in various national and international fields.

Name	Notability
C. K. Nayudu	First Captain Of The Indian National Cricket Team
Jamshed Jiji Irani	Former Managing Director Of Tata Steel
Rajkumar Hirani	Bollywood writer and director
Tarun Bose	Indian film actor
Harish Salve	Former Solicitor General Of India
Shrikant Jichkar	Writer, ducationist, Politician, Former Home Minister (GoM)
Akash Khurana	Indian actor, screenwriter, director, and author
Sharad Arvind Bobde	47th Chief Justice Of The Supreme Court Of India
Mukul Wasnik	General Secretary, Indian National Congress And Former Union Cabinet Minister
Anees Ahmed	Former Minister (GoM) And Former Member Of The Maharashtra Assembly
