= Louis Brisson =

Roman Catholic Priest

Blessed Louis Brisson OSFS
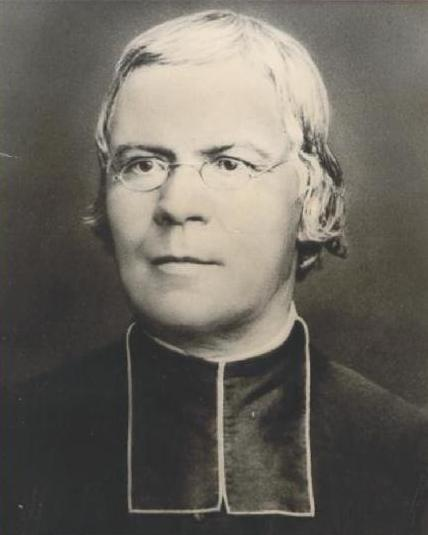
- Photograph sometime between 1870-90.
- Born: 23 June 1817; Plancy, Aube, Kingdom of France
- Died: 2 February 1908 (aged 90); Plancy, Aube, French Third Republic
- Venerated in: Roman Catholic Church
- Beatified: 22 September 2012, Troyes Cathedral, France by Cardinal Angelo Amato
- Feast: 2 February

Louis Brisson, OSFS (23 June 1817 – 2 February 1908) was a French Catholic priest who founded the Oblate Sisters of St. Francis de Sales and the Oblates of St. Francis de Sales.

He founded the female branch alongside Léonie Aviat and the male branch alongside Thérèse Chappuis. Brisson's founding of the congregations stemmed from his desire to improve the working conditions of middle-class girls and to ensure their protection and the promotion of their faith. He was beatified by Pope Benedict XVI in 2012.

== Life ==
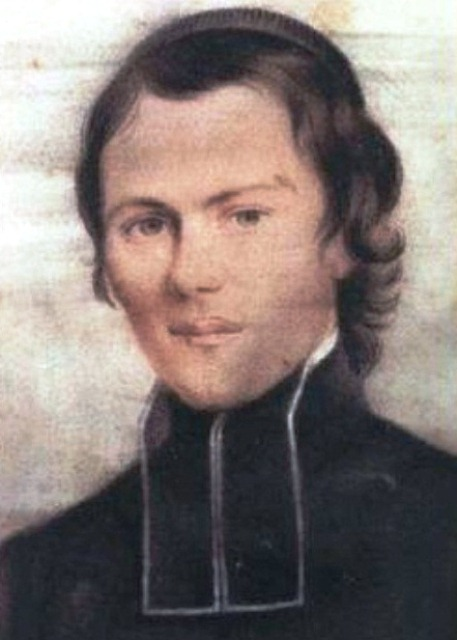
Painting of Fr. Brisson.

Louis Alexander Alphonse Brisson was born on 23 June 1817 in Plancy-l'Abbaye, Aube as the sole child of Toussaint Grégoire Brisson (1785–1875) and Savine Corrard (1795–1881); he was baptized "Louis Alexandre Sosthène" on 29 June in the village parish church.

He received his initial education at home from his parents and the local priest and while being schooled from 1823-31 became interested in the natural sciences. He made his First Communion on 22 March 1829 and that June received his Confirmation.

He desired to become a priest and studied for it from 1831-35 before the reception of the tonsure on 13 July 1835. He continued his studies from 1836-40 before being given the minor orders on 6 July 1838. He was made a sub-deacon in Sens on 25 May 1839 as his own bishop could not do it due to illness. Brisson was elevated into the diaconate on 21 December 1839.

He received his ordination on 18 December 1840 and celebrated his first Mass on 22 December. He received his ordination from Bishop Marie-Joseph-François-Victor Monyer de Prilly because the bishop of his diocese was ill and could not ordain him. On 1 October 1843 he was appointed as the spiritual director for the convent of the Visitation Sisters and did this at the request of the convent's superior Venerable Thérèse Chappuis. In 1858, Bishop Pierre-Louis Coeur appointed Brisson diocesan director of the Catholic Association, intended to defend and spread the faith in Christian countries.

Chappuis was convinced that Brisson would be the priest to establish a religious order of men in the spirit of Francis de Sales. Chappuis soon managed to convince Brisson to establish an order to that design despite the fact that the priest was not enthusiastic about it. In addition to his activities as a priest he served as a teacher to seminarians and continued his interest in natural sciences; this passion saw him construct an astronomical clock used at the motherhouse of the Oblate Sisters of Saint Francis de Sales.

Brisson became concerned with the welfare of the working class girls in the textile mills and so established shelters where those girls could become women of conscience and faith. In 1866 he co-founded (alongside Léonie Aviat) the Oblate Sisters of Saint Francis de Sales to provide for their education; and in August 1875 established the Oblates of Saint Francis de Sales for priests and religious brothers performing similar apostolate work.

Father Brisson met Pope Leo XIII on 6 November 1881 who encouraged his work and encouraged him to send Oblates into the missions. The 1905 legislation on Church-State relations and complete secularization of France saw the secularization of the religious houses which included exiling the occupants. The Oblates of Saint Francis de Sales transferred their General House near Rome but Brisson returned to his birthplace.

Brisson soon became ill due to his advanced age and his condition deteriorated more so after collapsing on 16 January 1908. He was no longer able to receive the Eucharist as of 23 January and was confined to his bed. He lost his speech on 28 January. Léonie Aviat learned of his dire condition from her fellow religious and rushed to his bedside after receiving a formal telegram. The nun was at his bedside for the next fortnight until 2 February 1908 when Brisson died at 10:34am and she attended the funeral on 6 February in which he was buried in his parents' tomb. His remains were later relocated on 10 April 1961 and entombed on 11 April.

== Beatification ==
The informative process for the beatification opened on 11 February 1938 and this was later finished on 15 December 1949. The process for the approval of his spiritual writings began on 22 March 1950, and they were approved on 1 March 1955. The documentation accumulated from these two processes were sent to the Congregation for Rites but were held in Rome until 6 October 1995 when the Congregation for the Causes of Saints validated both processes via a decree. The Positio came to the C.C.S. in 1998 while theologians approved it on 25 November 2005 as did the C.C.S. later on 29 September 2009. Pope Benedict XVI titled Brisson as Venerable on 19 December 2009 after issuing a decree that recognized the late priest lived a model life of heroic virtue according to the cardinal and theological virtues.

The miracle for beatification was investigated in Guayaquil from 20 June 1981 until 27 July 1981 but did not receive formal validation from the C.C.S. until 7 March 2008 at which point a medical panel of experts approved the miracle on 10 February 2011. Theologians likewise approved it on 7 June 2011 as did the C.C.S. members on 13 December 2011. Benedict XVI approved this healing to be a legitimate miracle on 19 December 2011 and thus approved that Brisson would be beatified. Cardinal Angelo Amato presided over the beatification on 22 September 2012 on the pope's behalf; more than 3000 people attended the service with 1500 people watching it on television screens in Brisson's birthplace.

The current postulator for this cause is Madeleine-Thérèse Dechambre.
