= Mount Aviat Academy =

Catholic school in Maryland, United States

Location
- 399 Childs Road; Childs, Maryland 21916-0085; United States; 39°39′11″N 75°51′31″W

Information
- Type: Private
- Motto: Nec Plus Nec Minus (Neither more nor less)
- Religious affiliations: Roman Catholic (Oblate Sisters of St. Francis de Sales)
- Established: 1960
- Principal: Sr. John Elizabeth Callaghan O.S.F.S.
- Grades: Pre-K–8
- Gender: Co-Ed
- Enrollment: approx. 250
- Team name: MAA Knights
- Accreditation: Middle States Association of Colleges and Schools
- Tuition: $5,585 (2016-2017)
- Website: School website

Mount Aviat Academy is a Roman Catholic independent, co-educational school, located in Childs, Maryland, United States. It is run independently within the Roman Catholic Diocese of Wilmington and is operated under the direction of the Oblate Sisters of St. Francis de Sales. The current enrollment is just about 250 students, from Delaware, Maryland, and Pennsylvania. Mount Aviat was selected as a 2014 National Blue Ribbon School of Excellence. This prestigious award is given annually to only 50 private schools nationwide.

== Campus ==
The 25-acre (100,000 m^{2}) campus is home to the school itself as well as a gymnasium, and a convent.

== Athletics ==
Mount Aviat participates in the Diocese of Wilmington's CYM program and compete with other schools in the diocese. The school currently has a boys' basketball team (grades 4-8) and girls' basketball team (grades 4-8), along with a girls' volleyball team (grades 4-8). The teams are coached by parents and the athletic association is also run by the parents.

== History ==
In 1950, with the support of their brother Oblates of St. Francis de Sales, Sister Bertha Gonzaga and her companions journeyed from France to begin a new ministry. In 1952, the sisters converted the donated Cecil County Almshouse and established their convent, naming it “Villa Aviat”. In 1954, the Oblate Sisters' Kindergarten was opened. In 1960, the sisters established an all-girls' boarding high school, naming it Mount Aviat Academy, which operated until 1972, with its last graduating class.

In 1969, the sisters expanded Mount Aviat's kindergarten to include first grade and continued to add a grade level each year until its first group of eighth graders graduated in 1977. In 1979, Mount Aviat expanded to include a Preschool.
