= Marie de Sales Chappuis =

19th-century French nun and foundress

Venerable Marie de Sales Chappuis VHM
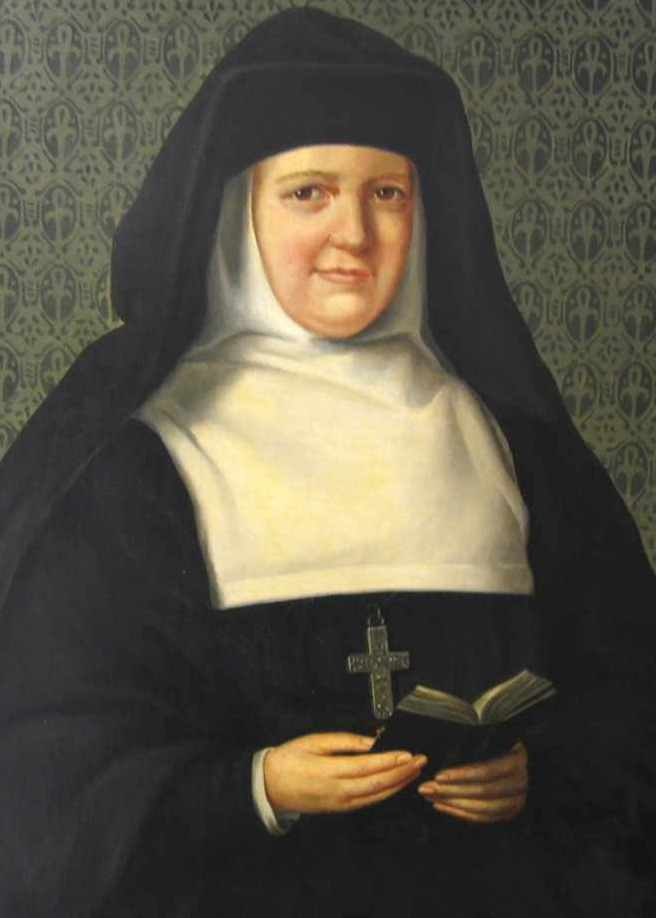
- Marie Chappuis
- Born: Marie-Thérèse Chappuis; 16 June 1793; Soyhières, Canton of Bern, Switzerland
- Died: 7 October 1875; Troyes, Aube, France

Marie de Sales Chappuis, VHM (16 June 1793 in Soyhières, Canton of Bern (now Jura), Switzerland – 7 October 1875 in Troyes, Aube, France) was a Catholic nun and a spiritual leader in the Order of the Visitation of Holy Mary. She also co-founded the congregation of the Oblates of St. Francis de Sales along with Louis Brisson.

The cause for her canonization was introduced at Rome in 1897. She has since been declared Venerable.

== Life ==
=== Childhood ===
Marie-Thérèse Chappuis was born in Soyhières, at that time in the Département du Mont-Terrible in France, on 16 June 1793, to innkeepers, Pierre-Joseph Chappuis (1752–1822) and Marie-Catherine Fleury (died 1837). Her father served in the Cent-Suisses, corps d'infanterie Suisse, attached to the personal guard of the king of France. Her mother was the daughter of François Fleury, Mayor of Soyhières and innkeeper of the village. She was also the niece of Joseph Fleury (1723–1812), the curate of Soyhières. Out of eleven children born of this union, seven entered religion life.

As Marie-Thérèse appeared frail at birth, her mother wished her baptized, but due to the French Revolution there was no priest in Soyhières. An uncle carried the newborn in a market basket two miles over the mountain to the village of Petit-Lucelle, outside the jurisdiction of Revolutionary forces.

Marie-Thérèse received her sacrament of First Communion in 1802. At the age of fourteen, she entered the Visitation Convent at Fribourg as an boarding student. She remained two years. Although the Visitandines were a cloistered order, the nuns provided an excellent education for girls at the schools attached to their monasteries.

=== Religious vows ===
In June 1811, she returned to the convent as a postulant, but left it again in three months after a severe bout of home sickness. Three years later she came back and received the religious habit on 3 June 1815. Marie-Thérèse took the religious name of Marie-Françoise de Sales at her profession on 9 June 1816. She steeped herself in the writings of Francis de Sales and later exclaimed that she found everything she needed and wanted in his writings. From reading De Sales, Marie-Thérèse Chappuis came to see no necessary contradiction between the active and contemplative life. A year after taking her vows she was sent to Metz, but reasons of health compelled her to return to Fribourg. At a relatively young age, she was appointed novice mistress at Fribourg.

In 1826, she was elected superior of the monastery at Troyes, where she initiated the practice of the "Spiritual Directory of St. Francis de Sales", which counseled living in the present moment and doing all that is pleasing to God.

In 1833, she spent six months in the second monastery in Paris, where she was superior (1838–44). Here, a priest by the name of Beaussier wished to establish clubs or meeting places for young men entering the work force, in order to provide a healthy Christian environment. Chappuis assisted with material and financial resources. She set up similar places for young women in Troyes.

=== Foundress ===
As it became increasingly difficult to staff these facilities with only volunteers, Chappuis and Brisson decided to found a religious community. Leonie Aviat, and Lucie Canuet, graduates of the Visitation School in Troyes, were the first candidates.

The greater part of Chappuis' life was spent at Troyes, where she was elected superior eleven times, and where she celebrated, in 1866, the golden anniversary of her religious profession. While superior at Troyes, she encouraged the monastery chaplain, Louis Brisson, to start a religious order of men to follow the spiritual legacy of Francis de Sales. "What you are doing is, of course, very good, but what you are going to do will have much greater results."

Chappuis became ill in September 1875 and died at the monastery of the Visitation of Holy Mary in Troyes on 7 October 1875.

=== Teaching ===
Marie de Sales is celebrated chiefly for her zeal in spreading a certain kind of spirituality which she called "The Way" (La Voie). This is a reference to John 14:6, "Jesus saith unto him, I am the way, and the truth, and the life: no one cometh unto the Father, but by me." Her principal biographer, Louis Brisson, who had been for thirty years confessor to the Visitandines of Troyes, and was her spiritual director, writes that by this expression – La Voie – "she understood a state of soul which consisted in depending upon the actual will of God, relishing whatever was His good pleasure, and imitating the life of the Saviour externally". The English edition of her life (London, 1900), in translating this sentence, overlooks the word actuelle (actual): "What did the good Mother mean by this Word, 'The Way'? She meant a state of soul which consists in an entire dependence on the Will of God, by an interior consent to all that is according to His good pleasure, and an exterior imitation of our Saviour."

== Veneration ==
The cause for her canonization was introduced at Rome in 1897.

== Sources ==
- Pensées de la ven. Mère Marie de Sales (Paris, 1897);
- Fragnière, La Voie: sermon preached at Fribourg, 19 November 1897 (Paris, 1898);
- Watrigant, Une nouvelle école de spiritualité in Etudes religieuses (Paris, June, 1899);
- Fragnière, Réponse au Rd. Watrigant et justification de la voie de charité de la vénérée Mère Marie de Sales Chappuis (Fribourg, 1900);
- Watrigant, Les deux méthodes de spiritualité (Lille, 1900);
- Hagen, Die ehw. Mutter Marie von Sales Chappuis in Sendbote des gottlichen Herzens Jesu (Cincinnati, 1900); Méthodes de spiritualité in Ami du clergé (6 February 1902);
- Gortet, Lettre sur les vies de la V. Mère Chappuis (12 January 1887), see Revue des sciences ecclésiastigues (Lille, September, 1900), 260;
- Chollet, La cause de béatification de la Mère Marie de Sales Chappuis (on the decision concerning the Writings of the venerable mother) in the same review (July, 1902);
- Watrigant, L'Ecole de la spiritualité simplifiée (Lille, 1903);
- Il modernismo ascetico in Civiltà Cattolica (8 May 1908);
- Chollet, L'ascétique moderniste in Questions ecclésiastiques (Lille, June, July, August, 1909).
