= Apostolic Vicariate of Orange River =

The Vicariate Apostolic of Orange River (Latin: Vicariatus Apostolicus Fluminis Orangensis) was a Roman Catholic missionary jurisdiction located in part of South Africa.

== History ==
The Apostolic vicariate was erected as such in 1897 after having been a prefecture Apostolic since 20 June 1885. It comprised the whole of Little Namaqualand (beginning on the northern line of Clan William County in Cape Colony, i. e. 30° 35′ S. lat.); extending to the Atlantic Ocean on the west and to the Orange River on the north. It further included Bushmanland, the districts of Kenhardt, Van Rhyns, Dorp and Frazerburg on the east, and beyond the Orange River the district of Gordonia in Bechuanaland.

The prefecture, detached from the vicariate in July, 1909, was bounded on the west by the Atlantic Ocean, extending from the Orange River as far as Damaraland (23° 20′ S. lat.), and comprises the city of Rehboth and its district. The eastern boundary line is 20° E. long.

On July 9, 1940, it was renamed as Apostolic Vicariate of Keimoes.

On January 11, 1951, it was promoted as Roman Catholic Diocese of Keimoes. On February 8, 1985, it was given its present name: Diocese of Keimoes – Upington.

== The lands ==
=== Great Namaqualand ===
For thirty or forty, or in certain districts even a hundred miles inland, the Great Namaqualand district is only a sandy desert, which extends on the eastern side to the great Kalahari desert. The central portion depends for its fertility almost exclusively on thunder-storms, without which it would be nearly destitute of water. The vicariate is but little better in this respect. But when a sufficiently long rain waters these forlorn regions, the richest pastures spring up in an incredibly short time as the air becomes saturated to such a degree with the odour of vegetation that many suffer from headache. Swarms of locusts devour the exuberant produce, unless some powerful east wind carries them into the sea.

In the early 20th century, the population of the Vicariate was largely Khoikhoi with small numbers of German, English, Irish, and Boer settlers. Early Catholic missionaries to the area recounted difficulties in explaining Catholic doctrines to the natives.

=== Bushmanland ===
In this territory are found the San people.

=== Bechuanaland ===
The Bechuanas belong to the Tswana people.

== Missions ==
When the Oblates of St. Francis de Sales arrived in Little Namaqualand, to which the mission was then confined, they found not one hundred Catholics. In 1903, without any change of population, they counted 2735. There were six stations with churches and resident priests, five other stations regularly attended, 125 conversions during the year and 98 children baptized; 122 confirmations, 25 marriages; 3 hospitals and homes for the aged, 8 schools, 3 orphanages, 82 orphans, 8 missionary priests, 3 catechists; 15 missionary sisters aided the mission. Some fifty places were visited by the priests to attend to the spiritual and temporal wants of the people. In several places, all Catholic adults received Holy Communion on the first Friday of every month and the great feasts of the year.

Sella was the residence of the vicar Apostolic and Hierachalis that of the prefect Apostolic. These results were most encouraging, considering the great difficulties confronting the missionaries. In 1909 the approximate statistics for the two missions were: 1 bishop; 14 priests; 3 catechists; 22 missionary sisters; 480 children in Catholic schools; 175 baptisms of children, 315 baptisms of adults. In Little Namaqualand the natives understood Dutch (rather Afrikaans) or English; but in Great Namaqualand, besides German, the missionaries had to learn Khoekhoe, which they found difficult because of its clicks.
