= Diocese of Hebron =

Former episcopal see in Palestine

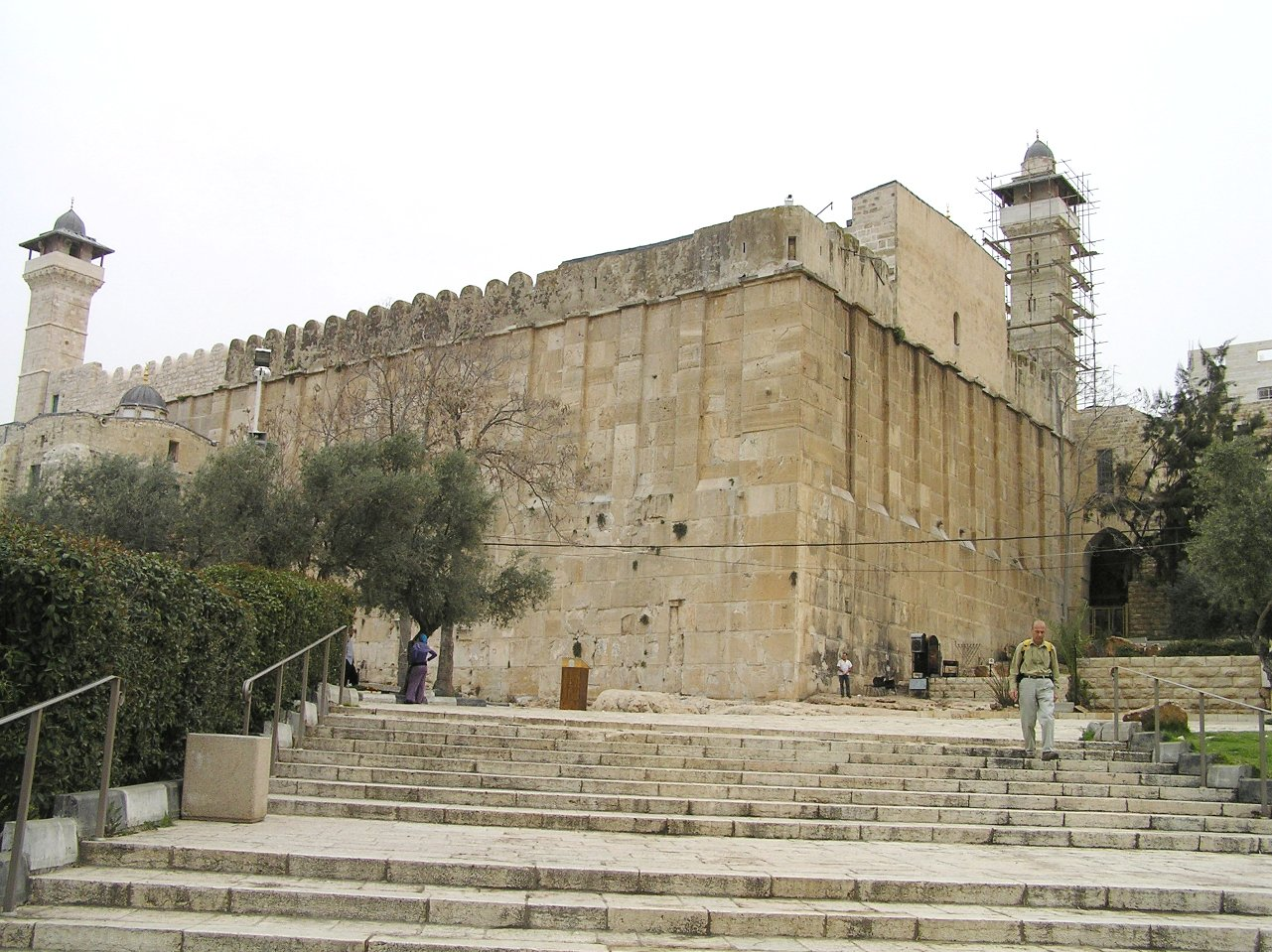
Cavern of the Patriarchs, Hebron

Hebron was an episcopal see during the Crusader period.

== History ==
Eusebius (fourth century) calls Hebron merely as a large hamlet. It contains the tomb of the patriarchs, mentioned by Josephus, by Eusebius, and by the Pilgrim of Bordeaux in 333.

Crusaders took the town in 1100, and the sanctuary became the church of Saint Abraham, also called the church of the Holy Cave (Sancta Caverna or Spelunca, ’ágion spelaîon). The town itself is often styled by the chroniclers of that period Castel Saint-Abraham, Præsidium or Castellum ad Sanctum Abraham. A priory of Canons Regular of St. Augustine was installed to take charge of the basilica.

In 1167 Hebron became a Latin see; its first titular was Rainaldus (1167–1170), nephew of the patriarch Foucher.

A letter of Pope Clement IV, dated 1 June 1267, orders the Patriarch of Jerusalem to supply the church of Hebron with a priest. After Geoffrey (Gaufridus), O.P., 1273–1283, the bishops of Hebron were merely titulars, and a great confusion existed in their list.

As a residential see, Hebron enjoyed a very brief existence. However it survived the triumph of Saladin in 1187, and the march of the Khwarezmians in 1244. Saladin, after the victory at Hattin (4 July 1187), and that at Ascalon (5 September), hastened, before marching on Jerusalem, to occupy Hebron, and to associate the sanctuary of Abraham with the worship of Islam. The Khwarezmians destroyed the town, but did not touch the sanctuary.

The Greeks, after the departure of the Latins, retained for a time a residing bishop in Hebron. Lequien mentions one of these bishops, Joannikios, whose name appears with that of Christodoulos of Gaza in the Acts of the Council of Jerusalem in 1672 under the title of Ioannikíou toû theophilestátou ’archiepiskópou toû ‘agíon spelaíon (Joannikios, most holy Archbishop of the holy Cave).

=== Titular see ===
In modern times, it was revived as a titular see; Cardinal Mermillod and Michael Petkov, Vicar Apostolic of the Uniat Bulgarians in Thrace, were titular bishops.
