= Sézanne =

- Commune
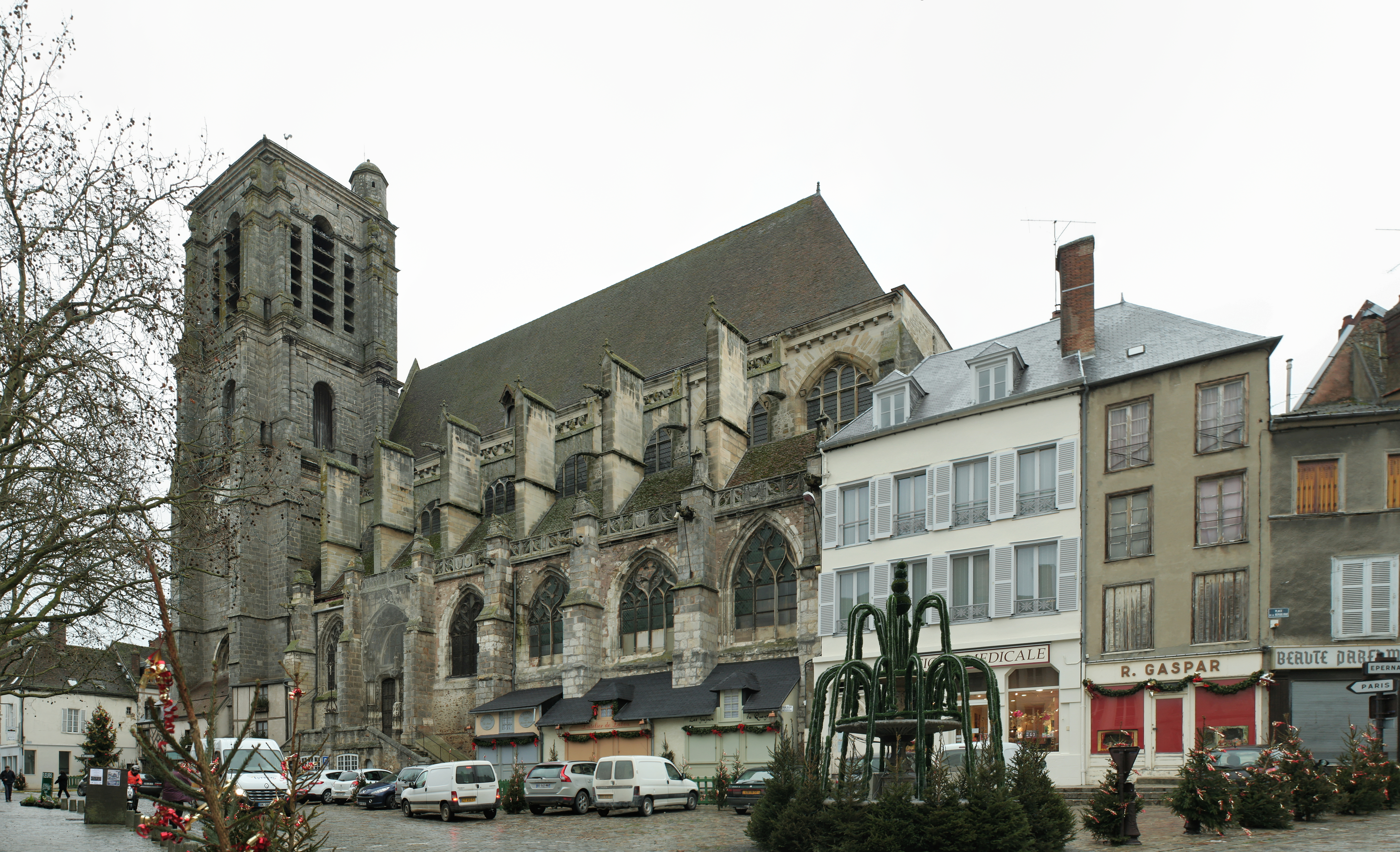
- Church of Saint Denis

- Coat of arms
- Location of Sézanne
- Location within France Location within Grand Est
- Coordinates: 48°43′11″N 3°43′25″E
- Country: France
- Region: Grand Est
- Department: Marne
- Arrondissement: Épernay
- Canton: Sézanne-Brie et Champagne
- Intercommunality: CC Sézanne-Sud Ouest Marnais

Government
  - Mayor (2020–2026): Sacha Hewak
- Area^{1}: 22.82 km^{2} (8.81 sq mi)
- Elevation: 148 m (486 ft)
- Population (2023): 4,576
  - Density: 200.5/km^{2} (519.4/sq mi)
- Time zone: UTC+01:00 (CET)
  - Summer (DST): UTC+02:00 (CEST)
- INSEE/Postal code: 51535 /51120
- ^{1} French Land Register data, which excludes lakes, ponds, glaciers > 1 km^{2} (0.386 sq mi or 247 acres) and river estuaries.

Sézanne (French pronunciation: [sezan]) is a commune in the Marne department and Grand Est region in north-eastern France. Its inhabitants are called Sézannais.

The commune is listed as a Village étape.

== Population ==
Historical population
Year	Pop.	±% p.a.
1968	5,727	—
1975	6,201	+1.14%
1982	6,048	−0.36%
1990	5,829	−0.46%
1999	5,585	−0.47%
2007	5,232	−0.81%
2012	5,160	−0.28%
2017	4,834	−1.30%
2023	4,576	−0.91%
Source: INSEE

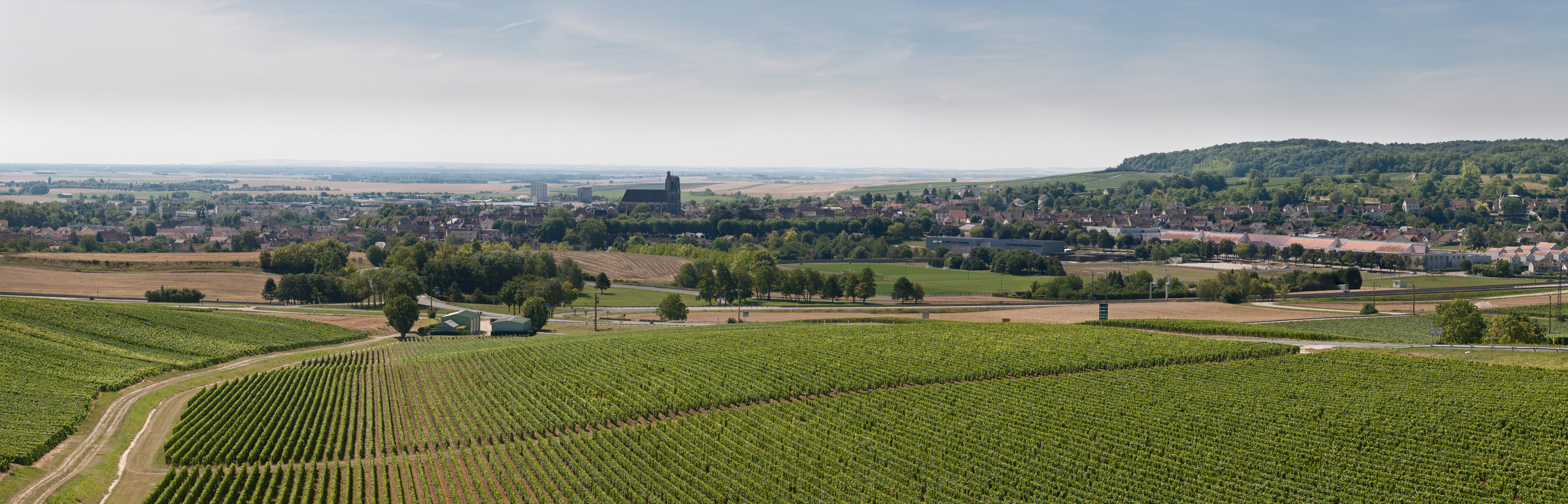
A panoramic view

== Notable people ==
- Leonie Aviat, Saint
- Floresca Guépin (1813–1889), feminist, teacher, school founder
- Raymond Marcellin, Politician

== See also ==
- Communes of the Marne department
