= Missionaries of St. Francis de Sales =

Roman Catholic religious congregation

The Missionaries of St. Francis de Sales (MSFS), also known as the Fransalians, were founded in Annecy, France on 24 October 1838 by Peter Mermier under the patronage of the Savoyard bishop Francis de Sales (1567-1622). Mermier felt that the political disturbances of the French Revolution had left the French people in spiritual crisis, and took up preaching parish missions in the hope of bringing about spiritual renewal. This special apostolate in turn gave rise to a community of preachers gathered around him.

== History ==
The order was founded in response to the desire of Francis de Sales to found a society of missionary priests. Nearly two centuries after de Sales's death, Joseph Rey, his successor in the See of Annecy, broached the subject of such a society to Peter Mermier, who had been considering the same idea. Accordingly, Mermier put the design into execution.

In 1830 the institute was formed with La Feuillette, in Annecy, as the site for its mother-house. This was solemnly blessed by the bishop on 8 August 1837, and the congregation canonically instituted by him on 8 October 1838. The society was not to be a mere association of priests, but a new religious congregation, bound by simple vows. Hence Mermier, the first superior-general, offered himself and his companions to the Pope for foreign missions. In 1845 his offer was accepted by Congregation for the Evangelization of Peoples, and the first missionaries of St. Francis de Sales set out for India.

The superiors-general during the early years of the society, after Peter Mermier, were Fathers Gaiddon, Clavel, Tissot, Gojon, and Bouvard.

The work has prospered and since that time more than 100 priests and seminarians have been sent out by the congregation, besides many lay brothers. More than 200 nuns of different orders have gone out at the call of the missionaries to help them. The first batch of the Fransalians (MSFS) landed in Pondichery on 8 September 1845 and the first batch of the Fransalians reached Visakhapatnam on 19 February 1846. The Congregation for the Evangelization of Peoples entrusted the Vicariate of Visakhapatnam to the Fransalians on 2 May 1848. Until 1888 there was only one region of the Fransalians in India: Visakhapatnam Region. In 1888 Nagpur region was created by bifurcating the Visakhapatnam region. Both were raised to the status of province in 1965.

The dioceses of Nagpur and Visakhapatnam have always been governed by prelates belonging to this institute. In Visakhapatnam the first vicar apostolic was Neyret (1850); he was succeeded by Tissot, first bishop of the diocese. The first bishop of Nagpur was Riccaz; after him came Pelvat, a great supporter of the Indian way of religious life and Indian theology developed by Brahmabandhab Upadyay (1861 -1907), followed by Crochet, Bonaventure, and Coppel.

== Geographical organisation ==
The Fransalians in France and Switzerland were directly under the Superior General until 1959. It became a region in 1960 and a province in 1965.

The Fransalians went to England in 1861. England became a region of the Fransalians in 1940 and a province in 1965. In England the Fransalians have three missions in the Diocese of Clifton. Since the persecution of 1903, the congregation has been obliged to leave Savoy for England, where the juvenate, the novitiate, and the house of studies were successfully carried on.

The mission in Brazil was begun in 1926. The Province of Brazil was established in 1965.

In 1975 the Fransalians of the Visakhapatnam Province entered the North-East India for evangelization. In 1984 the vice-province of NE India was erected and later in 1990 it was raised to the status of a province.

Following the original vision of Mermier, the Fransalians entered the African Continent in 1988. The mission began in Tanzania and the Province of East-Africa, comprising Tanzania, Kenya and Uganda, was established in 1996.

An autonomous American Mission in the US was founded in 1990 and later raised to the status of a Region under the Superior General on 3 July 2007.

The South-West India Province was established in 1991 bifurcating the Visakhapatnam Province. The Visakhapatnam Province was further divided to form the Tamil Nadu - Pondichery region under the Visakhapatnam Province on 24 January 2005. Three years later this region was raised to the status of a Province with a new name, Chennai Province, on 24 January 2008. In the same year, on 15 August 2008, it was renamed as South-East Province. The Nagpur Province was established in 1965 and was later renamed Maharashtra-Goa Province. It was bifurcated in 1996 and the present Nagpur and Pune provinces were erected.

The congregation's generalate is now in Rome.

== Sources ==
- "Missionaries of St.Francis de Sales: Some Important Dates" in Missionariorum Sancti Franscisci Salesii Status 2012
- "Fransalians", Devasia Manalel MSFS in A Concise Encyclopedia of Christianity in India, 2014, pp. 396 –398
- Duval, Adrien. Monsieur Mermier 1790 - 1862: Founder of Two Religious Congregations, Bangalore: SFS Publications, 1985
- Moget, Francis. Early Days of the Visakhapatnam Mission 1846 - 1920), Bangalore: IIS Publications, 1997
- Kuzhuppil, Devasia, Visakhapatnam Province, Bangalore: SFS Publications, 1990
- Mookenthottam, Antony, 150 Years MSFS on Indian Soil:1845 -1995, Bangalore: SFS Publications, 1996
