= Oblates of St. Francis de Sales =

Male Roman Catholic religious congregation

- Abbreviation: O.S.F.S.
- Formation: 21 December 1875; 150 years ago
- Type: Roman Catholic religious order
- Headquarters: Generalate
- Location: Rome, Italy
- Superior General: Barry Strong, O.S.F.S.
- Key people: Louis Brisson—founder; Marie de Sales Chappuis—founder
- Website: www.desalesoblates.org

The Oblates of St. Francis de Sales (Latin: Oblati Sancti Francisci Salesii, O.S.F.S.) are a congregation of Catholic priests and brothers who follow the teachings of Francis de Sales and Jane Frances de Chantal. The community was founded in Troyes in 1875 by Louis Brisson and are affiliated with the Oblate Sisters of St. Francis de Sales.

== History ==
=== Foundation ===
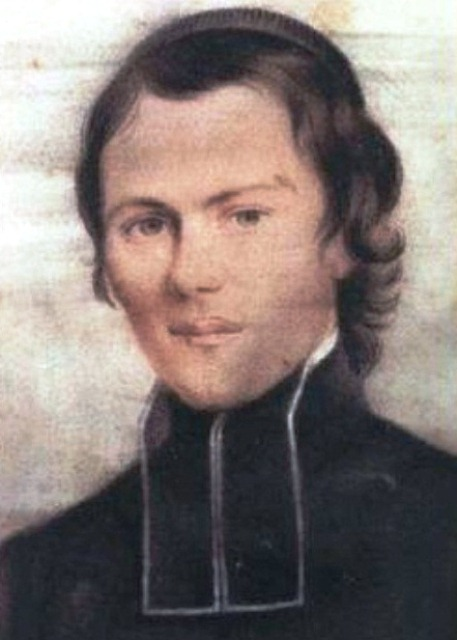
Louis Brisson

An order of cloistered nuns, the Order of the Visitation of Holy Mary, was founded by Francis de Sales at the request of Jane Frances de Chantal in 1610. The establishment of an Oratory at Thonon, where Francis served as the first Provost, was a preparatory step toward carrying out his design, the accomplishment of which was prevented by his death. With Chantal's encouragement and assistance, Raymond Bonal of Adge, in France, carried out his plan, but this congregation died out at the beginning of the 18th century. Two hundred years later it was revived by Marie de Sales Chappuis (died 7 October 1875) and Louis Brisson, a professor in the Seminary of Troyes. In 1869, Brisson established Saint Bernard Collège, near Troyes. In September 1871, a priest by the name of Gilbert (died 10 November 1909) joined him and Emmanuel-Jules Ravinet, Bishop of Troyes, received them and four companions into the novitiate.

Pope Pius IX temporarily approved their constitutions on 21 December 1875. The first vows were made 27 August 1876. The definitive approbation of their constitution was given on 8 December 1897.

=== Development ===
The congregation gradually developed in France. It numbered seven colleges and five other educational houses when the Government closed them all, 31 July 1903. The founder retired to Plancy where he died 2 February 1908. The Generalate was transferred to Rome, and in 1909, the church of Sts. Celsus and Julian in was entrusted to them. Oblate refers to persons, especially in the Middle Ages, who offered themselves and their property to a monastery.

== Today ==
The members of this religious order are of two states, clerics and lay brothers. Today the Oblates are located throughout the world, in Holland, Germany, Austria, France, Switzerland, Italy, India, South Africa, Namibia, Benin, Ivory Coast, Uruguay, Brazil, Ecuador, Mexico, Haiti and the United States. The Generalate is located in Rome.

The order is governed by a superior general elected every six years; and four counsellors general elected by the general chapter. Each province is administered by a provincial superior, appointed by the superior general and his council for four years. He is assisted by three counsellors elected at each provincial chapter, which meets every four years, at an interval of six years between the regular general chapters.

=== Apostolate ===
Oblates engage in a wide variety of areas of service. Oblates are apostolates of education, parish work and foreign missions. They also work as teachers at religious and secular colleges and missionary areas as well as serving in military, campus, hospital, and convent chaplaincies and in inner-city social work.

=== Formation ===
The Oblates of St. Francis de Sales offer an Associate Program, designed to help young men discern a possible call to religious life and priesthood during their college years. The Postulate period lasts for a year, during which the candidate with and participates in the life of an Oblate community, in order to smooth the transition from his present lifestyle to Oblate community living. The one-year Novitiate is taken up with studies, particularly Salesian spirituality. For the first three years following first vows, Oblate renew their vows annually, and then profess perpetual vows. Generally, a Ministerial Internship takes place after the novitiate. Candidates for ordination pursue further studies in academic, professional and pastoral education.

In the early 20th century they had the following membership:

In Walmer (Kent, England) they operated a boarding school for boys, the chaplaincy of the Visitation Convent and Academy of Roselands and a small parish in Faversham. To this province belonged the Apostolic Vicariate of Orange River.

== In Africa ==
When the Vicar Apostolic of Cape of Good Hope, John Leonard, heard that the Society of African Missions of Lyons had decided to recall its subjects from Namaqualand and the North Western Cape, he made a trip to Europe in 1880 in hopes of finding a Congregation willing to assume the responsibility of evangelizing these districts. In 1881, Brisson spoke with Pope Leo XIII and accepted a foreign mission to South Africa which put the governance of the Oblates under the Pope through the Propagation of the Faith. Brisson sent five missionary priests in 1882, to fulfill Leonard's request. South Africa Missions were founded in Pella in 1882, Matjieskloof in 1885, Nababeep in 1900, O'kiep in 1904, and Port Nolloth in 1904. Namibia Missions were founded in Heirachabies in 1896, Warmbad in 1907, and Gabis in 1907.

== In North America ==
In 1893, the first Oblate priest arrived in the United States to serve as chaplain for the Sisters of the Divine Compassion, a religious community founded in 1886 in the Archdiocese of New York by Mary Dannat Starr and Thomas S. Preston. In 1903, the first English speaking province was established in Wilmington, Delaware, as was Salesianum School, a high school for boys.

In 1906, the order expanded by purchasing a 210-acre farm, at the edge of Childs, a village in northeastern Maryland. On the rolling hillside near the B & O Railroad, they had convenient access to nearby Wilmington. Once the buildings went up and the "Novitiate of the Oblate Farthers of St. Francis de Sales" was dedicated on October 6, 1907, a local newspaper reported. Today, the property is used by the order as a retirement facility.

After early years of modest expansion, the American Province flourished during the 1940s and 1950s with many vocations from schools it conducted in the Wilmington, Philadelphia, Toledo, Detroit, and Niagara Falls, New York, areas. DeSales Spirituality Services is a web based ministry of the Wilmington-Philadelphia Province offering resources in spirituality. As of 2017, there were 145 priests, brothers and seminarians in the Wilmington-Philadelphia Province.

In 1966, the American Province was split into the Wilmington-Philadelphia Province, which encompassed the eastern and southern states, and the Toledo-Detroit Province, which encompassed the central and western states.

=== Child abuse ===
McCartney v. Oblates of St. Francis De Sales was a court case appealed to the Ohio Court of Appeals in which a former teacher at St. Francis de Sales High School in Toledo, Ohio sued the principal and a student advisor for slander. In 1983, the teacher was convicted of contributing to the delinquency of a minor by providing alcohol to one of his students. Although his contract was subsequently not renewed, the teacher, a former yearbook advisor, remained in touch with the yearbook staff. On a subsequent yearbook "overnight", it was reported to the faculty advisor that his predecessor had been seen drinking beer in the school parking lot with two students and that they subsequently left the premises. The faculty adviser conveyed this information to the students' parents, along with information regarding the previous conviction. The former teacher sued the school for slander. The lower court found in favor of the school and the appellate affirmed court.

In 2015, James Roth, an Oblate priest, admitted that he perpetrated child sexual abuse in Ohio.

James Francis Rapp, an Oblate priest, was convicted in 1999 in Oklahoma and 2016 in Michigan of child sexual abuse.

== Wilmington/Philadelphia Province ==
- Bishop Ireton High School – Alexandria, Virginia (formerly staffed by the Oblates of St. Francis de Sales)
- Saint Paul VI High School – Fairfax, Virginia (formerly staffed by the Oblates of St. Francis de Sales)
- DeSales University – Center Valley, Pennsylvania
- Northeast Catholic High School – Philadelphia, Pennsylvania (merged into Father Judge after 2010 school year)
- Father Judge High School – Philadelphia, Pennsylvania
- Nativity Preparatory School – Wilmington, Delaware
- Salesianum School – Wilmington, Delaware

== Toledo/Detroit Province ==
- DeSales Catholic High School – Lockport, New York (formerly staffed by the Oblates)
- Judge Memorial Catholic High School – Salt Lake City, Utah (formerly staffed by the Oblates)
- Lumen Christi Catholic High School – Jackson, Michigan
- St. Francis de Sales High School – Toledo, Ohio
- St. Mary's High School – Stockton, California
