= Jane Frances de Chantal =

French Roman Catholic saint (1572–1641)

Saint Jane Frances de Chantal VSM
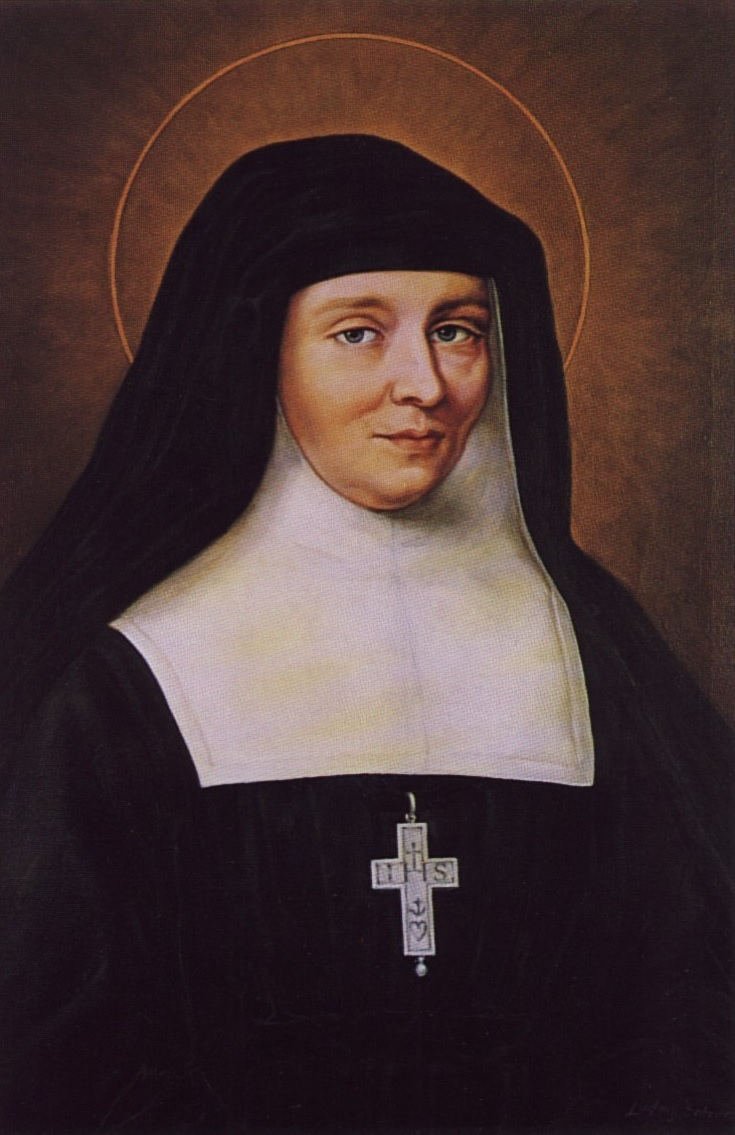

Foundress
- Born: 28 January 1572; Dijon, Burgundy, France
- Died: 13 December 1641 (aged 69); Moulins, France
- Venerated in: Roman Catholic Church; Anglican Communion
- Beatified: 21 November 1751, Rome by Pope Benedict XIV
- Canonized: 16 July 1767, Rome by Pope Clement XIII
- Major shrine: Annecy, Savoy
- Feast: 12 August; 21 August (General Roman Calendar 1769-1969); 12 December (General Roman Calendar 1970-2001, Episcopal Church)
- Attributes: Black religious habit with a silver cross necklace
- Patronage: forgotten people; in-law problems; loss of parents; parents separated from children; widows

Jane Frances de Chantal VSM, born Jeanne-Françoise Frémyot, Baroness of Chantal (French: [ʒan fʁɑ̃swaz fʁemjo]; 28 January 1572 – 13 December 1641), was a French Catholic noble widow and nun who was beatified in 1751 and canonized in 1767. She founded the Order of the Visitation of Holy Mary. The religious order accepted women who were rejected by other orders because of poor health or age.

When people criticized her, Chantal famously said, "What do you want me to do? I like sick people myself; I'm on their side." During its first eight years, the new order also was unusual in its public outreach, in contrast to most female religious orders who remained cloistered and adopted strict ascetic practices.

== Biography ==
Jane Frances de Chantal was born in Dijon, France, on 28 January 1572, the daughter of the royalist president of the Parliament of Burgundy, Bénigne Frémyot and his wife, Margaret de Berbisey. Her paternal uncle was the prior at Val des Choux. Her brother André became the Archbishop of Bourges (1602–1621).

Her mother died when Jane was 18 months old. Her father became the main influence on her education. She developed into a woman of beauty and refinement.

=== Baroness ===
Having turned down two prior suitors, in 1592, she married the Baron de Chantal when she was 20 and they lived in the feudal Castle of Bourbilly. There they hosted hunting parties and other entertainments for the neighboring nobles. Their first two children died shortly after birth. When her older sister Margaret died, the baroness brought her three small children to Bourbilly. She and her husband subsequently had a son and three daughters. Baron de Chantal was occasionally away from home on service to the king. Jane gained a reputation as an excellent manager of the estates of her husband, as well as of her difficult father-in-law, while also providing alms and nursing care to needy neighbors.

In 1601, the Baron was accidentally killed in a hunting accident. Left a widow at 28, with four children, the broken-hearted baroness took a vow of chastity. Jane then put the estate in order and acceded to her father's request that she and her children stay for a time with him in Dijon. She had not long returned to Bourbilly when she received a letter from her widowed father-in-law demanding that she live with him in his castle at Monthelon, Saône-et-Loire. Towards the end of 1602, Chantal closed up Bourbilly and moved to Monthelon.

=== Francis de Sales ===
In 1604, her father invited her to come to Dijon to hear the bishop of Geneva, Francis de Sales, preach the Lenten sermons at the Sainte Chapelle. They became close friends and de Sales became her spiritual director. He "...bade her avoid scruples, hurry, and anxiety of mind, which above all things hinder a soul on the road to spiritual perfection." At de Sales' suggestion, she divided her time between Dijon and Monthelon so to attend to both her father and father-in-law.

In 1605, Pierre de Bérulle sent Anne of Jesus to found a Carmelite house in Dijon. Jane wanted to become a nun but he persuaded her to defer this decision. As for her request to perform additional austerities, de Sales was firm in advising between seven and eight hours sleep. In 1610 Chantal's daughter, Marie Aymée, married de Sales's youngest brother, Bernard. Shortly after this, Jane's youngest daughter, Charlotte, died of an illness. With the death of de Sales' mother, Jane moved to Annecy to be of assistance to Marie Aymée with her remaining daughter Françoise. Her fifteen-year-old son, Celse Bénigne, lived with his grandfather in Dijon.

=== Nuns of the Visitation ===
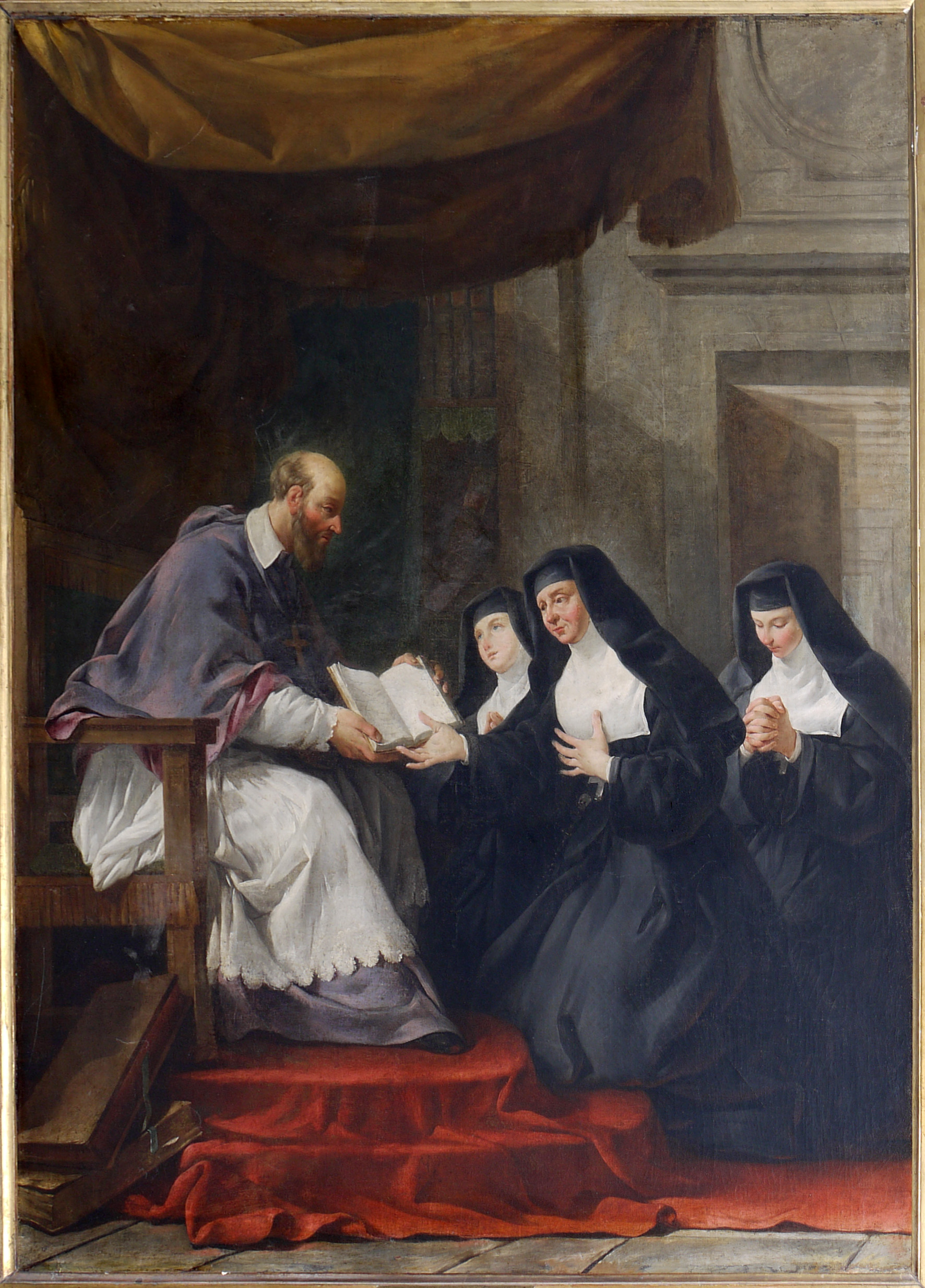
Saint Francis de Sales giving Saint Jeanne de Chantal the rule of the Order of the Visitation of Holy Mary.

De Sales purchased a small house on Lake Annecy, where Jane was joined by Marie Favre, daughter of president of Savoy, and Charlotte de Bréchard (Breschard), whom de Sales had also recruited. The Congregation of the Visitation was canonically established at Annecy on Trinity Sunday, 6 June 1610. Jane had previously made over her wealth to her children, so the circumstances of the group were rather poor. The order accepted women who were rejected by other orders because of poor health or age. Their office was the Little Office of the Blessed Virgin Mary.

During its first eight years, the new order also was unusual in its public outreach, in contrast to most female religious who remained cloistered and adopted strict ascetic practices. A second convent was established in Lyon. The usual opposition to women in active ministry arose and de Sales was obliged to make it a cloistered community following the Rule of St. Augustine. He wrote his Treatise on the Love of God for them. When people criticized her for accepting women of poor health and old age, Jane famously said, "What do you want me to do? I like sick people myself; I'm on their side."

Her reputation for sanctity and sound management resulted in many visits by (and donations from) aristocratic women. The order had 13 houses by the time de Sales died, and 86 before Jane herself died at the Visitation Convent in Moulins, aged 69. Vincent de Paul served as her spiritual director after de Sales' death. Her favorite devotions involved the Sacred Heart of Jesus and the Sacred Heart of Mary. Chantal was buried in the Annecy convent next to de Sales. The order had 164 houses by 1767, when she was canonized. Jane outlived her son (who died fighting Huguenots and English on the Île de Ré during the century's religious wars) and two of her three daughters, but left extensive correspondence. Her granddaughter also became a famous writer, Marie de Rabutin-Chantal, marquise de Sévigné.

== Veneration ==
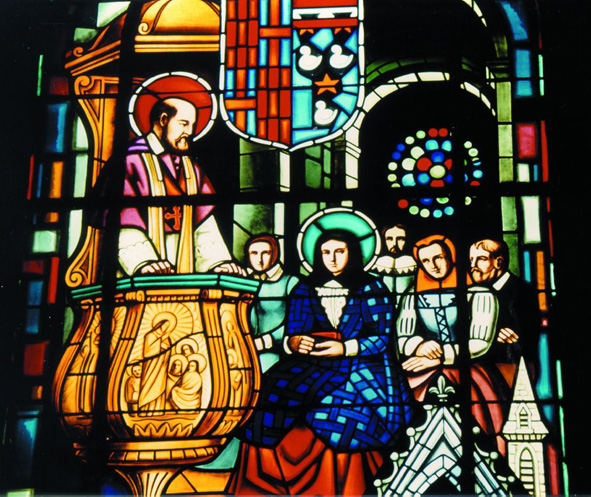
Francis de Sales meets Jane Frances de Chantal, cutout from a window in the cathedral of Annecy

She was beatified on 21 November 1751 by Pope Benedict XIV, and canonized on 16 July 1767 by Pope Clement XIII.

Saint Jane Frances's feast day was included in the General Roman Calendar in 1769, two years after she was canonized. Her feast was set as 21 August. In the 1969 revision of the calendar, her feast was moved to 12 December, to be closer to the day of her death, which occurred on 13 December 1641, the feast of Saint Lucy. In 2001, Pope John Paul II included in the General Roman Calendar the memorial of Our Lady of Guadalupe on 12 December. Consequently, he moved the memorial of Saint Jane Frances to 12 August.

In 2022, Jane Frances de Chantal was officially added to the Episcopal Church liturgical calendar with a feast day shared with Francis de Sales on 12 December.

Jane Frances de Chantal is invoked as the patron of forgotten people, widows, and parents who are separated from their children.

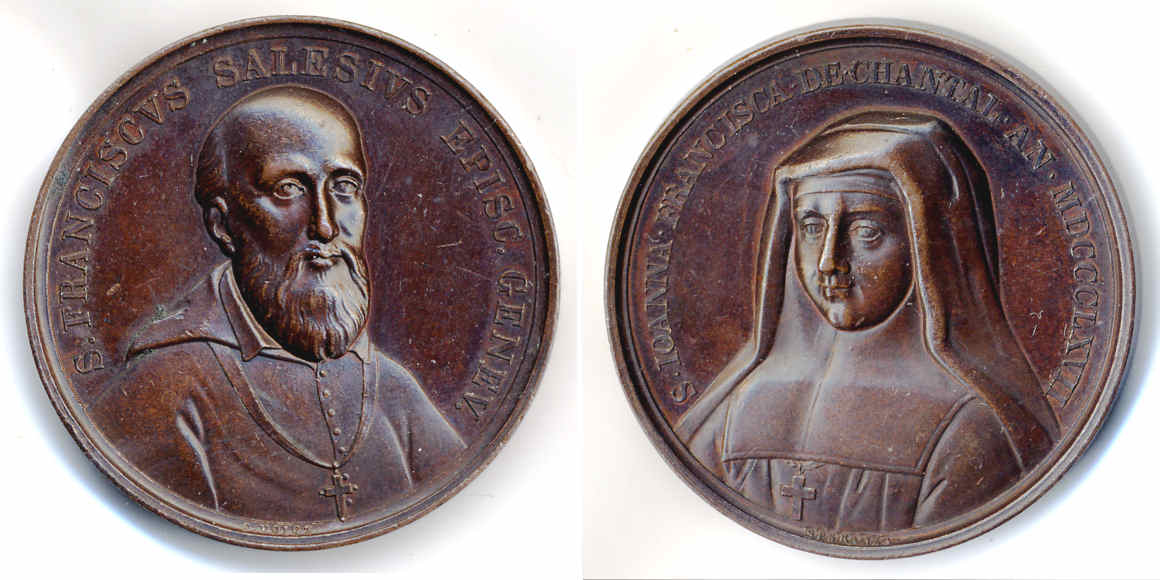
Francis de Sales and Jane Frances de Chantal, medal 1867

She also left a number of exemplary letters of spiritual direction.

== See also ==
- Saint Jane Frances de Chantal, patron saint archive

== Bibliography ==
- Saint Jeanne-Françoise de Chantal (1988). Francis de Sales, Jane de Chantal: Letters of Spiritual Direction. Paulist Press. ISBN 978-0-8091-2990-4.
- Brémond, Henri (1912). Sainte Chantal (1572-1641). Paris: J. Gabalda et Cie.. This book was placed on the Index Librorum Prohibitorum in 1913.
