= Childs, Maryland =

Unincorporated community in Maryland, United States

- Unincorporated community
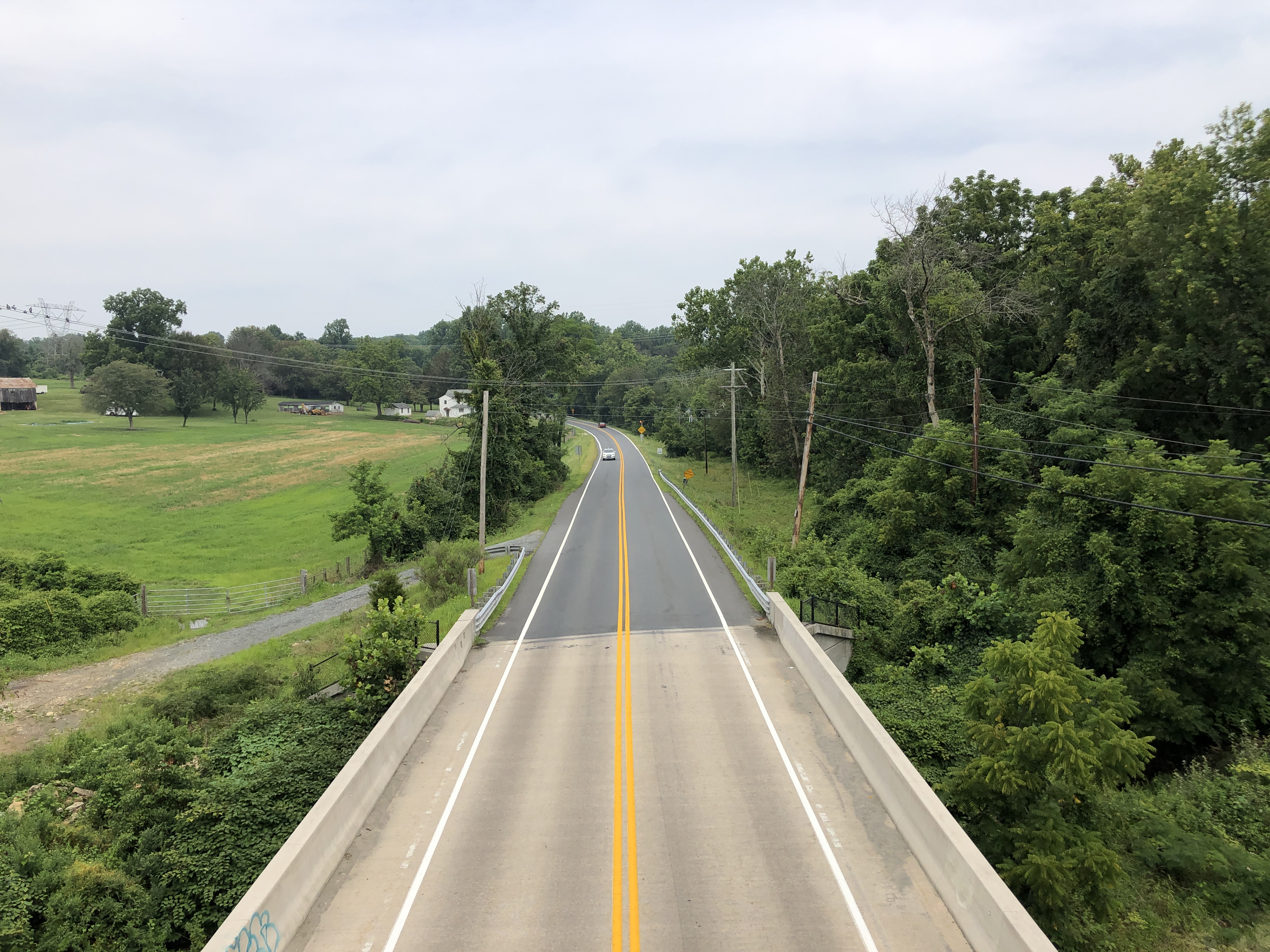
- Looking north along Maryland Route 545 in Childs

- Location within the State of Maryland Childs (the United States)
- Coordinates: 39°38′46″N 75°52′18″W
- Country: United States
- State: Maryland
- County: Cecil
- Elevation: 157 ft (48 m)
- Time zone: UTC-5 (Eastern (EST))
  - Summer (DST): UTC-4 (EDT)
- ZIP code: 21916
- Area codes: 410, 443, and 667
- GNIS feature ID: 589970

Childs is an unincorporated community in Cecil County Maryland, United States.

== Etymology ==
Childs was originally known as Spring Hill.

Childs is named after George W. Childs, an owner of the Philadelphia Public Ledger. In 1886, Childs purchased the Marley Paper Mills to support his newspaper operations.

== History ==
A train station called "Childs Station" opened in 1886 on the Baltimore & Ohio Railroad line. Until 1949, passenger trains stopped at Childs, but during ts last few years the station only handled freight, most of it going to and from the Elk Paper Company.

In 1893, the Lancaster, Cecil, & Southern Railroad opened a 4 1/2-mile spur from Childs to Providence, this road bringing freight rail service to a cluster of manufacturers on the Little Elk Creek. In May 1972, the B & O, which had acquired the line many years earlier, gave notice that it was completely abandoning the branch, which had seen declining service for decades as industries along the creek closed.

The Childs Post Office was established in 1887, and has been housed in at least three locations since that time. The ZIP code is 21916. The Post Office is currently located on Blue Ball Road, just north of the intersection of Childs and Blue Ball Road. At one time it was housed in the Old Childs Store, located at the northwest corner of what is now Childs, Star Route and Blue Ball Roads. The Old Childs Store is now an antique and art store. The third location was in a small one room building. In 1985, Childs was the location for the first issue of a six-cent tricycle stamp. A forgery of the first day of issue bearing a Childs postmark can be found on display at the Smithsonian.

The Cecil County Poorhouse was located just outside of Childs. The county purchased about 174 acres of land adjacent to the village from Henry Hollingsworth in 1788. Paupers – the elderly, sick, mentally ill, and people with nowhere else to turn – were cared for here until 1952. That year, the old county farm property was put up for sale. It was purchased by Elk Paper Manufacturing Company of Childs, the new owner donating part of the tract to the Oblate Sisters of Mt. Aviat Academy. The potter's field, the final resting place for paupers who couldn't afford a burial, is located across the road from Mt. Aviat Academy. It was used as the county cemetery until 1950, and there are from this period some 150 to 200 unmarked graves. There is a stone on the southern side of Childs Road that notes the location and dates of active use of the burial ground. The Potter's Field was also the site of a public execution in 1879.

== Culture ==
The Oblates of St. Francis de Sales have a facility in Childs which includes the Shrine of our Lady of the Highways, visible from Interstate 95. Early one foggy morning in October 1968 as seminarians, priests, and brothers were starting their early morning routine, they heard crash and crash on I-95. A swath of almost impenetrable fog had settled in this stretch of the John F. Kennedy Memorial Highway where it crosses the Little Elk Creek at Childs. As cars hit the dense fog, drivers slammed on the brakes, triggering a chain reaction as 20 vehicles quickly piled up. The first urgent call for emergency services came in at 6:20 a.m. from the Oblates. While they waited for fire and rescue services, seminarians and priests comforted the injured and dying. Three people died that morning before the sun came up. The young novitiates and seminarians were so moved by their experience as they waited for rescue units to make their way through the dense autumn fog that they erected a shrine in 1973, dedicating it to the memory of three people who died in the accident.

American songwriter Zoe Mulford released a 2006 CD, "Roadside Saints," which contains a track about the "stone lady," the shrine that encourages prayers for the safety of travelers.

== Geography ==
The Little Elk Creek winds through Childs, parallel to Maryland Route 545 (Blue Ball Road).

== Notable people ==
- Richard C. Brookings and Mary Carter, the parents of Robert Brookings, founder of the Brookings Institution, were from the Childs area.
- Confederate general William W. Mackall grew up in Childs at the Wilna estate, a home said to date to 1740. Richard Mackall, William W. Mackall's brother, was born at Wilna; he was a dentist and member of the Maryland General Assembly.
