= Plancy-l'Abbaye =

Commune in Grand Est, France

Plancy-l’Abbaye
- Commune
- Coat of arms
- Location of Plancy-l’Abbaye
- Location within France Location within Grand Est
- Coordinates: 48°34′15″N 3°58′09″E
- Country: France
- Region: Grand Est
- Department: Aube
- Arrondissement: Nogent-sur-Seine
- Canton: Creney-près-Troyes

Government
  - Mayor (2020–2026): Pascal Pluot
- Area^{1}: 41.38 km^{2} (15.98 sq mi)
- Elevation: 82 m (269 ft)
- Highest elevation: 132 m (433 ft)
- Lowest elevation: 76 m (249 ft)
- Population (2023): 960
  - Density: 23/km^{2} (60/sq mi)
- Time zone: UTC+01:00 (CET)
  - Summer (DST): UTC+02:00 (CEST)
- INSEE/Postal code: 10289 /10380
- ^{1} French Land Register data, which excludes lakes, ponds, glaciers > 1 km^{2} (0.386 sq mi or 247 acres) and river estuaries.

Plancy-l'Abbaye (French pronunciation: [plɑ̃si labei]) is a commune in the Aube department in north-central France.

== Population ==
Historical population
| Year | Pop. | ±% p.a. |
|---|---|---|
| 1968 | 922 | — |
| 1975 | 931 | +0.14% |
| 1982 | 964 | +0.50% |
| 1990 | 957 | −0.09% |
| 1999 | 849 | −1.32% |
| 2007 | 932 | +1.17% |
| 2012 | 947 | +0.32% |
| 2017 | 973 | +0.54% |
| 2023 | 960 | −0.22% |
Source: INSEE

== See also ==
- Communes of the Aube department
