= Linus Ngenomesho =

Namibian Catholic prelate (born 1969)

The Most Reverend Linus Ngenomesho
- Vicar Apostolic of Rundu, Namibia
- Church: Catholic Church
- Archdiocese: Roman Catholic Archdiocese of Windhoek
- See: Vicariate Apostolic of Rundu
- Appointed: 11 May 2026
- Installed: 18 July 2026
- Other post: Apostolic Administrator of Rundu (16 November 2020 – 11 May 2026)

Orders
- Ordination: 26 January 2002
- Consecration: 18 July 2026
- Rank: Bishop

Personal details
- Born: Linus Ngenomesho; 22 August 1969 (age 56) Omatando, Archdiocese of Windhoek, Oshana Region, Namibia
- Motto: Et dixit mihi: Sufficit tibi gratia mea (And he said to me: 'My grace is sufficient for thee, for my strength is made perfect in weakness')

Styles of Linus Ngenomesho
- Reference style: Your Lordship; The Most Reverend
- Spoken style: His Lordship
- Religious style: Bishop

Linus Ngenomesho O.M.I. (born 22 August 1969), is a Namibian Catholic prelate who was appointed Vicar Apostolic of the Vicariate Apostolic of Rundu, in Namibia on 11 May 2026. Before that, from 26 January 2002 until 11 May 2026, he served as a priest of the Missionary Oblates of Mary Immaculate, a Catholic religious order, of which he is a professed member. While a priest, he served as Apostolic Administrator of the Vicariate Apostolic of Rundu, Namibia, from 16 November 2020 until 11 May 2026. Pope Leo XIV appointed him bishop. His episcopal consecration took place in Mangarangandja, Namibia on 18 July 2026.

== Early life and education ==
He was born born on 22 August 1969 in Omatando, Archdiocese of Windhoek, Oshana Region, in extreme northern Namibia. He studied philosophy and theology at Saint Joseph's Oblates Scholasticate in Cedera, KwaZulu-Natal, South Africa.

== Priest ==
He was ordained a priest for the Missionary Oblates of Mary Immaculate, a Catholic religious order on 26 January 2002. He served as a priest until 11 May 2026. While a priest, he served in various roles and locations, including:

- Parish vicar in Gobabis, Archdiocese of Windhoek from 2002 until 2004.
- Assistant master of novices at the O.M.I. Formation House in Döbra, Namibia from 2002 until 2004.
- Provincial counsellor of the Oblates of Mary Immaculate of the Province of Namibia from 2003 until 2009.
- Director of the O.M.I. Formation House and parish priest of Saint Boniface parish in Windhoek from 2004 until 2008.
- Dean of the deanery of Windhoek from 2004 until 2008.
- Member of the College of Consultors of the Archdiocese of Windhoek from 2004 until 2020.
- Parish priest of Saint Peter Claver in Okahandja from 2009 until 2010.
- Provincial superior of the Oblates of Mary Immaculate of the Province of Namibia from 2010 until 2016.
- President of the O.M.I. Region for Africa and Madagascar from 2010 until 2016.
- Secretary general of the Namibian Catholic Bishops' Conference from 2016 until 2020.
- Apostolic administrator of the apostolic vicariate of Rundu from 2020 until 2026.

== Bishop ==
On 11 May 2026, Pope Leo XIV appointed Father Monsignor Linus Ngenomesho, O.M.I., as the new Apostolic Vicar of the Vicariate of Rundu in Namibia. He succeeded Bishop Joseph Shipandeni Shikongo, who last served as Vicar Apostolic of Rundu, Namibia from 14 March 1994 until his resignation on 16 November 2020.

Bishop Bishop Linus Ngenomesho, received his episcopal consecration at Mangarangandja, Vicariate Apostolic of Rundu, on 18 July 2026. The Principal Consecrator was Henryk Mieczysław Jagodziński, Titular Archbishop of Limosano and Apostolic Nuncio to Southern Africa. He was assisted by Liborius Ndumbukuti Nashenda, Archbishop of Windhoek and by Bishop Joseph Shipandeni Shikongo, Vicar Apostolic Emeritus of Rundu, Namibia and Titular Bishop of Capra.

== See also ==
- Catholic Church in Namibia

== Succession table ==
Catholic Church titles
| Preceded by Joseph Shipandeni Shikongo (14 March 1994 - 16 November 2020) | Vicar Apostolic of Rundu (since 11 May 2026) | Succeeded by (Incumbent) |
| Preceded by | Apostolic Administrator of Rundu (16 November 2020 – 11 May 2026) | Succeeded by |
