= Willem Christiaan =

Namibian Catholic prelate (born 1961)

The Most Reverend Willem Christiaans
- Bishop of Keetmanshoop, Namibia
- Church: Roman Catholic Church
- Archdiocese: Roman Catholic Archdiocese of Windhoek
- Diocese: Roman Catholic Diocese of Keetmanshoop
- Appointed: 7 February 2018
- Installed: 5 May 2018
- Predecessor: Philipp Pöllitzer
- Successor: Incumbent

Orders
- Ordination: 10 December 1988
- Consecration: 5 May 2018 by Protase Rugambwa

Personal details
- Born: 12 February 1961 (age 65) Gabis, ǁKaras Region, Diocese of Keetmanshoop, Namibia
- Denomination: Roman Catholic

Willem Christiaans O.S.F.S., (born 12 February 1961) is a Namibian Roman Catholic prelate. He is the Bishop of the Roman Catholic Diocese of Keetmanshoop, Namibia since 2018. He was appointed bishop on 7 February 2018 by Pope Francis. He served as Apostolic Administrator of the Keetmanshoop diocese while still a priest, from 26 July 2017 until 7 February 2018. He is a member of the Order of the Oblates of St. Francis de Sales. He was consecrated bishop on 5 May 2018.

== Early years and education ==
He was born on 12 February 1961 in Gabis, ǁKaras Region, Diocese of Keetmanshoop, Namibia. He made his first vows as an Oblate of St. Francis de Sales in 1983. In 1988 he made his perpetual vows as an Oblate. He studied philosophy at St. Joseph's Theological Institute in Cedara, KwaZulu-Natal, South Africa, graduating in 1984. He then completed his studies in Theology in 1988, at the same seminary.

== Priest ==
On 10 December 1988, he was ordained a priest of the Oblates of St. Francis de Sales. He served in that capacity until 7 February 2018.

As a priest, he held various positions inside and outside his diocese including as:

- Diocesan superior of the Order of Oblates of St. Francis de Sales for three consecutive terms since 1988.
- Vicar General of Keetmanshoop diocese from 2008 until 2013.
- Diocesan administrator of Keetmanshoop diocese from July 2017 until February 2018.

== Bishop ==
On 7 February 2018 Pope Francis appointed him Bishop of Keetmanshoop, Namibia. He was consecrated and installed at Keetmanshoop Stadium, in Keetmanshoop, Namibia on 5 May 2018. The Principal Consecrator was Archbishop Protase Rugambwa, Bishop Emeritus of Kigoma assisted by Archbishop Peter Bryan Wells, Titular Archbishop of Marcianopolis and Archbishop Liborius Ndumbukuti Nashenda, Archbishop of Windhoek.

== See also ==
- Catholic Church in Namibia

== Succession table ==
Catholic Church titles
Preceded by	Administrator of Keetmanshoop (26 July 2017 - 7 Feb 2018	Succeeded by
Preceded by Philipp Pöllitzer (31 May 2007 - 21 July 2017)	Bishop of Keetmanshoop (since 7 February 2018)	Succeeded by Incumbent
