= Oshikuku =

Town in Omusati Region, Namibia

- Town
- Nickname: tjaa-kwambi
- Motto: Together we can succeed
- Location in Namibia
- Coordinates: 17°38′00″S 15°28′00″E
- Country: Namibia
- Region: Omusati Region
- Constituency: Oshikuku Constituency
- Proclaimed town: 2011

Population (2023)
  - Total: 5,499
- Time zone: UTC+2 (SAST)
- Currency: Namibian dollar
- Languages: Oshiwambo, English, Afrikaans, German
- Religions: Protestant, Roman Catholic

Oshikuku is a town in Omusati Region in the north of Namibia. It is situated on the C46 from Oshakati to Ruacana about 30 km (19 mi) west of Oshakati. It is the district capital of Oshikuku Constituency. Oshikuku had a population of 5,499 people in 2023.

== History ==
After Iipumpu Ya Tshilongo, king of the Uukwambi from 1907 to 1932, had resisted the establishment of mission stations in his territory for years, he finally allowed the Catholic Church to establish the first mission station in former Ovamboland in Oshikuku in 1924. The station was established under the leadership of missionary and later Archbishop Joseph Gotthardt. Oshikuku is to this day home to a Roman Catholic Church parish.

Historical population
Year	Pop.	±% p.a.
2011	2,761	—
2023	5,499	+5.91%

== Economy and infrastructure ==
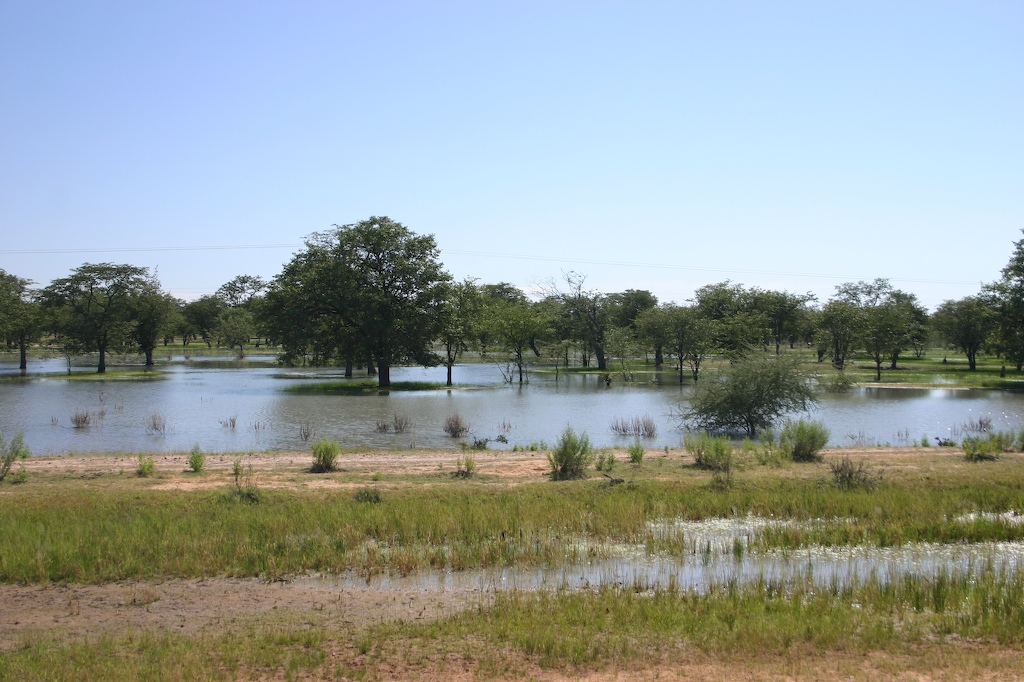
Efundja flooding near Oshikuku

Oshikuku hosts schools such as, Nuuyoma Senior Secondary School, Oshikuku Junior Secondary School, a sub police station, a hospital, a post office and two Grocery shops such as Shoprite Usave and OK. Its neighbouring town is Outapi, Elim and Ogongo.

Oshikuku Town hosts numerous informal traders and hawkers, who frequently sell at roadsides and public spaces (e.g. in front of the hospital). In 2014 the construction of a modern market facility was completed and the majority of street vendors moved to this new facility. After an initial completion of the construction in 2013, the potential tenants demanded several improvements before showing willingness to move in. The market features numerous open stalls and several rooms with access to electricity, water and sanitation. The market is expected to increase safety and hygiene of trade in Oshikuku.

Since 2007, Oshikuku has a government built and managed industrial park, accommodating various SMEs and larger businesses. The facility aims at increasing the town´s manufacturing potential by providing subsidised business amenities, preferably to local small and medium enterprises. Oshikuku Industrial Park was developed by the Offshore Development Company (ODC).

== Politics ==
Oshikuku was a village until early 2011, when it was granted town status. It is since then governed by a town council that has seven seats. Omusati Region, to which Oshikuku belongs, is a stronghold of Namibia's ruling SWAPO party.

In the 2015 local authority election SWAPO won by a landslide (497 votes) and gained all seven council seats. The Democratic Turnhalle Alliance (DTA) also ran but gained only 16 votes. SWAPO also won the 2020 local authority election. It obtained 472 votes and gained five seats. The Independent Patriots for Change (IPC), an opposition party formed in August 2020, obtained 157 votes and gained the remaining two seats.

== Notable people from Oshikuku ==
Oshikuku is the birthplace of Liborius Ndumbukuti Nashenda, Archbishop of Windhoek. Iipumbu Ya Tshilongo, eighteenth king of the Uukwambi, died here in 1959.
