= Namibian Catholic Bishops' Conference =

Assembly of Catholic bishops

The Namibian Catholic Bishops Conference (NCBC), established in 1996, is the episcopal conference of the Catholic Church in Namibia.

The NCBC is a member of the Inter-Regional Meeting of Bishops of Southern Africa (IMBISA) and Symposium of Episcopal Conferences of Africa and Madagascar (SECAM).

== Presidents ==
- 1996 – 2002: Bonifatius Haushiku, Archbishop of Windhoek
- 2007 – present: Liborius Ndumbukuti Nashenda, Archbishop of Windhoek
