= St. Stanislaus Cathedral (Keetmanshoop, Namibia) =

- St. Stanislaus Cathedral
- 26°34′38″S 18°07′50″E
- Location: Keetmanshoop
- Country: Namibia
- Denomination: Roman Catholic Church

Architecture
- Years built: 1954–1956

Administration
- Province: Windhoek
- Diocese: Keetmanshoop

The St. Stanislaus Cathedral is a Roman Catholic cathedral located in the city of Keetmanshoop, Namibia. It is the seat of the Roman Catholic Diocese of Keetmanshoop. The cathedral is dedicated to Stanislaus Kostka.

== History ==
After masses for the 116 Catholics in Keetmanshoop were held in a dwelling house around 1912, planning began in June 1913 to build a chapel . The chapel was benedicted on January 4, 1914 . Four days later the parish of Saint Stanislaus was founded. After the turmoil of the First World War, it was not until 1942 that the municipality resumed planning to build a cathedral. At the time, Keetmanshoop was the only diocese in Southern Africa with a bishop but no cathedral.

The foundation stone for today's church building was laid on May 13, 1954. The altar in the crypt was consecrated on June 17 of the same year. In February 1955 the statue of Our Lady of Fátima was placed in the church tower. Bishop Franz Esser consecrated the cathedral on June 20, 1956. Eight years later in May 1964 the cathedral received its altar cross, made by the Austrian artist Josef Furthner.

== See also ==
- Roman Catholicism in Namibia
