= Religion in Namibia =

Religion in Namibia (Pew Research Center 2020)
1. Christianity (90.5%)
2. Unaffiliated (5.60%)
3. Other religions (3.60%)
Religion in Namibia (2013 estimate)
1. Lutheran Church (43.7%)
2. Catholic Church (22.8%)
3. Anglican Church (17.0%)
4. Other Christian (4.40%)
5. Traditional faiths (10.1%)
6. No religion (1.50%)
7. Others (0.40%)

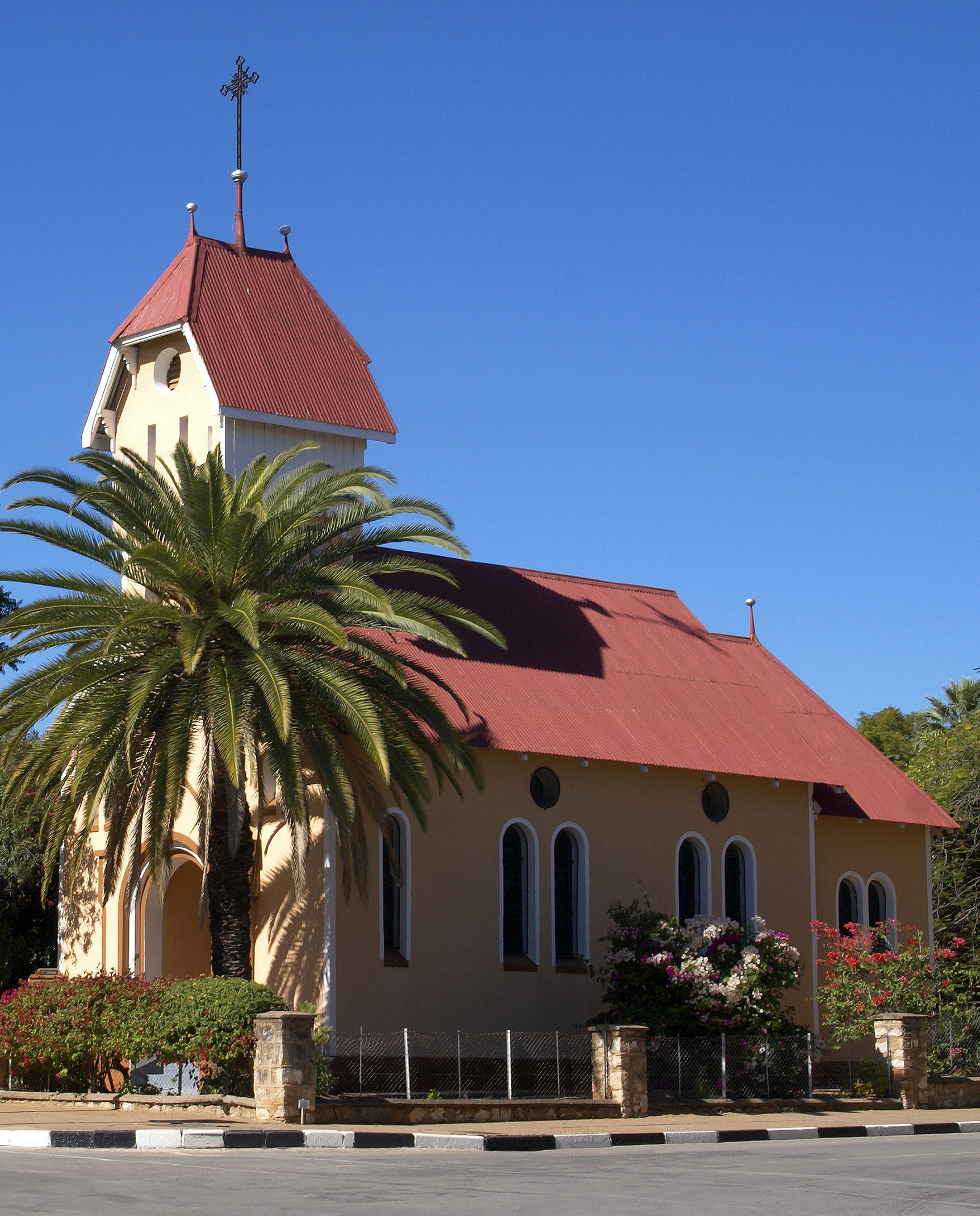
St. Barbara's Cathedral in Tsumeb.

Religion in Namibia is dominated by various branches of Christianity, with more than 90 percent of Namibian citizens identifying themselves as Christian. According to the government's survey, in 2013 up to two-thirds of the country was Protestant, including as much as 44% Lutheran.

According to the Namibia Demographic and Health Surveys (2013), the proportions in the age group between 15 and 49 years are:

- 65.1% Protestant (43.7% Lutheran, 4.4% Seventh-day Adventist, 17.0% Anglican or other Protestant denomination);
- 22.8% Roman Catholic;
- 10.5% a non-Christian religion (primarily African traditional religions, Sunni Islam, Buddhism);
- 1.5% unaffiliated or irreligious.

The Constitution provides for freedom of religion.

== Christianity ==
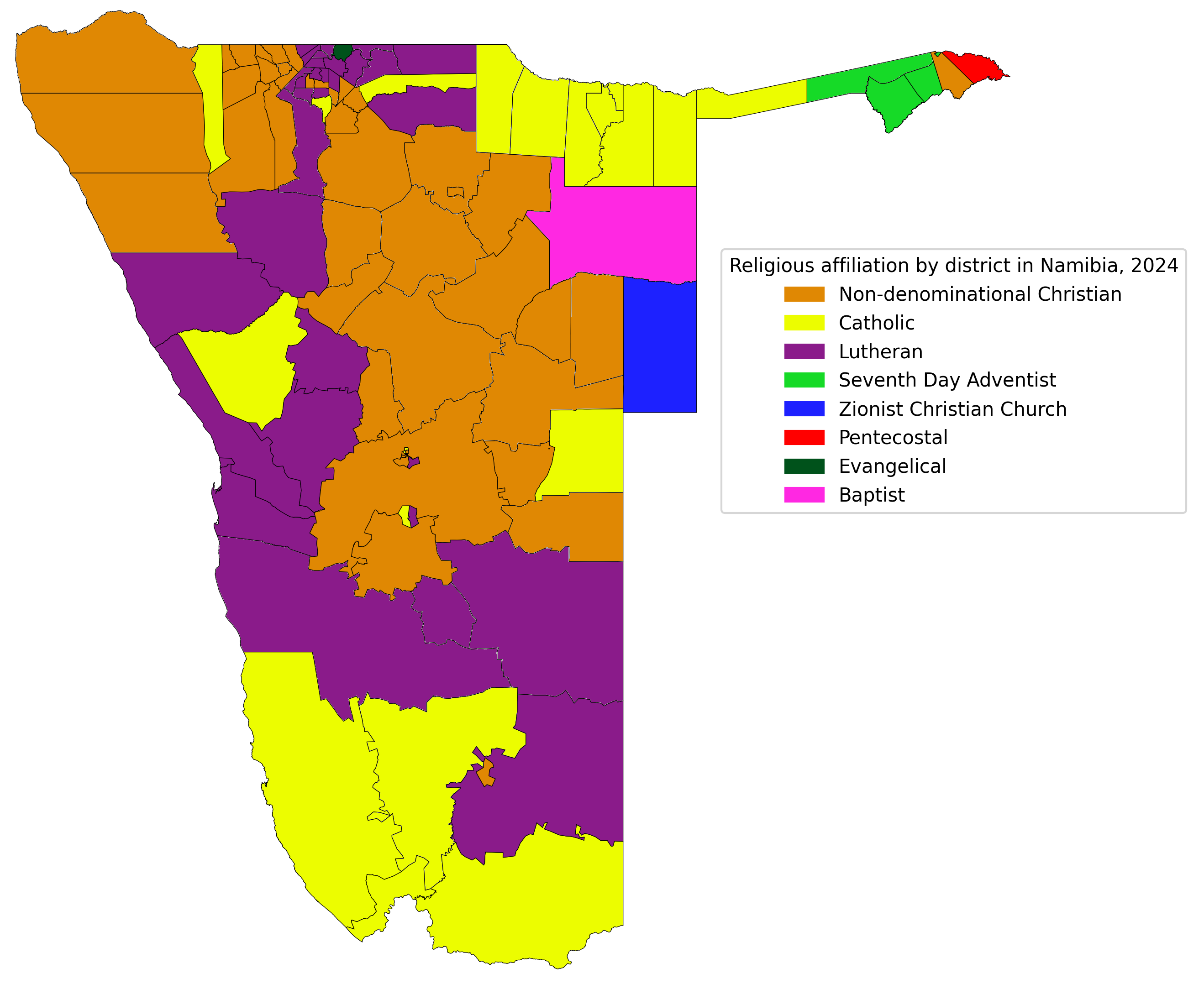
Largest Christian denomination by district in Namibia according to 2024 survey

=== Protestantism ===
==== Church in Namibia (Lutheran) ====
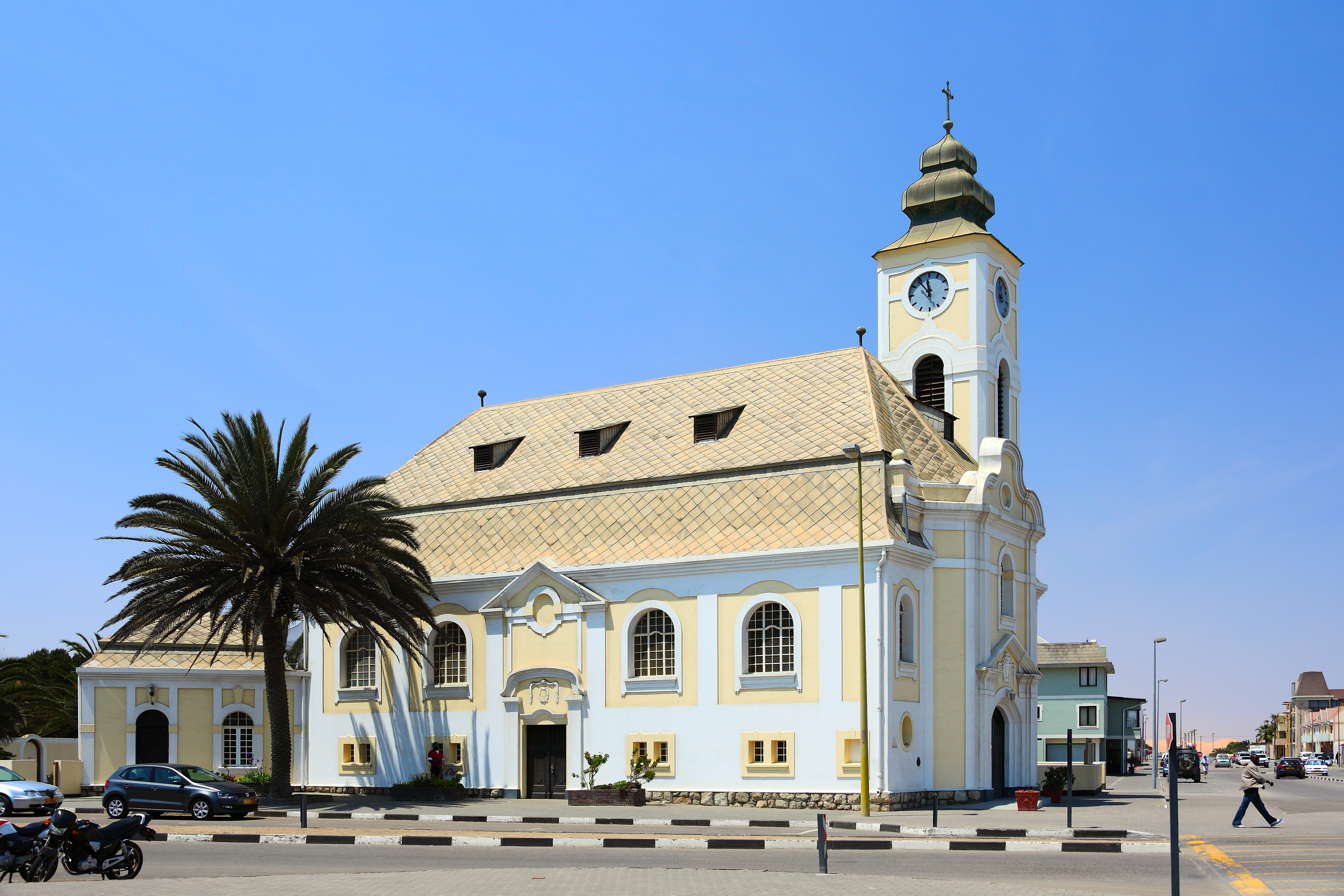
Lutheran church in Swakopmund. Owing to German and Finnish missionary efforts, Lutheranism is the religious affiliation of almost half of the Namibian population.

The largest Christian group in Namibia is the Lutheran church, which consists of 3 church denominations.

The Evangelical Lutheran Church in Namibia (ELCIN) grew out of the work of the Finnish Evangelical Lutheran Mission (earlier known as the Finnish Missionary Society) which began in 1870 among the Ovambo and Kavango people. It has episcopal polity and consists of two dioceses.

The Evangelical Lutheran Church in the Republic of Namibia (ELCRN) grew out of the work of the Rhenish Missionary Society from Germany which began working in the area in 1842. It operates the Evangelical Lutheran Church AIDS program, a business trust operating retreat centres, and a training centre for women which provides training for female leadership roles in society including nursery nurses.

The German-speaking Evangelical Lutheran Church in Namibia (ELCIN-GELC) is the smallest of the three churches (approximately 4,500 members). It has episcopal polity, with a single bishop as its leader.

In 2007 the three Lutheran denominations established the United Church Council of the Lutheran Churches in Namibia, with the ultimate aim of becoming one church. The two English-speaking denominations (ELCIN and ELCRN) train their clergy together at a single united seminary, and operate a number of common social programmes.

=== Catholicism ===
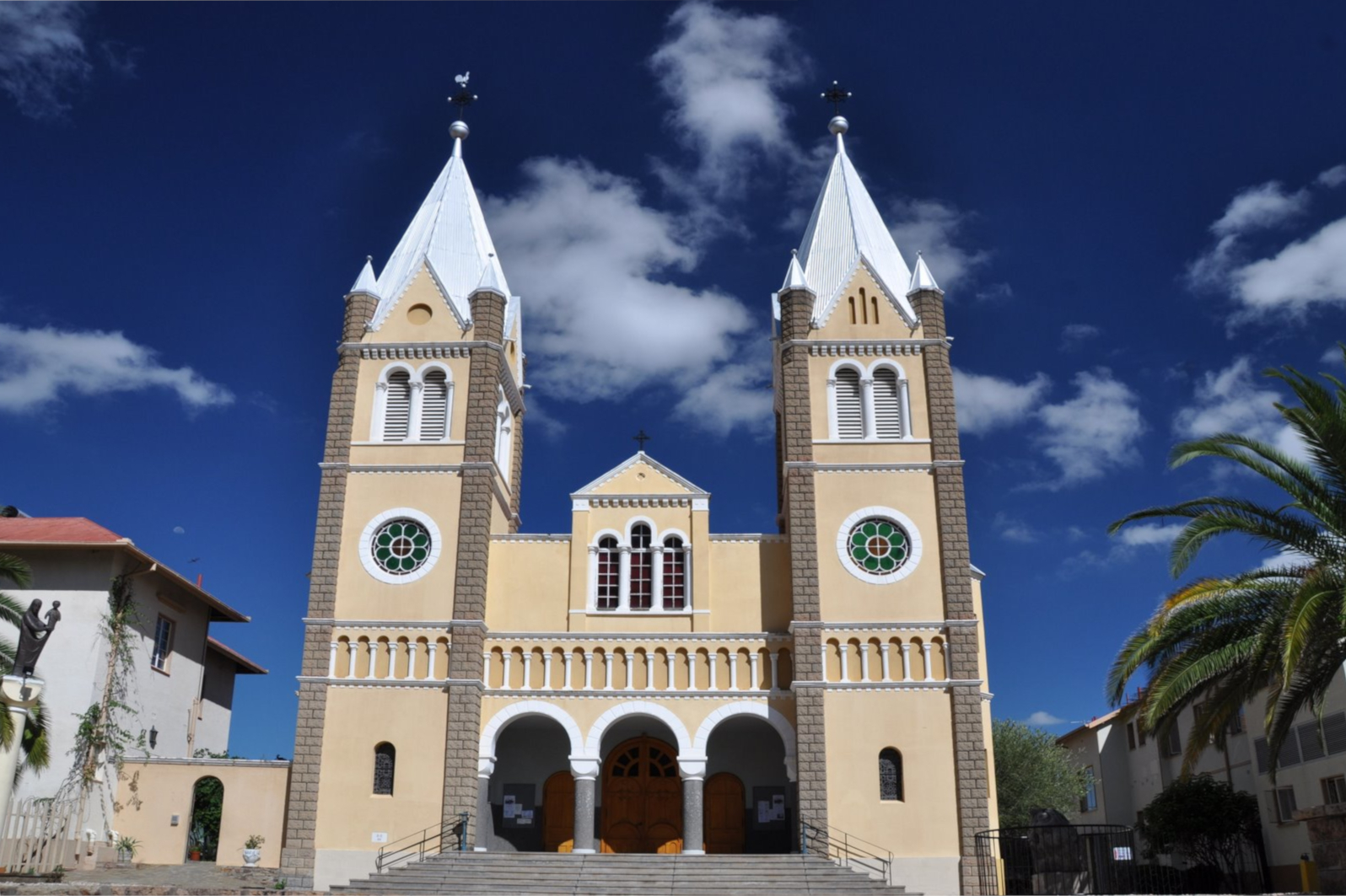
Catholic cathedral in Windhoek.

The second-largest Christian denomination is Roman Catholicism, and accounts for more than 20% of the population. It consists of three jurisdictions - the two dioceses of Windhoek and Keetmanshoop, and the Apostolic Vicariate of Rundu which is in the process of becoming a third diocese.

An apostolic prefecture was established as early as 1892, but the current metropolitan province and ecclesiastical structure was erected more recently, in 1994.

The Holy See maintains diplomatic relations with Namibia through a titular Apostolic Nunciature, but it is unstaffed, and in practice is vested in the Apostolic Nunciature to South Africa in Pretoria.

=== Other Christian denomination ===
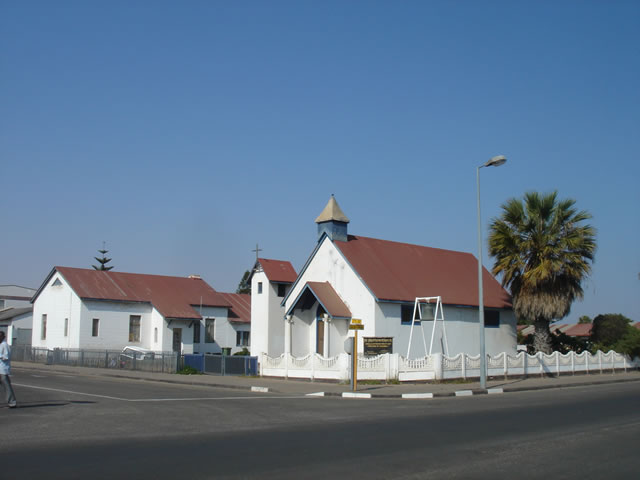
St Matthew's Anglican Church at Walvis Bay.

The Anglican Church consists of a single diocese (Anglican Diocese of Namibia), forming part of the Metropolitan province of Southern Africa. It is strongest in the north of the country. The Namibian Anglican church gave strong opposition to the imposition of apartheid policies during South African occupation, as a result of which a succession of Anglican diocesan bishops, suffragan bishops, and vicars-general were deported. The Anglican church worships principally in the English and Kwanyama languages.

Smaller numbers are affiliated with the Baptist Church, the Methodist Church, the Church of Jesus Christ of Latter-day Saints (Mormons), the Seventh-day Adventist Church, a number of Zionist Churches (practicing a mixture of traditional African beliefs), and Pentecostal Christianity.

== Minor religions ==
Practitioners of other religions are predominantly immigrants, descendants of immigrants, or recent converts. They reside primarily in urban areas.

Islam is practised by a minority, with Muslims in Namibia being mainly Sunni.

Other religions practised in the country include Judaism (with about 100 members), Buddhism, and the Baháʼí Faith.

Indigenous religions are practiced by the small Himba and San ethnic groups, which comprised less than 1% and 3% respectively of the population in 2007.

Atheists make up 0.02% of the country in 2020.

== Education ==
Government schools include classes on “religious and moral education” which includes moral principles and human rights.

== Clerical misconduct in Namibian churches ==
In the early 2000s it was reported that senior church officials and pastors in Namibia are involved in mismanagement of the churches' funds of millions of Namibian dollars. Many pastors were involved in scams and other serious criminal activities such as rape or handling of counterfeit currency of millions of U. S. dollars. The Namibian government is to investigate and combat such illegal practices so as to maintain the integrity, dignity, esteemed purpose, and high standards of such religious institutions in Namibia.

In 2022, Namibia police shut down what they called “fake churches” - this was based on allegations that they promoted civil unrest, engaged in unsafe practices, and committed fraud.

== See also ==
- Islam in Namibia
- History of the Jews in Namibia
