= Trocmades =

City in the Roman province of Galatia Secunda

Coordinates: 39°30′57″N 31°10′51″E

Trocmades or Trocmada was a city in the Roman province of Galatia Secunda. It appears to have been on the site of the modern Turkish village of Kaymaz, about twenty-four miles east of Eskişehir, Turkey.

== History ==
The city is known from ecclesiastical records; no geographer or historian mentions a city of this name. Hierocles' Synecdemus (698, 1) gives "regio Trocnades", instead of Ρηγετνοκνάδα; the 1913 Catholic Encyclopedia speculates that this usage refers to the Galatian name of some tribe on the left bank of the Sangarius.

Some writers have associated the name of Trocmades with the Galatian tribe of the Trocmi and even with the Biblical name of Togarmah, mentioned in Genesis 10:3, 1 Chronicles 1:6, and Ezekiel 27:14 and 38:6.

=== Ecclesiastical history ===
All the Notitiae episcopatuum up to the 13th century mention among the suffragans of Pessinus the see Τροκμάδων, meaning "of Trocmades" or "of Trocmada"; the two most recent (13th century) call it Λωτίνου; perhaps it should be Πλωτίνου, meaning "of (Saint) Plotinus", venerated there.

Le Quien, who gives the name of the see as Trocmada (neuter plural), mentions the following bishops:

- Cyriacus, who represented his metropolitan at the Second Council of Ephesus (449), and was represented by a priest at the Council of Chalcedon (451)
- Theodore, present at the Council of Constantinople (681)
- Leo, at the Second Council of Nicaea (787)
- Constantine at the Council of Constantinople (879-880).

Cyriacus, said to have assisted at the First Council of Nicaea (325), is not mentioned in the authentic lists of bishops present at that council.

The see of Trocmades is included in the Catholic Church's list of titular sees.
