= Ogongo =

Settlement in Omusati Region, Namibia

Coordinates: 17°40′S 15°17′E

Ogongo is a settlement in the Omusati Region, in the central North of Namibia. Its neighbouring places include Outapi, Elim and Oshikuku.

== Before independence ==
Up to the early 1990s life in Ogongo was determined by manual subsistence farming. There were no tarred roads and the village was not connected to the national electricity or water supply systems. Inhabitants of Ogongo collected water by foot from nearby dams and wells or from the neighbouring town of Oshakati. There were no shops except for shebeens (bars) at Ogongo village, people used to go to Oshakati to buy their goods and necessities, although it was not easy because transport to Oshakati was rare and expensive. There were hardly jobs available for the people, so people used to rely on their mahangu fields and livestock for maintenance and survival. There were no proper church buildings that time, so people gathered under a tree for their services. The same applies to schools and due to the lack of secondary schools in Ogongo learners used to go to schools in neighbouring towns after completing their grade seven. There was only one clinic at that time, situated far from the residents.

== After independence ==
When Namibia got its independence in 1990, the Namibian government had plans to rural areas, including Ogongo village. The government started building primary schools and the Ogongo combined secondary school. Plans were made to build a clinic to cater for the people in the settlement. The construction of a main road also took place. The development led to the Ogongo Library Project, which was supported by individuals like Rachel Manley, who was a teacher at Ogongo combined school.

There was a military base in this village, which was called Ogongo Base and was located just to the south of the tar road, approximately 50 kilometers west of Oshakati, on the Oshakati to Ruacana road. The base was situated next to the Ogongo Agricultural College in the village of Ogongo. It was a satellite base of 53 BN, Ondangwa in Sector 10. The map provided below shows the base as it looked during the 1980s.

== Ogongo Agricultural College ==
The Ogongo Agricultural College is part of the University of Namibia has led to job creation for the local population and attracts visitors from across the country as well as abroad. Apart from employment, the college, which is at the moment known as the University of Namibia Ogongo campus offers the inhabitants a variety of agricultural products such as milk, vegetables as well as meat. the campus in addition is a relive to poor parents and guardians who could not afford to send their children to far away towns such as Windhoek in order for them to get tertiary education, the campus is situated in the village and therefore cuts even costs for transport, accommodation and food as some student commute from home to school every day. Apart from that the campus is also of great help to its inhabitants on the fact that it offers its buildings to host various community functions such as award ceremonies of the local schools, weddings, or most commonly the entertainment events like Miss Ogongo and others. By doing this the institution promotes youth empowerment of the youth in the village.
