= Abrostola (Phrygia) =

Town of ancient Phrygia

Abrostola was a town of ancient Phrygia, inhabited during Roman times.

Its site is unlocated but is in the vicinity of Amorium and Pessinus.
