= Petinessus =

Town in Galatia Secunda

Petinessus (Pitnisus) was a town and bishopric in the late Roman province of Galatia Secunda.

== City ==
Petinessus is mentioned by Strabo; Ptolemy; Hierocles; and Stephanus Byzantius, s. v. According to the first of these authors it was situated in the salt desert, to the west of Lake Tatta, between Lycaonia and Haimama.

The exact name and position of the city, which differs greatly according to various documents, is not known. William Mitchell Ramsay mentions the place as near the site of Piri Begli or a little to the east of it.

== Bishops ==
The Notitiae episcopatuum mention it among the suffragan sees of Pessinus. It was created by Emperor Theodosius I between 386 and 395, and existed as late as the 13th century. There is a record of but one bishop, Pius, present at the Council of Chalcedon, 451.
