= Galatian =

Galatian may refer to:

- Galatians (people)
- Galatian language

== See also ==
- Galatia
- Galatia (Roman province)
- Galatians (disambiguation)
