= Liborius Ndumbukuti Nashenda =

Roman Catholic archbishop

The Most Reverend Liborius Ndumbukuti Nashenda O.M.I.
- Archbishop of Windhoek
- Church: Roman Catholic Church
- Archdiocese: Windhoek
- See: Windhoek
- Appointed: 21 September 2004
- Installed: 14 November 2004
- Predecessor: Bonifatius Haushiku
- Other posts: President of the Namibian Episcopal Conference (2007–); Vice-President of the Inter-Regional Meeting of Bishops of Southern Africa (2019–)
- Previous posts: Titular Bishop of Pertusa (1998–2004); Auxiliary Bishop of Windhoek (1998–2004)

Orders
- Ordination: 25 June 1988 by Bonifatius Haushiku
- Consecration: 7 February 1999 by Bonifatius Haushiku

Personal details
- Born: Liborius Nddumbukuti Nashenda; 4 April 1959 (age 66) Oshikuku, Omusati, Namibia

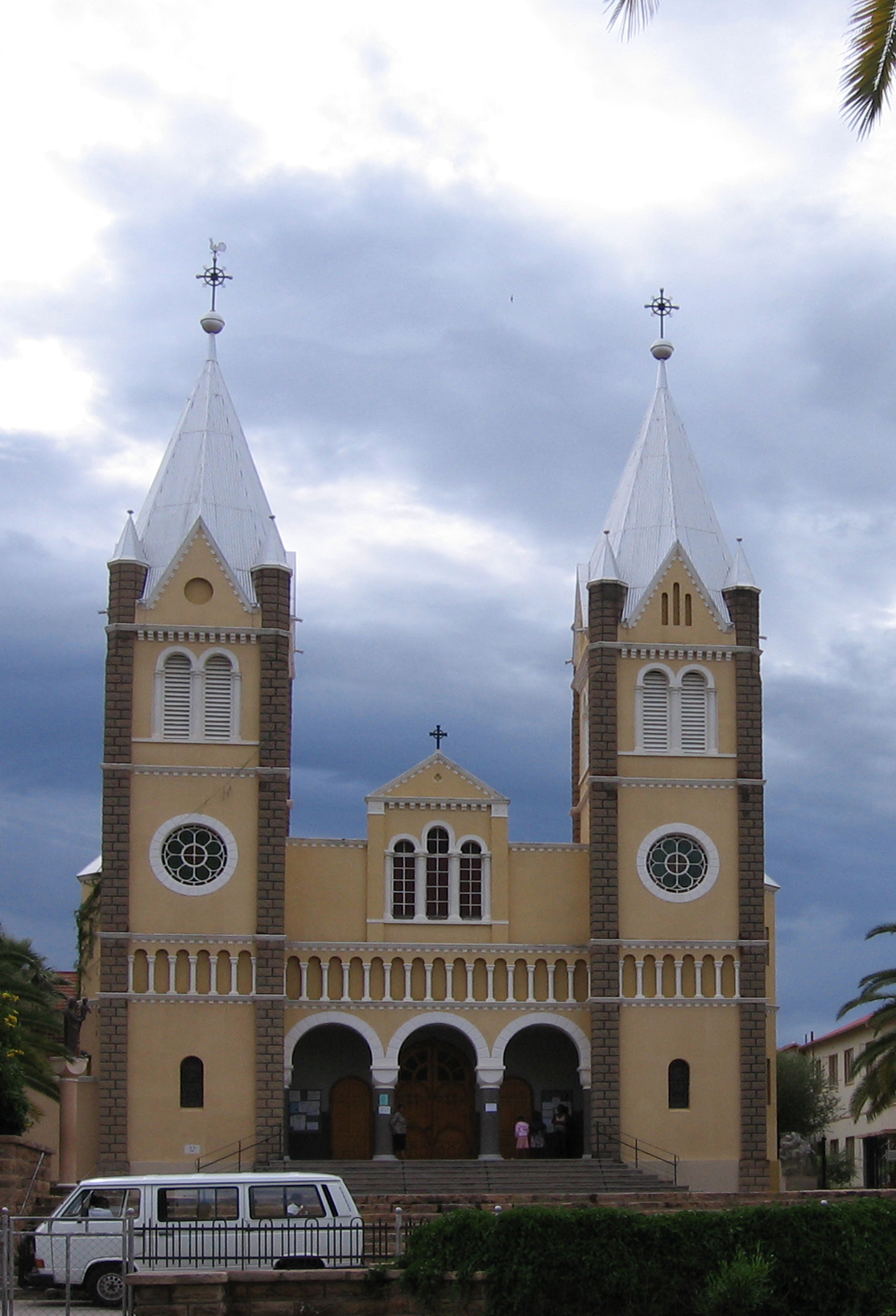
St. Mary's Cathedral, Windhoek where Nashenda was appointed in 2004.

Liborius Ndumbukuti Nashenda, O.M.I. (born 4 April 1959 in Oshikuku, Omusati Region) is a Namibian Roman Catholic archbishop.

He was ordained a priest on 25 June 1988. On 5 November 1998, he was appointed Auxiliary Bishop of Windhoek, and was ordained on 7 February 1999, as the Titular Bishop of Pertusa. On 14 November 2004, he became Archbishop of Windhoek, serving from St. Mary's Cathedral. On Heroes' Day 2014 he was conferred the Most Brilliant Order of the Sun, Second Class by President Hifikepunye Pohamba. In 2024 Ndumbukuti celebrated 25 years as Bishop. He is based at St Mary's Cathedral, Windhoek.

== See also ==
- Religion in Namibia
- Catholic Church in Namibia
- List of Catholic dioceses in Namibia
