= Iipumbu Ya Tshilongo =

Iipumbu ya Tshilongo (1875–1959) was the king of Uukwambi, an Ovambo clan in Namibia, from 1907 to 1932. He is one of the national heroes of Namibia.

== Biography ==
Iipumbu ya Tshilongo was born in 1873 in Onatshiku, a settlement near Elim, today in the Omusati Region of northern Namibia. An accident as an adolescent earned him the nickname Ndilimani (Oshiwambo: dynamite) when an explosion blew three fingers off his left hand.

He became the eighteenth king of the Uukwambi in 1907, succeeding King Negumbo lya Kandenge. During his reign he became known to jealously protect the tribal area of the Uukwambi from encroaching white settlers, going as far as having the roads guarded that led into Uukwambi territory.

Ya Tshilongo also resisted European cultural influence exercised via the establishment of mission stations and administrative outposts. Having rebuked the Finnish Missionary Society and the South West African Administration for years, he only allowed the Catholic Church to establish a station at Oshikuku in 1924. He ignored the Administration's request to send contract laborers, refused to pay taxes, and was generally uncooperative towards the authorities.

Oral history and archival records characterize ya Tshilongo as a despotic tyrant who ruled with an iron fist. He had many of his subjects flee his influence, including his daughter, Neekulu ya Shivute. Both his stubbornness towards the authorities and his questionable way of ruling led to a decision to topple him. In 1932, troops under Resident Commissioner Hahn attacked the Uukwambi during his absence and had his homestead at Onashiku bombed with military aircraft.

Iipumpu ya Tshilongo was later arrested and forced into exile in Kavango. He returned in 1938 to Amupolo due to illness. Ya Tshilongo died in Oshikuku on 9 September 1959.

== Recognition ==
Iipumbu ya Tshilongo is one of nine national heroes of Namibia who were identified at the inauguration of the country's Heroes' Acre near Windhoek. Founding president Sam Nujoma remarked in his inauguration speech on 26 August 2002 that:

Chief Iipumbu ya Tshilongo was a true Namibian nationalist ruler who rejected the idea to pay taxes to the South Africa colonial authorities and who refused to cooperate with them. He also did not allow the missionaries to gain any influence over him or his people. [...] His resistance and strong nationalistic character inspired many people, even in his absence, to continue with the anti-colonial struggle. [...] To his revolutionary spirit and his visionary memory we humbly offer our honor and respect.

Ya Tshilongo is honored in form of a granite tombstone with his name engraved and his portrait plastered onto the slab. His homestead in Onashiku was proclaimed a national monument in 2014. The site was deproclaimed a few months later.
