= Christianity in Namibia =

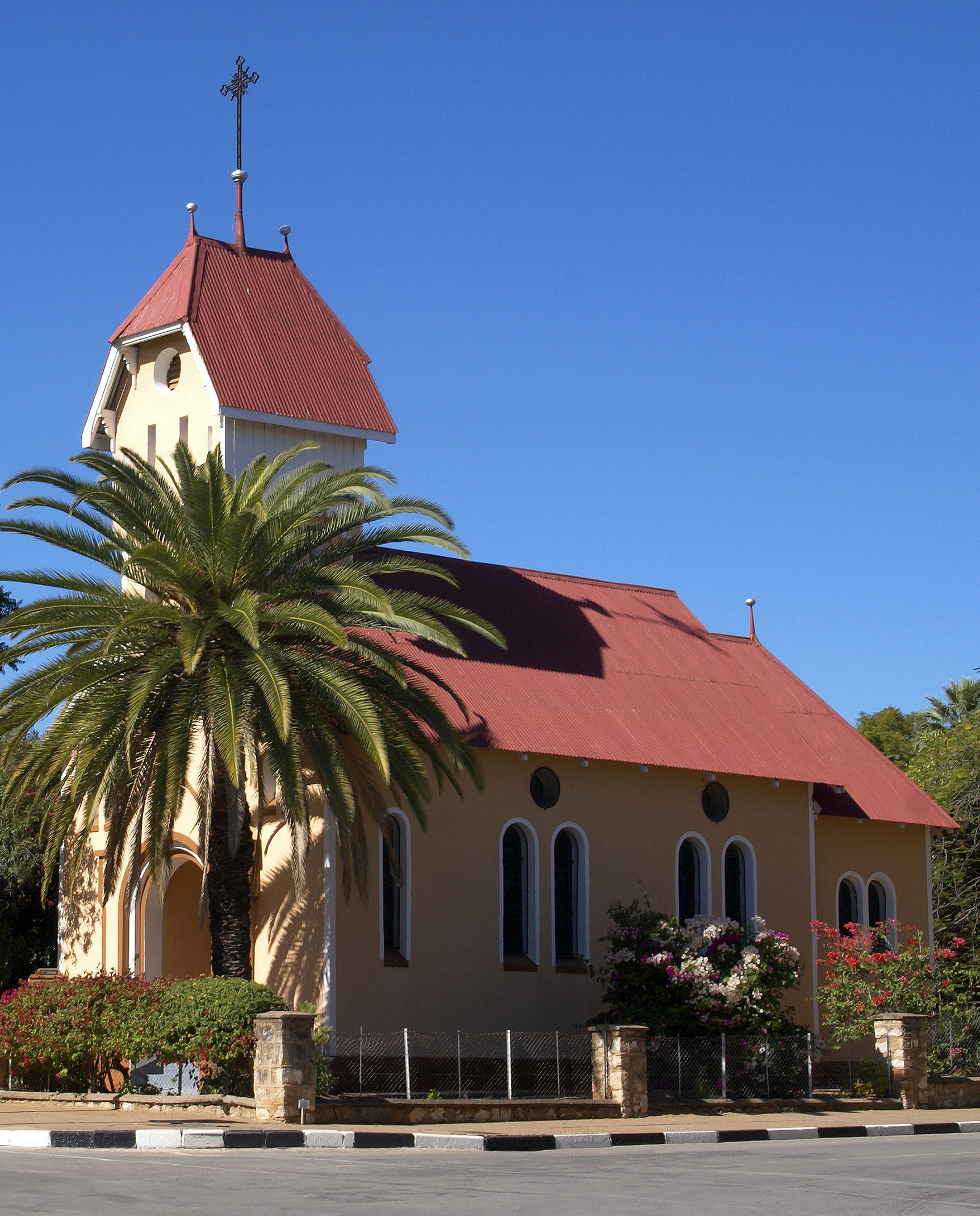
St. Barbara Church, Tsumeb, Namibia

Christianity in Namibia comprises more than 90 percent of the population. The largest Christian group is the Lutheran church, which is split into three churches: The Evangelical Lutheran Church in Namibia (ELCIN), which grew out of the work of the Finnish Evangelical Lutheran Mission (earlier known as the Finnish Missionary Society) which began in 1870 among the Ovambo and Kavango people; the Evangelical Lutheran Church in the Republic of Namibia (ELCRN), which grew out of the work of the Rhenish Missionary Society from Germany which began working in the area in 1842; and the German-speaking Evangelical Lutheran Church in Namibia (ELCIN-GELC). In 2007 the three churches established the United Church Council of the Lutheran Churches in Namibia in an attempt to merge and unify.

The second-largest Christian denomination is Roman Catholicism. Smaller numbers are affiliated with the Anglican Church, the Baptist Church, the Methodist Church, the Church of Jesus Christ of Latter-day Saints (Mormons), New Apostolic Church, Seventh-day Adventist Church, Branhamism, a number of Zionist Churches (a mixture of traditional African beliefs), and Pentecostal Christianity. The Dutch Reformed Church of Namibia is predominantly made up of members of the Afrikaner ethnic group.

== See also ==
- Religion in Namibia
- Roman Catholicism in Namibia
