= Carmine Rocco =

Italian priest and theologian

- Apostolic Nuncio to Brazil
- Church: Catholic Church
- In office: 22 May 1973 – 12 May 1982
- Predecessor: Umberto Mozzoni
- Successor: Carlo Furno
- Other post: Titular Archbishop of Justinianopolis in Galatia (1961-1982)
- Previous posts: Apostolic Nuncio to the Philippines (1967-1973); Apostolic Nuncio to Bolivia (1959-1967)

Orders
- Ordination: 26 July 1936
- Consecration: 12 November 1961 by Amleto Giovanni Cicognani

Personal details
- Born: 12 April 1912 Camigliano, Province of Caserta, Kingdom of Italy
- Died: 12 May 1982 (aged 70) Rome, Italy

Carmine Rocco (12 April 1912 – 12 May 1982) was an Italian prelate of the Catholic Church who devoted his entire career to the diplomatic service of the Holy See. He became an archbishop in 1961 and served as an Apostolic Nuncio from 1959 until his death.

== Biography ==
Carmine Rocco was born on 12 April 1912 in Camigliano, Italy, the last of seven children. He entered the local seminary at the age of twelve and studied at the Jesuit's Campano di Posillipo seminary from 1930 to 1936. He was ordained a priest of the Diocese of Teano-Calvi on 26 July 1936.

To prepare for a diplomatic career he entered the Pontifical Ecclesiastical Academy in 1937. From 1939 to 1946 he was assigned to the nunciature in France, which was headed by Angelo Roncalli, the future Pope John XXIII, as of 24 December 1944. He worked in Argentina from 1946 to 1949, in Rome at the Secretariat of State from 1953 to 1956, and in Brazil from 1956 to 1959.

On 19 January 1959, Pope John XXIII, who knew Rocco from their time together in France at the end of World War II, named him Apostolic Nuncio to Bolivia. (Note: The Catholic Hierarchy website incorrectly dates Rocco's appointment as Nuncio to 5 October 1961, but his nomination to Bolivia occurred almost three years earlier. Rocco was also identified as Nuncio to Bolivia when the Military Ordinariate of Bolivia was erected on 19 March 1961.) On 5 October 1961, Pope John appointed him titular archbishop of Iustinianopolis in Galatia. He received his episcopal consecration on 12 November 1961 in Rome's San Carlo al Corso from Cardinal Amleto Cicognani.

On 16 September 1967, Pope Paul VI named him Apostolic Nuncio to the Philippines.

On 23 May 1973, Pope Paul VI appointed him Apostolic Nuncio to Brazil.

He returned to Rome for medical treatment and died at the Agostino Gemelli University Policlinic on 12 May 1982.
