= Galatians =

Galatians may refer to:

- Galatians (people)
- Epistle to the Galatians, a book of the New Testament
- English translation of the Greek Galatai or Latin Galatae, Galli, or Gallograeci to refer to either the Galatians or the Gauls in general

== See also ==
- Galatia in Asia Minor
- Galatia (Roman province)
- Galatian (disambiguation)
