= St Boniface College =

Location
- Kavango East; Namibia
- Coordinates: 17.907°S 20.033°E

Information
- Denomination: Roman Catholic
- Established: 1995
- Principal: Mary Phillis Yesudasan
- Enrolment: 306

St Boniface College is a private secondary school in the Kavango East Region of Namibia, situated 30 kilometres (19 miles) east of the regional capital, Rundu. It is a Roman Catholic Church boarding school.

St Boniface was founded in 1995 and named in honour of Bonifatius Hausiku, the first Namibian Catholic bishop in Namibia; he later became an archbishop. St Boniface College is the top performing school in Namibia.

As of 2016, the school had 306 students from grades eight to twelve.

== Academic success ==
In recent years, St Boniface has been the top-performing school in the country. St Boniface students have made up the majority of the ten best performing grade 12 students in the country: nine of the top ten in 2010, five in 2011, seven in 2012, and eight each in 2013, 2014, and 2018.

The success of the school is attributed to its principal, Mary Phillis Yesudasan, who has been described as "very strict, combined with a military leadership style." She emphasises commitment from both teachers and students. Teachers at St Boniface regularly work until 10:30pm. Long hair and romantic relationships are banned among students, and mobile phones are forbidden for students and teachers alike.

All the teachers in the school are from other countries, such as Kenya, Zimbabwe or India: according to Yesudasan, "no Namibian teacher has proven competent enough to comply with the stringent expectations she fosters."

In order to maintain high academic standards, students who fail a grade are not allowed back to the school.

Not all alumni of St Boniface College have had success at university, and the school has been criticised for not preparing students for the self-study necessary at tertiary level.

== See also ==
- Education in Namibia
- List of schools in Namibia
- Roman Catholicism in Namibia
