= List of Catholic dioceses in Namibia =

The Catholic Church in Namibia, southwest Africa, is solely composed of a Latin hierarchy, united in the national Episcopal Conference of Namibia, comprising one ecclesiastical province, consisting of the Metropolitan Archdiocese and two suffragan sees: a bishopric and, exceptionally, a pre-diocesan, yet non-exempt Apostolic vicariate.

There are no Eastern Catholic or other exempt jurisdictions.

There are no titular sees. All defunct jurisdictions have current successor sees.

There formally is an Apostolic Nunciature to Namibia as papal diplomatic representation (embassy-level), but it is vested in the Apostolic Nunciature to South Africa in its capital Pretoria.

== Current Latin dioceses ==
=== Ecclesiastical Province of Windhoek ===
- Metropolitan Archdiocese of Windhoek
  - Diocese of Keetmanshoop
  - Apostolic Vicariate of Rundu
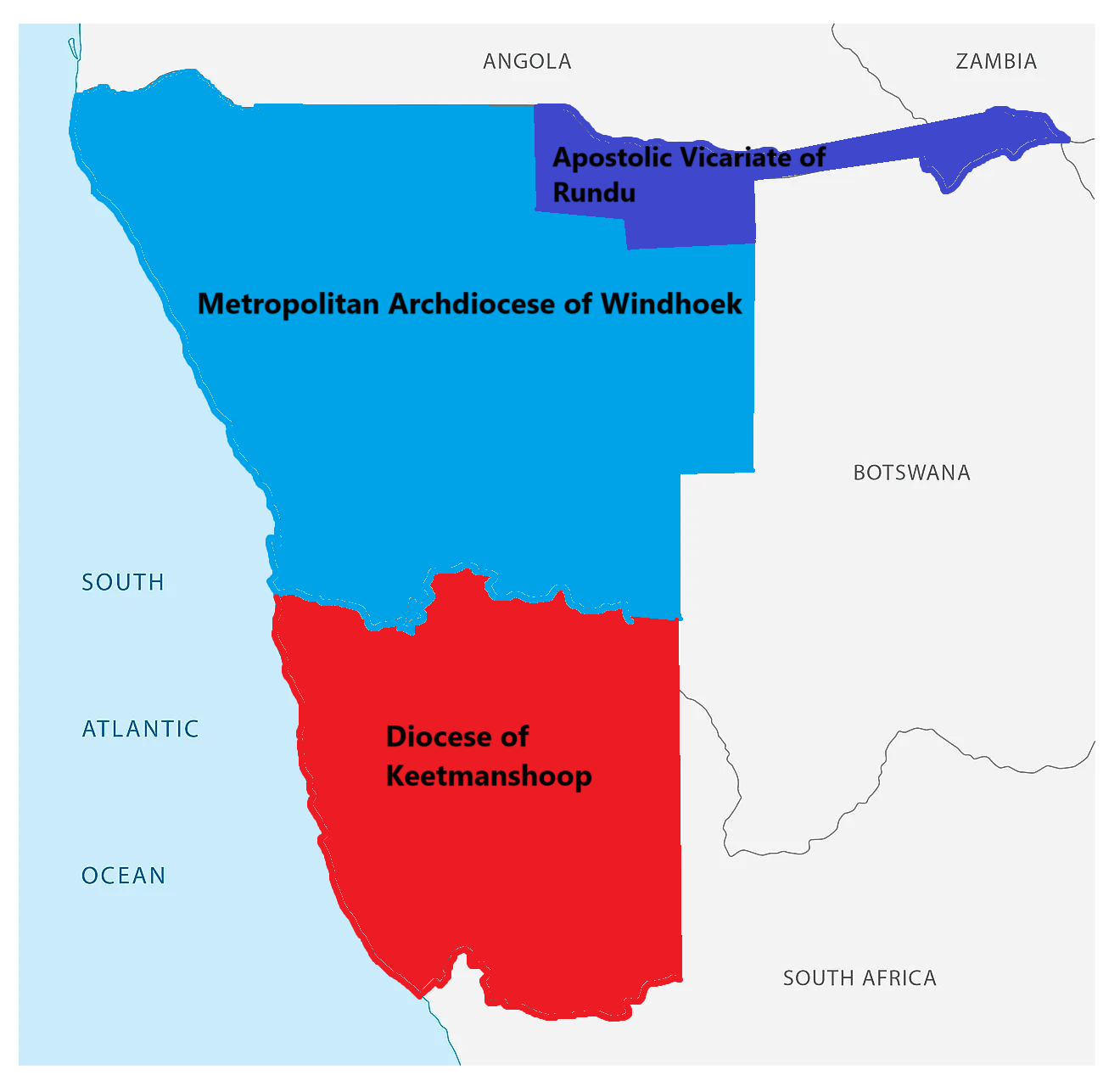
Map of each diocese's provenance in Namibia

== See also ==
- List of Catholic dioceses (structured view)
- Catholic Church in Namibia

== Sources and external links ==
- GCatholic.org - data for all sections.
- Catholic-Hierarchy entry.
