= Bonifatius Haushiku =

Namibian Roman Catholic archbishop (1933–2002)

Bonifatius Haushiku S.C.P.
- Archbishop of Windhoek
- Church: Catholic Church
- Archdiocese: Archdiocese of Windhoek
- In office: 29 November 1980 – 12 June 2002
- Predecessor: Rudolf Koppmann
- Successor: Liborius Ndumbukuti Nashenda
- Previous posts: Titular Bishop of Troyna (1978-1994); Auxiliary Bishop of Windhoek (1978-1980)

Orders
- Ordination: 29 June 1966
- Consecration: 27 January 1979 by Rudolf Koppmann

Personal details
- Born: 25 May 1933 Shambyu, mandatory South West Africa, British Empire
- Died: 12 June 2002 (aged 69)

Bonifatius Haushiku or Hausiku (25 May 1933 – 12 June 2002) was a Namibian Roman Catholic religious leader.

== Early years ==
Haushiku was born in Shambyu on 25 May 1933. He attended St. Josef's Teacher Training College in Döbra and St. Teresa's Minor Seminary and St. Augustine's Major Seminary in Roma, Lesotho.

== Career ==
In June 1966, Haushiku was ordained at a priest. On 27 January 1979, Haushiku was ordained a bishop, becoming the first indigenous Roman Catholic bishop in Namibia. He was made titular bishop of Troyna and auxiliary bishop of Windhoek. In November 1980, Haushiku was appointed Vicar Apostolic of Windhoek.

In 1986 Haushiku, along with the Lutheran bishop Kleopas Dumeni and the Anglican bishop James Kauluma, challenged a dusk-to-dawn curfew that South African authorities had imposed in Namibia. The bishops argued that the curfew violated the freedom to assemble, freedom of religion, freedom of association, and freedom of movement. Later that year he was part of a delegation that travelled to Washington DC to "appeal for pressure on the government of South Africa to end its long time occupation of their country."

On 22 May 1995 Haushiku was installed as archbishop of the newly created Archdiocese of Windhoek.

In 2000, as President of the Council of Churches in Namibia, he led a 2000-person protest march in which he spoke against unemployment, poverty, disease, gender-based violence, and murder.

After suffering from cancer for more than a year, Haushiku died on 12 June 2002.

== Recognition ==
St Boniface College, a boarding school in Kavango East founded in 1995, is named after him.
