= Myrika =

City and bishopric in Galatia Salutaris

Coordinates: 39°28′31″N 32°30′30″E

Myrica or Myrika, also called Myrikion (Ancient Greek: Μυρικιών) and Therma, was a city and bishopric in Galatia Salutaris (in Asia Minor), known for its hot springs.

== Description ==
Because of the mention of the hot springs in the signature of the bishop at the Council of Chalcedon, William Mitchell Ramsay identified this city with the town known in his time (19th century) as Saint Agapetos (in Greek Ἅγιος Ἀγαπητός). He interpreted as a change of name, not of location, the contrast between earlier sources such as this, which speak of a bishopric of Myrika (Myrica), and the references to a see of Saint Agapetos in later Notitiae Episcopatuum and in the signature of a bishop at the Quinisext Council of 692.

However, Ramsay also mentioned the existence within Galatia Salutaris of other hot springs at "the Merkez of the Haimane", and some identify with "the ancient Myrica Therma" the volcanically heated baths of Haymana, Ankara, which are reputed to have healing properties, especially for arthritis, rheumatism and gynaecological disorders.

The identification of the episcopal see of Myrica given in the Annuario Pontificio is "Merkez".

Modern scholars place its site near Yeşilyurt, Asiatic Turkey.
