= Pessinus =

Ancient name for the modern Turkish village of Ballıhisar

- Πεσσινούς (Greek)
- Location within Turkey
- 39.331448°N 31.583280°E
- Type: Settlement
- Periods: Hellenistic to Medieval
- Location: Ballıhisar, Eskişehir Province, Turkey
- Region: Phrygia

Site notes
- Condition: In ruins

Pessinus (Greek: Πεσσινούς or Πισσινούς) was an ancient city and archbishopric in Asia Minor, a geographical area roughly covering modern Anatolia (Asian Turkey). The site of the city is now the modern Turkish village of Ballıhisar, in a tributary valley of the Sakarya River on the high Anatolian plateau at ca. 950 m above sea level, 13 km from the small town of Sivrihisar. Pessinus remains a Catholic (formerly double) titular see.

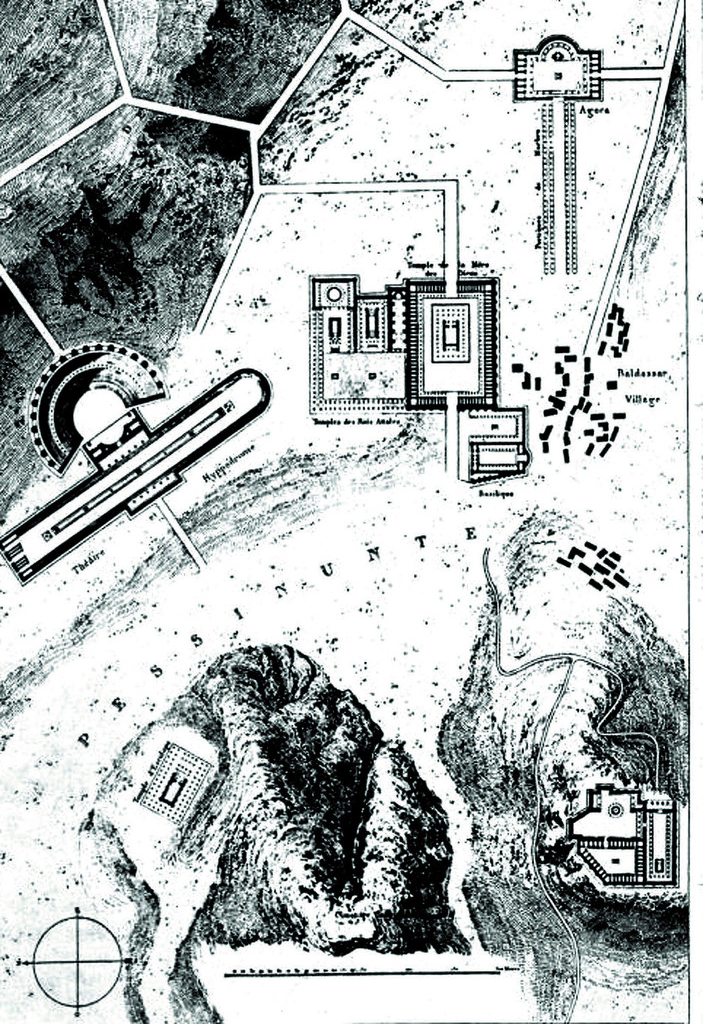
Hypothetic map of the ruins at Pessinus by the French explorer Charles Texier (1834).

== Description ==
=== The temple area ===
As yet, the temple area, which was excavated between 1967 and 1972, is the only well-studied area of Pessinus. It was studied thoroughly by M. Waelkens (current director of Sagalassos excavations) in the 1980s and between 2006 and 2012 by Verlinde (Ghent University), who built on the findings of the former to analyze and reconstruct the architecture of the Corinthian peripteral temple, of which only the massive foundations remain. Investigations led to several observations, such as the Tiberian date (25-35 AD) of the cult building and its identification as a temple of the imperial cult (Sebasteion). As such, it was finally established that the excavated temple could not be identified as the Temple of Cybele, as explorer Charles Texier had done when he 'discovered' the foundations of the temple in 1834. Verlinde discovered that the building was designed on the basis of a grid, and that the governing module, determining the intervals and height of the columns, was equal to the lower diameter of the columns (0.76 m). Each intercolumnar space was equal to two modules (1.52 m), which designates the temple as a 'systyle.'

Furthermore, the extraordinarily large stepped podium seems to have been influenced by Hellenistic and early Imperial pseudodipteroi. Although the temple was Tiberian, the decorative sculpture was fashioned in a conservative Augustan manner, which suggests that the building may have been design in the late Augustan period (ca. 15 AD). The temple towered over the back of a theatre, which combined a central staircase with two cavea wings for spectators. It was claimed by Verlinde that this theatrical area was ritual and used for gladiatorial fights, as the theatre contained raised seats with a protective parapet, which was typical for gladiatorial theatres in the Greek east. Given that such gladiatorial combat was as a rule intertwined with the imperial cult, Verlinde argued that the epigraphically attested cult of the emperor, was once again confirmed. He also observed that there is a consistency of such theatre-temples, which were influenced by late Republican sanctuaries in Italy (e.g. the sanctuary of Hercules Victor at Tivoli), being associated with the imperial cult. The sanctuary of Augustus at Stratonicea, which was a theatre-temple as well, may have served as a model for the sanctuary in Pessinus.

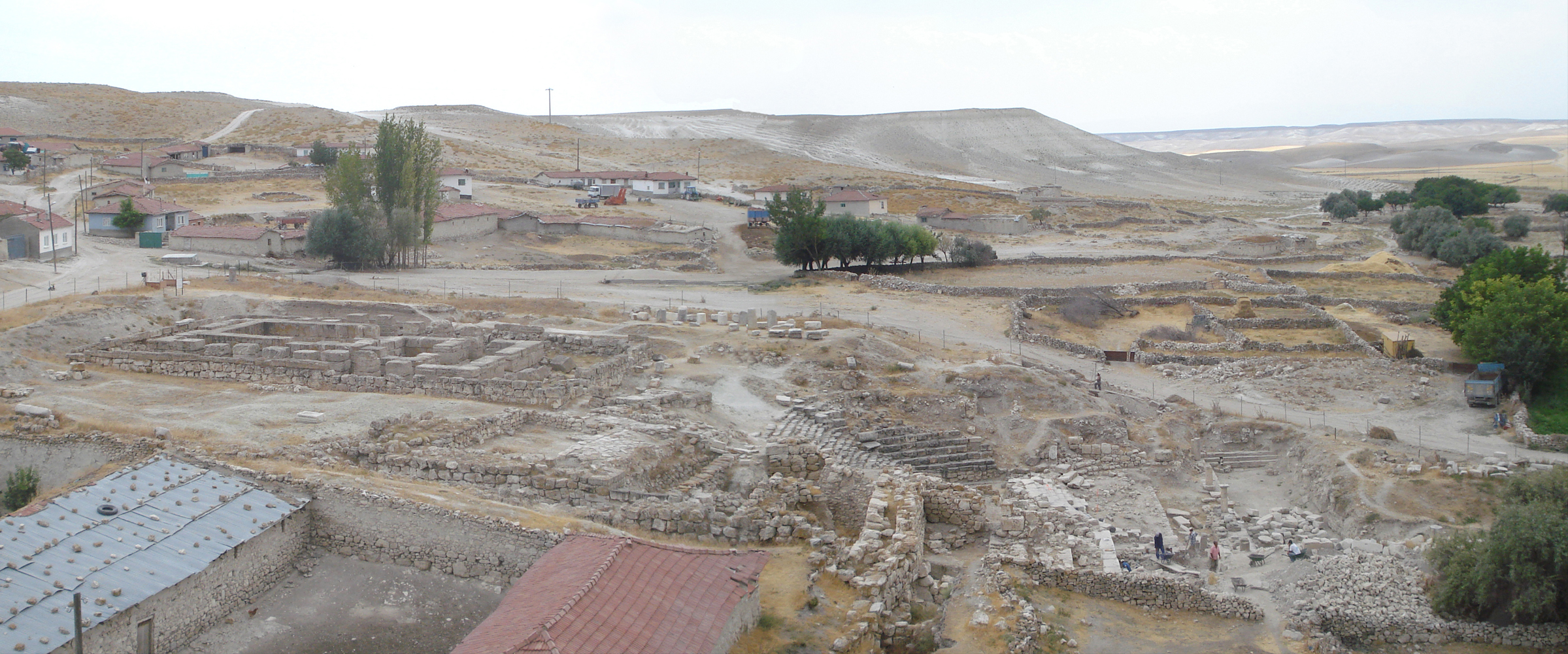
View of the temple area from the mosque at Ballıhisar (photograph and panoramic montage by A. Verlinde).

=== The colonnaded square ===
The colonnaded square in front of the stairway-theatre was thought to have been part of the imperial complex. However, this was rejected by Verlinde who dated the complex to the late 2nd century BC. The architecture of the limestone complex (covered with stucco lustro) emanates the style of Hellenistic palaestrae such as the Gymnasion of Eudemos at Miletus (late 3rd century BC). Being quite similar to the latter complex, the Pessinuntian square was reconstructed by Verlinde as a 'quadriporticus' with a Rhodian peristyle, that is with a high (Ionic) colonnade to the north, and three lower wings with Doric columns. The quadriporticus was an annex of the Hellenistic citadel on the promontory to the east, which preceded the early imperial temple.

Eastern stoa of the colonnaded square or quadriporticus at Pessinus (Photograph by A. Verlinde).

The combination of a Hellenistic palace and a gymnasium (school) was a typical phenomenon of the Greek world during the Hellenistic age. Carbon dating and ceramological analysis indicates that the palaestra (sports gym) was destroyed by a fire during the late Hellenistic age, suggesting that the colonnaded square as a functional entity was short-lived. After the quadriporticus was destroyed, it was not rebuilt during the early Roman period, as the area may have been used as an unpaved arena for the gladiatorial fights of the temple. In the 3rd century AD, the area was monumentalized with a new ellipse-shaped theatre and a vast marble square with a monumental funerary crypt (a funerary Heroon). This coincided with the further monumentalization of the cardo maximus, which received monumental city gates in the form of arches at its southern and northern extremity.

== History ==
=== Origins ===
The mythological King Midas (738-696 BC?) is said to have ruled a greater Phrygian realm from Pessinus, but archaeological research since 1967 showed that the city developed around 400 BC at the earliest, which contradicts any historical claim of early Phrygian roots.

According to ancient tradition, Pessinus was the principal cult centre of the goddess Cybele, the Phrygian Meter ("Mother"). Tradition situates the cult of Cybele in the early Phrygian period (8th century BC) and associates the erection of her first "costly" temple and even the founding of the city with king Midas (738-696 BC?). However, the Phrygian past of Pessinus is still obscure, both historically as archaeologically. For example, the geographer Strabo (12.5.3) writes that the priests were potentates in "ancient times", but it is unclear whether Pessinus was already a temple state ruled by dynastai ("lords") in the Phrygian period.

=== Hellenistic period ===
By the 3rd century BC at the latest, Pessinus had become a temple state ruled by a clerical oligarchy consisting of Galloi, eunuch priests of the Mother Goddess. After the arrival of Celtic tribes in Asia Minor in 278/277 BC, and their defeat at the hand of Antiochus I during the so-called 'Battle of the Elephants' (likely 268 BC), the Celts settled in the north-central region of Anatolia which became known as Galatia. The tribe of the Tolistobogii occupied the Phrygian territory between Gordium and Pessinus. It is doubtful that the temple state actually stood under Galatian control at this early stage. According to Cicero (Har. Resp. 8.28) the Seleucid kings held deep devotion for the shrine.

Roman involvement in Pessinus however has early roots. In 205/204 BC, alarmed by a number of meteor showers during the ongoing Second Punic War, the Romans, after consulting the Sibylline Books, decided to introduce the cult of the Great Mother of Ida (Magna Mater Idaea, also known as Cybele) to the city. They sought the aid of their ally Attalus I (241-197 BC), and following his instructions, they went to Pessinus and removed the goddess' most important image, a large black stone that was said to have fallen from the sky, to Rome (Livy 10.4-11.18).

Pergamum seems to have gained some control over Pessinus by the end of the third century BC. Pessinus was bequeathed a sanctuary by the Attalid kings, perhaps after 183 BC, when Galatia was subject to Pergamene rule.

The first century BC was a very unstable period for Pessinus with many rulers reigning over central Anatolia. According to Strabo (12.5.3) the priests gradually lost their privileges. The Mithridatic Wars (89-85 BC; 83-81 BC; 73-63 BC) caused political and economic turmoil throughout the region. When Deiotaros, tetrarch of the Tolistobogii and loyal vassal of Rome, became king of Galatia in 67/66 BC or 63 BC, Pessinus lost its status as an independent sacred principality.

=== Imperial period ===
In 36 BC, rule over Galatia was transferred to king Amyntas by Mark Antony. At the death of the monarch, under Emperor Augustus the kingdom of the Galatians was annexed by the Roman Empire as the province of Galatia. Pessinus became the administrative capital of the Galatian tribe of the Tolistobogii and soon developed into a genuinely Graeco-Roman polis with a large number of monumental buildings, such as a colonnaded street and a Temple of the Imperial Cult.

The priest list on the left hand anta of the temple of Augustus and Roma in Ankara reveals that by the end of Tiberius' principate two citizens of Pessinus held the chief priesthood of the provincial imperial cult in Ancyra: M. Lollius in AD 31/32 and Q. Gallius Pulcher in AD 35/36. Strabo called Pessinus an 'emporion,' a trading centre, the largest west of the Halys river. It may be assumed that products from the Anatolian highlands were traded, especially grain and wool. A stamped handle of a wine amphora from Thasos, probably dating from the first quarter of the 3rd century BC, is proof of this trade and is at the same time the earliest written document discovered at Pessinus.

Very soon after 25 BC the urbanization and transformation of the Pessinuntian temple state into a Greek polis began. Constructions such as a Corinthian temple and a colonnaded street (cardo maximus) were erected with the marble from the quarries located at İstiklalbağı, ca. 6 km north of the city. The boundaries of Pessinus must have been fixed, as were those of the newly founded colony of Germakoloneia (near Babadat), which received part of the area inhabited by the Tolistobogioi. It has been argued that Pessinus and the other Galatian cities received a constitution based on that of the cities in Pontus-Bithynia, imposed by the lex Pompeia.

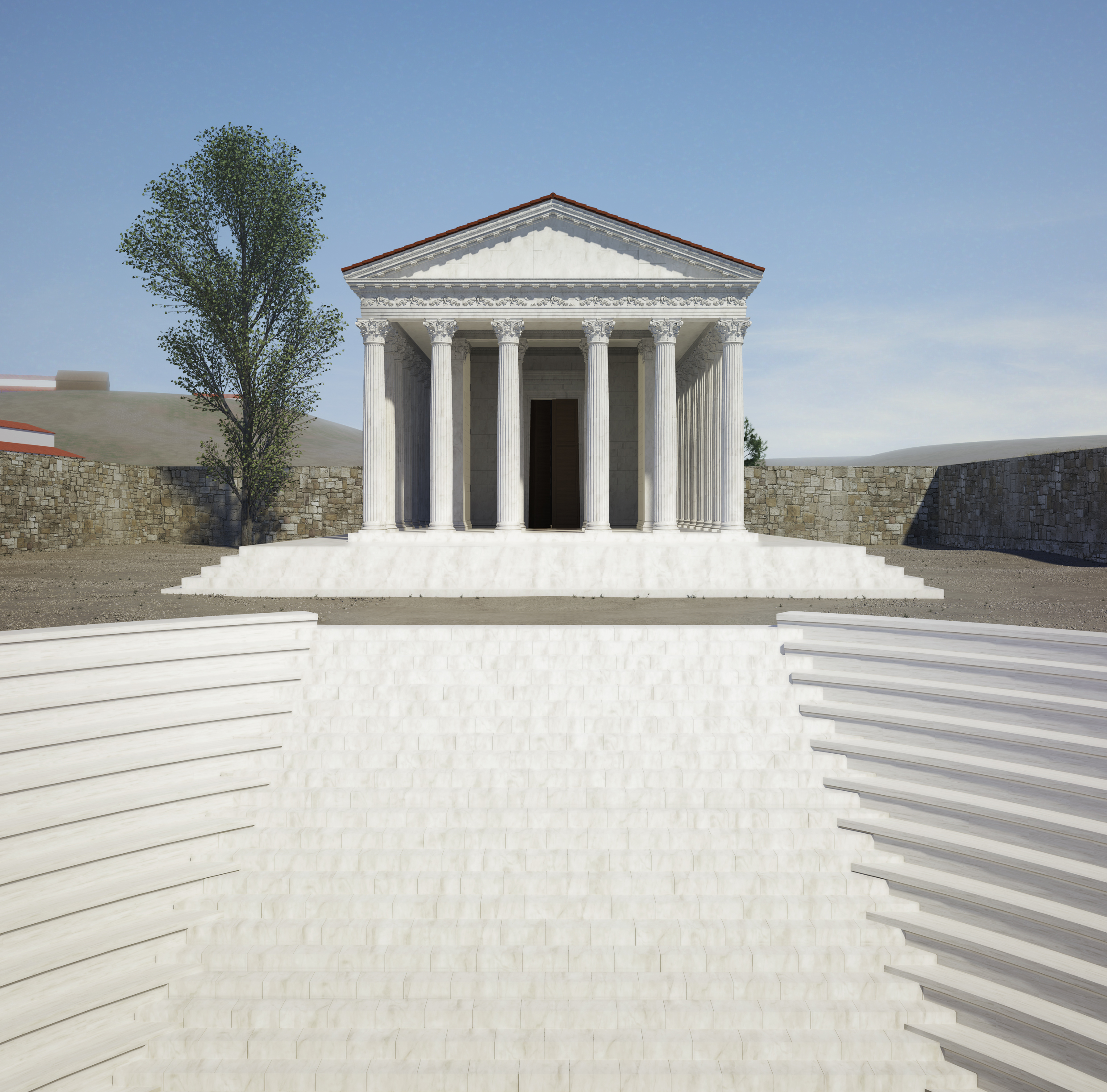
3D visualisation of the Corinthian peripteros at Pessinus (by A. Verlinde).

From the inscriptions it appears that Pessinus possessed several public buildings, including a gymnasium, a theatre, an archive, and baths. A system of water supply has been discovered through gutters and terracotta pipes. The most impressive public construction of the early Imperial period was the canalisation system, the earliest part of which dates from the Augustan age. It was meant to retain and carry away the waters of the Gallos, the seasonal river which traverses Pessinus and which was the main north-south artery (cardo maximus) of the city. From the 1st to the 3rd century AD the canal was continuously expanded until it finally reached a length of ca. 500 m and a width of 11 to 13 m. It is not known when exactly the large theatre, of which is preserved only the emplacement of the cavea where the spectators were seated, was constructed, but it was repaired or embellished by Hadrian.

Other monumental buildings, erected under the reign of Tiberius, included the marble peripteros temple of the provincial Imperial cult, a Sebasteion, on a hill at the north-western end of the canal, a stairway combined with a theatre in front (with an orchestra where religious and other performances such as gladiator fights took place). The colonnaded square lower down the valley was reconstructed by Verlinde. In the past, this structure was wrongly situated in the Tiberian era, but it was shown that it was a monument of the Hellenistic age (late 2nd-early 1st century BC), and contemporary with the citadel that preceded the temple complex.

=== Late Antiquity ===
Christianity reached the area in the 3rd century, and at the end of the 4th century, the temple of Augustus was decommissioned. Perhaps as a sign of the rise of Christianity in Pessinus, Emperor Julian the Apostate made a pilgrimage to Pessinus and wrote an angry letter concerning the disrespect shown to the sanctuary of Cybele. In ca. 398, Pessinus was established as the capital of the newly established province of Galatia Salutaris (in the civil Diocese of Pontus), and became the seat of a Metropolitan Archbishop. The region later became part of the Byzantine Anatolic Theme.

In late 715 AD, the city of Pessinus was destroyed by an Arab raid, along with the neighboring city Orkistos. The area remained under Byzantine control until lost to the Seljuk Turks in the latter 11th century, after which Pessinus became an inconspicuous mountain village at 900m height, gradually getting depopulated since it was fully protected.

== Ecclesiastical history ==
Circa AD 398, Pessinus was established as the capital of the newly established Roman province of Galatia Salutaris (=Secunda), and became the seat of a Metropolitan Archdiocese, under the sway of the Patriarchate of Constantinople.

Despite the Arab sack of the city in the 7th century, it had archbishops at least until the 11th century, but ultimately the see was suppressed, being truly in partibus infidelium under Turkish (Seljuk, later Ottoman) Muslim rule.

It was nominally revived in the early 20th century, both in a Latin (extant) and in an Armenian Catholic (short-lived) line of apostolic succession.

=== Ecclesiastical province ===
- The Notitia Episcopatuum of pseudo-Epifanius, edited under the Byzantine emperor Heraclius I (circa 640), ranks the see of Pessinus 18th amongst the Metropolitans in the Patriarchate of Constantinople and has seven suffragans: Amorium, Claneus (has been made a titular bishopric), Eudoxias (a titular bishopric), Petinessus (a titular bishopric), Trocmades (also titular bishopric; nicknamed (P)lotinus after its patron saint], not the philosopher, 'Germocolonia' (i.e. Germa in Galatia) and 'Palia' (sic; cfr. Spalea below?).
- The Notitia Episcopatuum under the Byzantine emperor Leo VI the Wise or the Philosopher (866–912) ranks Pessinus as the 19th Metropolitanate, but with a greatly altered set of seven suffragans: again 'Germocolonia', again '(P)Lotinus' (= above Trocmades), again Petinessus, 'Synodium' (sic, unidentified, perhaps an error), 'Sant'Agapeto' (i.e. Myrica, a titular see), Orcistus (titular see) and 'Spalea', plausibly Justinianopolis in Galatia (titular see).

=== Residential (Byzantine) Metropolitan Archbishops ===
The following incumbents are historically known :

- Demetrius (first documented circa 403 - circa 405 exiled)
- Pius (in 431)
- Teoctistus (fl. 449–451)
- Acacus (on 536)
- Georgius (circa 600)
- Johannes (in 680)
- Constantinus (in 692)
- Gregorius (in 787)
- Eustratius (in 879)
- Eusebius (fl. 944–945)
- Genesius (from a seal, first half tenth century)
- Nicolaus (in 1054).

=== Latin Titular see ===
The Roman Catholic archdiocese was nominally restored no later than 1901, when Pessinus of the Latins was recorded as Latin Metropolitan Titular archbishopric of Pessinus (Italian: Pessinonte (Curiate); Latin: Pessinuntin(us)).

The titular see had the following incumbents, so far of the Metropolitan (highest) rank:

- Vincenzo Di Giovanni (22 March 1901 - 20 July 1903; died in office)
- Emilio Parodi, C.M. (27 March 1905 - 10 October 1905; later Archbishop of Sassari)
  - Isaac Hagian (6 May 1905 – 1908; died in office)
- Constant-Ludovic-Marie Guillois (31 May 1907 - 22 October 1910; died in office)
- Antun Bauer (20 January 1911 - 26 April 1914; later Archbishop of Zagabria)
- Robert William Spence, O.P. (2 May 1914 - 6 July 1915, later Archbishop of Adelaide)
- José Alves de Mattos (9 December 1915 - 9 April 1917; died in office)
- William Barry (7 April 1919 - 8 May 1926; later Archbishop of Hobart)
- Nicola Giannattasio (24 June 1926 - 24 August 1959; died in office)
- Gerald Patrick Aloysius O'Hara (17 October 1959 - 16 July 1963; died in office)
- Paul Joseph Marie Gouyon (6 September 1963 - 4 September 1964; later Archbishop of Rennes)
- Gabriel Ganni (2 March 1966 - 15 January 1971; later Archbishop of Bassora)

It has since been vacant.

=== Armenian Catholic titular see ===
In 1905 Pessinus of the Armenians was established as the Armenian Catholic Metropolitan Titular archbishopric of Pessinus (Italian: Pessinonte (Curiate Italiano), Latin: Pessinuntin(us) Armenorum). In 1915 it was suppressed, having had a singular incumbent, of the Metropolitan (highest) rank:

- Isaac Hagian (5 June 1905 – 1908?) as emeritate, formerly first Archbishop of Sebaste of the Armenians (1892 – 1905).

== Excavation history ==
The temple area at Pessinus was rediscovered in 1834 by the French architect and archaeologist Charles Texier in the south of the village along the Gallos river, and was excavated under the auspices of Ghent University in 1967–1973 under the directorship of Pieter Lambrechts and in 1987–2008 under the directorship of John Devreker. Angelo Verlinde's 2012 PhD dissertation, published in 2015, is on the temple.

As yet, the temple area (sector B) is the only thoroughly investigated area of the city, with the exception of the so-called Acropolis (sector I) near the northern entrance of the Ballıhisar valley. Since 2009, the city has been investigated by a team from the University of Melbourne, led by Gocha R. Tsetskhladze.

== Sources and external links ==
- GCatholic - Latin titular see
- GCatholic - Armenian Catholic former titular see
- GUPEDA (Ghent University Pessinus Excavations Digital Archive)
- Ghent University website
- Verlinde, A. 2010, Monumental Architecture in Julio-Claudian Pessinus, Babesch 85, 111-139.
- "Pessinus" . Encyclopædia Britannica. Vol. 21 (11th ed.). 1911.
- Pessinus at www.archaeology.ugent.be
- Westermann Grosser Atlas zur Weltgeschichte

== Bibliography ==
Ancient site

- Roller, Lynn Emrich (1999). In Search of God the Mother: The Cult of Anatolian Cybele. Berkeley and Los Angeles, California: University of California Press. pp. 192–194. ISBN 0-520-21024-7.

Ecclesiastical history

- Heinrich Gelzer, Ungedruckte und ungenügend veröffentlichte Texte der Notitiae episcopatuum, in: Abhandlungen der philosophisch-historische classe der bayerische Akademie der Wissenschaften, 1901, p. 534, nº 25.
- Pius Bonifacius Gams, Series episcoporum Ecclesiae Catholicae, Leipzig 1931, p. 441
- Michel Lequien, Oriens christianus in quatuor Patriarchatus digestus, Paris 1740, vol. I, cols. 489-492
- Sophrone Pétridès, lemma 'Pessinus', in Catholic Encyclopedia, vol. XI, New York 1911
