= Islam in Namibia =

Quba Mosque in Windhoek

Namibia is a predominantly Christian country and is home to a small Muslim community.

Islam is a minority religion in Namibia, with a small but longstanding presence in the country. Islam first took root during the late 19th century in Namibia in the port city of Luderitz where a small community of Indian traders and merchants settled in the late 19th century. These early Muslims built the first mosque in Namibia, which still stands today and serves as a hub of the Muslim community in Luderitz.

Islam spread to other parts of Namibia, particularly the capital city of Windhoek, where there are several mosques and Islamic organizations. There is also a significant number of Muslims in the northern part of the country, particularly in the regions of Oshana and Ohangwena.

The Namibian Muslim community is diverse, with followers from various ethnicities and nationalities, including Indians, Pakistanis, Arabs, and Africans and is largely concentrated in urban areas.

Islam in Namibia is practiced in a relatively liberal manner, with the majority of Muslims following the Hanafi school of thought. There has been an increase in interest in Islam among Namibians of non-Muslim backgrounds, with some converts citing the religion's emphasis on social justice and its prohibition of alcohol as attractive features.

== History ==
The history of Islam in Namibia dates back to the late 19th century, when a small community of Indian traders and merchants settled in the port city of Luderitz. These early Muslims built the first mosque in Namibia, which still stands today and serves as a hub of the Muslim community in Luderitz.

== Number of Muslims ==
Islam has a small but growing presence in Namibia, with an estimated 70,000 Muslims in the country, many of whom are Nama. The religion has gained a significant following among the Nama tribe, with many citing the clarity of Islamic texts, the beauty of the content and the style of writing, and the unity and brotherhood of Muslims as attractive features of the religion.

Islam along with Judaism, Buddhism, and the Baháʼí Faith, which make up the largest minority religions in Namibia, but combined account for less than 1% of the population of Namibia.

== Growth of Namibia's Muslim community ==
Most of Namibia's Muslim community are members of the Nama ethnic group. It is believed that this is mostly as a result of the efforts of a prominent politician among the Nama, Jacobs Salmaan Dhameer, who converted to Islam in 1980 The first mosque in the country, the Soweto Islamic Centre, was established 1986 and is located in Katutura. As of May 2009, there were twelve mosques in the country, six in Windhoek, two in Katima Mulilo, one in Walvis Bay, and three in the north of the country in the former Ovamboland.

The Namibia Islamic Judicial Council is based in Windhoek in the Khomas Region. NIHA (Namibia Islamic Halaal Association) is Namibia's oldest and most well known Halaal Certifying body, recognised by the Halaal Certification body in South Africa and in many Islamic states. NIHA was established in 2001 and before known as the Namibia Halaal Slaughterers Association. It certifies food outlets in the country.

== See also ==
- Religion in Namibia
