= Eudoxias =

City and bishopric in Asia minor

Coordinates: 39°27′18″N 31°44′46″E

Eudoxias was a city and bishopric in the late Roman province of Galatia Secunda, in Asia Minor.

== Location ==
Eudoxias is mentioned only by Hierocles and the Notitiae episcopatuum of the Patriarchate of Constantinople.

The original name of the town is unknown, Eudoxias being the name given to it in honour either of the mother or of the daughter of Theodosius II. It was perhaps Gordion, where Alexander the Great cut the Gordian knot, and stood perhaps at the modern Yürme, in the vilayet of Angora. Others, however, identify Eudoxias with Akkilaion, whose site is unknown, and place Germe at Yürme. Modern scholars tentatively identify a location near Hamamkarahisar.

== Bishopric ==
The see was a suffragan of Pessinus.

Two bishops are known, Aquilas in 451 and Menas in 536. Another is spoken of in the life of Theodore of Sycae, about the end of the sixth century.

It is included in the Catholic Church's list of titular sees.
