= Oshikuku Constituency =

Electoral constituency in the Omusati region of northern Namibia

Coordinates: 17°39′S 15°28′E

Oshikuku Constituency (red) in the Omusati Region

Oshikuku Constituency is an electoral constituency in the Omusati Region of Namibia. It had 9,701 registered voters in 2020. The constituency office is situated in Oshikuku.

Oshikuku Constituency covers an area of 277 km^{2} (107 sq mi). It had a population of 9,093 in 2011, up from 8,299 in 2001.

== Politics ==
Oshikuku is traditionally a stronghold of the South West Africa People's Organization (SWAPO) party. The 2004 regional election was won by SWAPO politician Petrus Endjambi. He received 2,947 of the 2,982 votes cast.

In the 2015 local and regional elections SWAPO candidate Modestus Amutse won uncontested and became councillor after no opposition party nominated a candidate. The SWAPO candidate won the 2020 regional election by a large margin. Matheus Gabriel obtained 3,815 votes, followed by Kassian Kanyemba of the Independent Patriots for Change (IPC), an opposition party formed in August 2020, with 607 votes.
