= Claneus =

Ancient city and bishopric in Asia Minor

Coordinates: 38°37′24″N 31°50′06″E

Claneus or Klaneos or Klaneous (Ancient Greek: Κλάνεος or Κλανεοῦς) was an ancient city and bishopric in Asia Minor. Its site is tentatively located near Turgut, Yunak, Turkey. Claneus was in the Roman province of either Phrygia Salutaris or Galatia Secunda.

== Ecclesiastical history ==
Claneus became a suffragan bishopric of the Metropolitan of Pessinus, in Galatia Salutaris (erected 398). When Amorium, its former fellow suffragan of Pessinus, became a Metropolitan see in the ninth century, Claneus became its suffragan.

Two of its bishops are historically recorded:

- Salomon, attending the (Sixth Ecumenical =) Third Council of Constantinople (680–681, which repudiated as heresies Monothelitism and Monoenergism) and probably the appended Quinisext Council, alias Council in Trullo (692, addressing matters of discipline);
- Nicephorus, listed at the Second Council of Nicaea (787, which restored the veneration of icons and repudiated iconoclasm).

=== Titular see ===
The diocese was nominally restored in 1933 as Latin Titular bishopric of Claneus (Latin) / Claneo (Curiate Italian) / Clanien(sis) (Latin adjective).

It has been vacant for decades, and has had only these incumbents, of episcopal (lowest) rank:

- Francis Esser, Oblates of Saint Francis de Sales (O.S.F.S.) (German) (13 January 1949 – 12 September 1962), first as Apostolic Vicar of Keetmanshoop (ex-German Namibia) (13 January 1949 – 1956), then as Coadjutor Bishop of Keimoes (South Africa) (1956 – 12 September 1962); later succeeded as Bishop of Keimoes (12 September 1962 – death 8 December 1966).
- George Henry Speltz (12 February 1963 – 31 January 1968) as Auxiliary Bishop of Diocese of Winona (USA) (12 February 1963 – 4 April 1966) and (promoted) as Coadjutor Bishop of Saint Cloud (USA) (4 April 1966 – 31 January 1968); later succeeded as Bishop of Saint Cloud (31 January 1968 – 13 January 1987).

== Sources and external links ==
- GCatholic - (former and) titular see

Bibliography

- Heinrich Gelzer, Ungedruckte und ungenügend veröffentlichte Texte der Notitiae episcopatuum, in: Abhandlungen der philosophisch-historische classe der Bayerische Akademie der Wissenschaften, 1901, p. 539, nº 247
- Pius Bonifacius Gams, Series episcoporum Ecclesiae Catholicae, Leipzig 1931, p. 441
- Michel Lequien, Oriens christianus in quatuor Patriarchatus digestus, Paris 1740, vol; I, coll. 491-492
- Raymond Janin, lemma 'Claneus', in Dictionnaire d'Histoire et de Géographie ecclésiastiques, vol. XII, Paris 1953, col. 1061
