= Cimbebasia =

Former name for part of Southern Africa

Cimbebasia was the name given for a long time to the western part of Southern Africa. Its borders in the north were the Kunene River, the lower Kasai River and the western reaches of the Zambezi River.

== Missionary history ==
Originally Cimbebasia was included in the immense vicariate apostolic made up of Senegambia, French Guinea and Portuguese Guinea, which had been erected in 1842 and of which Bishop Barron was appointed first vicar Apostolic. The Congregation of Propaganda separated Cimbebasia on 3 July 1879 from this vicariate and made of it a prefecture Apostolic. The Congrégation du Saint-Esprit et de l’Immaculé Cœur de Marie were placed in charge of the new field, and Father Duparquet of the same congregation was appointed first prefect Apostolic. The new mission was, however, still very large, being made up of three distinct regions: the northern part, which included the territory of the Amboella and Gangela and was under the influence of Portugal; the southern part, composed of Ovamboland and Damaraland, coming under the control of Germany; and Bechuanaland. After having tried to found stations in all these different territories, the missionaries decided to concentrate their efforts on the northern part of the prefecture. The superior general of the congregation therefore requested the Holy See to confide to other institutes the remaining sections of the vicariate.

Consequently, Propaganda Fide placed the northern part of the vicariate, under the name of the Prefecture of Upper Cimbebasia, in charge of the Congrégation du Saint-Esprit on 1 August 1892, while the German territory was called the Prefecture of Lower Cimbebasia, and given to the fathers of the Missionary Oblates of Mary Immaculate. Bechuanaland was then united to the vicariate of the Orange Free State.

=== Prefecture Apostolic of Upper Cimbebasia ===
The Prefecture of Upper Cimbebasia was bounded on the north by the Kassai River, on the east by the 22nd degree of longitude east, on the west by the upper course of the Kunene, and on the south by the degree of latitude determined by the lower course of the Kunene. This degree of latitude also formed the boundary line between the Portuguese and German possessions in Southern Africa.

Under the direction of the prefect Apostolic, 20 priests and 8 Brothers of the Holy Ghost Fathers laboured for the evangelization of this territory, aided by 40 catechists and five Sisters of St. Joseph of Cluny. There were seven (7) stations: Kakonda, Bailundo, Bihe, Katoko, Kassengue, Massaka, and Kuniama; 28 flourishing schools containing 1600 boys and 1100 girls, of whom 374 boys and 123 girls having their home at the schools. The Catholic population numbered about 10,200, of whom 9000 natives. During 1903 and 1904 there were 806 children and 491 adults baptized.

=== Prefecture Apostolic of Lower Cimbebasia ===
It was bounded on the north by the degree of latitude determined by the lower course of the Kunene River; on the east by the 22nd degree of longitude east; on the south by the 23rd degree of south latitude, in such manner that the town of Rehoboth was included in the Vicariate Apostolic of the former Orange Free State, next the Orange River Colony; on the west by the Atlantic. The region was under the colonial control of Germany. The prefecture was erected by a decree of Propaganda Fide of 1 August 1892, which divided the earlier prefecture of Cimbebasia. The Oblate Fathers of the Immaculate Mary had charge of the mission under the prefect Apostolic, who resided at Windhoek, the principal station. Other mission stations were: Little Windhoek, Nobra, Swakopmund, Usakos, Aminuis, Tpukiro, Omaruru and Okumbabe.

In the early 20th century the Catholics numbered about 1000, some 800 being Europeans. The labourers in the evangelization of this field were: 20 priests, 17 brothers, and 11 Missionary Sisters of St. Francis. There were 11 schools with 500 pupils, and 2 orphanages with 108 orphans.

In 1921, it was renamed as Apostolic Prefecture of Cimbebasia. Five years later, it was promoted as Apostolic Vicariate of Windhoek. On 14 March 1994, it was finally promoted as Metropolitan Archdiocese of Windhoek.

== See also ==
List of Roman Catholic dioceses in Africa
