= Ogongo Agricultural College =

- Type: Agricultural college
- Established: 1973
- Location: Ogongo, Omusati, Namibia; 17.6780°S 15.2957°E

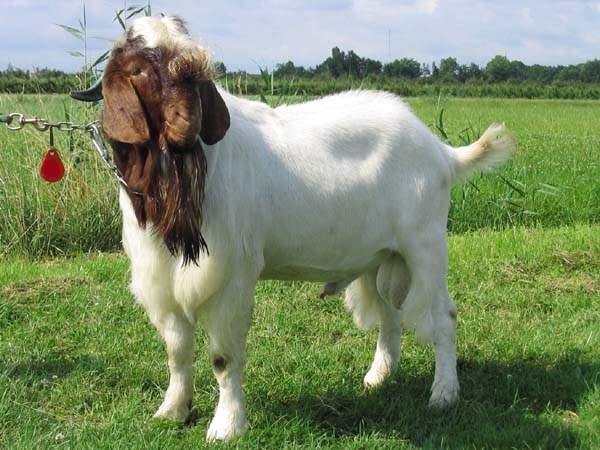
A Boer goat buck, This is some of the breed of goat found at Ogongo Agricultural College

The Ogongo Agricultural College is a college in Ogongo in the Omusati Region of northern Namibia. The college was founded in 1973 to train locals in agriculture. The college was closed between 1988 and 1992 due to civil disorder. The Ogongo Agricultural College is part of the University of Namibia and it has led to job creation for the local population and attracts visitors from across the country as well as abroad. Apart from employment, the college, which is at the moment known as the University of Namibia Ogongo Campus offers the inhabitants a variety of agricultural products such as milk, vegetables as well as meat. The Campus is on a 4,350 ha (10,700 acres) farm of which 1,000 ha (2,500 acres) serves as a game park.
