= St. Mary's Cathedral, Rundu =

St. Mary's Cathedral
- St. Mary's Cathedral
- Location: Rundu
- Country: Namibia
- Denomination: Roman Catholic Church

The St. Mary's Cathedral or simply Cathedral of Rundu is a religious building belonging to the Catholic Church and is located in the street Safari, in the town of Rundu on the northern tip of the African country of Namibia, specifically in the region of Kavango East. This is one of the three Catholic cathedrals of that nation and one of 2 dedicated to St. Mary, the other being located in the capital Windhoek.

It is a temple that follows the Roman or Latin rite and functions as the headquarters of the Apostolic Vicariate of Rundu (Vicariatus Apostolicus Runduensis) which was created in March 1994 with the bull Sollicitam sane curam of Pope John Paul II.

== See also ==
- Roman Catholicism in Namibia
