= Nuuyoma Senior Secondary School =

Coordinates: 17.6529°S 15.4713°E

Location
- Oshakati, Namibia; Omusati; Namibia

Information
- Established: 1985
- Founder: Bonifatius Nampira
- Principal: Bonifatius Nampira
- Principal: Natalia Nakaambo
- Principal: Monde Mwiihangele

Nuuyoma Senior Secondary School is a state secondary school in Namibia, located in Oshikuku, Omusati region. The school was inaugurated in 1985 and its founding principal was Bonifatius Nampira. It provides education from grade 8 to grade 12, and currently has about 900-1500 pupils. The school has a hostel.

== History ==
Nuuyoma Senior Secondary School was established in 1985. Bonifatius Nampira had worked as a principal teacher before rising to the position of circuit Inspector. After that, Natalia Nakaambo was appointed as the new principal of the school. At the time of Nakaambo, the school had no kitchen or dining hall because they were destroyed by the fire that destroyed the entire hostel section in June 2004. The pupils' food had to be prepared at Iipumbu Secondary School in Oshakati and transported 30 kilometres to Oshikuku three times a day.

== Extracurricular activities ==
Nuuyoma Senior Secondary School takes part in sports as part of extracurricular activities. In 2015, the school won a football competition launched by Old Mutual Namibia and received a new photocopy machine, whilst the sport ground dressing room renovated and received a new sport kit (these were all part of the winning prize). Since Nuuyoma is the only school in the region with a standard football field, it serves as the venue for most regional sport events.
