= Apostolic Vicariate of Rundu =

Roman Catholic missionary jurisdiction in Namibia

Apostolic Vicariate of Rundu Vicariatus Apostolicus Runduensis

Location
- Country: Namibia
- Metropolitan: Windhoek
- Coordinates: 17°55′01″S 19°46′32″E

Statistics
- Area: 140,046 km^{2} (54,072 sq mi)
- Population: Total; Catholics: (as of 2004); 298,976; 91,464 (30.6%)

Information
- Rite: Latin Rite
- Cathedral: St. Mary's Cathedral

Current leadership
- Bishop: Linus Ngenomesho, O.M.I.
- Bishops emeritus: Joseph Shipandeni Shikongo, O.M.I.

The Apostolic Vicariate of Rundu (Latin: Vicariatus Apostolicus Runduensis) is a Roman Catholic apostolic vicariate in Namibia (southwestern Africa). Its cathedral episcopal seat is St. Mary's in the city of Rundu.

Although a missionary pre-diocesan jurisdiction, it is not exempt but a suffragan in the ecclesiastical province of the Metropolitan Archdiocese of Windhoek.

== History ==
- Established on March 14, 1994 as Apostolic Vicariate of Rundu, on territory split off from the then Apostolic Vicariate of Windhoek (now its Metropolitan).

== Episcopal ordinaries ==
(missionary members of Roman rite congregations)

Apostolic Vicars of Rundu

- Joseph Shipandeni Shikongo, Missionary Oblates of Mary Immaculate (O.M.I.), Titular Bishop of Capra (March 14, 1994 – November 16, 2020)
- Linus Ngenomesho, Missionary Oblates of Mary Immaculate (O.M.I.), (May 11, 2026 - present)
