= St. Barbara Catholic Church (Namibia) =

Church in Tsumeb, Namibia

Coordinates: 19.245387°S 17.720003°E

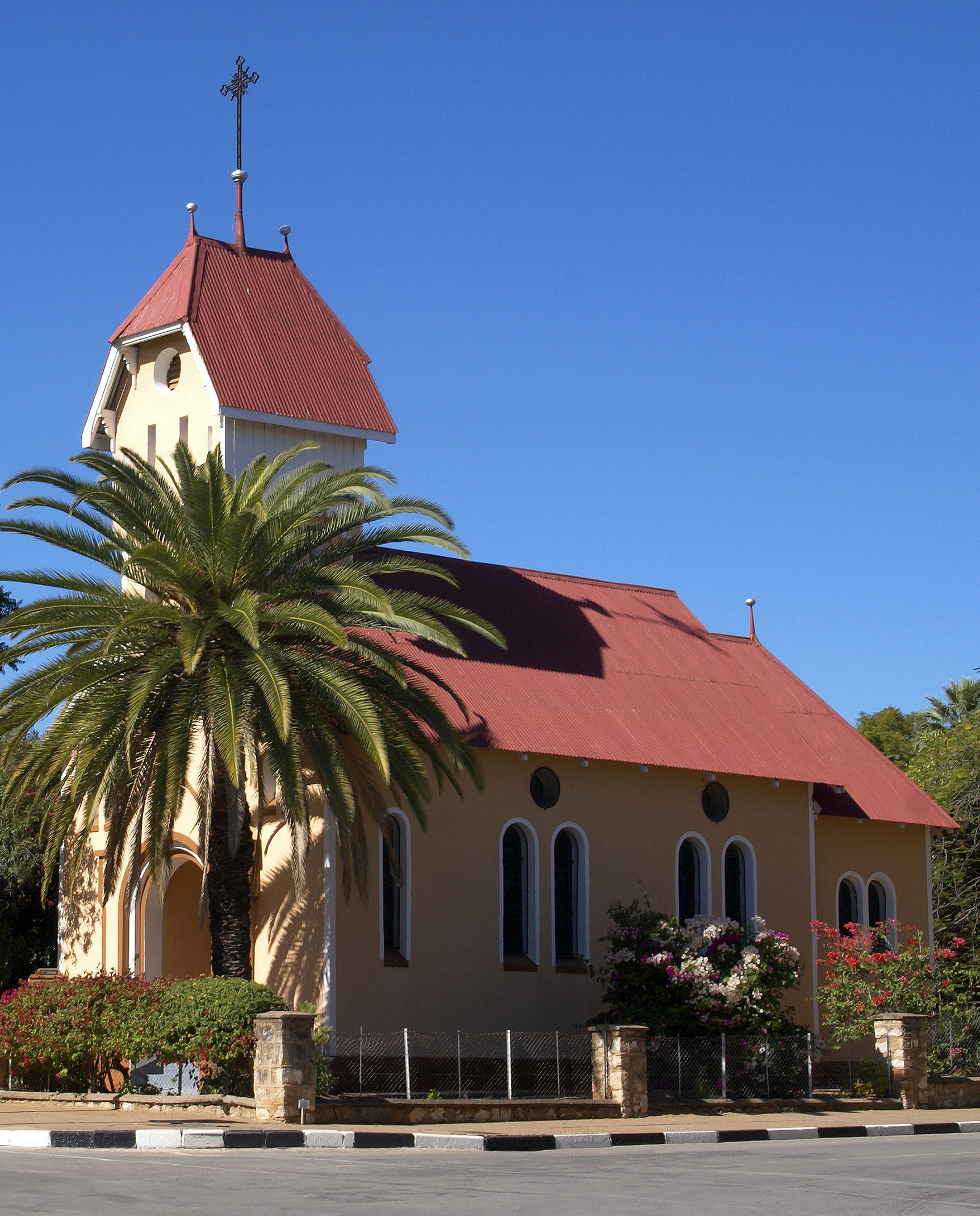
St. Barbara Catholic Church in Tsumeb

St. Barbara Catholic Church is a Roman Catholic church in downtown Tsumeb, Oshikoto Region, Namibia. Built in 1914, the church is dedicated to Saint Barbara, the patron saint of mine workers. Tsumeb's economy is based on mining. In the 2000s, the Church dominated the view of downtown Tsumeb. It was built by the German South-West African colonial authorities. From the church's founding in 1914 until 1927, it functioned as the only operating church in the mining town.
