= Capra (Mauretania Caesariensis) =

Roman-Berber town in present-day Algeria

Roman Empire - Mauretania Caesariensis (125 AD)

Capra was an ancient Roman–Berber town in the province of Mauretania Caesariensis. The civitas was located in the present-day area of Béni Mansour and Béni Abbès, Algeria. It was a bishopric in the Roman Catholic Church.

== Ecclesiastical history ==
Victor Vitensis speaks of Capra Picta as a town in that province, where some Catholics sent there into exile under the Arian Genseric, king of the Vandals from 428 to 477, converted a great number of the local population to Christianity.

In the Notitia Provinciarum et Civitatum Africae, Primus, bishop of the church in Capra, appears in the list of the Catholic bishops whom Huneric summoned to Carthage in 484 and then exiled.

=== Titular see ===
No longer a residential bishopric, Capra is today listed by the Catholic Church as a titular see.

The ancient diocese was nominally restored in 1933 and since had the following incumbents, both of the lowest (episcopal) or intermediary (archiepiscopal) ranks :

- Titular bishop Alain Sauveur Ferdinand van Gaver, Paris Foreign Missions Society M.E.P. (1965.03.22 – 1965.12.18)
- Titular archbishop Joseph Floribert Cornelis, Benedictine Order (O.S.B.) (1967.04.13 – 1974.11.13)
- Titular bishop Hieronymus Herculanus Bumbun, Capuchin Friars (O.F.M. Cap.) (1975.12.19 – 1977.02.26) (later Archbishop)
- Titular bishop Anatole Milandou (1983.07.22 – 1987.10.03) (later Archbishop)
- Titular bishop Camillus Archibong Etokudoh (1988.01.18 – 1989.09.01)
- Titular bishop Joseph Shipandeni Shikongo, Missionary Oblates of Mary Immaculate (O.M.I.) (1994.03.14 – ...), Apostolic Vicar of Rundu (Namibia)

== Sources and external links ==
- GigaCatholic with incumbent biography links
