= Shambyu (mission) =

- Location within Namibia
- Coordinates: 17°54′26″S 20°01′53″E
- Country: Namibia
- Region: Kavango East
- Time zone: UTC+1 (SAST)
- Climate: BSh

Shambyu is a Catholic mission and a village in the Shambyu kingdom in Kavango East, Namibia. It is located 34 km east of Rundu.

The Catholic mission in Shambyu is called the St. Joseph's Catholic Mission. It was founded in 1930 by the Missionary Oblates of Mary Immaculate.

The mission is staffed by two native pastors, Fr. Berthold Mukongwa and Fr. Michael Murongo. The mission also has a clinic. There are also two hostels, the Don Bosco Hostel for boys and the Marian House Hostel for girls.

The population of the Shambyu area is approximately 21,000, of which 73% are youths and children, making up 2668 families. Catholicism is followed by 74,3% of people. The parish is spread over an area of ca. 2,500 km^{2}. The farthest outstation is 185 km and the nearest four km away from the mission. There are 39 outstations.
