= St. Mary's Cathedral, Windhoek =

Church in Windhoek, Namibia

Coordinates: 22°33′53″S 17°04′56″E

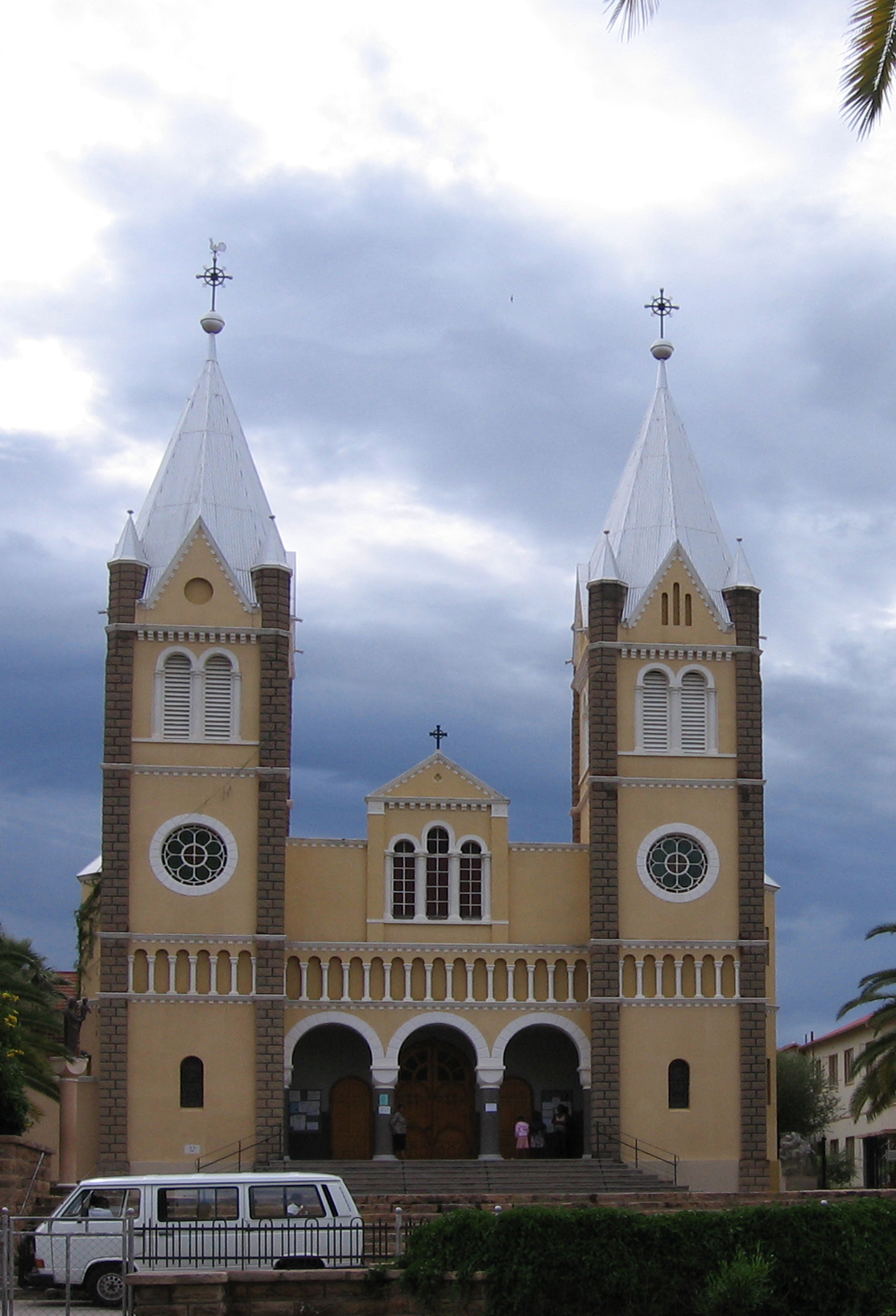

St. Mary's Cathedral, known as St. Marien Kathedrale in German, is a Roman Catholic church in Windhoek, Namibia. It is the seat of the Archdiocese of Windhoek. It is in the Karl-Werner street in the center of Windhoek and offers religious services every day except Monday night. It was built between 1906 and 1908 from local materials and elements of brick Romanesque Revival style.

The facade features a porch preceded by three semicircular arches topped by an arch and a triple. It is flanked by two quadrangular twin towers rising on four levels and crowned by arrows painted white.
