= Uukwambi =

Traditional kingdom in Namibia

Uukwambi is a traditional kingdom of the Ovambo people in what is today northern Namibia. Its capital is Elim.

The last king of Uukwambi was Iipumbu yaTshirongo, who was toppled by the South African authorities in 1932. Nowadays the highest traditional authority in Uukwambi is referred to as ‘head chief’ (‘elenga enene’).

Using the prefix uu- (Bantu noun class 14) to refer to the land belonging to the tribe sets the Kwambis apart from their neighbours the Ndongas and the Ngandjeras, who use the noun class 9 prefix instead (Ondonga and Ongandjera, respectively). This practice is however by no means unique to the Kwambis but is also found in some other parts of Bantu-speaking Africa. Compare for example ‘Uganda’, which signifies the land of the Ganda people, in the same way that ‘Uukwambi’ signifies the land of the Kwambi people.

The most important town of northern Namibia, Oshakati (Kwambi: Otshakati), is located within the traditional borders of Uukwambi.

Sam Nujoma, the first president of independent Namibia, is the son of Kwambi princess Helvi Mpingana Kondombolo.
