= Diocese of Keetmanshoop =

Roman Catholic diocese in Namibia

Coordinates: 26.5772°S 18.1306°E

Diocese of Keetmanshoop Dioecesis Keetmanshoopensis

Location
- Country: Namibia
- Metropolitan: Windhoek

Statistics
- Area: 264,110 km^{2} (101,970 sq mi)
- Population: Total; Catholics: (as of 2004); 137,675; 38,356 (27.9%)

Information
- Rite: Latin Rite
- Cathedral: St. Stanislaus Cathedral

Current leadership
- Pope: Leo XIV
- Bishop: Willem Christiaans, O.S.F.S
- Bishops emeritus: Philipp Pöllitzer, O.M.I.

The Diocese of Keetmanshoop (Latin: Keetmanshoopen(sis)) is a suffragan diocese in the Latin Rite Ecclesiastical province of the Metropolitan of Windhoek in Namibia, yet depends on the missionary Roman Congregation for the Evangelization of Peoples.

Its cathedral episcopal see is St. Stanislaus Cathedral, in the city of Keetmanshoop.

== Statistics ==
As per 2015, it pastorally served 42,570 Catholics (23.6% of 180,000 total population) on 264,110 km^{2} in 11 parishes and 32 missions with 16 priests (3 diocesan, 13 religious), 13 deacons, 65 lay religious (17 brothers, 48 sisters) and 2 seminarists.

== History ==
- July 7, 1909: Established as Apostolic Prefecture of Great Namaqualand, on territory split off from the then Apostolic Vicariate of Orange River in South Africa
- Promoted on July 14, 1930 as Apostolic Vicariate of Great Namaqualand
- January 13, 1949: Renamed after its see as Apostolic Vicariate of Keetmanshoop
- Promoted on March 14, 1994 as Diocese of Keetmanshoop

== Bishops ==
(all Roman rite, so far members of a missionary congregation)

Apostolic Prefects of Great Namaqualand

- Fr. Stanislaus von Krolikowski, O.S.F.S. (1910 – death 1923.01.21)
- Fr. Mattias Eder, O.S.F.S. (1923.03.16 – death 1930)

Apostolic Vicars of Great Namaqualand

- Joseph Klemann, O.S.F.S. (1931.02.24 – retired 1942), Titular Bishop of Drusiliana (1931.02.24 – death 1960.03.21)
- John Francis Eich, O.S.F.S. (1942.11.10 – death 1947.02.04), Titular Bishop of Cynopolis in Ægypto (1942.04.21 – 1947.02.04), succeeded as former Coadjutor Vicar Apostolic of Great Namaqualand (1942.04.21 – 1942.11.10)

Apostolic Vicars of Keetmanshoop

- Francis Esser, O.S.F.S. (1949.01.13 – 1956), Titular Bishop of Claneus (1949.01.13 – 1962.09.12), next Coadjutor Bishop of Keimoes (South Africa) (1956 – 1962.09.12), succeeding as Bishop of Keimoes (South Africa) (1962.09.12 – death 1966.12.08)
- Edward Francis Joseph Schlotterback, O.S.F.S. (1956.03.24 – retired 1989.10.02), Titular Bishop of Balanea (1956.03.24 – death 1994.12.09)
  - Apostolic Administrator Father Ludger G. Holling, O.S.F.S. (1989 – 1993.05.28), no other prelature
- Anthony Chiminello, O.S.F.S. (1993.05.28 – 1994.03.14 see below), Titular Bishop of Numana (1993.05.28 – 1994.03.14)

Suffragan Bishops of Keetmanshoop

- Anthony Chiminello, O.S.F.S. (see above 1994.03.14 – death 2002.11.23)
- Phillip Pöllitzer, O.M.I. (2007.05.31 – retired 2017.07.21)
- Willem Christiaans, O.S.F.S. (2018.02.07 – ...); no previous prelature.

=== Coadjutor Bishop ===
- John Francis Eich, O.S.F.S. (1942)

== See also ==
- List of Catholic dioceses in Namibia
- Roman Catholicism in Namibia

== Sources and External links ==
- GCatholic.org
- Catholic Hierarchy
- Diocese of Keetmanshoop website
