= Orcistus =

Ancient settlement in Turkey

Orcistus or Orkistos (Ancient Greek: Ὀρκιστός) was a city originally in the northeast of ancient Phrygia and later a bishopric in the Roman province of Galatia Secunda, situated south of the town now called Ortaköy, Afyonkarahissar, and previously Alikel Yaila.

== City status ==
Originally an independent city of Galatia, it was annexed to Nacolea in Phrygia in the late 3rd century AD but was restored to independence by Emperor Constantine the Great, to whom the inhabitants of Orcistus appealed in 325. Constantine granted their request in 331. He speaks of them as "supporters of the most holy religion", an ambiguous term that may perhaps refer to Christianity.

== Bishopric ==
By the 5th century, it was an episcopal see, as shown by the participation of bishops of Orcistus of the province of Galatia Secunda in the Council of Ephesus of 431 (Bishop Domnus), the Council of Chalcedon of 451 (Bishop Longinus), and the Council of Constantinople of 692 (Bishop Segermas).

Until the 13th century, the see of Orcistus continued to be mentioned in the Notitiae Episcopatuum as a suffragan of Pessinus, the metropolitan see of Galatia Secunda. It is included in the Catholic Church's list of titular sees.
