= Elim, Namibia =

Village in Namibia

Coordinates: 17°42′57″S 15°28′53″E

Elim (Namibia)

Elim is a village in the north-east of the Republic of Namibia. It is the district capital of the Elim Constituency in the administrative Omusati Region. It is situated in a formerly forested area that has largely been converted into agricultural grassland.

Elim is the centre of the Uukwambi traditional authority. The Monument for the Uukwambi Kings, erected at the site of the grave and the remains of the homestead of king Nuuyoma, the sixteenth king of the Uukwambi, is situated here.

== History ==
Elim was founded as a Finnish missionary station on 18 July 1870. Gradually, administration of the Lutheran parishes in Ovamboland was transferred from the Finnish missionaries to native ministers. Elim was one of eight such parishes and as such an important site of the Evangelical Lutheran Church in Namibia.

It has a well-developed infrastructure, including a clinic, church, constituency head office, community hall, mobile antenna, its own water supply, several shebeens, a 'China shop', a small grocery store and some schools, such as the Naango Junior Primary School, Elim Senior Primary and Ashipala Senior Secondary School. A market is held once a month, coinciding with the collection of pensions.

== Transport ==
There is one main road which cuts through Elim joining Oshikuku (on the Uutapi Main Road from Oshakati) to Ondalaye-ya-Elim (Okahao Main Road from Oshakati).
