= Galatia (Roman province) =

Roman province from 25 BC to 600s

Provincia Galatia Ἐπαρχία Γαλατίας
- Province of the Roman Empire
- 25 BC–7th century
- Capital: Ancyra
- Historical era: Classical Antiquity
  - Annexation by Augustus: 25 BC
  - Theme of the Anatolics established: 7th century
Preceded by	Succeeded by
Celtic Galatia	Bucellarian Theme; Anatolikon theme
- Today part of: Turkey

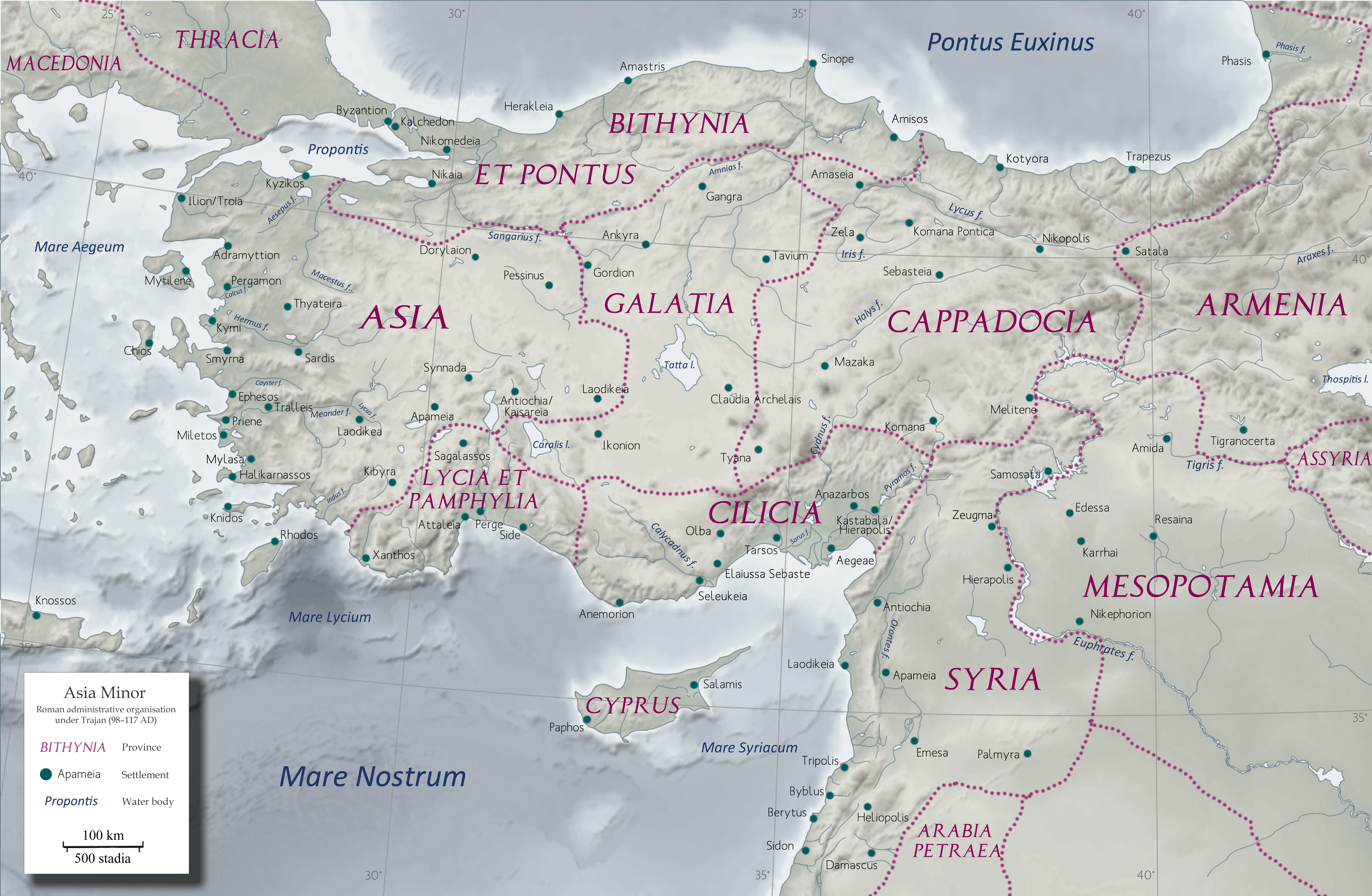
The Roman provinces of Asia Minor under Trajan, including Galatia

Galatia (/ɡəˈleɪʃə/) was the name of a province of the Roman Empire in Anatolia (modern central Turkey). It was established by the first emperor, Augustus (sole rule 30 BC – 14 AD), in 25 BC, covering most of formerly independent Celtic Galatia, with its capital at Ancyra.

Under the Tetrarchy reforms of Diocletian, its northern and southern parts were split to form the southern part of the province of Paphlagonia and the province of Lycaonia, respectively.

In c. 398 AD, during the reign of Arcadius, it was divided into the provinces of Galatia Prima and Galatia Secunda or Salutaris. Galatia Prima covered the northeastern part of the old province, retaining Ancyra as its capital and was headed by a consularis. Salutaris comprised the southwestern half of the old province and was headed by a praeses, with its seat at Pessinus. Both provinces were part of the Diocese of Pontus. The provinces were briefly reunited in 536–548 under Justinian I. Although the area was eventually incorporated in the new thema of Anatolikon in the latter half of the 7th century, traces of the old provincial administration survived until the early 8th century.

== Governors ==
(List based on Bernard Rémy, Les carrières sénatoriales dans les provinces romaines d'Anatolie au Haut-Empire (31 av. J.-C. - 284 ap. J.-C.) (Istanbul: Institut Français d'Études Anatoliennes-Georges Dumézil, 1989).)

First organization of the province of Galatia

- Marcus Lollius 25 - 22 BC
- Lucius Calpurnius Piso Pontifex 14 - 13 BC
- Cornutus Aquila 6 BC
- Publius Sulpicius Quirinius 5 - 3 BC
- Marcus Servilius Nonianus AD 3
- Marcus Plautius Silvanus 6 - 7
- Sextus Sotidius Strabo Libuscidianus 13 - 16
- Priscus c. 16 - 20 or 21
- Metilius c. 20 - 25 or 21 - 26
- Fronto c. 25 - 29 or 26 - 30
- Silvanus c. 29 - 33 or 30 - 34
- Titus Helvius Basila c. 33 to c. 37
- Marcus Annius Afrinus 49 – 54
- Quintus Petronius Umbrinus 54 - 55
- Lucius Nonius Calpurnius Torquatus Asprenas 68 - 70

(Between AD 70 and AD 111 Galatia was combined with Cappadocia. The governors for those years can be found at List of Roman governors of Cappadocia.)

Second organization of the province of Galatia

- Lucius Caesennius Sospes 111 - 114
- Gaius Julius Quadratus Bassus c. 114
- Lucius Catilius Severus 114 - 117?
- Lucius Cossonius Gallus 117 - 119
- Aulus Larcius Macedo 119 - 122
- Gaius Trebius Sergianus c. 127 - 130
- Julius Saturninus c. 130 - 136
- Gaius Julius Scapula c. 136 - 139
- Lucius Fulvius Rusticus Aemilianus Between 131 and 161
- Cornelius [Dex]ter c. 156 - 159 or 157 - 160
- Publius Juventius Celsus 161–163
- Lucius Fufidius Pollio 163 - 165
- Titus Licinnius Mucianus c. 175 - 177
- Lucius Saevinius Proculus c. 177 - 180
- Lucius Fabius Cilo c. 190 - 197
- [...] Valerianus [...]ninus c. 194 - 197
- Lucius Petronius Verus 197/198
- Gaius Atticus Norbanus Strabo 198-c. 201
- Publius Caecilius Urbicus Aemilianus c. 205 - 208
- Publius Alfius Maximus c. 183 - 185 or 213 - 215
- Lucius Egnatius Victor Lollianus c. 215 - 218
- Publius Plotius Romanus c. 218 - 221
- Lucius Julius Apronius Maenius Pius Salamallianus c. 221 - 224
- Quintus Aradius Rufinus Optatus Aelianus c. 224 - 227
- Quintus Servaeus Fuscus Cornelianus c. 229 - 230
- Marcus Domitius Valerianus c. 230 - 232
- Aurelius Basileus c. 227 - 229 or 232 - 235
- Marcus Junius Valerius Nepotianus 250
- Minicius Florentius After 250

== Ecclesiastical administration ==
According to the canons of the Council of Chalcedon (451) and the Synecdemus of Hierocles (c. 531), the province of Galatia Prima had Ancyra as its metropolitan see, with six suffragan sees: Tavium, Aspona, Kinna, Lagania or Anastasiopolis, Mnizos and Juliopolis.

According to the canons of the Council of Chalcedon and the Synecdemus, the province of Galatia Secunda had Pessinus as its metropolitan see, with eight suffragan sees: Orkistos, Petinessos, Amorium, Klaneos (absent in Chalcedon), Troknades, Eudoxias, Myrika and Germa or Myriangelon. Pessinus sank into decay when Justinianopolis was founded in the mid-6th century and eventually the metropolitan see was transferred there, while retaining his title.

== Sources ==
- Belke, Klaus; Restle, Marcell (1984). Tabula Imperii Byzantini, Band 4: Galatien und Lykaonien (in German). Vienna: Verlag der Österreichischen Akademie der Wissenschaften. ISBN 978-3-7001-0634-0.
- Ramsay, William M. (1890). The Historical Geography of Asia Minor. London: John Murray.
