= Justinianopolis (Galatia) =

Roman and Byzantine city and ancient Bishopric in Galatia

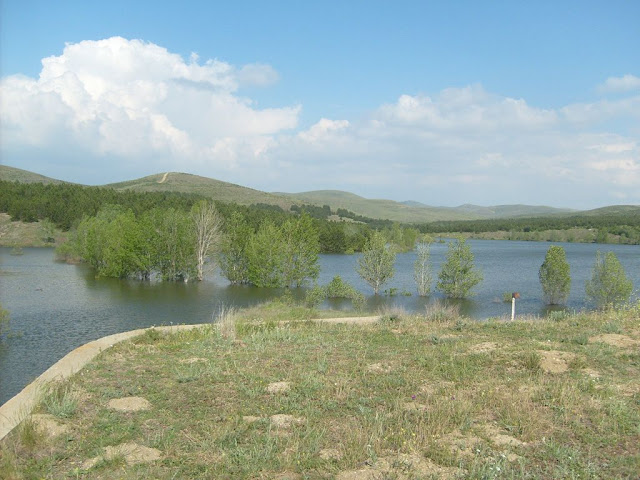
Area around Justinianopolis

Justinianopolis was a Roman and Byzantine era city and ancient Bishopric in Galatia. It has been identified with modern Sivrihisar, Eskişehir Province Central Anatolia, Turkey. It was one of several Ancient sites renamed in late Antiquity after Byzantine emperor Justinian I.

== History ==
It was built as one of a chain of defensive points in the Byzantine empire. and in 883 was recorded for the first time as the metropolis of the Province. The archbishop of Pessinus moved his see to the new capital at this time.

It is mentioned by Hierocles.

== Bishopric ==
The city was also the seat of an ancient Bishopric; little is known of the see, as it was not represented in the Church Councils.

== Sources ==
- Belke, Klaus; Restle, Marcell (1984). Tabula Imperii Byzantini, Band 4: Galatien und Lykaonien (in German). Vienna: Verlag der Österreichischen Akademie der Wissenschaften. ISBN 978-3-7001-0634-0.
- Ramsay, William M. (1890). The Historical Geography of Asia Minor. London: John Murray.
