= Roman Catholic Archdiocese of Windhoek =

Roman Catholic archdiocese in Namibia

Coordinates: 22.5686°S 17.0802°E

Archdiocese of Windhoek Archidioecesis Vindhoekensis

Location
- Country: Namibia

Statistics
- Area: 560,158 km^{2} (216,278 sq mi)
- Population: Total; Catholics: (as of 2023); 3,022,000; 363000 (12%%)

Information
- Rite: Latin Rite
- Cathedral: St. Mary's Cathedral

Current leadership
- Pope: Francis
- Bishop: Liborius Ndumbukuti Nashenda, O.M.I.

The Roman Catholic Archdiocese of Windhoek (Latin: Vindhoeken(sis)) is the Metropolitan See for the ecclesiastical province of Windhoek in Namibia. The predecessor to the current Archdiocese, the Prefecture Apostolic of Cimbebasia, was established in 1892 and the current archdiocese was fully erected in March 1994. The current archbishop is Liborius Ndumbukuti Nashenda.

== History ==
- August 1, 1892: Established as Apostolic Prefecture of Lower Cimbebasia from the Apostolic Prefecture of Cimbebasia in Angola
- January 10, 1921: Renamed as Apostolic Prefecture of Cimbebasia
- May 11, 1926: Promoted as Apostolic Vicariate of Windhoek
- March 14, 1994: Promoted as Metropolitan Archdiocese of Windhoek

== Special churches ==
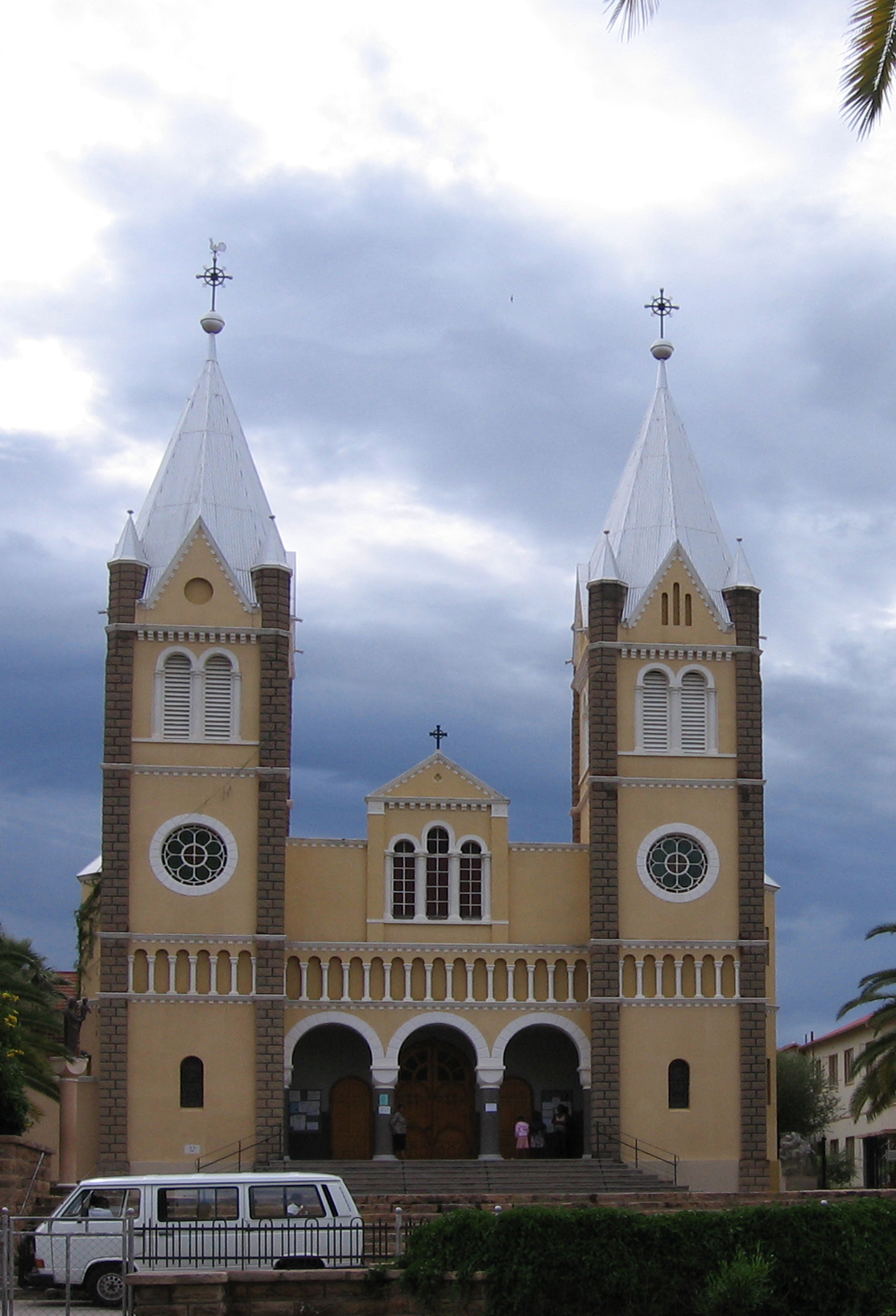
St. Mary's Cathedral, Windhoek

- The cathedral is St. Mary's Cathedral in Windhoek.

== Bishops ==
- Prefect Apostolic of Lower Cimbebasia (Roman rite)
  - Fr. Bernard Pierre Herrmann, O.M.I. (1892 – 1901)
  - Fr. Augustine Nachtwey, O.M.I. (1901.12 – 1908)
  - Fr. Joseph Schemmer, O.M.I. (1908.11.24 – 1909.12.17)
  - Fr. Eugène Klaeylé, O.M.I. (1909.12.18 – 1921.01.10)
- Prefect Apostolic of Cimbebasia (Roman rite)
  - Fr. Joseph Gotthardt, O.M.I. (1921.01.11 – 1926.05.11); see below''
- Vicars Apostolic of Windhoek (Roman rite)
  - Bishop Joseph Gotthardt, O.M.I. (1926.05.11 – 1961.03.20); see above
  - Bishop Rudolf Johannes Maria Koppmann, O.M.I. (1961.03.20 – 1980.11.29)
  - Bishop Bonifatius Haushiku, I.C.P. (1980.11.29 – 1994.03.14): see below
- Archbishops of Windhoek (Roman rite)
  - Archbishop Bonifatius Haushiku, I.C.P. (1994.03.14 – 2002.06.12); see above
  - Archbishop Liborius Ndumbukuti Nashenda, O.M.I. (since 2004.09.21)

=== Coadjutor Vicar Apostolic ===
- Rudolf Johannes Maria Koppmann, O.M.I. (1957-1961)

=== Auxiliary Bishops ===
- Liborius Ndumbukuti Nashenda, O.M.I. (1998-2004), appointed Archbishop here
- Bonifatius Haushiku, I.C.P. (1978-1980), appointed Vicar Apostolic here

== Suffragan dioceses ==
- Keetmanshoop
- Rundu

== See also ==
- Roman Catholicism in Namibia
