= Catholic Church in Namibia =

The Catholic Church in Namibia is part of the Catholic Church under the universal, direct jurisdiction of the supreme Vicar of Christ, the Bishop of Rome and the Catholic world, the Pope.

As of 2024, there were 693,000 Catholics in Namibia, about 22.8% of the total population; there were 101 priests and 452 nuns serving across 99 parishes.

The country is divided into two dioceses, including one archdiocese together with an Apostolic Vicariate. The archbishop is Liborius Ndumbukuti Nashenda.

== See also ==
- Religion in Namibia
- List of Catholic dioceses in Namibia

== Sources ==
- Archdiocese of Windhoek Catholic-hierarchy.org ^{[self-published]}
- https://stmarysnam.com/ official website
