= Eudocia =

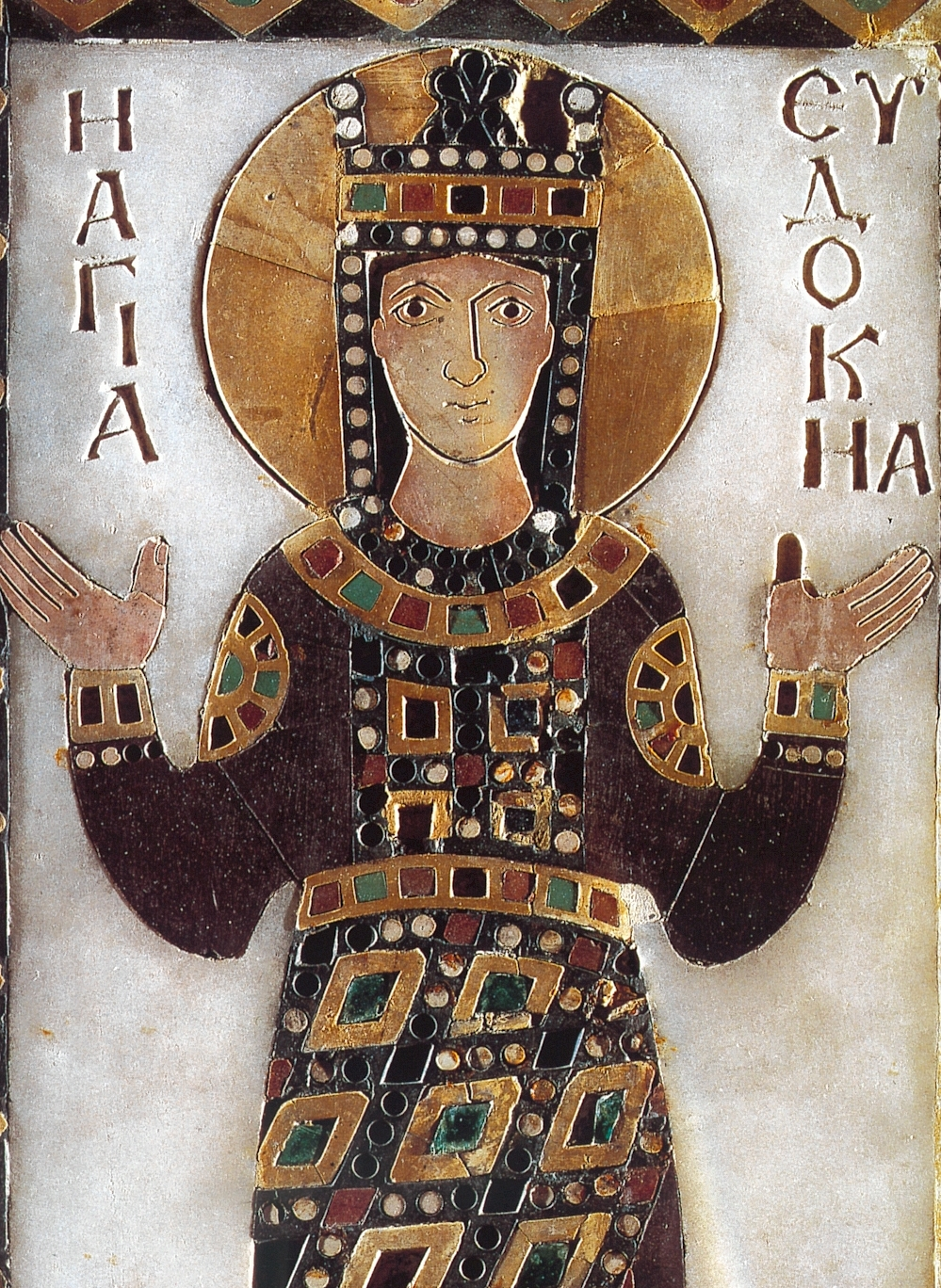
Icon of Saint Eudocia, inlay work in stone and ivory, 10th century.

Eudocia (Latin) or Eudokia (Ancient Greek: Εὐδοκία) is a female given name meaning "famous" or "well regarded". In Christian translations, its meaning is "good will" or "good teaching".

It was mainly popular in late antiquity and the Middle Ages, lingering on in Eastern Europe, particularly in honor of various saints. In modern Greek, the present pronunciation is romanized as Evdokia. Slavic forms of the name include Evdokiya (Bulgarian and Russian: Евдокия), Yevdokiya (Ukrainian: Євдокія), and Evdokija (Serbian: Евдокија).

The name is also frequently (mistakenly) conflated with Eudoxia and used for various places named after women named Eudocia.

== People ==
=== Nobility ===
- Aelia Eudocia (c. 401–460), also Saint Eudocia or Eudocia Augusta, Byzantine empress, wife of Theodosius II and daughter-in-law of Aelia Eudoxia
- Princess Eudocia (daughter of Valentinian III) (439–466/474?), daughter of Emperor Valentinian III and Licinia Eudoxia, wife of Vandal king Huneric
- Fabia Eudokia (c. 580–612), Byzantine empress, wife of the emperor Heraclius
- Eudokia (wife of Justinian II) (7th century), Byzantine empress, wife of Justinian II
- Eudokia (wife of Constantine V) (8th century), Byzantine empress, wife of Constantine V
- Eudokia Ingerina (c. 840 – c. 882), Byzantine empress, wife of the 10th century Emperor Basil I
- Eudokia Dekapolitissa (fl. 855–867), Byzantine empress, wife of Michael III
- Eudokia Baïana (died 901), Byzantine empress, wife of Leo VI the Wise
- Bertha-Eudokia of Provence (died 949), Byzantine empress
- Eudocia or Eudokia Makrembolitissa (1021–1096), Byzantine empress, wife of emperors Constantine X Doukas and Romanos IV Diogenes, putative author of a dictionary of history and mythology
- Eudokia Komnene, daughter of John II Komnenos (1087–1143), wife of Theodore Vatatzes
- Eudokia Komnene (daughter of Alexios I) (1094 – c. 1129), daughter of Alexios I Komnenos
- Eudokia Komnene, Lady of Montpellier (c. 1160 – c. 1203), wife of William VIII of Montpellier
- Eudokia Angelina (d. 1211, or later), Byzantine princess, consort of Stefan the First-Crowned of Serbia
- Eudokia Palaiologina (1265–1302), daughter of Michael VIII Palaiologos and his wife Theodora
- Maria Eutokia Toaputeitou (d. 1869), queen of the Polynesian island of Mangareva, wife of Maputeoa, mother of Joseph Gregorio II

== Evdokia ==
Evdokia, the modern Greek pronunciation of the name, may intend:

- Evdokia Bobyleva (1919–2017), Russian teacher
- Evdokia Gaer (1934–2019), Russian educator, politician and human rights activist
- Evdokia Kadi, Cypriot singer
- Evdokia (film), a 1971 film starring Maria Vassiliou, George Koutouzis, Koula Agagiotou, and Christos Zorbas
  - Evdokia zeibekiko, the characteristic zeibekiko song, taken from the film
- Evdokia Reshetnik, Ukrainian zoologist and ecologist

== Places ==
- Eudocia, former name of Tokat, Turkey
- Eudocia (Cappadocia), an ancient city in Anataolia in Turkey
- Eudocia (Lycia), an ancient city in Anatolia
- Eudocias (Pamphylia), an ancient city in Anatolia
- Eudocia (Phrygia), an ancient city in Anatolia

== See also ==
- Evdokija, Serbian variant
- Evdokiya, Russian and Bulgarian variant

== Sources ==
- Bell, David N. (1989). A Cloud of Witnesses: An Introductory History of the Development of Christian Doctrine. Alice Duthie-Clark, illustrator. Kalamazoo, MI: Cistercian Publications. ISBN 9780879076092. LCCN 88032283.
- Evangelatou, Maria (2014). "Threads of Power: Clothing Symbolism, Human Salvation, and Female Identity in the Illustrated Homilies by Iakobos of Kokkinobaphos". Dumbarton Oaks Papers. 68: 241–323. JSTOR 24643760.
- Hewson, Robert H. (2001). "Pulcheria (c.398–453)". In Commire, Anne; Klezmer, Deborah (eds.). Women in World History: A Biographical Encyclopedia. Vol. 12. Detroit: Yorkin Publications. ISBN 0-7876-4071-9. LCCN 99024692 – via Internet Archive.
- Marinis, Vasleios (2009). "Tombs and Burials in the Monastery tou Libos in Constantinople". Dumbarton Oaks Papers. 63: 147–166. JSTOR 41219765.
- Souville, E.M. (1924-12-25). "Last Year's Christmas Editorial, "Peace on Earth to Men of Good Will, Brings Forth a Theological Discussion". Manufacturers Record. Vol. 86, no. 26. pp. 55–6 – via Internet Archive.
