= Crime and Punishment =

1866 novel by Fyodor Dostoevsky

- 1956 Random House printing of Crime and Punishment, translated by Constance Garnett
- Author: Fyodor Dostoevsky
- Original title: Преступление и наказание
- Language: Russian
- Genre: Literary fiction
- Publisher: The Russian Messenger (series)
- Publication date: 1866; separate edition 1867
- Publication place: Russia
- Pages: 527
- OCLC: 26399697
- Dewey Decimal: 891.73/3 20
- LC Class: PG3326 .P7 1993
- Original text: Преступление и наказание at Russian Wikisource
- Translation: Crime and Punishment at Wikisource

Crime and Punishment (Note: Pre-reform Russian: Преступленіе и наказаніе; post-reform Russian: Преступление и наказание, romanized: Prestupleniye i nakazaniye, IPA: [prʲɪstʊˈplʲenʲɪje‿ɪ‿nəkɐˈzanʲɪje]) is a novel by the Russian author Fyodor Dostoevsky. It was first published in the literary journal The Russian Messenger in twelve monthly installments during 1866. It was later published in a single volume. It is the second of Dostoevsky's full-length novels following his return from ten years of exile in Siberia. Crime and Punishment is considered the first great novel of his mature period of writing and is often cited as one of the greatest works of world literature.

Crime and Punishment follows the mental anguish and moral dilemmas of Rodion Raskolnikov, an impoverished former law student in Saint Petersburg who plans to kill an unscrupulous pawnbroker, an old woman who stores money and valuable objects in her flat. He theorises that with the money he could liberate himself from poverty and go on to perform great deeds, and seeks to convince himself that certain crimes are justifiable if they are committed in order to remove obstacles to the higher goals of "extraordinary" men. Once the deed is done, however, he finds himself wracked with confusion, paranoia, and disgust. His theoretical justifications lose all their power as he struggles with guilt and horror and is confronted with both internal and external consequences of his deed.

== Background ==
At the time, Dostoevsky owed large sums of money to creditors and was trying to help the family of his brother Mikhail, who had died in early 1864. After appeals elsewhere failed, Dostoevsky turned as a last resort to the publisher Mikhail Katkov and sought an advance on a proposed contribution. He offered his story or novella (at the time, he was not thinking of a novel) for publication in Katkov's monthly journal The Russian Messenger—a prestigious publication of its kind, and the outlet for both Ivan Turgenev and Leo Tolstoy. Dostoevsky, having been engaged in polemical debates with Katkov in the early 1860s, had never published anything in its pages before. In a letter to Katkov written in September 1865, Dostoevsky explained to him that the work was to be about a young man who yields to "certain strange, 'unfinished' ideas, yet floating in the air". He planned to explore the moral and psychological dangers of the ideology of "radicalism", and felt that the project would appeal to the conservative Katkov. In letters written in November 1865, an important conceptual change occurred: the "story" had become a "novel". From then on, Crime and Punishment is referred to as a novel.

At the end of November much had been written and was ready; I burned it all; I can confess that now. I didn't like it myself. A new form, a new plan excited me, and I started all over again.

— Dostoevsky's letter to his friend Alexander Wrangel in February 1866

In the complete edition of Dostoevsky's writings published in the Soviet Union, the editors reassembled the writer's notebooks for Crime and Punishment in a sequence roughly corresponding to the various stages of composition. As a result, there exists a fragmentary working draft of the novella, as initially conceived, as well as two other versions of the text. These have been distinguished as the Wiesbaden edition, the Petersburg edition, and the final plan, involving the shift from a first-person narrator to Dostoevsky's innovative use of third-person narrative to achieve first-person narrative perspectives. Dostoevsky initially considered four first-person plans: a memoir written by Raskolnikov, his confession recorded eight days after the murder, his diary begun five days after the murder, and a mixed form in which the first half was in the form of a memoir, and the second half in the form of a diary. The Wiesbaden edition concentrates entirely on the moral and psychological reactions of the narrator after the murder. It coincides roughly with the story that Dostoevsky described in his letter to Katkov and, written in the form of a diary or journal, corresponds to what eventually became part 2 of the finished work.

I wrote [this chapter] with genuine inspiration, but perhaps it is no good; but for them[,] the question is not its literary worth, they are worried about its morality. Here I was in the right—nothing was against morality, and even quite the contrary, but they saw otherwise and, what's more, saw traces of nihilism ... I took it back, and this revision of a large chapter cost me at least three new chapters of work, judging by the effort and the weariness; but I corrected it and gave it back.

— Dostoevsky's letter to A.P. Milyukov

Why Dostoevsky abandoned his initial version remains a matter of speculation. According to Joseph Frank, "one possibility is that his protagonist began to develop beyond the boundaries in which he had first been conceived". The notebooks indicate that Dostoevsky became aware of the emergence of new aspects of Raskolnikov's character as the plot developed, and he structured the novel in conformity with this "metamorphosis". The final version of Crime and Punishment came into being only when, in November 1865, Dostoevsky decided to recast his novel in the third person. This shift was the culmination of a long struggle, present through all the early stages of composition. Once having decided, Dostoevsky began to rewrite from scratch and was able to easily integrate sections of the early manuscript into the final text. Frank says that he did not, as he told Wrangel, burn everything he had written earlier.

Dostoevsky was under great pressure to finish Crime and Punishment on time, as he was simultaneously contracted to finish The Gambler for the prominent Russian publisher Fyodor Stellovsky, who had imposed extremely harsh conditions. Anna Snitkina, a stenographer who later became Dostoevsky's wife, was of great help to him during this difficult task. The first part of Crime and Punishment appeared in the January 1866 issue of The Russian Messenger, and the last one was published in December 1866.

== Plot ==
=== Part 1 ===
In 1866, Rodion Romanovich Raskolnikov, a former law student, lives in extreme poverty in a tiny rented room in Saint Petersburg. Isolated and antisocial, he has abandoned all attempts to support himself and is brooding obsessively on a scheme he has devised to murder and rob an elderly pawnbroker. On the pretext of pawning a watch, he visits her apartment, but he remains unable to commit himself. Later in a tavern, he makes the acquaintance of Semyon Zakharovich Marmeladov, a drunkard who recently squandered his family's little wealth. Marmeladov tells him about his teenage daughter, Sonya, who has become a prostitute in order to support the family. The next day, Raskolnikov receives a letter from his mother in which she describes the problems of his sister Dunya, who has been working as a governess, with her ill-intentioned employer, Svidrigailov. To escape her vulnerable position, and with hopes of helping her brother, Dunya has chosen to marry a wealthy suitor, Luzhin, whom they are coming to meet in Petersburg. Details in the letter suggest that Luzhin is a conceited opportunist who is seeking to take advantage of Dunya's situation. Raskolnikov is enraged at his sister's sacrifice, feeling it is the same as what Sonya felt compelled to do. Painfully aware of his own poverty and impotence, his thoughts return to his idea. A further series of internal and external events seem to conspire to compel him toward the resolution to enact it.

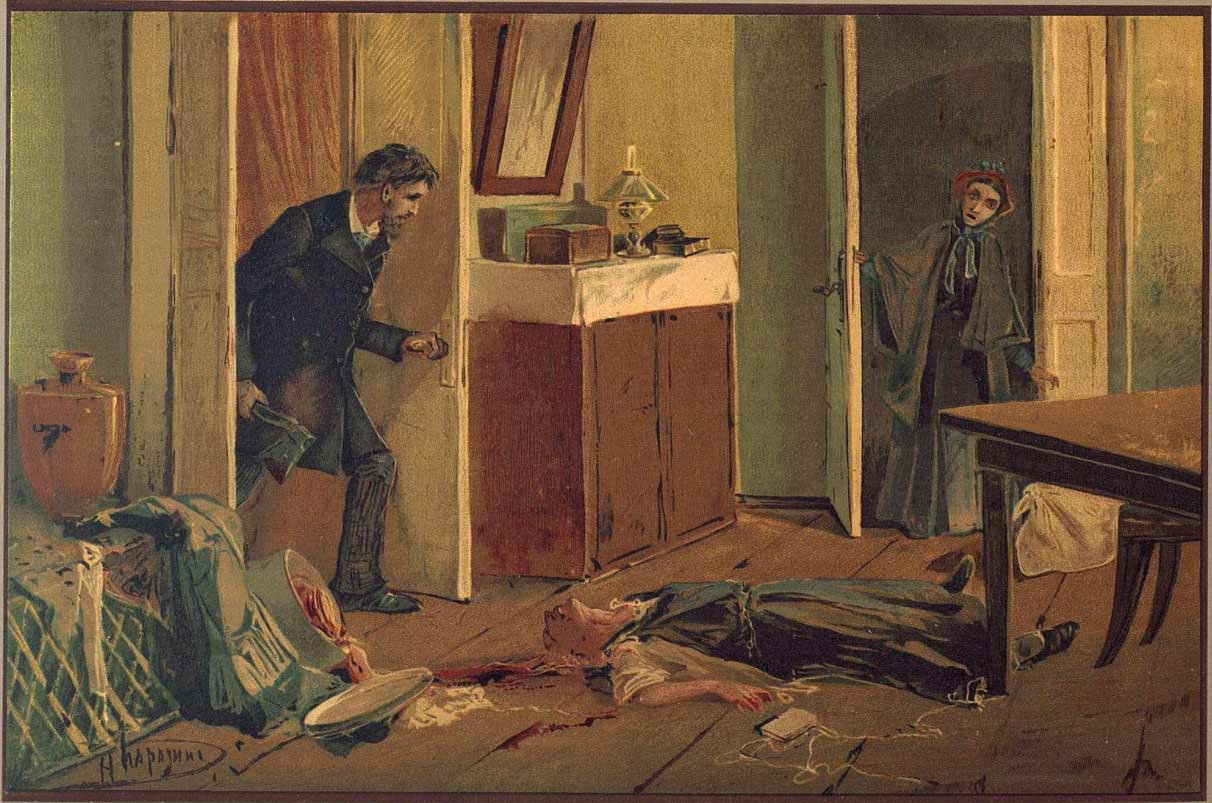
Raskolnikov kills the pawnbroker (illustration by Nikolay Karazin, 1893)

In a state of extreme nervous tension, Raskolnikov steals an axe and makes his way once more to the old woman's apartment. He gains access by pretending he has something to pawn, and then attacks her with the axe, killing her. He also kills her half-sister, Lizaveta, who happens to stumble upon the scene of the crime. Shaken by his actions, he steals only a handful of items and a small purse, leaving much of the pawnbroker's wealth untouched. Due to sheer good fortune, he manages to escape the building and return to his room undetected.

=== Part 2 ===
In a feverish and semi-delirious state, Raskolnikov conceals the stolen items and falls asleep exhausted. He is greatly alarmed the next morning when he gets summoned to the police station, but it turns out to be in relation to a debt notice from his landlady. When the officers at the bureau begin talking about the murder, Raskolnikov faints. He quickly recovers, but he can see from their faces that he has aroused suspicion. Fearing a search, he hides the stolen items under a large rock in an empty yard, noticing in humiliation that he has not even checked how much money is in the purse. Without knowing why, he visits his old university friend Razumikhin, who observes that Raskolnikov seems to be seriously ill. Finally he returns to his room where he succumbs to his illness and falls into a prolonged delirium.

When he emerges several days later he finds that Razumikhin has tracked him down and has been nursing him. Still feverish, Raskolnikov listens nervously to a conversation between Razumikhin and the doctor about the status of the police investigation into the murders: a muzhik called Mikolka, who was working in a neighbouring flat at the time, has been detained, and the old woman's clients are being interviewed. They are interrupted by the arrival of Luzhin, Dunya's fiancé, who wishes to introduce himself, but Raskolnikov deliberately insults him and kicks him out. He angrily tells the others to leave as well, and then sneaks out himself. He looks for news about the murder, and seems almost to want to draw attention to his own part in it. He encounters the police official Zamyotov, who was present when he fainted in the bureau, and openly mocks the young man's unspoken suspicions. He returns to the scene of the crime and re-lives the sensations he experienced at the time. He angers the workmen and caretakers by asking casual questions about the murder, even suggesting that they accompany him to the police station to discuss it. As he contemplates whether to confess, he sees Marmeladov, who has been struck mortally by a carriage. He rushes to help and succeeds in conveying the stricken man back to his family's apartment. Calling out for Sonya to forgive him, Marmeladov dies in his daughter's arms. Raskolnikov gives his last twenty-five rubles (from money sent to him by his mother) to Marmeladov's consumptive widow, Katerina Ivanovna, saying it is the repayment of a debt to his friend.

Feeling renewed, Raskolnikov calls on Razumikhin, and they go back together to Raskolnikov's building. Upon entering his room Raskolnikov is deeply shocked to see his mother and sister sitting on the sofa. They have just arrived in Petersburg and are ecstatic to see him, but Raskolnikov is unable to speak, and collapses in a faint.

=== Part 3 ===
Razumikhin tends to Raskolnikov, and manages to convince the distressed mother and sister to return to their apartment. He goes with them, despite being drunk and rather overwhelmed by Dunya's beauty. When they return the next morning Raskolnikov has improved physically, but it becomes apparent that he is still mentally distracted and merely forcing himself to endure the meeting. He demands that Dunya break with Luzhin, but Dunya fiercely defends her motives for the marriage. Mrs. Raskolnikova has received a note from Luzhin demanding that her son not be present at any future meetings between them. He also informs her that he witnessed her son give the 25 rubles to "an unmarried woman of immoral behavior" (Sonya). Dunya has decided that a meeting, at which both Luzhin and her brother are present, must take place, and Raskolnikov agrees to attend that evening along with Razumikhin. To Raskolnikov's surprise, Sonya suddenly appears at his door. Timidly, she explains that he left his address with them last night, and that she has come to invite him to attend her father's funeral. As she leaves, Raskolnikov asks for her address and tells her that he will visit her soon.

At Raskolnikov's behest, Razumikhin takes him to see the detective Porfiry Petrovich, who is investigating the murders. Raskolnikov immediately senses that Porfiry knows that he is the murderer. Porfiry, who has just been discussing the case with Zamyotov, adopts an ironic tone during the conversation. He expresses extreme curiosity about an article that Raskolnikov wrote some months ago called 'On Crime', in which he suggests that certain rare individuals—the benefactors and geniuses of mankind—have a right to 'step across' legal or moral boundaries if those boundaries are an obstruction to the success of their idea. Raskolnikov defends himself skillfully, but he is alarmed and angered by Porfiry's insinuating tone. An appointment is made for an interview the following morning at the police bureau.

Leaving Razumikhin with his mother and sister, Raskolnikov returns to his own building. He is surprised to find an old artisan, whom he does not know, making inquiries about him. Raskolnikov tries to find out what he wants, but the artisan says only one word – "murderer", and walks off. Petrified, Raskolnikov returns to his room and falls into thought and then sleeps. He wakens from an eerie nightmare about the murder of the old woman to find another complete stranger present, this time a man of aristocratic appearance. The man politely introduces himself as Arkady Ivanovich Svidrigailov.

=== Part 4 ===
Svidrigailov indulges in an amiable but disjointed monologue, punctuated by Raskolnikov's terse interjections. He claims to no longer have any romantic interest in Dunya, but wants to stop her from marrying Luzhin, and offers her ten thousand roubles. Raskolnikov refuses the money on her behalf and refuses to facilitate a meeting. Svidrigailov also mentions that his wife, who defended Dunya at the time of the unpleasantness but died shortly afterwards, has left her 3000 rubles in her will.

The meeting with Luzhin that evening begins with talk of Svidrigailov—his depraved character, his presence in Petersburg, the unexpected death of his wife and the 3000 rubles left to Dunya. Luzhin takes offence when Dunya insists on resolving the issue with her brother, and when Raskolnikov draws attention to the slander in his letter, Luzhin becomes reckless, exposing his true character. Dunya tells him to leave and never come back. Now free and with significant capital, they excitedly begin to discuss plans for the future, but Raskolnikov suddenly gets up and leaves, telling them, to their great consternation, that it might be the last time he sees them. He instructs the baffled Razumikhin to remain and always care for them.

Raskolnikov proceeds to Sonya's place. She is gratified that he is visiting her, but also frightened of his strange manner. He asks a series of merciless questions about her terrible situation and that of Katerina Ivanovna and the children. Raskolnikov begins to realize that Sonya is sustained only by her faith in God. She reveals that she was a friend of the murdered Lizaveta. In fact, Lizaveta gave her a cross and a copy of the Gospels. She passionately reads to him the story of the raising of Lazarus from the Gospel of John. His fascination with her, which had begun at the time when her father spoke of her, increases and he decides that they must face the future together. As he leaves he tells her that he will come back tomorrow and tell her who killed her friend Lizaveta.

When Raskolnikov presents himself for his interview, Porfiry resumes and intensifies his insinuating, provocative, ironic chatter, without ever making a direct accusation. With Raskolnikov's anger reaching fever pitch, Porfiry hints that he has a "little surprise" for him behind the partition in his office, but at that moment there is a commotion outside the door and a young man (Mikolka the painter) bursts in, followed by some policemen. To both Porfiry and Raskolnikov's astonishment, Mikolka proceeds to loudly confess to the murders. Porfiry does not believe the confession, but he is forced to let Raskolnikov go. Back at his room Raskolnikov is horrified when the old artisan suddenly appears at his door. But the man bows and asks for forgiveness: he had been Porfiry's "little surprise", and had heard Mikolka confess. He had been one of those present when Raskolnikov returned to the scene of the murders, and had reported his behavior to Porfiry.

=== Part 5 ===
Raskolnikov attends the Marmeladovs' post-funeral banquet at Katerina Ivanovna's apartment. The atmosphere deteriorates as guests become drunk and the half-mad Katerina Ivanovna engages in a verbal attack on her German landlady. With chaos descending, everyone is surprised by the sudden and portentous appearance of Luzhin. He sternly announces that a 100-ruble banknote disappeared from his apartment at the precise time that he was being visited by Sonya, whom he had invited in order to make a small donation. Sonya fearfully denies stealing the money, but Luzhin persists in his accusation and demands that someone search her. Outraged, Katerina Ivanovna abuses Luzhin and sets about emptying Sonya's pockets to prove her innocence, but a folded 100-ruble note does indeed fly out of one of the pockets. The mood in the room turns against Sonya, Luzhin chastises her, and the landlady orders the family out. But Luzhin's roommate Lebezyatnikov arrives, and angrily asserts that he saw Luzhin surreptitiously slip the money into Sonya's pocket as she left, although he had thought at the time that it was a noble act of anonymous charity. Raskolnikov backs Lebezyatnikov up by confidently identifying Luzhin's motive: a desire to avenge himself on Raskolnikov by defaming Sonya, in hopes of causing a rift with his family. Luzhin is discredited, but Sonya is traumatized, and she runs out of the apartment. Raskolnikov follows her.

Back at her room, Raskolnikov draws Sonya's attention to the ease with which Luzhin could have ruined her, and consequently the children as well. But it is only a prelude to his confession that he is the murderer of the old woman and Lizaveta. Painfully, he tries to explain his abstract motives for the crime to uncomprehending Sonya. She is horrified, not just at the crime, but at his own self-torture, and tells him that he must hand himself in to the police. Lebezyatnikov appears and tells them that the landlady has kicked Katerina Ivanovna out of the apartment and that she has gone mad. They find Katerina Ivanovna surrounded by people in the street, completely insane, trying to force the terrified children to perform for money, and near death from her illness. They manage to get her back to Sonya's room, where, distraught and raving, she dies. To Raskolnikov's surprise, Svidrigailov suddenly appears and informs him that he will be using the ten thousand rubles intended for Dunya to make the funeral arrangements and to place the children in good orphanages. When Raskolnikov asks him what his motives are, he laughingly replies with direct quotations of Raskolnikov's own words, spoken when he was trying to explain his justifications for the murder to Sonya. Svidrigailov has been residing next door to Sonya, and overheard every word of the murder confession.

=== Part 6 ===
Razumikhin tells Raskolnikov that Dunya has become troubled and distant after receiving a letter from someone. He also mentions, to Raskolnikov's astonishment, that Porfiry no longer suspects him of the murders. As Raskolnikov is about to set off in search of Svidrigailov, Porfiry himself appears and politely requests a brief chat. He sincerely apologises for his previous behavior and seeks to explain the reasons behind it. Strangely, Raskolnikov begins to feel alarmed at the thought that Porfiry might think he is innocent. But Porfiry's changed attitude is motivated by genuine respect for Raskolnikov, not by any thought of his innocence, and he concludes by expressing his absolute certainty that Raskolnikov is indeed the murderer. He claims that he will be arresting him soon, but urges him to confess to make it easier on himself. Raskolnikov chooses to continue the struggle.

Raskolnikov finds Svidrigailov at an inn and warns him against approaching Dunya. Svidrigailov, who has in fact arranged to meet Dunya, threatens to go to the police, but Raskolnikov is unconcerned and follows when he leaves. When Raskolnikov finally turns home, Dunya, who has been watching them, approaches Svidrigailov and demands to know what he meant in his letter about her brother's "secret". She reluctantly accompanies him to his rooms, where he reveals what he overheard and attempts to use it to make her yield to his desire. Dunya, however, has a gun and she fires at him, narrowly missing: Svidrigailov gently encourages her to reload and try again. Eventually she throws the gun aside, but Svidrigailov, crushed by her hatred for him, tells her to leave. Later that evening he goes to Sonya to discuss the arrangements for Katerina Ivanovna's children. He gives her 3000 rubles, telling her she will need it if she wishes to follow Raskolnikov to Siberia. He spends the night in a miserable hotel and the following morning commits suicide in a public place.

Raskolnikov says a painful goodbye to his mother, without telling her the truth. Dunya is waiting for him at his room, and he tells her that he will be going to the police to confess to the murders. He stops at Sonya's place on the way and she gives him a crucifix. At the bureau, he learns of Svidrigailov's suicide, and almost changes his mind, even leaving the building. However, he sees Sonya (who has followed him) looking at him in despair, and he returns to make a full and frank confession to the murders.

=== Epilogue ===
Due to the fullness of his confession at a time when another man had already confessed, and his state of mind at the time of the murders, Raskolnikov is sentenced to only eight years of penal servitude. Dunya and Razumikhin marry and plan to move to Siberia, but Raskolnikov's mother falls ill and dies. Sonya follows Raskolnikov to Siberia, but he is initially hostile towards her as he is still struggling to acknowledge moral culpability for his crime, feeling himself to be guilty only of weakness. It is only after some time in prison that his redemption and moral regeneration begin under Sonya's loving influence.

== Characters ==
Character names
Russian and romanization
| First name, nickname | Patronymic | Family name |
|---|---|---|
| Родиóн; Rodión | Ромáнович; Románovich | Раскóльников; Raskól'nikov |
| Авдо́тья, Ду́ня; Avdótya, Dounia | Рома́новна; Románovna | Раско́льникова; Raskól'nikova |
| Пульхери́я; Pulkhería | Алексáндровна; Aleksándrovna | Раско́льникова; Raskól'nikova |
| Семён; Semyón | Заха́рович; Zakhárovich | Мармела́дов; Marmeládov |
| Со́фья, Со́ня, Со́нечка; Sófya, Sónya, Sónechka | Семёновна; Semyónovna | Мармела́дова; Marmeládova |
| Катери́на; Katerína | Ива́новна; Ivánovna | Мармела́дова; Marmeládova |
| Дми́трий; Dmítriy | Проко́фьич; Prokófyich | Вразуми́хин, Разуми́хин; Vrazumíkhin, Razumíkhin |
| Праско́вья; Praskóv'ya | Па́вловна; Pávlovna | Зарницына; Zarnitsyna |
| Арка́дий; Arkádiy | Ива́нович; Ivánovich | Свидрига́йлов; Svidrigáilov |
| Ма́рфа; Márfa | Петро́вна; Petróvna | Свидрига́йлова; Svidrigáilova |
| Пётр; Pyótr | Петро́вич; Petróvich | Лужин; Lúzhyn |
| Андре́й; Andréy | Семёнович; Semyónovich | Лебезя́тников; Lebezyátnikov |
| Порфи́рий; Porfíry | Петро́вич; Petróvich | |
| Лизаве́та; Lizavéta | Ива́новна; Ivánovna | |
| Алёна; Alyóna | Ива́новна; Ivánovna | |
An acute accent marks the stressed syllable.

In Crime and Punishment, Dostoevsky fuses the personality of his main character, Rodion Romanovich Raskolnikov, with his new anti-radical ideological themes. The main plot involves a murder as the result of "ideological intoxication," and depicts all the disastrous moral and psychological consequences that result from the murder. Raskolnikov's psychology is placed at the center, and carefully interwoven with the ideas behind his transgression; every other feature of the novel illuminates the agonizing dilemma in which Raskolnikov is caught. From another point of view, the novel's plot is another variation of a conventional nineteenth-century theme: an innocent young provincial comes to seek his fortune in the capital, where he succumbs to corruption, and loses all traces of his former freshness and purity. However, as Gary Rosenshield points out, "Raskolnikov succumbs not to the temptations of high society as Honoré de Balzac's Rastignac or Stendhal's Julien Sorel, but to those of rationalistic Petersburg".

=== Major characters ===
Raskolnikov (Rodion Romanovitch) is the protagonist, and the novel focuses primarily on his perspective. A 23-year-old former student, now destitute, Raskolnikov is described in the novel as "exceptionally handsome, taller than average in height, slim, well built, with beautiful dark eyes and dark brown hair." On the one hand, he is cold, apathetic, and antisocial; on the other, he can be surprisingly warm and compassionate. He commits murder as well as acts of impulsive charity. His chaotic interaction with the external world and his nihilistic worldview might be seen as causes of his social alienation or consequences of it.

Despite its title, the novel does not so much deal with the crime and its formal punishment as with Raskolnikov's internal struggle – the torments of his own conscience, rather than the legal consequences of committing the crime. Believing society would be better for it, Raskolnikov commits murder with the idea that he possesses enough intellectual and emotional fortitude to deal with the ramifications, but his sense of guilt soon overwhelms him to the point of psychological and somatic illness. It is only in the epilogue that he realizes his formal punishment, having decided to confess and end his alienation from society.

Sonya (Sofya Semyonovna Marmeladova) is the daughter of a drunkard named Semyon Zakharovich Marmeladov, whom Raskolnikov meets in a tavern at the beginning of the novel. She is often characterized as self-sacrificial, shy, and innocent, despite being forced into prostitution to help her family. Raskolnikov discerns in her the same feelings of shame and alienation that he experiences, and she becomes the first person to whom he confesses his crime. Sensing his deep unhappiness, she supports him, even though she was friends with one of the victims (Lizaveta). Throughout the novel, Sonya is an important source of moral strength and rehabilitation for Raskolnikov.

Razumíkhin (Dmitry Prokofyich) is Raskolnikov's loyal friend and also a former law student. The character is intended to represent something of a reconciliation between faith and reason (razum, "sense", "intelligence"). He jokes that his name is actually Vrazumíkhin – a name suggesting "to bring someone to their senses". He is upright, strong, resourceful and intelligent, but also somewhat naïve – qualities that are of great importance to Raskolnikov in his desperate situation. He admires Raskolnikov's intelligence and character, refuses to give any credence to others' suspicions, and supports him at all times. He looks after Raskolnikov's family when they come to Petersburg, falling in love with and later marrying Dunya.

Dunya (Avdotya Romanovna Raskolnikova) – Raskolnikov's beautiful and strong-willed sister who works as a governess. She initially plans to marry the wealthy but unsavory lawyer Luzhin, thinking it will enable her to ease her family's desperate financial situation and escape her former employer Svidrigailov. Her situation is a factor in Raskolnikov's decision to commit the murder. In St. Petersburg, she is eventually able to escape the clutches of both Luzhin and Svidrigailov, and later marries Razumikhin.

Luzhin (Pyotr Petrovich) – A well-off lawyer who is engaged to Dunya in the beginning of the novel. His motives for the marriage are dubious, as he more or less states that he has sought a woman who will be completely beholden to him. He slanders and falsely accuses Sonya of theft in an attempt to harm Raskolnikov's relations with his family. Luzhin represents immorality, in contrast to Svidrigaïlov's amorality, and Raskolnikov's misguided morality.

Svidrigaïlov (Arkady Ivanovich) – Sensual, depraved, and wealthy former employer and former pursuer of Dunya. He overhears Raskolnikov's confessions to Sonya and uses this knowledge to torment both Dunya and Raskolnikov, but does not inform the police. Despite his apparent malevolence, Svidrigaïlov seems to be capable of generosity and compassion. When Dunya tells him she could never love him (after attempting to shoot him) he lets her go. He tells Sonya that he has made financial arrangements for the Marmeladov children to enter an orphanage, and gives her three thousand rubles, enabling her to follow Raskolnikov to Siberia. Having left the rest of his money to his juvenile fiancée, he commits suicide.

Porfiry Petrovich – The head of the Investigation Department in charge of solving the murders of Lizaveta and Alyona Ivanovna, who, along with Sonya, moves Raskolnikov towards confession. Unlike Sonya, however, Porfiry does this through psychological means, seeking to confuse and provoke the volatile Raskolnikov into a voluntary or involuntary confession. He later drops these methods and sincerely urges Raskolnikov to confess for his own good.

=== Other characters ===
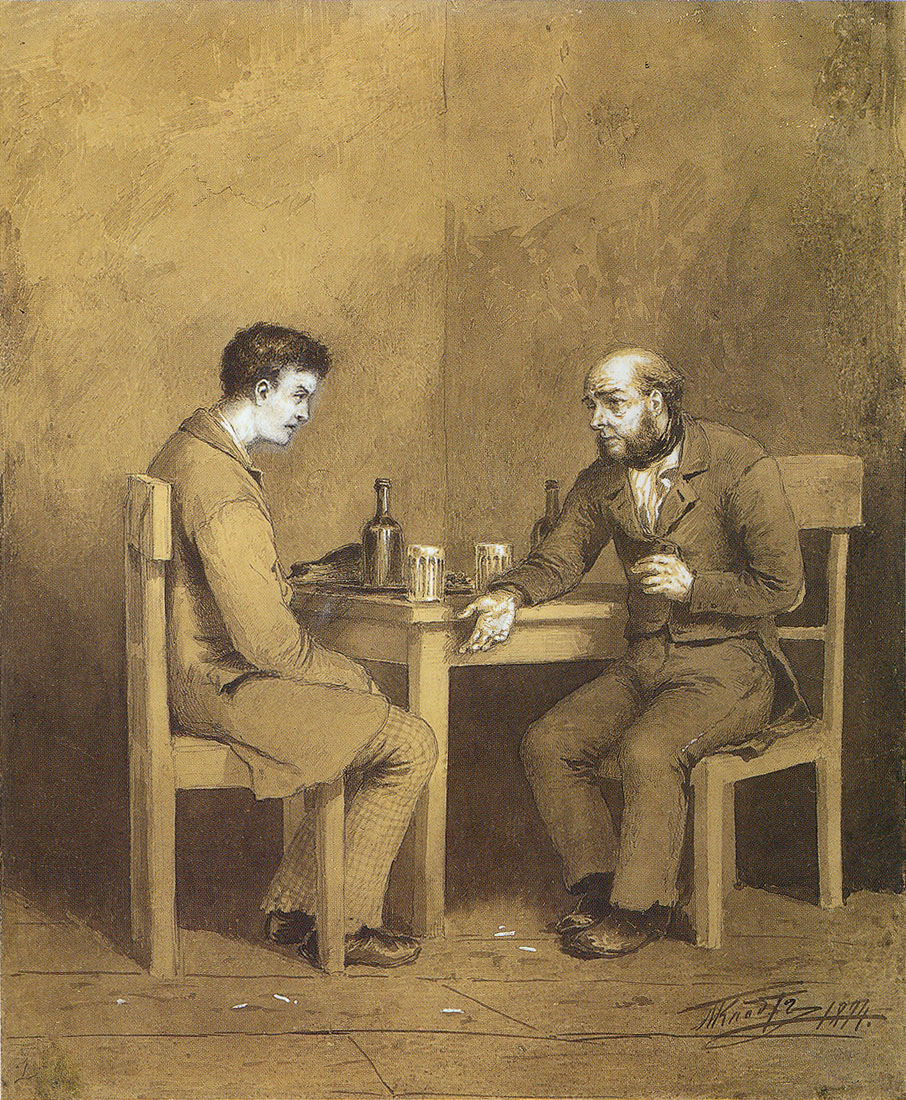
Raskolnikov speaks to Marmeladov (illustration by Michail Petrovich Klodt, 1874)

- Pulkheria Alexandrovna Raskolnikova – Raskolnikov's naïve, hopeful and loving mother. Following Raskolnikov's sentence, she falls ill (mentally and physically) and eventually dies. She hints in her dying stages that she is slightly more aware of her son's fate, which was hidden from her by Dunya and Razumikhin.
- Semyon Zakharovich Marmeladov – Hopeless drunk who Raskolnikov meets while still considering the murder scheme. Raskolnikov is deeply moved by his passionate, almost ecstatic confession of how his abject alcoholism led to the devastation of his life, the destitution of his wife and children, and ultimately to his daughter Sonya being forced into prostitution.
- Katerina Ivanovna Marmeladova – Semyon Marmeladov's consumptive and ill-tempered second wife, stepmother to Sonya. She drives Sonya into prostitution in a fit of rage, but later regrets it. She beats her children, but works ferociously to improve their standard of living. She is obsessed with demonstrating that slum life is far below her station. Following Marmeladov's death, she uses the money Raskolnikov gives her to hold a funeral. She eventually succumbs to her illness.
- Andrey Semyonovich Lebezyatnikov – Luzhin's utopian socialist roommate who witnesses his attempt to frame Sonya and subsequently exposes him. He is proven right by Raskolnikov, the only one knowing of Luzhin's motives.
- Alyona Ivanovna – Suspicious old pawnbroker who hoards money and is merciless to her patrons. She is Raskolnikov's intended target, and he kills her in the beginning of the book.
- Lizaveta Ivanovna – Alyona's handicapped, innocent and submissive sister. Raskolnikov murders her when she walks in immediately after Raskolnikov had killed Alyona. Lizaveta was a friend of Sonya.
- Zosimov (Зосимов) – A friend of Razumikhin and a doctor with a particular interest in 'psychological' illnesses. He ministers to Raskolnikov during his delirium and its aftermath.
- Nastasya Petrovna (Настасья Петровна) – Raskolnikov's landlady's cheerful and talkative servant who is very caring towards Raskolnikov and often brings him food and drink.
- Nikodim Fomich (Никодим Фомич) – The amiable chief of police.
- Ilya Petrovich (Илья Петрович) – A police official and Nikodim Fomich's assistant, nicknamed "Gunpowder" for his very bad temper. He is the first to have suspicions about Raskolnikov in relation to the murder, and Raskolnikov ultimately makes his official confession to Gunpowder.
- Alexander Grigorievich Zamyotov (Александр Григорьевич Заметов) – Head clerk at the police station and friend to Razumikhin.
- Praskovya Pavlovna Zarnitsyna – Raskolnikov's landlady (called Pashenka). Shy and retiring, Praskovya Pavlovna does not figure prominently in the course of events. Raskolnikov had been engaged to her daughter, a sickly girl who had died, and Praskovya Pavlovna had granted him extensive credit on the basis of this engagement and a promissory note for 115 roubles. She had then handed this note to a court councillor named Chebarov, who had claimed the note, causing Raskolnikov to be summoned to the police station the day after his crime.
- Marfa Petrovna Svidrigaïlova – Svidrigaïlov's deceased wife, whom he is suspected of having murdered, and who he claims has visited him as a ghost. In Pulkheria Alexandrovna's letter to her son, Marfa Petrovna is said to have vigorously defended Dunya against Svidrigailov, and introduced her to Luzhin. She leaves Dunya 3000 rubles in her will.
- Nikolai Dementiev (Николай Дементьев), also known as Mikolka – A house painter who happens to be nearby at the time of the murder and is initially suspected of the crime. Driven by memories of the teachings of his Old Believer sect, which holds it to be supremely virtuous to suffer for another person's crime, he falsely confesses to the murders.
- Polina Mikhailovna Marmeladova (Полина Михайловна Мармеладова) – Ten-year-old adopted daughter of Semyon Zakharovich Marmeladov and younger stepsister to Sonya, sometimes known as Polechka and Polya.

=== Characters' names, words behind, meaning in Russian ===
| Name | Word | Meaning in Russian |
|---|---|---|
| Raskolnikov | raskol | a schism, or split; "raskolnik" is "one who splits" or "dissenter"; the verb raskalyvat' means "to cleave", "to chop","to crack","to split" or "to break". The former translations clarify the literal meaning of the word. The figurative meaning of the word is "to bring to light", "to make to confess or acknowledge the truth", etc. The word Raskol is meant to evoke the ideas of the splitting of the Russian Orthodox Church under Patriarch Nikon. |
| Luzhin | luzha | a puddle |
| Razumikhin | razum | rationality, mind, intelligence |
| Zamyotov | zametit | to notice, to realize |
| Lebezyatnikov | lebezit | to fawn on somebody, to cringe |
| Marmeladov | marmelad | marmalade/jam |
| Svidrigaïlov | Svidrigailo | a Lithuanian duke of the fifteenth century (the name given to a character rather by sound, than by meaning) |
| Porfiry | Porphyry | (perhaps) named after the Neoplatonic philosopher or after the Russian "порфира" ("porphyra") meaning "purple, purple mantle" |
| Sonya | Sofya | from the Greek meaning "wisdom" |
| Avdotya (Dunya) | Avdotya | a form of the Greek name Eudoxia/Eudokia/Eudocia, meaning "good fame or judgement" or "she whose fame or judgement is good." The name is derived from εὖ (eu) meaning "good" and δοκέω (dokeo) meaning "to think, to imagine, to suppose". |
| Pulcheria | pulcher | beautiful |
| Nastasya | anastasis | "resurrection" or "rebirth" |

== Themes ==
=== Nihilism, rationalism and utilitarianism ===
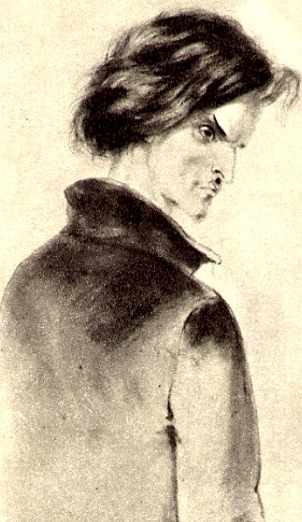
Drawing of Raskolnikov by Pyotr Mikhaylovich Boklevskiy, 1880s

Dostoevsky's letter to Katkov reveals his immediate inspiration, to which he remained faithful even after his original plan evolved into a much more ambitious creation: a desire to counteract what he regarded as nefarious consequences arising from the doctrines of Russian nihilism. In the novel, Dostoevsky pinpointed the dangers of both utilitarianism and rationalism, the main ideas of which inspired the radicals, continuing a fierce criticism he had already started with his Notes from Underground. Dostoevsky utilized the characters, dialogue and narrative in Crime and Punishment to articulate an argument against Westernizing ideas. He thus attacked a peculiar Russian blend of French utopian socialism and Benthamite utilitarianism, which had developed under revolutionary thinkers such as Nikolai Chernyshevsky and became known as rational egoism. The radicals refused to recognize themselves in the novel's pages, since Dostoevsky pursued nihilistic ideas to their most extreme consequences. Dimitri Pisarev ridiculed the notion that Raskolnikov's ideas could be identified with those of the radicals of the time. The radicals' aims were altruistic and humanitarian, but they were to be achieved by relying on reason and suppressing the spontaneous outflow of Christian compassion. Chernyshevsky's utilitarian ethic proposed that thought and will in Man were subject to the laws of physical science. Dostoevsky believed that such ideas limited man to a product of physics, chemistry and biology, negating spontaneous emotional responses. In its latest variety, Russian nihilism encouraged the creation of an élite of superior individuals to whom the hopes of the future were to be entrusted.

Raskolnikov exemplifies the potentially disastrous hazards contained in such an ideal. Contemporary scholar Joseph Frank writes that "the moral-psychological traits of his character incorporate this antinomy between instinctive kindness, sympathy, and pity on the one hand and, on the other, a proud and idealistic egoism that has become perverted into a contemptuous disdain for the submissive herd". Raskolnikov's inner conflict in the opening section of the novel results in a utilitarian-altruistic justification for the proposed crime: why not kill a wretched and "useless" old moneylender to alleviate the human misery? Dostoevsky wants to show that this utilitarian style of reasoning had become widespread and commonplace; it was by no means the solitary invention of Raskolnikov's tormented and disordered mind. Such radical and utilitarian ideas act to reinforce the innate egoism of Raskolnikov's character, and help justify his contempt for humanity's lower qualities and ideals. He even becomes fascinated with the majestic image of a Napoleonic personality who, in the interests of a higher social good, believes that he possesses a moral right to kill. Indeed, his "Napoleon-like" plan impels him toward a well-calculated murder, the ultimate conclusion of his self-deception with utilitarianism.

=== The environment of Saint Petersburg ===
Dostoevsky was among the first to recognize the symbolic possibilities of city life and imagery drawn from the city. I. F. I. Evnin regards Crime and Punishment as the first great Russian novel "in which the climactic moments of the action are played out in dirty taverns, on the street, in the sordid back rooms of the poor".

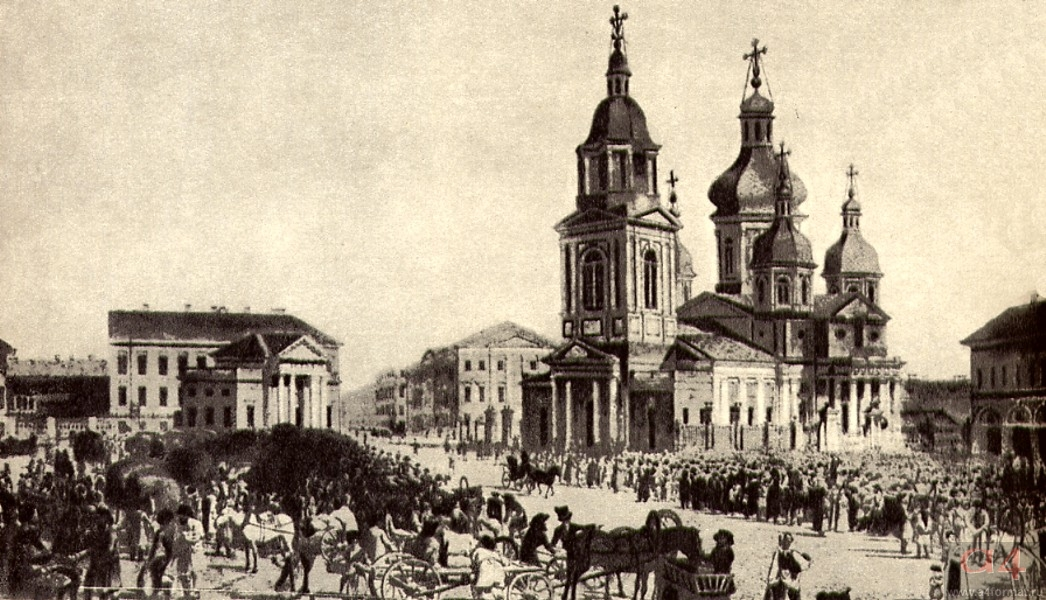
Sennaya Square, where critical scenes in the novel take place

Dostoevsky's Petersburg is the city of unrelieved poverty; "magnificence has no place in it, because magnificence is external, formal, abstract, cold". Dostoevsky connects the city's problems to Raskolnikov's thoughts and subsequent actions. The crowded streets and squares, the shabby houses and taverns, the noise and stench, all are transformed by Dostoevsky into a rich store of metaphors for states of mind. Donald Fanger asserts that "the real city ... rendered with a striking concreteness, is also a city of the mind in the way that its atmosphere answers Raskolnikov's state and almost symbolizes it. It is crowded, stifling, and parched."

In his depiction of Petersburg, Dostoevsky accentuates the squalor and human wretchedness that pass before Raskolnikov's eyes. He uses Raskolnikov's encounter with Marmeladov to contrast the heartlessness of Raskolnikov's convictions with a Christian approach to poverty and wretchedness. Dostoevsky believes that the moral "freedom" propounded by Raskolnikov is a dreadful freedom "that is contained by no values, because it is before values". In seeking to affirm this "freedom" in himself, Raskolnikov is in perpetual revolt against society, himself, and God. He thinks that he is self-sufficient and self-contained, but at the end "his boundless self-confidence must disappear in the face of what is greater than himself, and his self-fabricated justification must humble itself before the higher justice of God". Dostoevsky calls for the regeneration and renewal of "sick" Russian society through the re-discovery of its national identity, its religion, and its roots.

== Structure ==
The novel is divided into six parts, with an epilogue. The notion of "intrinsic duality" in Crime and Punishment has been commented upon, with the suggestion that there is a degree of symmetry to the book. Edward Wasiolek, who has argued that Dostoevsky was a skilled craftsman, highly conscious of the formal pattern in his art, has likened the structure of Crime and Punishment to a "flattened X", saying:

Parts I–III [of Crime and Punishment] present the predominantly rational and proud Raskolnikov: Parts IV–VI, the emerging "irrational" and humble Raskolnikov. The first half of the novel shows the progressive death of the first ruling principle of his character; the last half, the progressive birth of the new ruling principle. The point of change comes in the very middle of the novel.

This compositional balance is achieved by means of the symmetrical distribution of certain key episodes throughout the novel's six parts. The recurrence of these episodes in the two halves of the novel, as David Bethea has argued, is organized according to a mirror-like principle, whereby the "left" half of the novel reflects the "right" half.

The seventh part of the novel, the Epilogue, has attracted much attention and controversy. Some of Dostoevsky's critics have criticized the novel's final pages as superfluous, anticlimactic, unworthy of the rest of the work, while others have defended it, offering various schemes that they claim prove its inevitability and necessity. Steven Cassedy argues that Crime and Punishment "is formally two distinct but closely related, things, namely a particular type of tragedy in the classical Greek mold and a Christian resurrection tale". Cassedy concludes that "the logical demands of the tragic model as such are satisfied without the Epilogue in Crime and Punishment ... At the same time, this tragedy contains a Christian component, and the logical demands of this element are met only by the resurrection promised in the Epilogue".

== Style ==
Crime and Punishment is written from a third-person omniscient perspective, often utilizing stream of consciousness. It is told primarily from the point of view of Raskolnikov, but does at times switch to the perspective of other characters such as Svidrigaïlov, Razumikhin, Luzhin, Sonya or Dunya. This narrative technique, which fuses the narrator very closely with the consciousness and point of view of the central characters, was original for its period. Frank notes that Dostoevsky's use of time shifts of memory and manipulation of temporal sequence begins to approach the later experiments of Henry James, Joseph Conrad, Virginia Woolf, and James Joyce. A late nineteenth-century reader was, however, accustomed to more orderly and linear types of expository narration. This led to the persistence of the legend that Dostoevsky was an untidy and negligent craftsman, and to observations like the following by Melchior de Vogüé: "A word ... one does not even notice, a small fact that takes up only a line, have their reverberations fifty pages later ... [so that] the continuity becomes unintelligible if one skips a couple of pages".

Dostoevsky uses different speech mannerisms and sentences of different length for different characters. Those who use artificial language—Luzhin, for example—are identified as unattractive people. Mrs. Marmeladov's disintegrating mind is reflected in her language. In the original Russian text, the names of the major characters have something of a double meaning, but in translation the subtlety of the Russian language is predominantly lost due to differences in language structure and culture. For example, the original Russian title ("Преступление и наказание") is not the direct equivalent to the English "Crime and Punishment". "Преступление" (Prestupléniye) is literally translated as 'a stepping across'. The physical image of crime as crossing over a barrier or a boundary is lost in translation, as is the religious implication of transgression.

== Reception ==
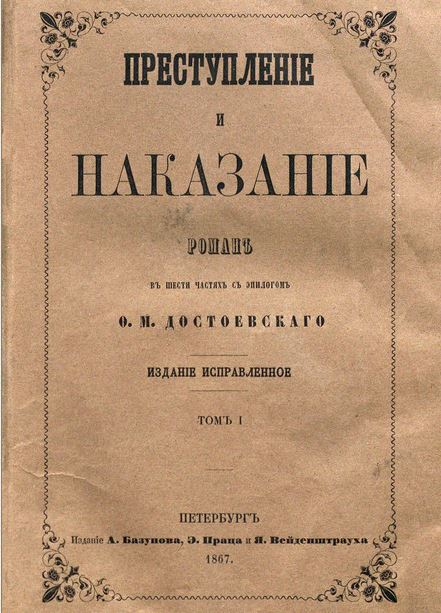
Cover of the first edition of Crime and Punishment, 1867

The first part of Crime and Punishment published in the January and February issues of The Russian Messenger met with public success. In his memoirs, the conservative belletrist Nikolay Strakhov recalled that Crime and Punishment was the literary sensation of 1866 in Russia. Tolstoy's novel War and Peace was being serialized in The Russian Messenger at the same time as Crime and Punishment.

The novel soon attracted the criticism of the liberal and radical critics. G.Z. Yeliseyev sprang to the defense of the Russian student corporations, and wondered, "Has there ever been a case of a student committing murder for the sake of robbery?" Pisarev, aware of the novel's artistic value, described Raskolnikov as a product of his environment, and argued that the main theme of the work was poverty and its results. He measured the novel's excellence by the accuracy with which Dostoevsky portrayed the contemporary social reality, and focused on what he regarded as inconsistencies in the novel's plot. Strakhov rejected Pisarev's contention that the theme of environmental determinism was essential to the novel, and pointed out that Dostoevsky's attitude towards his hero was sympathetic: "This is not mockery of the younger generation, neither a reproach nor an accusation—it is a lament over it." Solovyov felt that the meaning of the novel, despite the common failure to understand it, is clear and simple: a man who considers himself entitled to 'step across' discovers that what he thought was an intellectually and even morally justifiable transgression of an arbitrary law turns out to be, for his conscience, "a sin, a violation of inner moral justice... that inward sin of self-idolatry can only be redeemed by an inner act of self-renunciation."

The early Symbolist movement that dominated Russian letters in the 1880s was concerned more with aesthetics than the visceral realism and intellectuality of Crime and Punishment, but a tendency toward mysticism among the new generation of symbolists in the 1900s led to a reevaluation of the novel as an address to the dialectic of spirit and matter. In the character of Sonya (Sofya Semyonovna) they saw an embodiment of both the Orthodox feminine principle of hagia sophia (holy wisdom) – "at once sexual and innocent, redemptive both in her suffering and her veneration of suffering", and the most important feminine deity of Russian folklore mat syra zemlya (moist mother earth). Raskolnikov is a "son of Earth" whose egoistic aspirations lead him to ideas and actions that alienate him from the very source of his strength, and he must bow down to her before she can relieve him of the terrible burden of his guilt. Philosopher and Orthodox theologian Nikolay Berdyaev shared Solovyov and the symbolists' sense of the novel's spiritual significance, seeing it as an illustration of the modern age's hubristic self-deification, or what he calls "the suicide of man by self-affirmation". Raskolnikov answers his question of whether he has the right to kill solely by reference to his own arbitrary will, but, according to Berdyaev, these are questions that can only be answered by God, and "he who does not bow before that higher will destroys his neighbor and destroys himself: that is the meaning of Crime and Punishment".

Crime and Punishment was regarded as an important work in a number of 20th-century European cultural movements, notably the Bloomsbury Group, psychoanalysis, and existentialism. Of the writers associated with Bloomsbury, Virginia Woolf, John Middleton Murry and D. H. Lawrence are some of those who have discussed the work. Freud held Dostoevsky's work in high esteem, and many of his followers have attempted psychoanalytical interpretations of Raskolnikov. Among the existentialists, Sartre and Camus in particular have acknowledged Dostoevsky's influence.

The affinity of Crime and Punishment with both religious mysticism and psychoanalysis led to suppression of discussion in Soviet Russia: interpretations of Raskolnikov tended to align with Pisarev's idea of reaction to unjust socio-economic conditions. An exception was the work of Mikhail Bakhtin, considered by many commentators to be the most original and insightful analyst of Dostoevsky's work. In Problems of Dostoevsky's Poetics, Bakhtin argues that attempts to understand Dostoevsky's characters from the vantage point of a pre-existing philosophy, or as individualized "objects" to be psychologically analysed, will always fail to penetrate the unique "artistic architechtonics" of his works. In such cases, both the critical approach and the assumed object of investigation are monological: everything is perceived as occurring within the framework of a single overarching perspective, whether that of the critic or that of the author. Dostoevsky's art, Bakhtin argues, is inherently dialogical: events proceed on the basis of interaction between self-validating subjective voices, often within the consciousness of an individual character, as is the case with Raskolnikov. Raskolnikov's consciousness is depicted as a battleground for all the conflicting ideas that find expression in the novel: everyone and everything he encounters becomes reflected and refracted in a "dialogized" interior monologue. He has rejected external relationships and chosen his tormenting internal dialogue; only Sonya is capable of continuing to engage with him despite his cruelty. His openness to dialogue with Sonya is what enables him to cross back over the "threshold into real-life communication (confession and public trial)—not out of guilt, for he avoids acknowledging his guilt, but out of weariness and loneliness, for that reconciling step is the only relief possible from the cacophony of unfinalized inner dialogue."

== English translations ==
1. Frederick Whishaw (1885)
2. Constance Garnett (1914)
3. David Magarshack (1951)
4. Princess Alexandra Kropotkin (1953)
5. Jessie Coulson (1953)
6. Michael Scammell (1963)
7. Sidney Monas (1968)
8. Julius Katzer (1985)
9. David McDuff (1991)
10. Richard Pevear and Larissa Volokhonsky (1992)
11. Oliver Ready (2014)
12. Nicolas Pasternak Slater (2017)
13. Michael R. Katz (2017)
14. Roger Cockrell (2022)

== Adaptations ==
=== Film ===
There have been over 30 film adaptations of Crime and Punishment. They include:

- Raskolnikow (aka Crime and Punishment) (1923) directed by Robert Wiene
- Crime and Punishment (1935 French film) directed by Pierre Chenal, starring Harry Baur and Pierre Blanchar
- Crime and Punishment (1935 American film) starring Peter Lorre as Raskolnikov, Edward Arnold as Porfiry and Marian Marsh
- Crime and Punishment (1956 film) directed by Georges Lampin, starring Jean Gabin and Robert Hossein
- Crime and Punishment (1970 Soviet film) in 2 parts directed by Lev Kulidzhanov, starring Georgi Taratorkin, Tatyana Bedova, Vladimir Basov, Victoria Fyodorova
- Crime and Punishment (1983 film) (original title, Rikos ja Rangaistus), the first movie by the Finnish director Aki Kaurismäki, with Markku Toikka in the lead role. The story has been transplanted to modern-day Helsinki, Finland
- Without Compassion (1994), directed by Francisco Lombardi, starring Diego Bertie and Adriana Dávila Franke
- Crime and Punishment in Suburbia (2000), an adaptation set in modern America and "loosely based" on the novel
- Crime and Punishment (2002 Russian film), starring Crispin Glover, Vanessa Redgrave and John Hurt as Porfiry

=== Radio ===
- "Crime and Punishment" (September 25, 1947), an episode of the NBC old-time radio series Mystery in the Air, starring Peter Lorre as Raskolnikov
- Crime and Punishment (1947), an Australian radio play based on the novel, adapted by Richard Lane with Peter Finch as Raskolnikov
- Crime and Punishment (2000), a BBC radio serial in 3 parts, dramatized by Mike Walker, with Barnaby Kay as Raskolnikov, Poppy Miller as Sonia and Jim Norton as Porfiry

=== Comics ===
- Crime and Punishment (1953), by Osamu Tezuka
- Crime and Punishment: A Falsified Romance (2007), by Naoyuki Ochiai, adapted into a live-action series in 2012
- Crime et Châtiment (2019), by Bastien Loukia

=== Television ===
- Crime and Punishment (1979 TV series), a three-part BBC television serial, starring John Hurt as Raskolnikov and Timothy West as Porfiry Petrovich
- Crime and Punishment (2002 TV series), a BBC television serial, with John Simm as Raskolnikov and Ian McDiarmid as Porfiry Petrovich
- Crime and Punishment (2007 TV series), a television serial directed by Dmitry Svetozarov, starring Vladimir Koshevoy as Raskolnikov, which aired on Channel One Russia
- Crime and Punishment (2024 TV series), a 2024 television serial directed by Vladimir Mirzoyev, starring Ivan Yankovsky as Raskolnikov, which aired on streaming service Kinopoisk

=== Theatre ===
- Crime and Punishment (2007), a play by Marilyn Campbell and Curt Columbus

== Sources ==
- Dostoevsky, Fyodor (1866). Crime and Punishment. Translated in English by Constance Garnett.
- Bakhtin, Mikhail (1984). Problems of Dostoevsky's Poetics. Translated by Emerson, Caryl. University of Minnesota Press. ISBN 9780816612284.
- Bourgeois, Patrick Lyall (1996). "Dostoevsky and Existentialism: An Experiment in Hermeunetics". In Mc Bride, William Leon (ed.). Existentialist Background. Taylor & Francis. ISBN 0-8153-2492-8.
- Cassedy, Steven (1982). "The Formal Problem of the Epilogue in Crime and Punishment: The Logic of Tragic and Christian Structures". Dostoevsky Centenary Conference at the University of Nottingham. Vol. 3. International Dostoevsky Society. Archived from the original on 2 October 2013.
- Church, Margaret (1983). "Dostoevsky's Crime and Punishment and Kafka's The Trial". Structure and Theme – Don Quixote to James Joyce. Ohio State University Press. ISBN 0-8142-0348-5.
- Cox, Gary (1990). Crime and Punishment: A Mind to Murder. Boston: Twayne.
- Davydov, Sergei (1982). "Dostoevsky and Nabokov: The Morality of Structure in Crime and Punishment and Despair". Dostoevsky Centenary Conference at the University of Nottingham. Vol. 3. International Dostoevsky Society. Archived from the original on 20 June 2014.
- Fanger, Donald (2006). "Apogee: Crime and Punishment". In Peace, Richard Arthur (ed.). Fyodor Dostoevsky's Crime and Punishment: A Casebook. Oxford University Press. ISBN 0-19-517562-X.
- Frank, Joseph (1994). "The Making of Crime and Punishment". In Polhemus, Robert M.; Henkle, Roger B. (eds.). Critical Reconstructions: The Relationship of Fiction and Life. Stanford University Press. ISBN 0-8047-2243-9.
- Frank, Joseph (1995). Dostoevsky: The Miraculous Years, 1865–1871. Princeton University Press. ISBN 0-691-01587-2. "Katkov, Crime and Punishment."
- Frank, Joseph (2002). Dostoevsky: The Mantle of the Prophet, 1871–1881. Princeton University Press. Introduction. ISBN 0-691-11569-9.
- Gill, Richard (1982). "The Bridges of St. Petersburg: a Motive in Crime and Punishment". Dostoevsky Centenary Conference at the University of Nottingham. Vol. 3. International Dostoevsky Society - University of Toronto. Archived from the original on 19 September 2008.
- Hardy, James D. Jr.; Stanton, Leonard J. (1999). "Introduction". Crime and Punishment by Fyodor Dostoyevsky. Signet Classic. ISBN 0-451-52723-2.
- Hudspith, Sarah (2003). Dostoevsky and the Idea of Russianness. Routledge. ISBN 9780415304894.
- Lindenmeyr, Adele (2006). "Raskolnikov's City and the Napoleonic Plan". In Peace, Richard Arthur (ed.). Fyodor Dostoevsky's Crime and Punishment: A Casebook. Oxford University Press. ISBN 0-19-517562-X.
- McDuff, David (2002). "Introduction". Fyodor M. Dostoevsky's Crime and Punishment. Penguin Classics. ISBN 0-14-044913-2.
- Meier, Nils (2025). Dostoevskijs Studien zum autoritären Charakter: Der Roman Prestuplenie i nakazanie im Kontext der Kritischen Theorie. Ost-West-Express. Kultur und Übersetzung. Vol. 51. Frank & Timme. doi:10.57088/978-3-7329-8776-4. ISBN 978-3-7329-8776-4.
- Miller, Robin Feuer (2007). "Crime and Punishment in the Classroom". Dostoevsky's Unfinished Journey. Yale University Press. ISBN 9780300120158.
- Morris, Virginia B. (1984). "Style". Fyodor M. Dostoevsky's Crime and Punishment. Barron's Educational Series. ISBN 0-8120-3409-0.
- Ozick, Cynthia (16 February 1997). "Dostoyevsky's Unabomber". The New Yorker. p. 114.
- Peace, Richard Arthur, ed. (2006). Fyodor Dostoevsky's Crime and Punishment: A Casebook. Oxford University Press. ISBN 0-19-517562-X.:
  - Peace, Richard. "Introduction", 1–16.
  - Fanger, Donald. "Apogee: Crime and Punishment", 17–35.
  - Lindenmeyr, Adele. "Raskolnikov's City and the Napoleonic Plan", 37–49.
  - Wasiolek, Edward. "Raskolnikov's City and the Napoleonic Plan", 51–74.
  - Peace, Richard. "Motive and Symbol", 75–101.
- Rosenshield, Gary (Winter 1973). "First- Versus Third-Person Narration in Crime and Punishment". The Slavic and East European Journal. 17 (4): 399–407. doi:10.2307/305635. JSTOR 305635.
- Rosenshield, Gary (1978). Crime and Punishment: The Techniques of the Omniscient Author. Peter de Ridder Press. ISBN 90-316-0104-7.
- Sergeyev, Victor M. (1998). The Wild East: Crime and Lawlessness in Post-communist Russia. M.E. Sharpe. ISBN 0-7656-0231-8.
- Simmons, Ernest J. (2007). "In the Author's Laboratory". Dostoevsky – The Making of a Novelist. Read Books. ISBN 978-1-4067-6362-1.
- Wasiolek, Edward (2006). "Raskolnikov's City and the Napoleonic Plan". In Peace, Richard Arthur (ed.). Fyodor Dostoevsky's Crime and Punishment: A Casebook. Oxford University Press. ISBN 0-19-517562-X.
- Wellek, René (1980). "Bakhtin's view of Dostoevsky: 'Polyphony' and 'Carnivalesque'". Dostoevsky Studies – Form and Structure. Vol. 1. International Dostoevsky Society - University of Toronto. Archived from the original on 2 October 2013.
