= Eudoxius (given name) =

Eudoxius (Latin) or Eudoxios (Ancient Greek: Εὐδοξίος) is a male given name, equivalent to the female name Eudoxia.

It may refer to:

- St. Eudoxius of Armenia, 2nd-century Roman soldier and Christian martyr from the time of Emperor Trajan
- Holy Martyrs Eudoxius, Zeno, Macarius, and Companions (martyred 311–312); relevant here: St. Eudoxius of Melitene
- St. Eudoxius of Sebaste, Christian martyr from the time of Emperor Licinius, martyred in 315 at Sebaste together with other Roman Christian soldiers - see Agapius, Atticus, Carterius, Styriacus, Tobias, Eudoxius, Nictopolion, and Companions
- Eudoxius of Antioch (died 370), Arian bishop of Antioch and later of Constantinople
- Eudoxius, consul of Rome in AD 442
- Eudoxius (jurist), professor and one of the 5th-century "Ecumenical Masters" at the Law school of Berytus

== See also ==
- Eudoxus
- Eudoxia
- Eudocia
