= Eudocias (Pamphylia) =

Ancient town in Pamphylia

Coordinates: 36°59′18″N 30°34′48″E

Eudocias (Ancient Greek: Εὐδοκιάς) or Eudocia (Ancient Greek: Εὐδοκία) was an ancient town in the Roman province of Pamphylia Secunda, in the neighbourhood of Termessus.

According to William Smith's Dictionary of Greek and Roman Geography (1854), the Synecdemus of Hierocles mentions four towns in Asia Minor, including one in Pamphylia, called Eudocia (Εὐδοκία), but other scholars report the Synecdemus as calling the Pamphylian town Eudocias. Le Quien says the Synecdemus spoke of the Pamphylian town as Eudoxias but himself, in line with other sources, uses the form "Eudocias". Parthey's 1866 edition of the Synecdemus gives the name of the Pamphylian town as Eudocia, but notes that the earlier editions of Wesseling (1735) and Bekker (1840) gave the name as Eudocias.

In recent studies, "Eudocias" is the form of the name given by George E. Bean, and by Hülya Yalçınsoy and Süleyman Atalay.

The original name of the town seems to have been Anydros. It was rebuilt in the 5th century and renamed Eudocias in honour of Empress Aelia Eudocia, the wife of Theodosius II, and under this name is mentioned in the Synecdemus. Bishop Timotheus of Termessus and Eudocias took part in the Council of Ephesus in 431 and Bishop Sabinianus of Termessus, Eudocias and Iobia in a synod held in Constantinople in 448. But in 458, the suffragans of the metropolitan see of Perge (the capital of Pamphylia Secunda) who signed a joint letter to the Byzantine Emperor regarding the murder of Proterius of Alexandria included both Auxentius of Termessus and Innocentius of Eudocias, showing that Eudocias had by then become a distinct episcopal see. From then on Eudocias and Termessus appear as separate sees in the Notitiae Episcopatuum even as late as the 10th century.

Other sources too give the names of these bishops of Eudocias, adding to them Callistus (or Calixtus), who took part in the Second Council of Nicaea in 787.

No longer a residential bishopric, Eudocias is today listed by the Catholic Church as a titular see.

Its site is tentatively located near Evdirhan in Asiatic Turkey.

== See also ==
For information on a town with a similar or identical name in the Roman province of Lycia, see Eudocia (Lycia).
