= Appius Claudius =

Appius Claudius may refer to:

- Appius Claudius Caecus
- Appius Claudius Caudex
- Appius Claudius Crassus Inregillensis Sabinus
- Appius Claudius Pulcher (disambiguation)
- Appius Claudius Sabinus Inregillensis
