= Claudius Pulcher =

Claudius Pulcher may refer to:

- Appius Claudius Pulcher (disambiguation), Romans
- Gaius Claudius Pulcher (disambiguation), Romans
- Publius Claudius Pulcher (disambiguation), Romans

== See also ==
- Claudii Pulchri
