= Eudocia (Phrygia) =

Ancient town in Phrygia Pacatiana

Eudocia (Ancient Greek: Εὐδοκία), or possibly Eudocias (Ancient Greek: Εὐδοκιάς), was an ancient town in Phrygia Pacatiana. Its current location is unknown.

The Synecdemus of Hierocles mentions four towns in Asia Minor called Eudocia, including one in Phrygia Pacatiana.
