= Crime et Châtiment =

Crime et châtiment may refer to:

- Crime and Punishment (1935 French film)
- Crime and Punishment (1956 film)
- Crime et Châtiment (comic book), a 2019 comic book by Bastien Loukia
