= Eudocia (Cappadocia) =

Ancient city in Turkey

Although William Smith's Dictionary of Greek and Roman Geography (1854) said that the Synecdemus of Hierocles mentions four towns in Asia Minor called Eudocia (Ancient Greek: Εὐδοκία), including one in Cappadocia, the text of the Synecdemus as edited by Gustav Parthey in 1866 mentions no town of that name or of any similar name among the Cappadocian towns.

Smith also said that the town had formerly belonged to the Anatolian Theme but Leo VI incorporated it into Cappadocia. The Synecdemus was composed, under Justinian (527–565), before 535, three and a half centuries before the time of Leo VI, who reigned from 886 to 912.
