= Orni =

Town of ancient Thrace

Coordinates: 40°54′52″N 27°16′49″E

Orni or Ornoi (Ancient Greek: Ὄρνοι) was a town of ancient Thrace mentioned by Hierocles. It was inhabited from Classical through Byzantine times. It may also have borne the name Bornos or Ornos.

Its site is tentatively located south of İnecik in European Turkey.
