= Pulcher =

Pulcher is Latin for "beautiful", and may refer to:

- Claudius Pulcher (disambiguation), Romans
- Publius Clodius Pulcher, Roman politician and street agitator
- Pelvicachromis pulcher

== See also ==
- Pulchella
