= Evdokiya =

Evdokiya (Russian: Евдокия, Bulgarian: Евдокия) is a Russian and Bulgarian variant of the Greek Eudokia (Ευδοκία), a feminine given name. It may refer to:

- Evdokiya Rostopchina, Russian poet
- Evdokiya Germanova, Russian actress.
- Evdokiya Maneva, Bulgarian politician
- Evdokiya Popadinova, Bulgarian female footballer
- 2130 Evdokiya, minor planet

== See also ==
- Eudoxia (name) - covers all people, places, ships etc. named either Eudokia or derived variants of the name
- Evdokija - Serbian variant
