= Evdokija =

Evdokija, Jevdokija
- Gender: Female
- Language: Serbian

Origin
- Origin: Eudoxia (Greek)

Evdokija (Serbian Cyrillic: Евдокија, Macedonian: Евдокија) and Jevdokija (Јевдокија) are Serbian and Macedonian variants of Greek name Eudokia (Ευδοκία), a feminine given name. It may refer to:

- Teodora-Evdokija (1330–after 1381), daughter of Stefan Dečanski, wife of Dejan
- Jevdokija Balšić (fl. 1411), daughter of Đurađ I Balšić, wife of Esau de' Buondelmonti
- Eudokia Angelina or Evdokija Anđel (fl. 1186–1211), daughter of Alexios III Angelos, wife of Stefan the First-Crowned
- Evdokija Foteva - Vera (1926 - 2011), a Macedonian communist from Aegean Macedonia.

== See also ==
- Eudoxia (name) - covers all people, places, ships etc. named either Eudokia or derived variants of the name, including Evdokija
- Evdokiya, Bulgarian variant
