= Publius Claudius Pulcher =

Publius Claudius Pulcher may refer to:

- Publius Claudius Pulcher (consul 249 BC), Roman senator
- Publius Claudius Pulcher (consul 184 BC), Roman senator
- Publius Claudius Pulcher (son of Clodius), Roman senator
- Publius Clodius Pulcher, Roman senator and street agitator

== See also ==
- Claudius Pulcher (disambiguation)
