= Avdotya =

Avdotya (Russian: Авдо́тья) or Avdotia is a Russian feminine given name. It is a form of the Greek name Eudoxia/Eudokia/Eudocia, held by several saints venerated in the Eastern Orthodox Church.

== People ==
- Avdotya Chernysheva (1693–1747), Russian noble and lady in waiting
- Avdotia Istomina (Avdotya Istomina) (1799–1848), Russian ballerina
- Avdotya Mikhaylova (1746–1807), Russian stage actress and opera singer
- Avdotya Panaeva (1820–1893), Russian writer
- Avdotya Romanovna Raskolnikova, character in Fyodor Dostoyevsky's novel Crime and Punishment
- Avdotya Timofeyeva (b. 1739), Russian ballerina

== See also ==
- Eudoxia (name) - covers all people, places, ships etc. named either Eudoxia or derived variants of the name
