= Eudocia (Lycia) =

Town in ancient Lycia

Eudocia (Ancient Greek: Εὐδοκία) was a town in ancient Lycia.

Although William Smith's Dictionary of Greek and Roman Geography (1854) said that the Synecdemus of Hierocles mentions four towns in Asia Minor called Eudocia (Εὐδοκία), including one in Lycia, other scholars report the Synecdemus as calling one or more of them Eudocias or Eudoxias. and the name of the Lycian town as it appears in the text of the Synecdemus as edited by Parthey in 1866 is clearly Eudocias (Εὐδοκιάς), while noting that in some Notitiae Episcopatuum the name is given as Eudoxias (Εὐδοξιάς).

Le Quien, who mentions no town in Lycia called Eudocia, says that the Synecdemus called a town in Lycia Eudocias and one in Pamphylia Eudoxias, but that other sources speak of the Pamphylian town also as Eudocias. He sees in the presence in the Synecdemus both of a Lycian Telmessus and a Lycian Eudocias and also of a Pamphylian Termessus and a Pamphylian Eudoxias or Eudocias proof that they were all distinct cities. It is curious then that, although, when speaking of Telmessus, he says that it was the Pamphylian Termessus and the Pamphylian Eudocias that for long had the same bishop, when he speaks of the Lycian Eudocias, he attributes to that see the same bishops that he attributes elsewhere to the Pamphylian Eudocias, calling the two most ancient one either bishops of Telmessus and Eudocias (when speaking of Lycia) or bishops of Termessus and Eudocias (when speaking of Pamphylia). The bishops that he mentions for both towns that he calls Eudocias are Timotheus (at the 431 Council of Ephesus), Zenodotus (at the 451 Council of Ephesus), and Photius or Photinus (at the 787 Second Council of Nicaea).

The more recent study by Gams makes no mention of any bishopric in Lycia called either Eudocias or Eudocia, but mentions both the Lycian Telmessus and the Pamphylian Termessus and Eudocias.

The Annuario Pontificio speaks of a no longer residential, and therefore now titular, episcopal see in the Roman province of Lycia as called Eudocia. It was a suffragan of Myra, the metropolitan see and capital of that province. The Annuario Pontificio states that the town that it calls Eudocia was near Makri, the name that at least by the 9th century was given to the city previously called Telmessus, which is now Fethiye, Muğla Province, Turkey.
