= Gaius Claudius Pulcher =

Gaius Claudius Pulcher may refer to:

- Gaius Claudius Pulcher (consul 177 BC), consul in 177 BC
- Gaius Claudius Pulcher (consul 130 BC), consul in 130 BC
- Gaius Claudius Pulcher (consul 92 BC), consul in 92 BC
