= Eudoxus =

Eudoxus may refer to:

- Eudoxus of Cnidus (c. 395–390 BC – c. 342–337 BC), Greek astronomer and mathematician, student of Plato
- Eudoxus of Cyzicus (fl. c. 130 BC), Greek navigator who explored the Arabian Sea for Ptolemy VIII of Egypt
- Eudoxus (lunar crater)
- Eudoxus (Martian crater)

== See also ==
- 11709 Eudoxos, asteroid
- Eudoxia (name)
- Charaxes eudoxus, an African butterfly
