= Crime et Châtiment (comic book) =

2019 comic book by Bastien Loukia

- Page count: 160 pages
- Publisher: Éditions Philippe Rey

Creative team
- Writer: Bastien Loukia, after Fyodor Dostoevsky
- Artist: Bastien Loukia

Original publication
- Date of publication: 5 September 2019
- Language: French
- ISBN: 978-2-84876-737-6

Crime et Châtiment (lit. 'Crime and Punishment') is a 2019 French comic book by Bastien Loukia. Set in Saint Petersburg in the 19th century, it follows the mental descent of the student Rodion Raskolnikov as he tries to justify the murder of a pawnbroker. The comic is an adaptation of the novel Crime and Punishment by Fyodor Dostoevsky.

It took two years to make the 160 pages long comic. Éditions Philippe Rey published it on 5 September 2019.
