= Appius Claudius Pulcher =

Appius Claudius Pulcher may refer to:

- Appius Claudius Pulcher (consul 212 BC)
- Appius Claudius Pulcher (consul 185 BC)
- Appius Claudius Pulcher (consul 143 BC)
- Appius Claudius Pulcher (consul 79 BC)
- Appius Claudius Pulcher (consul 54 BC)
- Appius Claudius Pulcher (consul 38 BC)
