= Eudoxia =

Eudoxia (Latin; also Ancient Greek: Εὐδοξία, Eudoxía) is a female given name meaning "she of good judgment", "good fame", or "good regard". It was mainly popular in late antiquity and during the Middle Ages, surviving longest in Eastern Europe, usually in honor of various saints. The name is also frequently (mistakenly) conflated with Eudocia.

== People ==
=== Saints ===
- Eudoxia of Heliopolis (d. 120), early Christian saint and martyr
- Eudoxia of Canopus - died 311 with sisters Theodota and Theoctiste, mother Athanasia, Saints Cyrus and John

=== Nobles ===
- Aelia Eudoxia (c. 380–404), Byzantine empress, daughter of Flavius Bauto and wife of Emperor Arcadius
- Licinia Eudoxia (422–462), Western Roman empress, daughter of Theodosius II and Aelia Eudocia, wife of Emperors Valentinian III and Petronius Maximus
- Eudoxia Epiphania (b. 611), daughter of emperor Heraclius and Fabia Eudokia
- Eudoxia, Byzantine princess, niece and mistress of Andronikos I Komnenos (c. 1118–1185)
- Eudoxia of Moscow or of Suzdal (Yevdokia) (d. 1407), Grand Duchess of the Grand Duchy of Moscow, wife of Dmitry Donskoy
- Eudoxia Lopukhina (1669–1731), first wife of Peter the Great

=== Fiction ===
- Eudoxia, a fictional character in the Anne Rice novel Blood and Gold
- Eudoxia, one of Italo Calvino's Invisible Cities
- Eudoxia, one of the colony worlds in The Expanse (Babylon’s Ashes)
- Eudoxia Vatatzes, mainspring character in Patrick White’s novel The Twyborn Affair
- Eudoxia Prade, a fictional character from The Immortals by Paul Stewart and Chris Riddell
- EUDOXIA, a fictional override code and game command in Galatea (video game)

== Places ==
- Eudoxias, city and bishopric in Galatia, Anatolia

== Ships ==
- MV Eudoxia, British cargo ship

== See also ==
- Avdotia, a popular female given name Russia derived from Eudoxia
- Eudoxus (disambiguation), male equivalent
- Eudoxius (given name), male equivalent
- List of Byzantine emperors
- List of Roman and Byzantine Empresses
