= Synecdemus =

Byzantine geography publication, 5th Century

The Synecdemus or Synekdemos (Greek: Συνέκδημος) is a geographic text, attributed to Hierocles, which contains a table of administrative divisions of the Byzantine Empire and lists of their cities. The work is dated to the reign of Justinian but prior to 535 AD, as it divides the 912 listed cities in the Empire among 64 Eparchies. The Synecdemus, along with the work of Stephanus of Byzantium were the principal sources of Constantine VII's work on the Themes (De Thematibus).

The Synecdemus was published in various editions beginning in 1735, notably by Gustav Parthey (Hieroclis Synecdemus; Berlin, 1866) and slightly later in a corrected text by A. Burckhardt in the Teubner series. The most recent major publication was by E. Honigmann (Le Synekdèmos d'Hiéroklès et l'opuscule géographique de Georges de Chypre; Brussels, 1939).

== Sources ==
- Parthey, Gustav (1866). Hieroclis Synecdemus et notitiae Graecae episcopatuum: Accedunt Nili Doxapatrii notitia patriarchatuum et locorum nomina immutata. Berolini: In aedibus Friderici Nicolai.
- Cohen, Getzel M. (2 November 1996). The Hellenistic Settlements in Europe, the Islands, and Asia Minor. University of California Press. ISBN 978-0-520-91408-7.
- Buchwald, Wolfgang; Hohlweg, Armin; Prinz, Otto; Jean-Denis Berger; Jacques Billen (1991). Dictionnaire des auteurs grecs et latins de l'Antiquité et du Moyen Âge. Brepols. p. 408.
- Kazhdan, Aleksandr Petrovich (1991). 930. Vol. 2. Oxford University Press. ISBN 978-0-19-504652-6.. (Oxford Dictionary of Byzantium)
