= Hierocles (author of Synecdemus) =

Byzantine geographer

Hierocles (Greek: Ἱεροκλῆς Hierokles) was a Byzantine geographer of the sixth century and the attributed author of the Synecdemus or Synekdemos, which contains a table of administrative divisions of the Byzantine Empire and lists of the cities of each. The work is dated to the reign of Justinian but prior to 535, as it divides the 912 listed cities in the Empire among 64 Eparchies. The Synecdemus is thus one of the most invaluable monuments which we have to study the political geography of the sixth century East. The work of Hierocles along with that of Stephanus of Byzantium were the principal sources of Constantine VII's work on the Themes (De Thematibus). Hierocles was published by Parthey (Hieroclis Synecdemus; Berlin, 1866) then in a corrected text, by A. Burckhardt in the Teubner series (Hieroclis Synecdemus; Leipzig, 1893). The most recent major publication was by E. Honigmann (Le Synekdèmos d'Hiéroklès et l'opuscule géographique de Georges de Chypre; Brussels, 1939).

The Synecdemus of Hierocles should not be confused with a Greek Orthodox prayer book by the same name.
