= Tunisian salt lakes =

Salted depressions between Gulf of Gabès and Algerian border

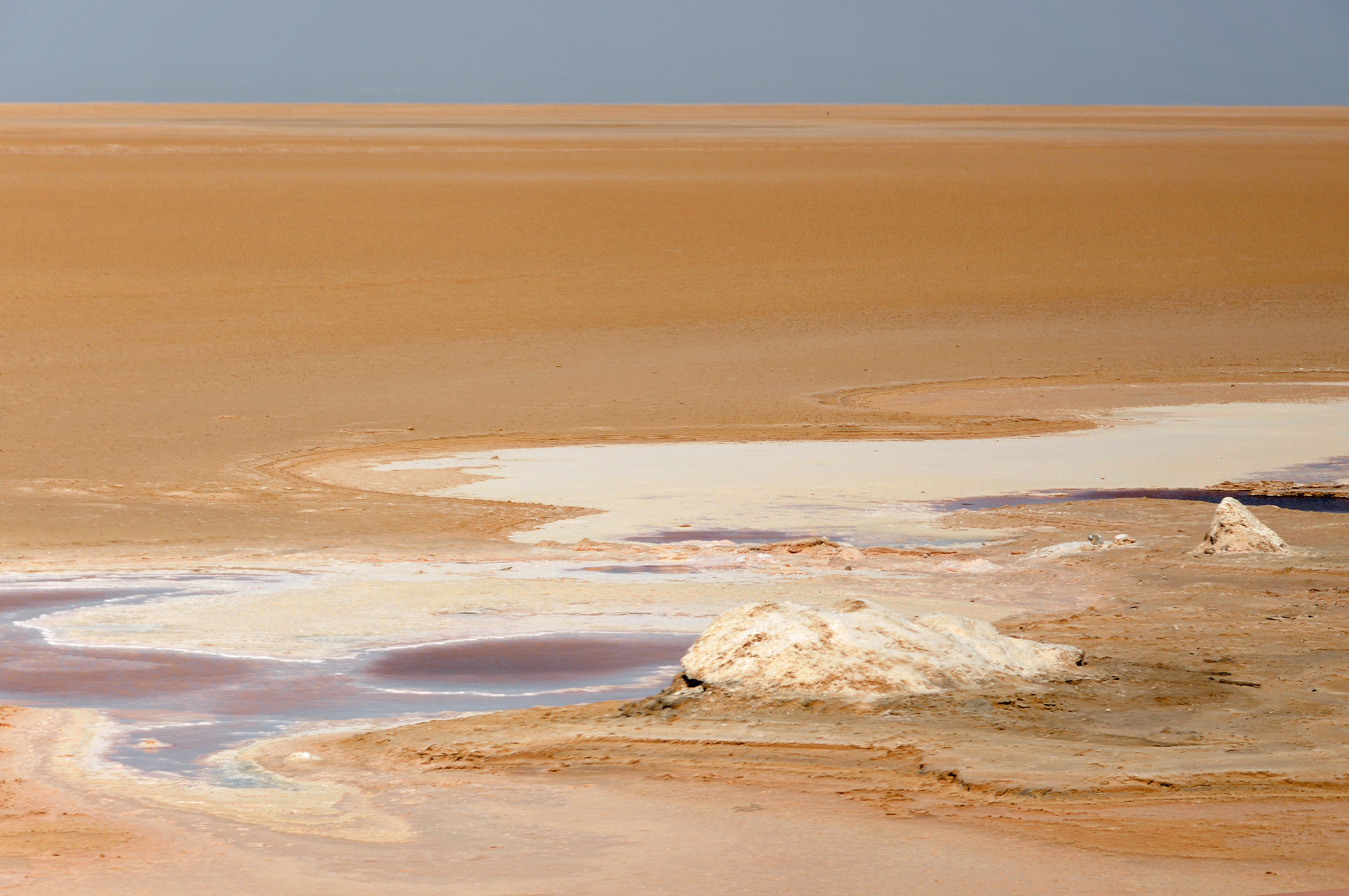
Chott El Jerid, one of the Tunisian salt lakes

Location of the Tunisian salt lakes

The Tunisian salt lakes are a series of lakes in central Tunisia, lying south of the Atlas Mountains at the northern edge of the Sahara. The lakes include, from east to west, the Chott el Fedjedj, Chott el Djerid, and Chott el Gharsa.

== Geography ==
These salt lakes stretch with only two short breaks in a line from the Mediterranean at the Gulf of Gabès to the Algerian frontier, which they penetrate for a considerable distance. The French term "chott" is a transliteration of the Arabic shat, a term for a broad canal, an estuary or lake. These shats however are, strictly speaking, not lakes at all at the present day. They are smooth depressed areas (in the case of the largest, the Shat el Jerid, lying a few feet below the level of the Mediterranean), which for more than half the year are expanses of dried mud covered with a thick incrustation of white or grey salt. This salt covering gives them at a distance the appearance of big sheets of water.

During the winter, however, when the effect of the rare winter rains is felt, there may actually be 3 or 4 ft. of water in these shats, which by liquefying the mud makes them perfectly impassable. Otherwise, for about seven months of the year they can be crossed on foot or on horseback. It would seem probable that at one time these shats (at any rate the Shat el Jerid) were an inlet of the Mediterranean, which by the elevation of a narrow strip of land on the Gulf of Gabès has been cut off from them. It is, however, a region of past volcanic activity, and these salt depressions may be due to that cause. Man is probably the principal agent at the present day in causing these shats to be without water. All around these salt lakes there are numerous springs, gushing from the sandy hillocks. Almost all these springs are at a very hot temperature, often at boiling point. Some of them are charged with salt, others are perfectly fresh and sweet, though boiling hot. So abundant is their volume that in several places they form actual ever-flowing rivers. Only for the intervention of man these rivers would at all times find their way into the adjoining depressions, which they would maintain as lakes of water. But for a long period past the freshwater streams (which predominate) have been used for irrigation to such a degree that very little of the precious water is allowed to run to waste into the lake basins; so that these latter receive only a few salt streams, which deposit on their surface the salt they contain and then evaporate. This abundant supply of fresh warm water maintains oases of extraordinary luxuriance in a country where rain falls very rarely. Perennial streams of the description referred to are found between the Algerian frontier and Gabès on the coast. The town at Gabès itself is on the fringe of a splendid oasis, which is maintained by the water of an ever-running stream emptying itself into the sea at Gabès after a course of not more than 20 miles.

All this region round the shats has been called the "Jerid" from the time of the Arab occupation. "Jerid" means in Arabic a "palm frond" and inferentially "a palm grove." The fame of this Belad-el-Jerid, or "Country of the Date Palms", was so exaggerated during the 17th and 18th centuries that the European geographers extended the designation from this small area in the south of Tunisia to cover much of inner Africa. With this country of Jerid may be included the island of Jerba, which lies close to the coast of Tunisia in the Gulf of Gabès. The date palm (Phoenix dactylifera) may be indigenous to this district of the Jerid, as it is to countries of similar description in southern Morocco, southern Algeria, parts of the Tripolitania, Egypt, Mesopotamia, southern Persia and north-western India; but that north of the latitude of the Jerid the date did not grow naturally in Mauretania, just as it was foreign to all parts of Europe, in which, as in true North Africa, its presence is due to the hand of man. To some extent it may be said that true North Africa lies to the north of the Jerid country, which, besides its Saharan, Arabian and Persian affinities, has a touch about it of real Africa, some such touch as may be observed in the valley of the Jordan. In the oases of the Jerid are found several species of tropical African mammals and two or three of Senegalese birds, and the vegetation seems to have as much affinity with tropical Africa as with Europe. In fact, the country between the Matmata highlands and the strait separating Jerba from the mainland is singularly African in the character and aspect of its flora. To the south of the Jerid the country is mainly desert — vast unexplored tracts of shifting sand, with rare oases. Nevertheless, all this southern district of Tunisia bears evidence of once having been subject to a heavy rainfall, which scooped out deep valleys in the original table-land, and has justified the present existence of immense watercourses — watercourses which are still, near their origin, favoured with a little water.

The narrow sandy ridge separating the Chott el Fejej from the Mediterranean Sea brought it to the attention of various geographers, engineers and diplomats. These figures looked to create an inland "Sahara Sea" by channelling the waters of the Mediterranean into Sahara Desert basins which lay below sea level. A noted proposal to this effect was put forward in the late 1800s by French geographer François Élie Roudaire and the creator of the Suez Canal, Ferdinand de Lesseps, but stalled after the French government withdrew funding. Later proposals, made as part of Operation Plowshare, posited that nuclear explosives could be used to dig the proposed canal from the Mediterranean to the Chott el Fejej and other below-sea-level basins of the Sahara; these proposals were also fruitless.

== See also ==
- Chott
- Sabkha
- Sahara Sea
