= Hamet Jerid =

Coordinates: 34.0205°N 8.17692°E

Hamet Jerid حامة الجريد Hamet Djerid
- Commune and town
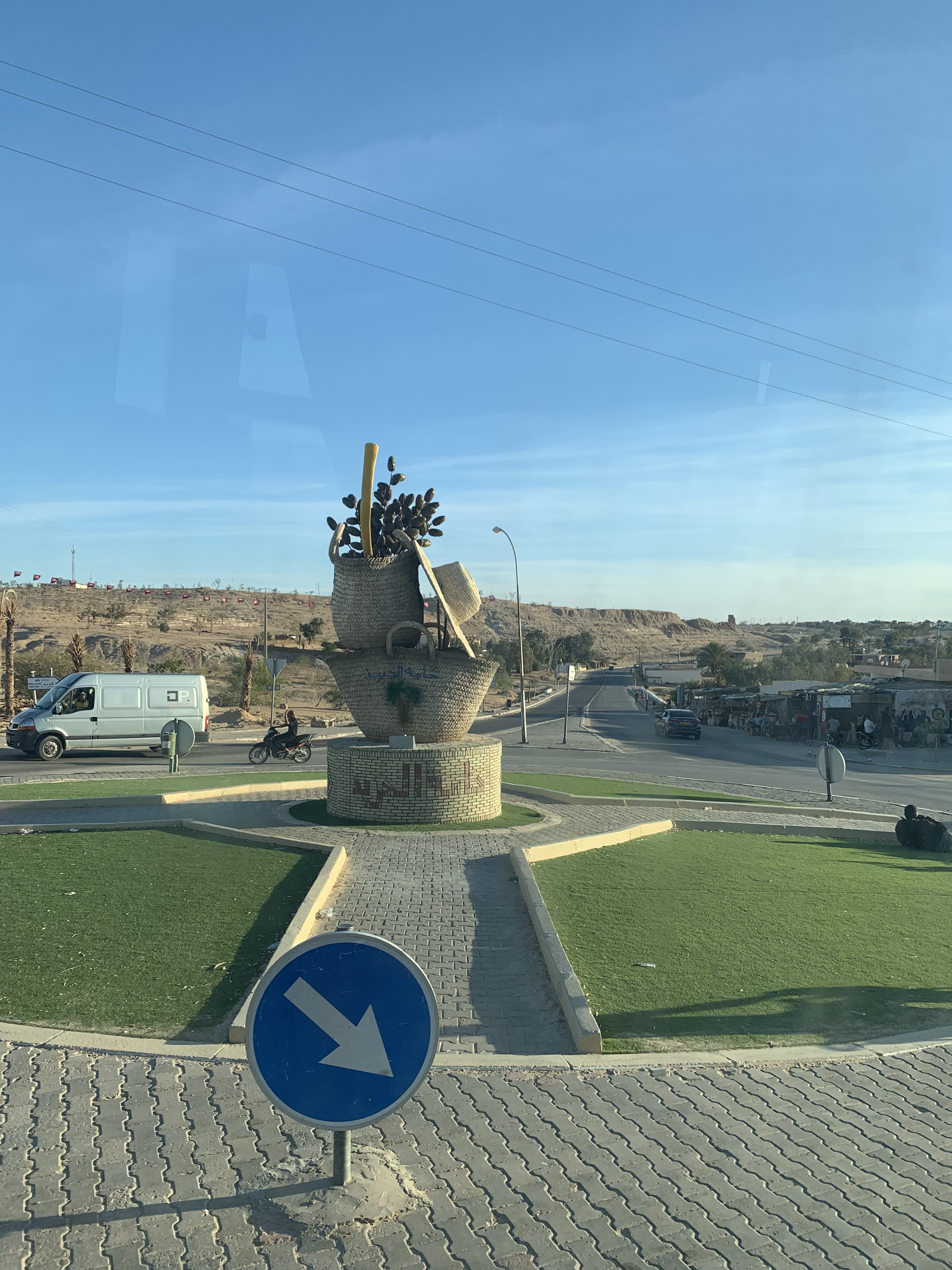
- Roundabout in El Hamma du Jérid
- Interactive map of Hamet Jerid
- Country: Tunisia
- Governorate: Tozeur Governorate

Population (2014)
  - Total: 6,467
- Time zone: UTC+1 (CET)

Hamet Jerid (or simply el-Hamma), also spelled Hamet Djerid (Arabic: حامة الجريد, French: El Hamma du Jérid), is an oasis town and municipality in the Djerid region in southwest Tunisia. As of 2014, it had a population of 6,467.

The oasis's palm grove has been exploited since the Roman times. It was supplied by about twenty springs, six of which were hot springs; some had chlorinated, sodium-rich, and sulfurous water. Until recently, people still visited to take baths. Now, the springs have been replaced by modern deep wells. The modern palm grove of El Hamma, created in the 20th century, is exclusively planted with the date palm cultivar that produces deglet nour.

The town has been mentioned in historical sources since the early Middle Ages as one of the four metropolitan cities of the region of Castillia. In the 9th century, Arab Geographer Ya'qubi wrote: "The cities of Castillia are four, situated in a vast land of palm and olive trees. The greater city is Tozeur, where the workers reside; the second is known as el-Hamma, the third Thiges, and the fourth Nefta."

== Etymology ==
Hamma comes from the Arabic word "الحام" that means "hot water", referring to the hot springs, while Djerid (or Jérid) refers to the Djerid region. It was also known as Hamma of Beni Bahloul, after the main tribe that settled there.

During the Roman empire, the town was known as Aquae. Later, after the Arab conquest, the name changed to el-Hamma. Both terms—Aquae (or Aqua/Aquas) in Latin and el-Hamma in Arabic—were frequently used to denote hot springs oases. In modern-day Tunisia, other oasis towns still hold the name, such as el-Hamma in Gabès.

== History ==
=== Roman ===
The town was known as Aquae and was part of the southern Byzance province. The town of Aquae, is believed to be stood on the site of present-day Guebbech.

At the time, several ancient roads passed through the town. One of these roads was a major route linking Theveste to Tacape (modern Gabès). It began at the military camp of Theveste, passed through the station of Alonianum, then continued to Cerva, followed by Ad Turres and Speculum. From there, the road entered the Djerid region, reaching Aquae (el-Hamma) via the eastern edge of Chott el-Gharsa.

=== Early Islamic/Arab rule ===
Due to its proximity to the desert, this region was among the first in North Africa to be affected by the Islamic conquest in the 7th century. The early Muslim conquerors took desert routes, avoiding main roads to circumvent direct clashes with Byzantine forces, which had fortified the strait between the Gulf of Gabes and Chott Djerid.

According to Ibn Abd Al-Hakam, the conquest of the Djerid region followed the capture of Gafsa, indicating that Uqba ibn Nafi advanced along the path between Djerid and Nefzaoua. The area was initially conquered by Uqba ibn Nafi in 670 and later definitively by Hassan ibn al-Nu'man in 698.

During the early Islamic period, the region of Djerid was part of the larger western Islamic provinces, stretching from Tripoli to Morocco. Tozeur, the capital of Djerid, was known for its agriculture, including an abundance of date palms, and was fortified with strong walls and bustling markets. The city also had access to water from three rivers, which were divided into channels for irrigation.

The Hamma community was distinguished by its diverse population. The majority of its inhabitants were Berber, Roman, and African, while the Arab presence remained limited until the arrival of the Hilalites in the mid-9th century. Over time, the Arab population gradually increased, particularly during the Hafsid era, which saw further waves of migration. The Christian population of the Djerid region maintained a stable presence, at least until the arrival of the Almohads in the 12th century.

==== A center of Ibadism ====
The Djerid region, particularly during the early Islamic period, played a significant role in the development of the Ibadhi Islamic sect. Al-Hamma and key cities like Tozeur, Nafṭa, and Qantarara were important centers, both politically and religiously. The region became a refuge for the Ibadhi due to persecution in other areas. Berber tribes such as the Nafzaoua settled in this region, supporting the Ibadhi doctrine and influencing its spread. Other berber tribes included the Kzita tribe, a branch of the Mazata, once lived between Tozeur and Al-Hamma.

Among the most notable Ibadite scholars of the 10th century were Abū al-Qāsim Yazīd ibn Mukhlid and Abū Khazr Yeghel ibn Zaltav, both from Al-Hamma. Fatimid Caliph al-Mu‘izz was impressed by Ibn Mukhlid, bringing him into his court and organizing several scholarly debates in which he participated. However, this favor was short-lived. Courtiers accused Abū al-Qāsim of plotting to lead his people in rebellion against the Fatimid state. Influenced by these allegations, al-Mu‘izz ordered his execution. His death led to an uprising led by his associate, Abū Khazr Yeghel ibn Zaltav.

In the 11th century, the arrival of the Banu Hilal tribe weakened the influence of Ibadism. Today, Ibadites remain a minority today in the Djerid region and overall Tunisia.

=== Middle Ages ===
Since the mid-12th century, the region was dominated by the Almohads, though their rule was marked by significant upheavals. Among these was the intense conflict with Bani Ghaniya, a dynasty originating from the Balearic Islands, which sought to establish an Almoravid rule. Using the Jerid region as their base, they launched raids against the Almohads, leading to widespread violence and destruction. Historical sources indicate that Hamma de Castillia was a key battleground in this conflict. Ibn Khaldun recorded that in 1220, the Almohads secured a decisive victory over Yahya Al-Mayorki at Hamma, resulting in heavy casualties among Bani Ghaniya's supporters. Ibn Khaldun also mentioned a figure from Hamma Djerid named Harakat Ben Assaker, who was killed during the conflict between the Almohads and the Bani Ghaniyah in 618 AH. He wrote:"When Abu Mohammed Ibn Abi Hafs defeated Yahya al-Mu'ayraqi alongside the Almohads in the year 618 AH in Hamma of Djerid, several Arabs were killed. Among those who died that day were Abdullah Ibn Mohammed and his cousin, Abu Sheikh Ibn Harakat Ibn Assaker."

=== 21st Century ===
The municipality of Hamet Jerid was established in 2016, as one of the five municipalities of the governorate of Tozur. Previously in 1975, it had an official designation as a locality.

== Population ==
References to the population of el-Hamma and the Djerid during the Middle Ages appear in the works of geographers and historians of the 9th century. Al-Ya'qubi states: “Al Hamma, like all regions of Castillia, is inhabited by Roman, African, and Berber peoples.” The anonymous author of Al-Istibsar fi 'agaib al-Amsar refers to the city as “Hamma of Bani Bahloul” and describes its inhabitants: “Bani Bahloul are the masters of a region in Castillia, but they are also the wealthiest. They are the remnants of the Romans who retained their wealth. Known for their generosity and hospitality, they became widely renowned throughout the land.”

The Berbers, who formed the majority of el-Hamma’s population until at least the 13th century, included members of the Zenata tribe. Among them were descendants of Bani Wasiani, such as Abu Kasim Yazid ibn Mukhlid and Abu Khazar Yeghel ibn Zaltav. Historical sources also mention the Ibadite merchant Tameli Wasiani, who amassed great wealth through trade with Sudan.

Other Berber groups documented in historical sources were also likely present in el-Hamma, given the demographic and cultural unity of the broader Djerid region. For example, the Kazina tribe of Mezzita settled between el-Hamma and Tozeur, while the Bani Yafran tribe was located in Sadeda—the birthplace of Abu al-Thayr Abu Yazid Saheb Al-Himar.

During the Hafsid period, the Arab population of el-Hamma increased, mirroring trends across the Djerid. The region saw an influx of migrants from the Bani Merdas tribe, whose settlement was facilitated through alliances between Arab tribes and local authorities. These agreements, often involving financial incentives and tax arrangements, encouraged Arab migration and integration into the region.

=== 21st century ===
According to the national census in 2004, the locality of Hamet Jerid had a population of 6,259 inhabitants. In 2014, it had a population of 6,467.

== Culture ==
In December 2015, the construction of a cultural center in the town was announced. Known as the Palace of Culture of Hamet Djerid (French: Maison de la culture El Hamma du Jerid), the facility officially opened in 2018 and features a 300-seat auditorium. It hosts several social and cultural activities.

On April 18, 2024, archaeological artifacts were stolen from the Roman site of Guebbech. The stolen items consisted of large stone blocks that were originally part of Roman structures in the area. Investigators found traces of tractors and the use of heavy machinery, indicating that several large stone artifacts had been gathered, loaded onto a tractor, and transported to an unknown location.

== Historical monuments ==
=== El Hajj Zayed Mosque ===
The Mosque El Hajj Zayed is situated in the village of Hamma, south of El Erg, near the border of the oasis. Architectural analysis suggests that the structure dates to the 19th century, as it exhibits design elements characteristic of other religious edifices from this period in the Djerid region, particularly in its column construction. In addition to its religious function, the mosque also served as an educational institution, accommodating ten students in 1875. However, following the floods of 1990, the site was abandoned.

The mosque's layout includes a rectangular courtyard, accessible via an entrance on the eastern side. At the southeastern corner, a six-step staircase was utilized by the muezzin for the call to prayer, while ritual ablutions were conducted in a nearby valley.

The prayer hall, located to the north of the courtyard, is entered through a vaulted doorway featuring a semicircular arch framed by two windows. The hall measures 10 meters in length and 7.3 meters in width, with a ceiling constructed from palm wood, supported by two balustrades running parallel to the qibla wall. The arches, which rest on octagonal columns, contribute to the structural integrity of the space. At the center of the qibla wall, the mihrab is distinguished by a semicircular arch supported by cylindrical pillars.

=== Maamra Mosque ===
The Maamra Mosque is a well-preserved mosque in El Hamma Village, west of El Erg. The mosque is accessed through an entrance on its northeastern side, which features a semi-circular arch set within a recessed rectangular frame. This entrance is accompanied by two windows and three niches designed for illumination. While the precise date of the mosque’s construction remains undetermined, it was referenced in a text from 1860–1861 in relation to its proximity to the bath oasis known as Bostan Doubeb.

The mosque’s interior comprises a rectangular hall measuring 10.5 by 9 meters. Its ceiling, constructed from palm wood, is supported by two arches running parallel to the qibla wall. Each arch consists of three semi-circular arches connected by wooden beams, though only a few of these beams remain. The arches rest on cylindrical columns measuring 1.3 meters in height and 50 centimeters in diameter, with square support elements positioned atop them.

The mihrab, centrally positioned on the qibla wall, is 2 meters in height, 95 centimeters in width, and 65 centimeters in depth. It is characterized by a semi-circular arch supported by two cylindrical columns and framed by a prominent rectangular structure measuring 2.4 meters in height and 1.7 meters in width.

=== Sidi Bourrai Sanctuary ===
The Sidi Bourrai Sanctuary is located in the middle of the El Hamma oasis, near the touristic road and close to the site of Gabbech. This religious monument features a funerary room housing the shrine of Sidi Bourrai, topped by a semi-circular dome.

The structure is supported by four transcendent semicircular arches resting on rectangular terracotta brick pillars fixed to the walls. These arches help support the dome, which covers the mausoleum room and includes corner niches and small windows for lighting.

In addition to the sanctuary room, the monument includes two adjacent rooms: one designated for visitor services and the other used as a prayer space.

=== Sidi Hamad Ben Amer Sanctuary ===
The Sidi Hamad Ben Amer Sanctuary is located within a palm grove in the heart of the El Hamma oasis. This religious monument houses a funerary room containing two shrines, one dedicated to Sidi Hamad Ben Amer and the other to Sidi Talha, both topped by a semi-circular dome.

The structure is in average condition. The burial chamber is square, measuring 4.80 meters on each side, with an entrance featuring a 1.20-meter-long wooden door. Each of the four walls has two semicircular arches resting on rectangular terracotta pillars attached to the walls. These arches support the dome covering the mausoleum hall, along with corner arches and small windows for lighting.

=== Sidi Nafaa Sanctuary ===
The Sidi Nafaa sanctuary is situated in the Msabhia district, at the heart of the El Hamma oasis, in a low-lying area. This religious monument comprises a funerary chamber and an adjoining room designated for visitor services, all enclosed by a stone wall. The site also contains several tombs, the remnants of which are still visible today.

The mausoleum chamber itself is square-shaped, measuring 4.50 meters per side. It houses the tomb of Sidi Nafi', which is topped by an oval dome. Each of the chamber’s four walls features transverse semi-circular arches supported by rectangular pillars embedded in the walls. The structure is built with terracotta bricks and corner arches, and includes small windows that provide natural lighting.

== See also ==
- List of cities in Tunisia

== Sources ==
- Ville et patrimoine d'Hamma Djerid, Étude par Mourad Chitoui et Dheker Sila, Association Persone Come Noi, 2021 (in French, English, and Arabic)
