= Degache =

Degache دقاش
- Commune and town
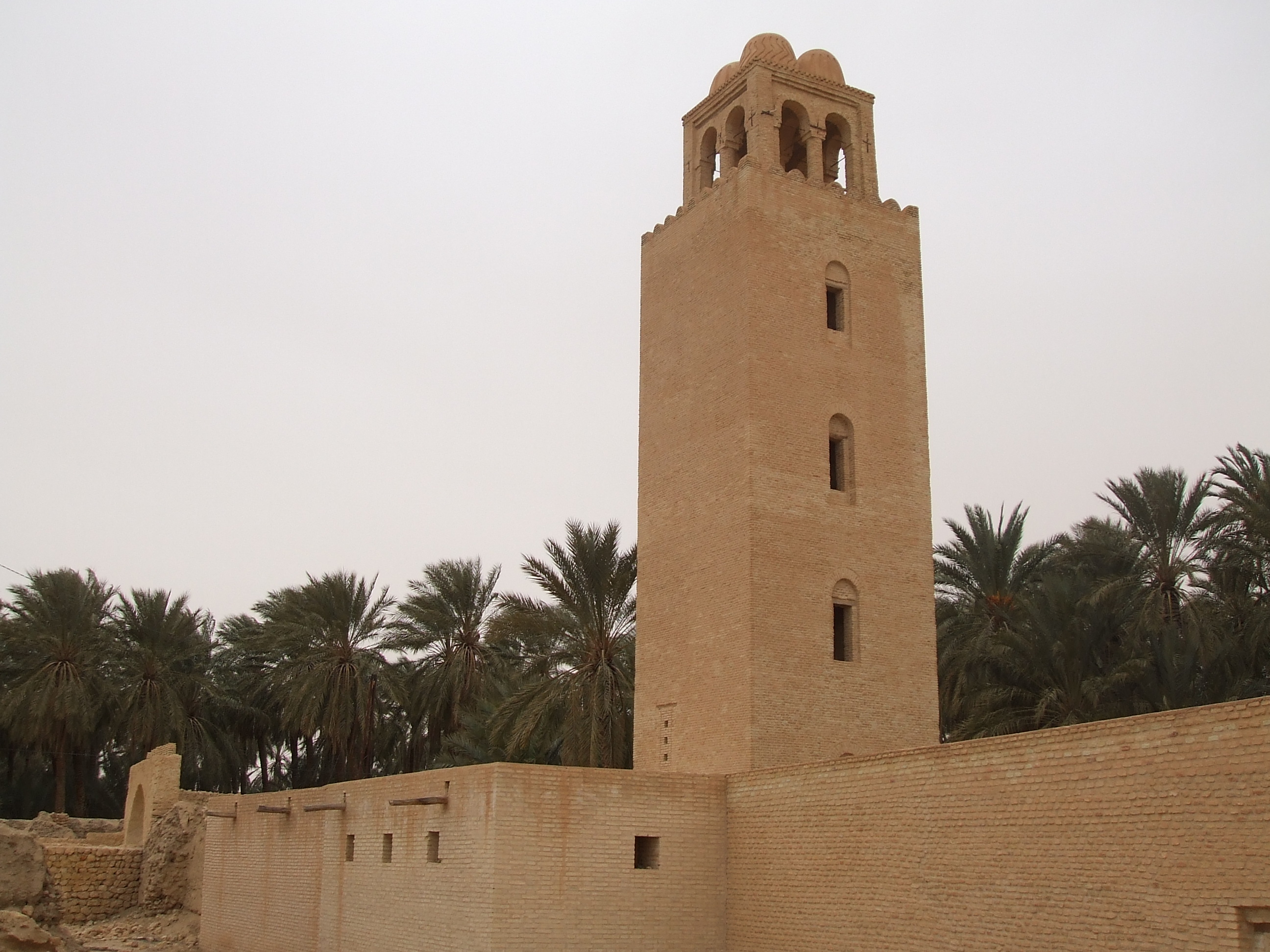
- Ouled Majed mosque in Degache

- Location in Tunisia
- Coordinates: 33°59′N 8°13′E
- Country: Tunisia
- Governorate: Tozeur Governorate
- Delegation(s): Degache

Population (2014)
  - Total: 14,332
- Time zone: UTC+1 (CET)
- Post code: 2260

Degache (Arabic: دقاش), also spelled Degueche, is a Tunisian town and commune situated in the region of Djerid, and part of Tozeur Governorate. It had a population of 14,332 in 2014, and is the biggest town of a delegation bearing its name.

== History ==
Degache began as an oasis exploited since Roman antiquity. The ancient city of Thagis is situated a few kilometres away.

== Geography ==
The town is located on the northern shore of the salt lake Chott el Djerid, 12 km east of Tozeur and 92 km west of Gafsa.

== Tourism ==
The economy of the town is centred on the exploitation of a rich palm plantation, producing deglet nour dates. A centre for phœnicicoles research has been located there. Degache has also 2 industrial areas. It's also increasingly included in south Tunisian Saharan tourist circuits.

== Transport ==
Degache has a railway station on the Gafsa-Tozeur line, part of the Tunisian Railways (SNCFT) network. It is served by the national highways RN3 and RN16, the second one crossing the Chott el Djerid to reach Douz. Nearest airport, 13 km far, is Tozeur–Nefta International Airport.

== Population ==
2014 Census (Municipal)
| Homes | Families | Males | Females | Total |
|---|---|---|---|---|
| 4130 | 3538 | 6930 | 7402 | 14332 |

== See also ==
- List of cities in Tunisia
