= Arzugitana =

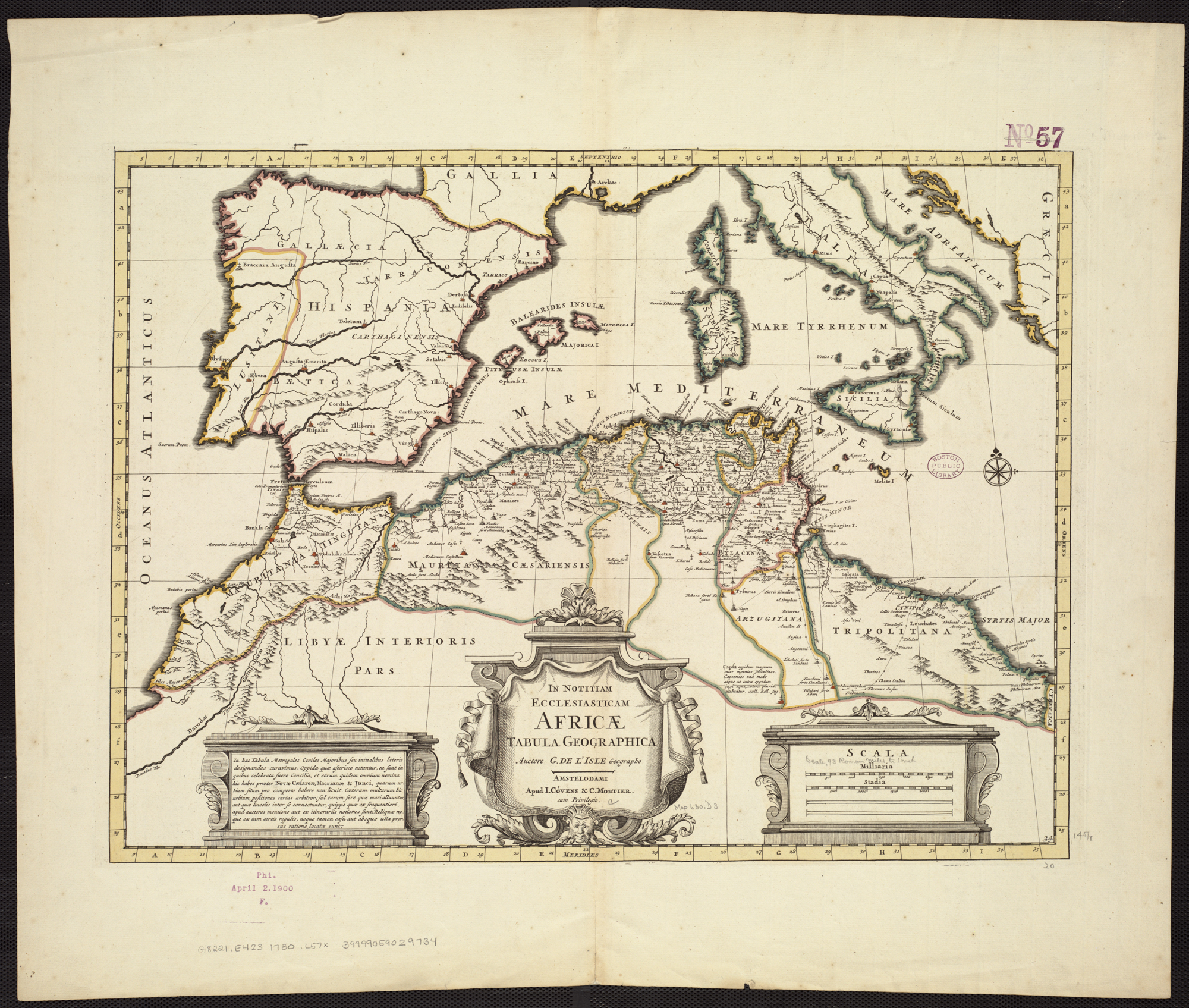
Notitiam ecclesiasticam Africæ tabula geographica

Arzugitana was a region of North Africa during antiquity.

Arzugitana was on the interior plateau of what is today southern Tunisia and which abuts the Sahara Desert roughly equivalent to the Tataouine Governorate of modern Tunisia. During antiquity this was an isolated and strategically important area being part of the interface with the barbarian world and the Roman Empire, It had an essentially military organization along the Limes Tripolitanus of the Roman Empire. The area was semi-arid, and to the south was the sands of the edge of the Sahara Desert.

The region stretched from Nepte to Garama. It also encompassed some oases, such as the Oasis of Nefzaoua and Djerid bordering the Chott el-Djrid.

== History ==
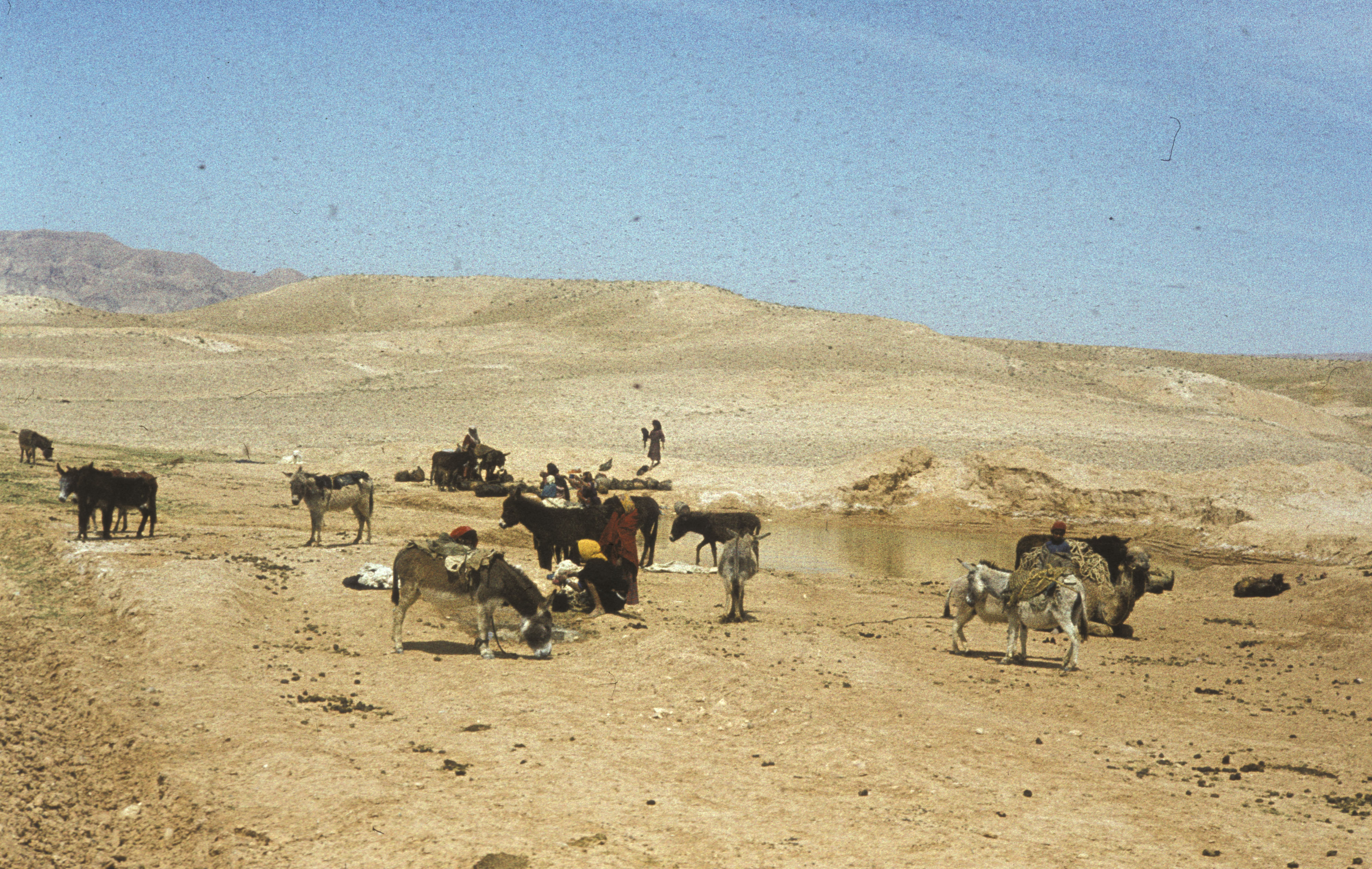
Arzugitana, 1960.

The region was discussed by Pliny, and Victor of Vita

The name Arzugitani may be connected to the region to the north named Zeugitana according to Pliny in the 1st century.

In the 1st - 2nd century the name Arzugitana came to refer generally to the peoples of southern Tripolitania. The peoples of this semi-arid region north of the northern edge of the Sahara began to be called the Arzuges in the 3rd century by the legio III Augusta who were based to the north, in Africa Proconsularea. The Roman military authorities at this time insulated Arzugitana from rule by the coastal cities for military reasons.

Arzugitana was an ecclesiastical region and there were some bishoprics in Arzugitana, including some located in the oases of the Nefzaoua and Djerid and also at Tuzuius

The fall of Rome "offered unprecedented opportunities for the communities of semi-arid Saharan zone and their political elites, and may be seen as a period of renaissance in the region, at least in the political sphere." The Arzuges managed to recover their autonomy.

"Subsequently, neither the Vandal monarchy nor the East Roman exarchate appear to have re-established direct rule over the Tripolitanian hinterland. Instead the native communities of the pre-desert wadis and Jebel ranges may have been absorbed in a larger tribal confederation variously labeled the Laguatan, Levathae or, in the Arabic sources, the Lawata.

The inhabitants of this region have longstanding and distinct sense of identity, which probably underwent a revival in late Antiquity. The support for the Ibadi movement shown by the communities of the Jebel, Nefusa and the Jerid oasis in the heart of the former Arzugitana suggests that this regional sense of identity and consequent desire for autonomy were maintained into the early medieval period and acquired a new emblematic marker in the adoption of the Ibadi faith. Indeed, Savage suggests that many of the 'tribal' groups which figure in the sources in this period, notably the Nefusa, may represent alliances of disparate communities which coalesced at this very time in response to the catalyst provided by the egalitarian Ibadi message and were retrospectively legitimized with a genealogical tribal framework."

In early Islamic Tunisia Arzugitana corresponds roughly with the Rustamid kingdom. Islam was fiercely resisted in the Hinterland, with the Muslim conquest of the Maghreb taking almost a century to be completed in this region.
