= Melanella minor =

Scientific classification
- Kingdom: Animalia
- Phylum: Mollusca
- Class: Gastropoda
- Subclass: Caenogastropoda
- Order: Littorinimorpha
- Family: Eulimidae
- Genus: Melanella
- Species: M. minor

Binomial name
- Melanella minor (Pallary, 1904)

Synonyms
- Eulima praecurta var. minor Pallary, 1904

Species of gastropod

Melanella minor is a species of sea snail, a marine gastropod mollusk in the family Eulimidae. The species is one of many species known to exist within the genus, Melanella.

== Distribution ==
This marine species occurs in the Gulf of Gabès, Tunisia.
