= Melanella praecurta =

- Shell of Melanella praecurta (syntype in the MNHN, Paris)

Scientific classification
- Kingdom: Animalia
- Phylum: Mollusca
- Class: Gastropoda
- Subclass: Caenogastropoda
- Order: Littorinimorpha
- Family: Eulimidae
- Genus: Melanella
- Species: M. praecurta

Binomial name
- Melanella praecurta (Pallary, 1904)

Synonyms
- Eulima praecurta Pallary, 1904

Species of gastropod

Melanella praecurta is a species of sea snail, a marine gastropod mollusk in the family Eulimidae. The species is one of many species known to exist within the genus, Melanella.

== Description ==
The length of the shell attains 5 mm, its diameter 2 mm.

(Original description in Latin) The turreted shell is rather acute, moderately solid, extremely glossy, and subpellucid; the spire is slightly curved. There are 8 1/2 contiguous, rather flat whorls, which are joined by a thin but distinct suture and grow slowly, with the body whorl being a little larger. The aperture is oval, acute in the upper part, and the columellar margin is callous. The outer lip is arched and rounded. The color is ivory.

== Distribution ==
This marine species occurs in the Gulf of Gabès, Tunisia.
