= François Élie Roudaire =

French author, military officer and geographer

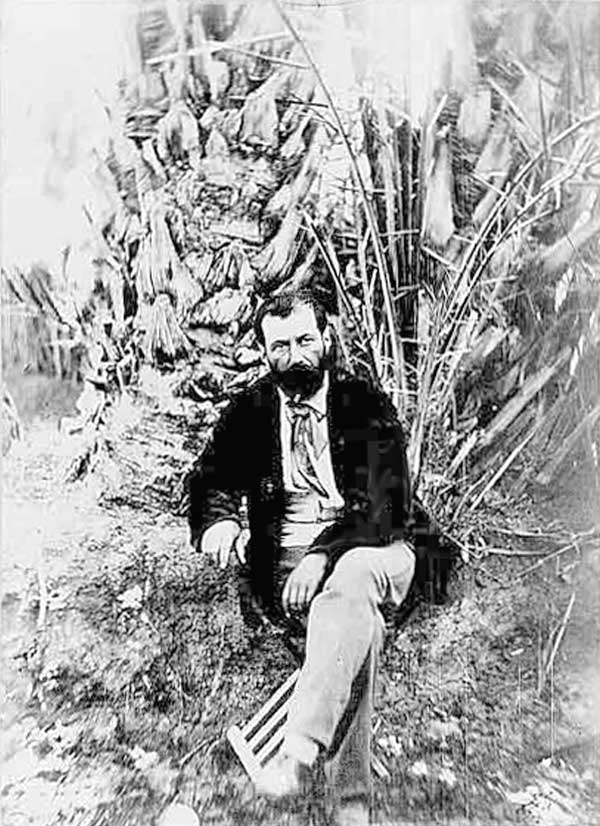
François Élie Roudaire in 1879

François Élie Roudaire (6 August 1836, Guéret – 14 January 1885, Guéret) was a French writer, military officer and geographer. He, along with Ferdinand de Lesseps, was a proponent of creating an inland Sahara Sea by flooding areas of the Sahara Desert which were below sea level.

== Early life and military career ==
Roudaire was born into a middle-class family. His father, François Joseph Roudaire, was director of the Natural History Museum of Guéret. After classical studies in his hometown, François Élie turned towards a scientific career in the army. He entered the Ecole Spéciale Militaire de Saint-Cyr in 1854. In 1864, he was assigned to Algeria as an officer surveyor, given the task of creating a geodesic and topographic survey of the colony. Operating south of Biskra, in Constantine Province, he explored the region's chotts, and was one of the first to accurately measure their depth, noting that many lay below sea level.

== Proposal of a Sahara Sea ==
Having discovered many locations far below sea level (up to 40 metres (130 ft)), Roudaire became convinced that a vast depression once extended to the salty Gulf of Gabès and corresponded to a geographic feature known at the time of Herodotus as Lake Tritonis (also known as the Bay of Triton). In an article written for the Revue des Deux Mondes in 1874, titled "An inland sea in Algeria," François Élie Roudaire proposed to recreate the former sea by cutting a channel from the Chott el Fejej to the Gulf of Gabès. He argued that the mass of water would allow water transport, as well as significantly alter the climate; it would turn the arid region of the Sahara into one of considerably greater fertility. Ferdinand de Lesseps, who was instrumental in the creation of the Suez Canal, adopted the idea along with several other writers, scholars and politicians.

While there was initially general enthusiasm for the project, further surveys discovered that one of the chotts that Roudaire and de Lesseps had proposed digging a canal to was, in fact, above sea level. This reduction in floodable area (a reduction of between 6,000 square kilometres (2,300 sq mi) and 8,000 square kilometres (3,100 sq mi)), and the cost of a channel 240 kilometres (150 mi) long, caused a loss of support from within the government, leading the Public Works Minister to cancel the project in 1882. Roudaire and Ferdinand de Lesseps fell back on private funding and founded the Society for the Study of African inland sea later that year to continue their pursuit of the project. Criticism of the project from within the scientific community mounted, however, and the project was abandoned shortly before Roudaire's death in 1885.

== Portrayals in literature ==
- Jules Verne, Invasion of the Sea (1905).

== Decorations ==
- First class medal awarded by the International Geographical Congress (11 August 1875)
- Grade Officer of the Legion of Honour (6 October 1875)
- Grade Officer of Public Instruction (28 August 1876)
- Gold Medal of the Geographical Society (March 1877)
- Great Medal of Honor Society (March 1877)

== Publications ==
- Premier rapport sur la mission des chotts publié par l'instruction publique (January 1877)
- Deuxième rapport sur les missions des chotts publié par l'instruction publique (January 1881)
- La mer intérieure africaine (September 1883)

== See also ==
- Herman Sörgel
