= Raphitoma arnoldi =

Scientific classification
- Kingdom: Animalia
- Phylum: Mollusca
- Class: Gastropoda
- Subclass: Caenogastropoda
- Order: Neogastropoda
- Superfamily: Conoidea
- Family: Raphitomidae
- Genus: Raphitoma
- Species: R. arnoldi

Binomial name
- Raphitoma arnoldi Pallary, 1904

Synonyms
- Clathurella papillosa var. arnoldi (Pallary, 1906); Philbertia papillosa var. arnoldi Pallary, 1906; Raphitoma (Philbertia) arnoldi Nordsieck, 1977

Species of gastropod

Raphitoma arnoldi is a species of sea snail, a marine gastropod mollusk in the family Raphitomidae.

== Description ==
The length of the shell varies between 5 mm and 14 mm.

The shell differs from Raphitoma papillosa (Pallary, 1904) by its taller shape, narrower whorls and by its more compact and regular reticulation.

== Distribution ==
This species occurs in the Western and Central Mediterranean Sea.
