= H-1 (date) =

- Genus: Phoenix
- Species: Phoenix dactylifera
- Breeder: Witthaya Saengkhun
- Origin: Pa Mok District, Ang Thong Province, Thailand

H-1 (also known as H1 or Heng One) is a tropical cultivar date palm (Phoenix dactylifera) selection and breeding results originating from Thailand. This variety was developed specifically to adapt to wet tropical climates with high rainfall and humidity, so it is popularly cultivated in Southeast Asian countries, including Indonesia.

== History ==
The name Heng One (abbreviated H-1) is taken from the name of the date palm plantation and breeder from Thailand who developed it, namely Mr. Heng (Witthaya Saengkhun) at Baan Suan Inthaphalam Heng Heng (บ้านสวนอินทผลัมเฮงเฮง) garden located in Pa Mok District, Ang Thong Province, Thailand.

This cultivar is the result of further refinement and selection of the previous generation of Thai tropical date varieties, namely KL-1 (Kolak One). The development of this variety aims to produce date palm trees that are fast-growing (fruiting quickly), resistant to extreme humidity, and has a sweet taste even though it is harvested in the ripe phase (khalal).

== Characteristics ==
The H-1 date palm has a number of agronomic and morphological characteristics that distinguish it from both Middle Eastern date varieties and its tropical predecessors:

- In contrast to the Barhee or KL-1 dates which are generally only yellow in color in the young phase, the propagation of H-1 from selected seeds produces a variety of fruit colors, ranging from yellow, orange, to bright red. The bright red fruit variant tends to be more popular in the market due to its visual appearance and higher sweetness level.
- In the ripe phase (khalal or young dates), the flesh of the fruit has a crunchy texture, is juicy, and has almost no astringent taste (low tannin content). The sweetness level of the fruit can reach around 30–32 °Bx, higher than the average for conventional tropical dates which is around 25 °Bx.
- With optimal maintenance, irrigation, and fertilization techniques, H-1 date palms begin to flower and bear fruit at around 2 to 3 years after planting.
- H-1 dates have relatively good resistance to air humidity and tropical rainfall, so the risk of fruit falling or rotting in the bunch can be reduced. Under certain conditions, the fruit can survive until the soft ripe (rutab) or dry ripe (tamr) phase on the tree.

== Cultivation ==
In cultivation practices in tropical regions such as Thailand and Indonesia, planting of H-1 dates is often done using seeds from controlled pollination of the parent plantation (which is claimed to produce a fairly high percentage of female trees, around 70–80%) or through vegetative propagation such as offshoots and tissue culture. Because the date palm is a dioecious plant which has separate male and female trees, Manual artificial pollination is generally carried out by farmers to maximize the percentage of fertilization and fruit size on each bunch.

== See also ==
- Date palm
- List of date cultivars
- KL-1 (date)
