= KL-1 (date) =

Hybrid varieties of date palm

- Genus: Phoenix
- Species: Phoenix dactylifera
- Hybrid parentage: H-1 (further development)
- Cultivar: KL-1 (synonym: Kolak One, Maejo 36)
- Breeder: Sak Lamjuan (Maejo University)
- Origin: Thailand

KL-1 (also known as Kolak One or Maejo 36) is a cultivar or hybrid variety of date palm (Phoenix dactylifera) which was developed in Thailand to be able to adapt and produce optimal fruit in wet tropical climates. This cultivar is a cross between the Barhee and Deglet Nour varieties created by Thai plant breeder Sak Lamjuan.

Due to its early-growing nature (fast fruiting) and tolerance to high rainfall, KL-1 is one of the main varieties cultivated commercially in the Southeast Asia region, including Thailand, Malaysia, and Indonesia.

== History ==
The development of the KL-1 variety began with research efforts on date cultivation in Thailand's tropical climate, which has higher humidity and rainfall compared to the date palm's native habitat in the Middle East and North Africa. This cultivar was created by Sak Lamjuan (whose nickname is "Kolak"), a researcher at Maejo University, Chiang Mai, through a cross between the parent varieties Barhee and Deglet Nour. The name KL-1 itself is an abbreviation of the breeder's nickname, namely Kolak One.

== Morphological and fruit characteristics ==
The KL-1 cultivar has a number of agronomic characteristics that distinguish it from most subtropical date varieties:

- Plants propagated through seeds are able to start flowering and bearing fruit at the age of around 2.5 to 3 years after planting, when the tree trunk is still around 1 to 2 meters high.
- The KL-1 fruit is oval (elongated oval) with a bright yellow to reddish orange skin surface when it enters the young ripe phase (khalal).
- The flesh of the fruit is white, relatively thick with small/thin seeds. KL-1 fruit is generally harvested and consumed fresh in the khalal (unripe) phase because it has a crunchy texture resembling an apple, juicy, and tastes sweet with a touch of natural astringency. Chemically, the sugar composition of KL-1 fruit is dominated by monosaccharides (glucose and fructose) compared to disaccharides (sucrose).
- At the first harvest at around 3 years of age, one tree can produce around 5 to 8 bunches of fruit with an average weight of 5 to 10 kilograms per bunch.

== Cultivation and genetic research ==
Like date palms in general, KL-1 is a dioecious plant, meaning it has separate male and female trees. Generative propagation using seeds produces a varying ratio of male to female seedlings, while only female trees produce fruit (male trees are only needed in about 10% of the garden as a source of pollen).

To overcome the problem of determining the sex of seedlings early before the flowering period, A number of plant biotechnology studies—including in Thailand and Indonesia—have developed sex identification of KL-1 cultivar seedlings using DNA molecular markers such as RAPD (Random Amplified Polymorphic DNA), ISSR (Inter Simple Sequence Repeat), and SRY gene analysis. In Indonesia, the KL-1 cultivar is widely cultivated and its adaptation is being researched in various regions such as Aceh, West Sumatra, Riau, West Java, and East Java.

== See also ==
- Date palm
- Barhee
- Deglet Nour
- H-1 (date)
- List of date cultivars
