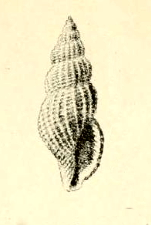
- Original image of a shell of Raphitoma papillosa

Scientific classification
- Kingdom: Animalia
- Phylum: Mollusca
- Class: Gastropoda
- Subclass: Caenogastropoda
- Order: Neogastropoda
- Superfamily: Conoidea
- Family: Raphitomidae
- Genus: Raphitoma
- Species: R. papillosa

Binomial name
- Raphitoma papillosa (Pallary, 1904)

Synonyms
- Clathurella papillosa (Pallary, 1904); Philbertia papillosa Pallary, 1904

= Raphitoma papillosa =

Species of mollusc

Raphitoma papillosa is a species of sea snail, a marine gastropod mollusk in the family Raphitomidae.

== Description ==
The length of the shell varies between 5 mm and 10 mm.

The elongated, fusiform shell has a pointed spire. The shell contains 7 convex whorls, of which two smooth whorls in the protoconch. They show many pronounced axial ribs and smaller decurrent, lamellar threads forming a reticulation with nodules. The suture is impressed. The body whorl measures more than half the length of the shell. The aperture is suboval. The columella is straight. The siphonal canal is wide and open. The outer lip is rounded and somewhat thickened and denticled inside. The sutural sinus is narrow and well-marked. The ground color of the shell is yellow on which the reticulation comes off in white.

== Distribution ==
Considered as endemic to the Gulf of Gabès, Tunisia, sporadic records from Lampedusa Island and Sardinia seem to witness a range wider than supposed. Conversely the records from northern Adriatic Sea is not deemed to be reliable.
