= Tozeur Governorate =

Governorate of Tunisia

Tozeur ولاية توزر
- Governorate
- Map of Tunisia with Tozeur highlighted

- Subdivisions of Tozeur Governorate
- Coordinates: 33°55′N 8°08′E
- Country: Tunisia
- Created: 21 June 1956
- Capital: Tozeur

Government
  - Governor: Chahine Zribi (since 2024)

Area
  - Total: 4,719 km^{2} (1,822 sq mi)
  - Rank: Ranked 11th of 24

Population (2019)
  - Total: 114,474
  - Rank: Ranked 24th of 24
  - Density: 24.26/km^{2} (62.83/sq mi)
- Time zone: UTC+01 (CET)
- Postal prefix: xx
- ISO 3166 code: TN-72

Tozeur (Tunisian Arabic: توزر Tauzar) is the westernmost of the 24 governorates (provinces) of Tunisia and as such bordering Algeria. It covers an area of 4,719 km^{2} and has a population of 107,912 (2014 census) making it the least populated province. The capital is Tozeur. Integrated into the governorate of Gafsa in November 1958, it was restored in April 1980.

== Geography ==
The Chott el Djerid occupies a large amount of the area with a larger part in Kebili and a small fraction in coastal Gabes province both to the east

The area is of low elevation, particularly its two large dry lakes occupying approximately 45% of its area. These are about a third of the Chott el Djerid, the country's largest inland body of water/salt pan and the Chott el Rhasa which has a small portion in Algeria. The lowest point is the bottom of the latter, 23 m below mean sea level. Tozeur and its airstrip are in the quite narrow strip of land between the two pans. Elevations reach above 200 m in the north east extreme being otherwise below 100 m. The uplands to the north attract variable winter and early spring relief precipitation and little other rain. The area exhibits a hot desert climate (Köppen climate classification BWh) with long, extremely hot summers throughout (see North-south graduation of Tunisian climatic zones) — the patchy and infrequent rainfall in winter is greater than the average for the Sahara Desert of which the area forms part.

=== Transport ===
One of four arterial roads into Algeria passes through Tozeur along a north-east to south-west axis and the town of Gafsa, a provincial capital to the north before heading due east towards the port and coastal resort city of Sfax. The other roads of the province are marked as minor, one passing via a long causeway through the Chott el Djerid leading directly to Kebili, Matmata and Medenine.

== Administrative divisions ==
The Tozeur Governorate is divided into five delegations (mutamadiyat), listed below with their populations at the 2004 and 2014 Censuses, and further divided into 36 sectors (imada).

Delegation	Area in km^{2}	Population 2004 Census	Population 2014 Census
Degache	1,419	26,596	28,543
Hazoua	1,288	4,162	4,700
Nefta	1,641	20,544	21,731
Tameghza	890	6,362	6,516
Tozeur	820	39,862	46,422

Five municipalities are in Tozeur Governorate:

6211	Tozeur	50,362
6212	Degache	24,426
6213	El Hamma du Jérid	7,895
6214	Nafta	24,263
6215	Tamerza	6,904
	Hazoua	6,186
