= Sahara Sea =

Engineering project to flood parts of the Sahara Desert with sea water

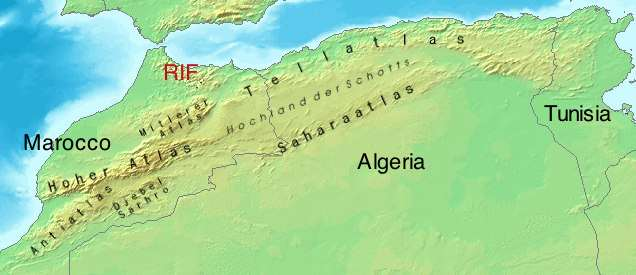
A relief map of northwestern North Africa

A relief map of Egypt, with the Qattara Depression shown in blue

The Sahara Sea was the name of a hypothetical macro-engineering project which proposed flooding endorheic basins in the Sahara with waters from the Atlantic Ocean or Mediterranean Sea. The goal of this unrealised project was to create an inland sea that would cover the substantial areas of the Sahara that lie below sea level, bringing humid air, rain, and agriculture deep into the desert.

The possibility of such a project was raised several times by different scientists and engineers during the late 19th century and early 20th century. The concept of a flooded Sahara was also featured in novels of the time. Countries regarding which such a project was discussed include Morocco, Algeria, Tunisia, and Egypt.

== History ==
=== 19th century ===
In 1877, the Scottish entrepreneur and abolitionist Donald Mackenzie was the first to propose the creation of a Sahara Sea. Mackenzie's idea was to cut a channel from one of the sand-barred lagoons north of Cape Juby, south to a large plain which Arab traders had identified to him as El Djouf. Mackenzie believed this vast region was up to 61 metres (200 ft) below sea level and that flooding it would create an inland sea of 155,400 square kilometres (60,000 sq mi) suited to commercial navigation and even agriculture. He further believed that geological evidence suggested this basin had once been connected to the Atlantic via a channel near the Saguia el-Hamra. He proposed that this inland sea, if augmented with a canal, could provide access to the Niger River and the markets and rich resources of West Africa.

There are several small depressions in the vicinity of Cape Juby; at 55 m below sea level, the Sebkha Tah is the lowest and largest. But it covers less than 250 km² and is 500 km north of the geographical area identified as El Djouf (also known as the Majabat al-Koubra) which has an average elevation of 320m.

Mackenzie never travelled in this area, but he had read of other sub-sea level desert basins in present-day Tunisia, Algeria, and Egypt similar to those found near Cape Juby. These basins contain seasonally dry salt lakes, known as chotts or sebkhas.

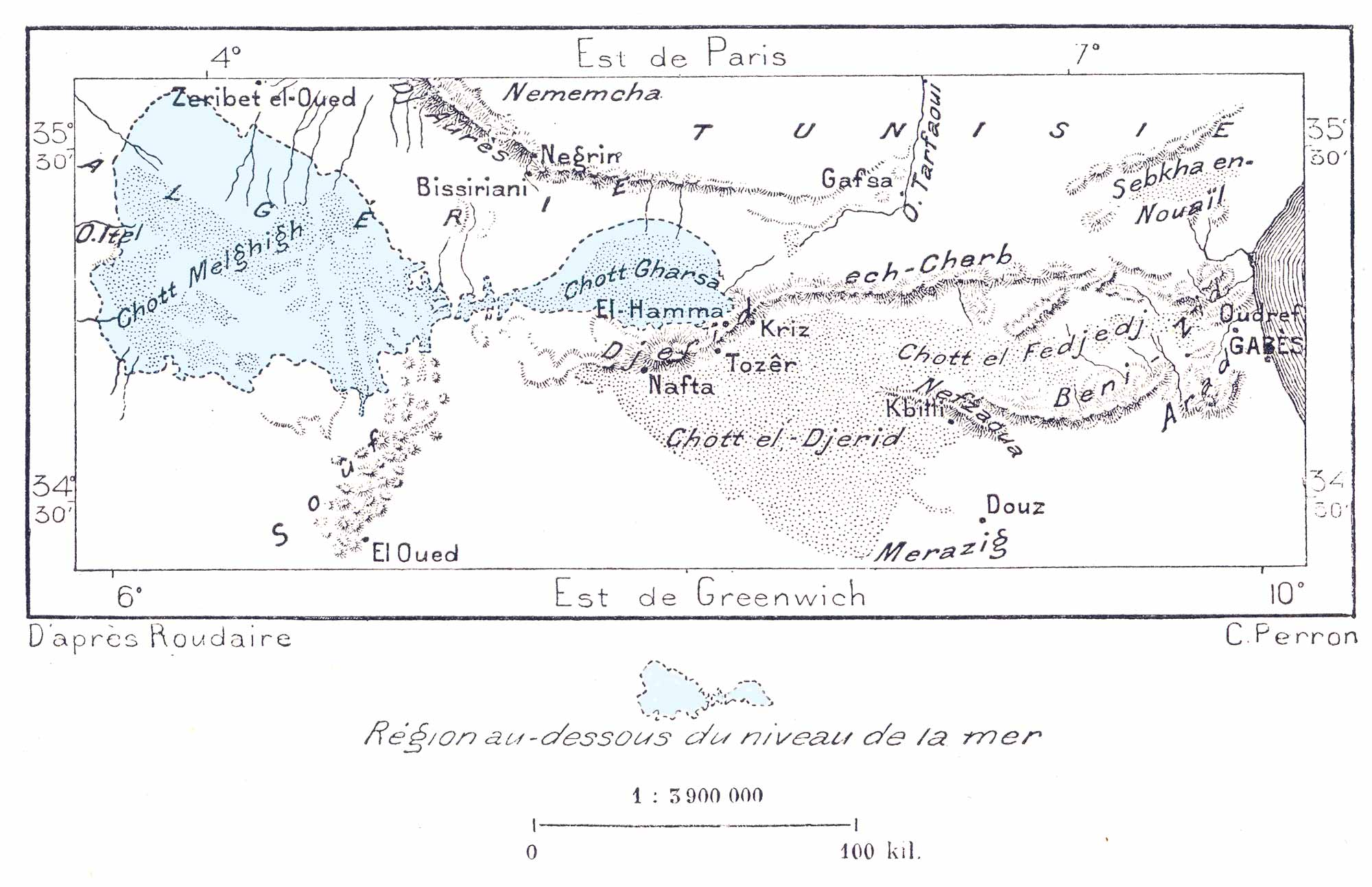
Map of Tunisia illustrating the area of Roudaire's proposed Sahara Sea

François Elie Roudaire, a French geographer, and Ferdinand de Lesseps, a diplomat influential in the creation of the Suez Canal, proposed this area for the creation of an inland sea in 1878. Roudaire and de Lesseps proposed that a channel be cut from the Gulf of Gabès in the Mediterranean to the Chott el Fejej which would allow the sea to drain into these basins. They were not specific in the area such a sea would cover (although subsequent analyses suggested that it would be considerably smaller than Mackenzie's proposal at only 8,000 square kilometres (3,100 sq mi) in area), but argued that the new inland sea would improve the quality of weather on the European continent. The estimated cost of the Roudaire project was $30,000,000 at the time.

While Roudaire and de Lesseps were optimistic about the weather effects that such an inland sea would produce in Europe, others were not as hopeful. Alexander William Mitchinson argued that flooding substantial areas would create disease-ridden swamps. Others were critical of the feasibility of the project or the proposal to join the sea at El Djouf with the sea in what is now Tunisia and Algeria. The project was ultimately rejected by the French Government and funding was withdrawn when surveys revealed that many areas were not below sea level as had been believed.

=== 20th century ===
The proposal to create a Sahara Sea was revived in the early 1900s by French professor Edmund Etchegoyen. Around 1910, Etchegoyen proposed that a longer and deeper channel could be constructed. He argued that such a sea could be a boon for colonisation and could potentially produce an inland sea half the size of the Mediterranean. This proposal was considered by the French government but also rejected. Critics noted that, while some parts of the Sahara were indeed below sea level, much of the Sahara was above sea level. This, they said, would produce an irregular sea of bays and coves; it would also be considerably smaller than estimates by Etchegoyen suggested.

Map of the Qattara Depression illustrating the proposed routes of canals or tunnels linking it to the Mediterranean.

The Qattara Depression Project proposed to flood the Qattara Depression in Egypt, producing hydroelectricity and allowing for future salt mining. Discussed as early as 1912, the idea was considered periodically throughout the 20th and early 21st centuries.

Operation Plowshare was an American idea to use nuclear explosives in civil engineering projects such as the Qattara Depression Project. It was also suggested that nuclear explosives might be detonated to create a channel from the Mediterranean to the chotts of Tunisia. This proposal was abandoned, however, with the signing of various treaties prohibiting peaceful nuclear explosions.

=== 21st century ===
The project regained steam in the mid 2010s with the creation of the association Cooperation Road which in 2018 obtained the approval of the Tunisian government.

== Appearances in literature ==
The notion of a Sahara Sea has been featured several times in literature, most notably in Jules Verne's last novel, Invasion of the Sea, which directly referred to the plan of Roudaire and de Lesseps. The idea of a flooded Sahara also occurs in The Secret People by John Wyndham. In "The Man Who Rocked the Earth" (1915), a man who has harnessed nuclear power blasts through the Atlas Mountains to flood the Sahara.

In the 2018 film Aquaman, the Sahara was once a sea inhabited by an Atlantean tribe.

== Other desert flooding projects ==
Since the late 19th century there have been proposals to connect Lake Eyre in the South Australian desert to the ocean via canal.

In 1905, engineers working on an irrigation canal in southern California accidentally released the waters of the Colorado River into a formerly dry basin, creating a large saline lake known as the Salton Sea. Although the lake has shrunk considerably since its creation, it remains the largest lake in the state of California.
