= Djerid =

One of the six geographical and economic regions of Tunisia

Coordinates: 33°54′58″N 8°00′24″E

Djerid الجريد
- Natural region
- Jerid
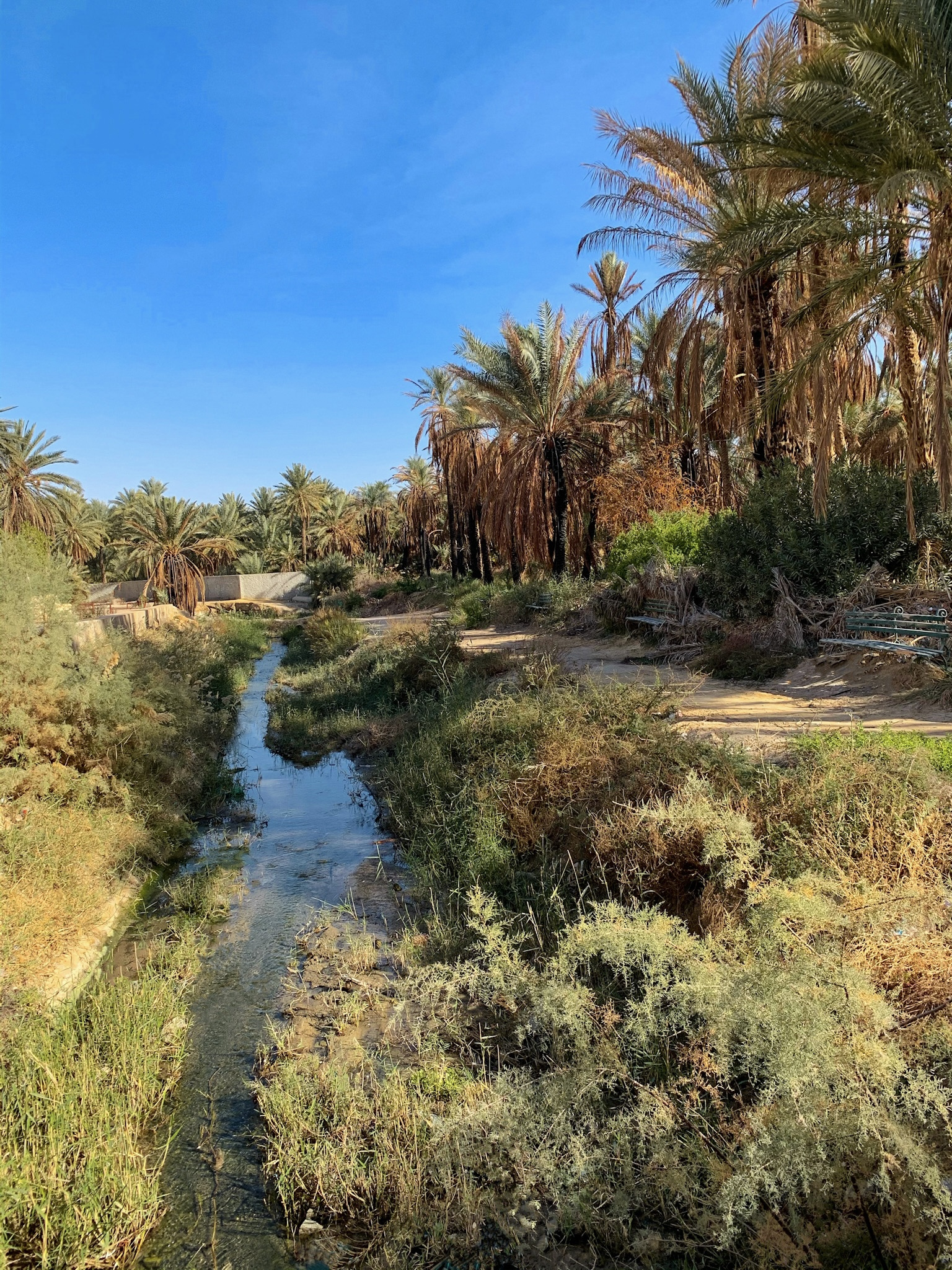
- Oasis and Palm trees in Tozeur with a valley - Dec 2020

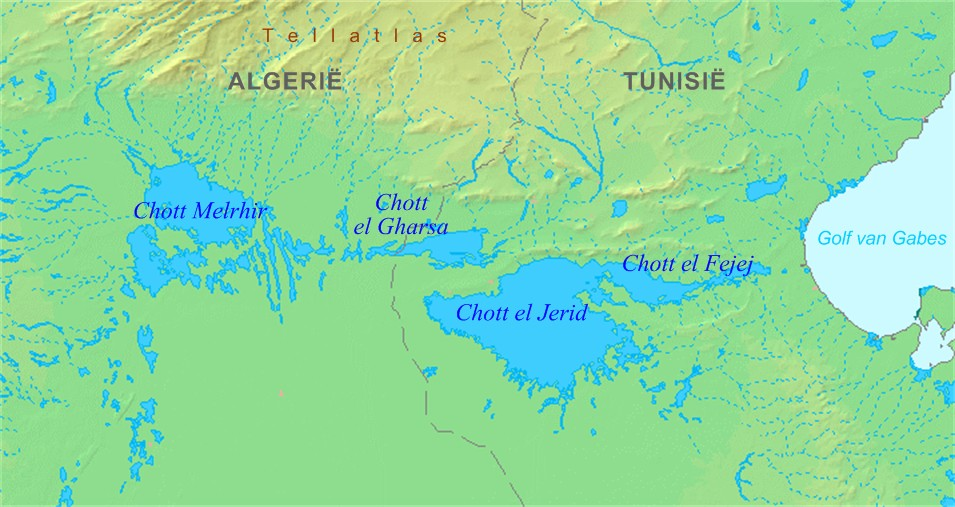
- Map of the Chott el Djerid area
- Country: Algeria, Libya and Tunisia
- Demonym(s): Jrīdī, Jrīdīya

el-Djerid, also al-Jarīd, (Arabic: الجريد; Derja: Jrīd; lit. 'Palm leaf') or more precisely the South Western Tunisia Region is a semi-desert natural region comprising three southern Tunisian Governorates, Gafsa, Kebili and Tozeur with adjacent parts of Algeria and Libya.

== Geography ==
The region is characterised by bare pink hills with oases and several chotts (salt pans) such as Chott el Djerid in Tunisia. Economically the area is important for phosphate mining. Major towns include Gafsa and Tozeur.

It remains the principal center of Ibāḍism in North Africa, with remaining Ibāḍī communities on Djerba in Tunisia, in the M'zab in Algeria, and in Jabal Nafusa in Libya. In medieval times, it often formed a politically separate entity under the control of Ibāḍī imams.

== Location ==
Jerid, Djerid or Bled el Djerid (Arabic : الجريد, literally "palm leaf"), is a semi-desert region situated in southwestern Tunisia, which extends to the contiguous areas of Algeria.

In administrative terms, it is associated in Tunisia with the province (governorate) of Tozeur and, at least in part and according to some sources, also the province of Gafsa and Kebili. The latter is part of the Nefzaoua region, which is sometimes considered part of Jerid.

The region is dotted with oases scattered between two chotts (largely dry salt lakes most of the time). Among the chotts stands out Chott el Jerid. In economic terms, the region stands out for its production of dates, namely the superior deglet nour variety, and since the 1990s tourism has gained importance. There is also the mining of phosphate deposits, mainly in the north of the region (Gafsa).

== History ==
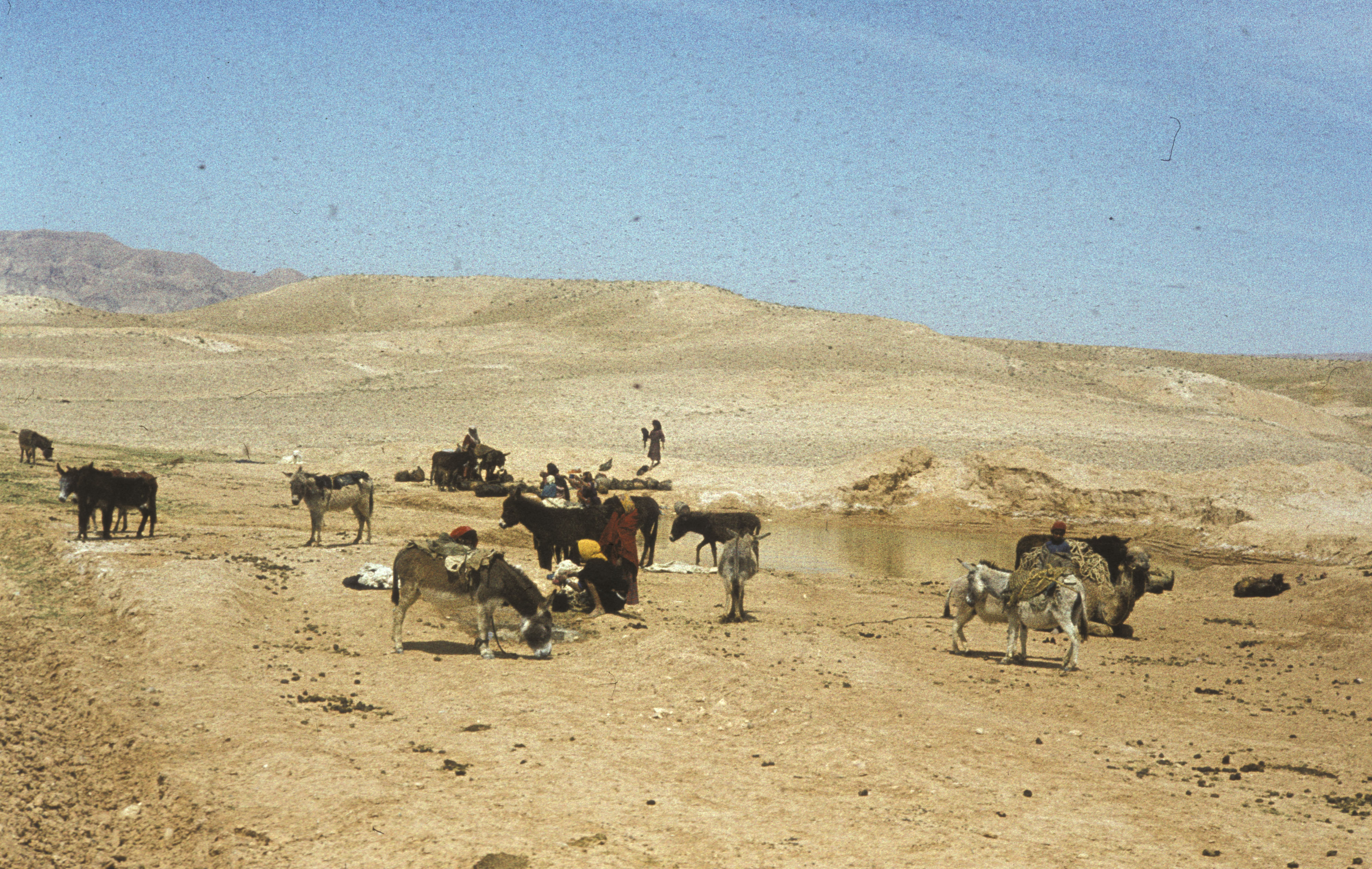
Jerid region in 1960

The Jerid was already inhabited by the Numidians before the arrival of the Romans in the 3rd century BC. Then came the Romans, who erected fortifications, integrated in the limes of the southern border of the province of Proconsular Africa, whose purpose was to prevent the incursions of the nomadic populations of the Sahara.

With the arrival of Christianity, the region hosted two episcopal sees, one in Thusurus (Tozeur) and one in Nepte (Nefta). After a fleeting passage of the Vandals in the 5th century AD, the rule of the Byzantines continued until the invasion of the Muslim Arabs of the Umayyad Empire in the 7th century, who occupied all of Tunisia and Arabized and Islamized. During the Middle Ages, Jerid had remarkable economic progress, mainly due to the strategic position in the caravan routes that connected the Mediterranean Basin to sub-Saharan Africa. Until the 11th century, the trade routes and movement of gold were managed by Ibadi Arabs of the Djarid. Among the "goods" transported were numerous slaves, who were bought to work in the oases. During the Ottoman period, the region was the scene of revolts against high taxes and nomadic incursions. The relative decline of the region since that time is due in large part to the loss of the strategic and economic importance of the trans-Saharan trade.

Biledulgerid was a term used in early European maps for the Maghreb south of the Atlas Mountains.

== Population ==
The population of the province of Tozeur, the central nucleus of the region, was estimated at 104,800 inhabitants in 2011, 4.5% more than in 2007 and 7.5% more than in 2004, concentrating mainly on the cities of Tozeur and Nefta. In the same year it was estimated that Gafsa province to the north would have 341,600 inhabitants, 3.5% more than in 2007 and 5.5% more than in 2004. The estimate for the province of Kebili in the south, Which many authors do not include in the region, was then of 152 200 inhabitants, 3.9% more than in 2007 and 6.3% more than in 2004.

In ethnic terms, the population results from the intermarriage of native Berbers, Arabs, and slaves from sub-Saharan Africa.

== Economy ==
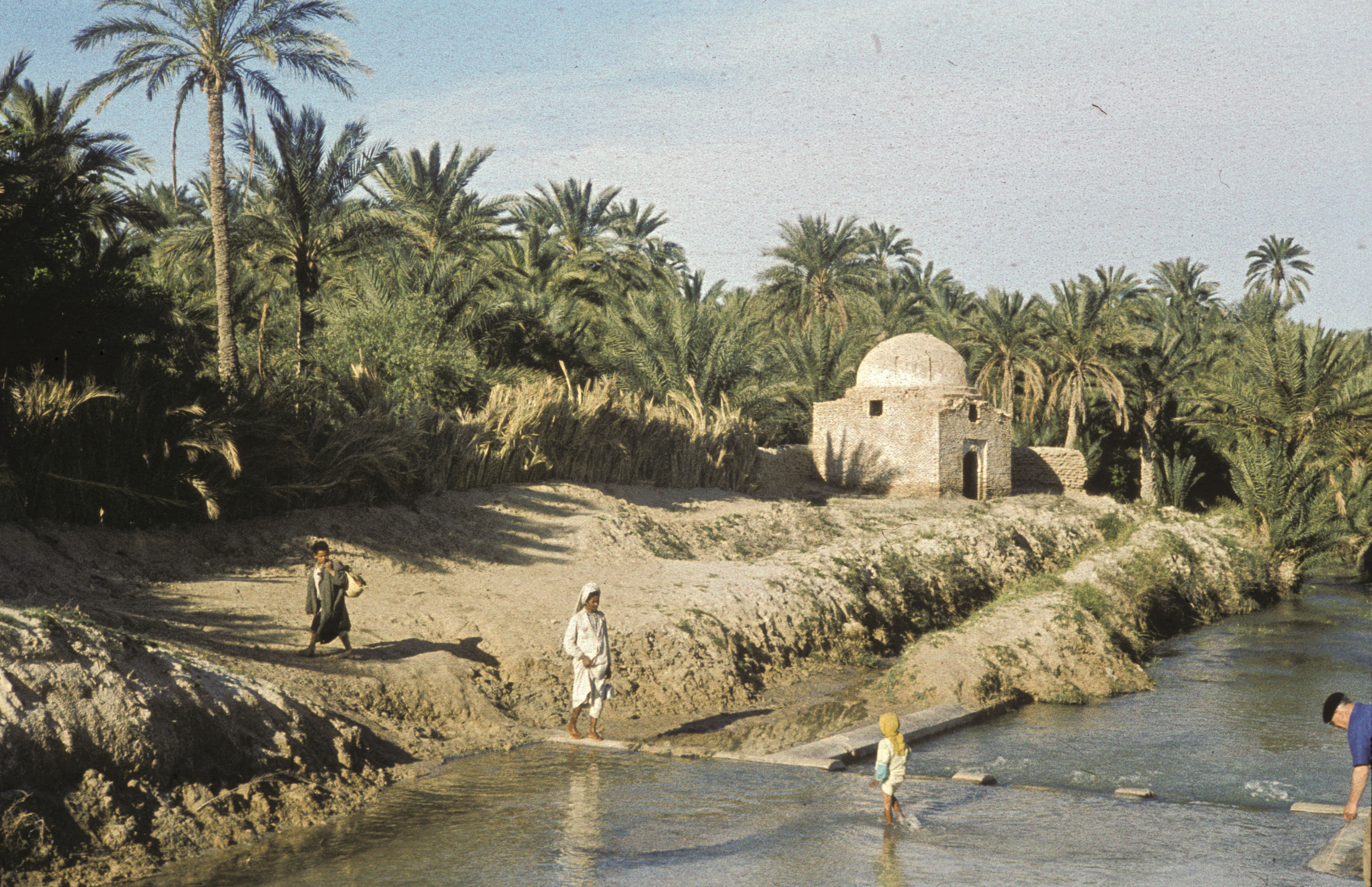
The oasis of Tozeur in 1960

Jerid has about 1.6 million date palms and is one of Tunisia's most important date-producing regions, especially the most valuable variety, deglet nour. Considering the wider version of Jerid, about 85% of Tunisia's total production of dates comes from the region, which in 2010-2011 produced almost 150,000 tonnes. In the same year, only 0.2% of the deglet nour variety was produced outside the region. Whereas the province of Kebili is not part of Jerid, the percentages fall to about 30% of the total and also 30% of deglet nour, which corresponds respectively to 52,125 and 36,050 tonnes. Despite extreme weather conditions - maximum temperatures are close to 50 °C and annual precipitations are very limited (between 80 and 120 mm) - the Jerid oases are very productive due to their resources in waters currently extracted from very deep underground aquifers through modern bore holes.

== See also ==
- Ifriqiya
- Maghreb
