= Nefta, Tunisia =

Nefta نفطة
- Oasis Town
- Nefta
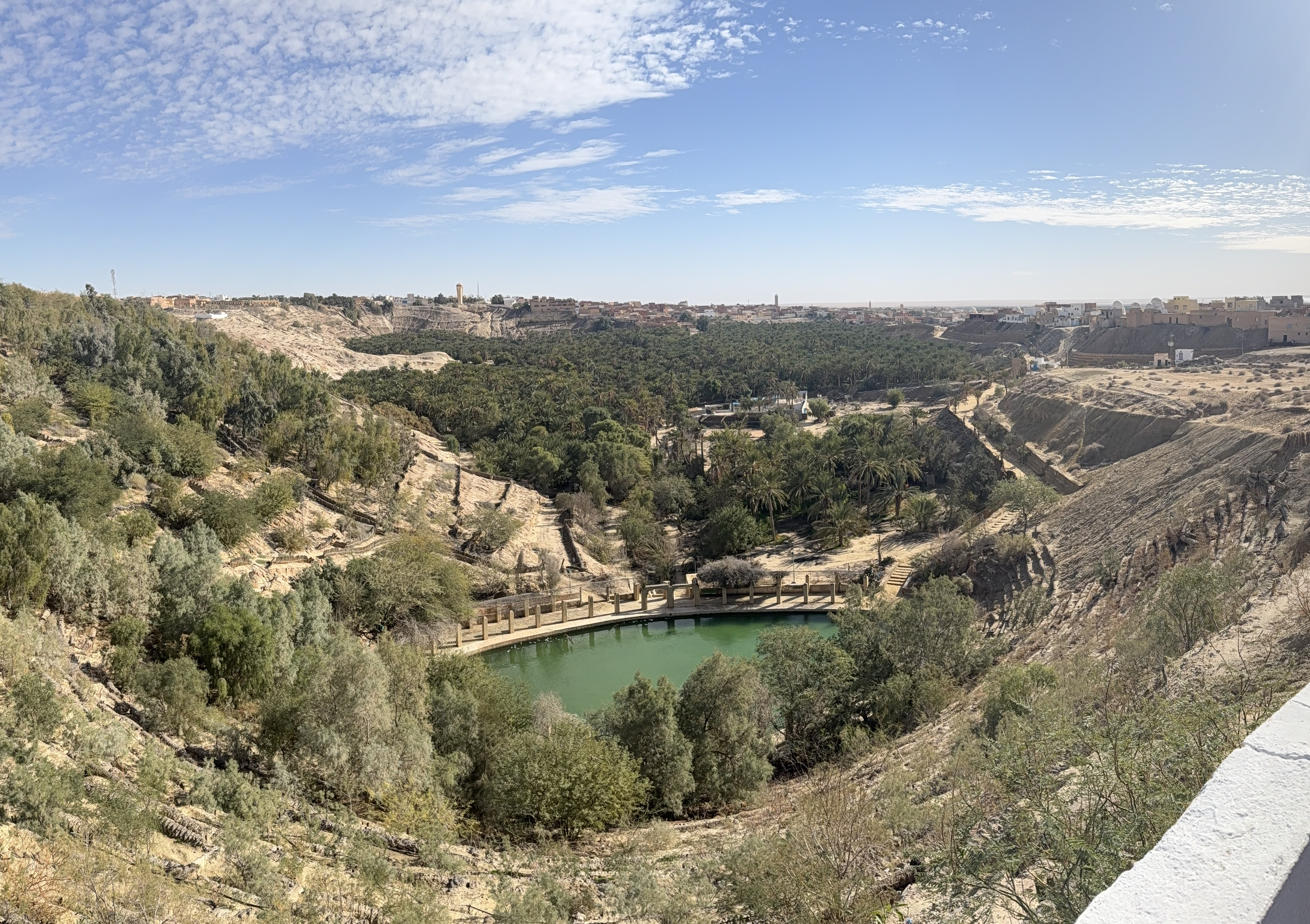
- The original oasis of Nefta is known as "the basket" as it is located down the hills
- Nickname: Little Kufa
- Location within Tunisia
- Coordinates: 33°53′N 7°53′E
- Country: Tunisia
- Governorate: Tozeur Governorate
- Elevation: 55 m (180 ft)

Population (2022)
  - Total: 22,745
- Time zone: CET

Nefta (or Naftah) is a Tunisian municipality and an oasis in Tozeur Governorate north of the Chott el Djerid.

== Religious significance ==
Nefta is considered by most Sufis to be the spiritual home of Sufism, a mystical branch of Islam; many religious buildings are located in the district El Bayadha. Nefta is a pilgrimage center to which pilgrims travel throughout the year. There is a Folk Festival in April and a Date Festival in November/December.

Nefta is the religious center of the Bled el Djerid, the "Land of Palms", with more than 24 mosques and 100 marabouts. The marabouts still attract pilgrims from all over southern Tunisia and even from Algeria. This great veneration of the marabouts reflects the continuing vigor of Sufism, the movement which grew up in the 12th century around Sufi Abu Madian (d. 1197). The name of the Sufis came from the simple woolen garment (suf) they wore. They believed that the adherents of Islam, a religion of the desert, should show particular modesty of behavior and asceticism, and were much given to mysticism, the veneration of holy men, spiritual contemplation and meditation. Sufism is also marked by religious forms taken over from the pre-Islamic, animistic religions of the Berber population which orthodox Islam seeks to repress - belief in spirits, witchcraft, fortune-telling, the efficacy of amulets, etc. Regional variants of Sufism were propagated by holy men, who frequently founded their own brotherhoods, with centers for the teaching of disciples. They are credited with numerous miracles and revered for their holiness, and their tombs (marabouts) are places of pilgrimage, attracting varying numbers of pilgrims according to their reputation. In the past these holy men were also appealed to as judges in the conflicts which frequently occurred between the nomadic tribes and the settled population of the oases. Nefta is the last stronghold of this Sufism, and is sometimes called, with some justification, the "Kairouan of the South". The marabouts venerated here are scattered about throughout the old town of Nefta and the oasis.

During the Roman Empire the town then known as Nepte was the seat of a Christian bishopric, which functioned till the end of the 7th century.

== The town ==
The town has been mentioned in historical sources since the late Umayyad rule as one of the four metropolitan cities of Castillia. In the 9th century, Ya'qubi wrote: "The cities of Castillia are four, situated in a vast land of palm and olive trees. The great city is Tozeur, where the workers reside; the second is Hamma, the third Thiges, and the fourth Nefta."

Nefta is divided into two parts by a small oued and a depression at its northern end. To the east of the oued is the new town, with the old souk quarter at its southwestern corner; to the west, on the slopes of a hill, is the old town. The main road from Tozeur runs through the new town as Avenue Habib Bourguiba, which then crosses the oued and skirts the old town. At its western end a street branches off on the right, ascends the hill, goes round the old town and the sand-bowl, and returns to Avenue Habib Bourguiba. Nefta is a town of cube-shaped, flat-roofed houses huddled closely together, with Tozeur-style decoration. In some of the streets the upper stories of the houses, borne on round- headed arches, project over the street, forming a kind of tunnel which offers protection from the sun. It is planned to restore the old town in the very near future.

== History ==
Nefta is believed to have been settled originally by shepherds who came from the kingdom of Napata. The Romans and later the Byzantines built forts in the oasis (Nepte) to provide protection against raids by desert nomads. In Byzantine times Nefta and Tozeur were episcopal sees. In the mid-7th century Nefta was conquered by the Arabs and, in spite of fierce resistance, converted to Islam. A Christian community was however recorded as late as 1194.

In subsequent centuries Nefta prospered as an important staging-point for caravans (for a time the most important in Tunisia). Its decline began in the 15th century as a result of more frequent raids by nomadic tribes and the general falling off in the caravan trade. With the coming of the French in 1881, however, Nefta experienced a renewal.

The salt-flats near Nefta were used as a filming location for the Star Wars movies in the late 20th century. During the film's construction, the directors chose the town to host Luke Skywalker's house.

== In popular culture ==
- In a posthumously published poem by Letitia Elizabeth Landon, written to illustrate Allom's picture (in the Gallery below) in Fisher's Drawing Room Scrap Book, 1841, she writes of a little azure sparrow 'peculiar to the district', which must not be harmed on pain of dire retribution.
- Several scenes of the French movie La Vérité si je Mens! 2, produced by Thomas Gilou and released in 2001, were shot in Nefta.

== Gallery ==
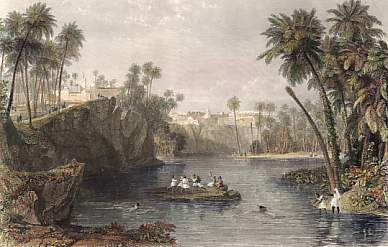
Steel engraving drawn by Thomas Allom, engraved by Thomas Higham. 1851

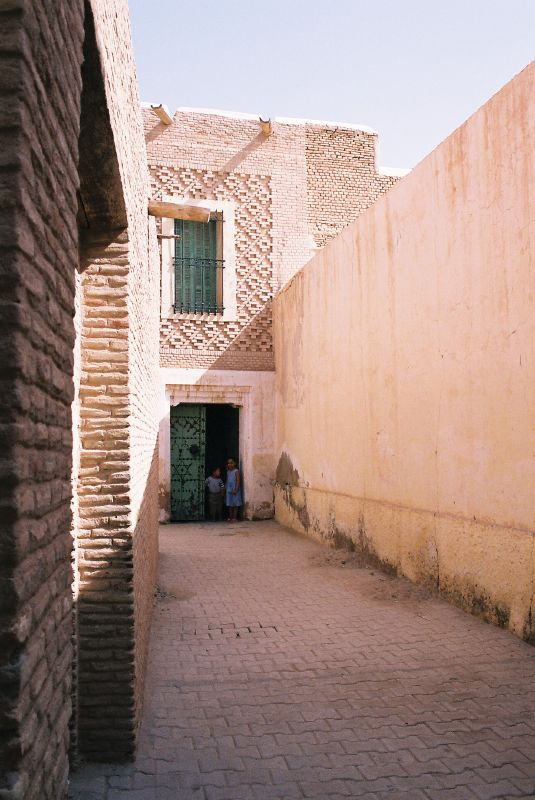
The old city of Nefta

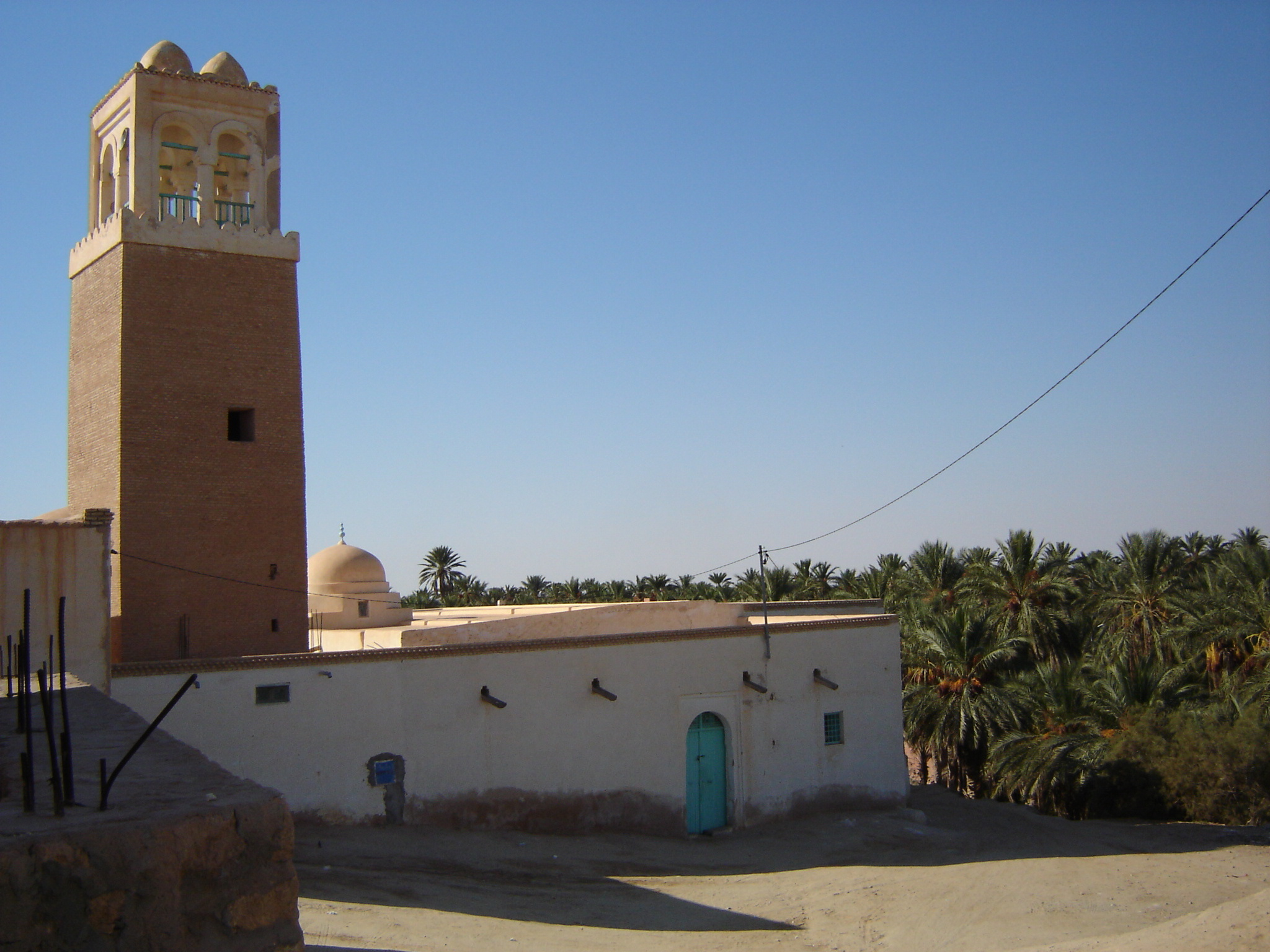
Mosque in Nefta

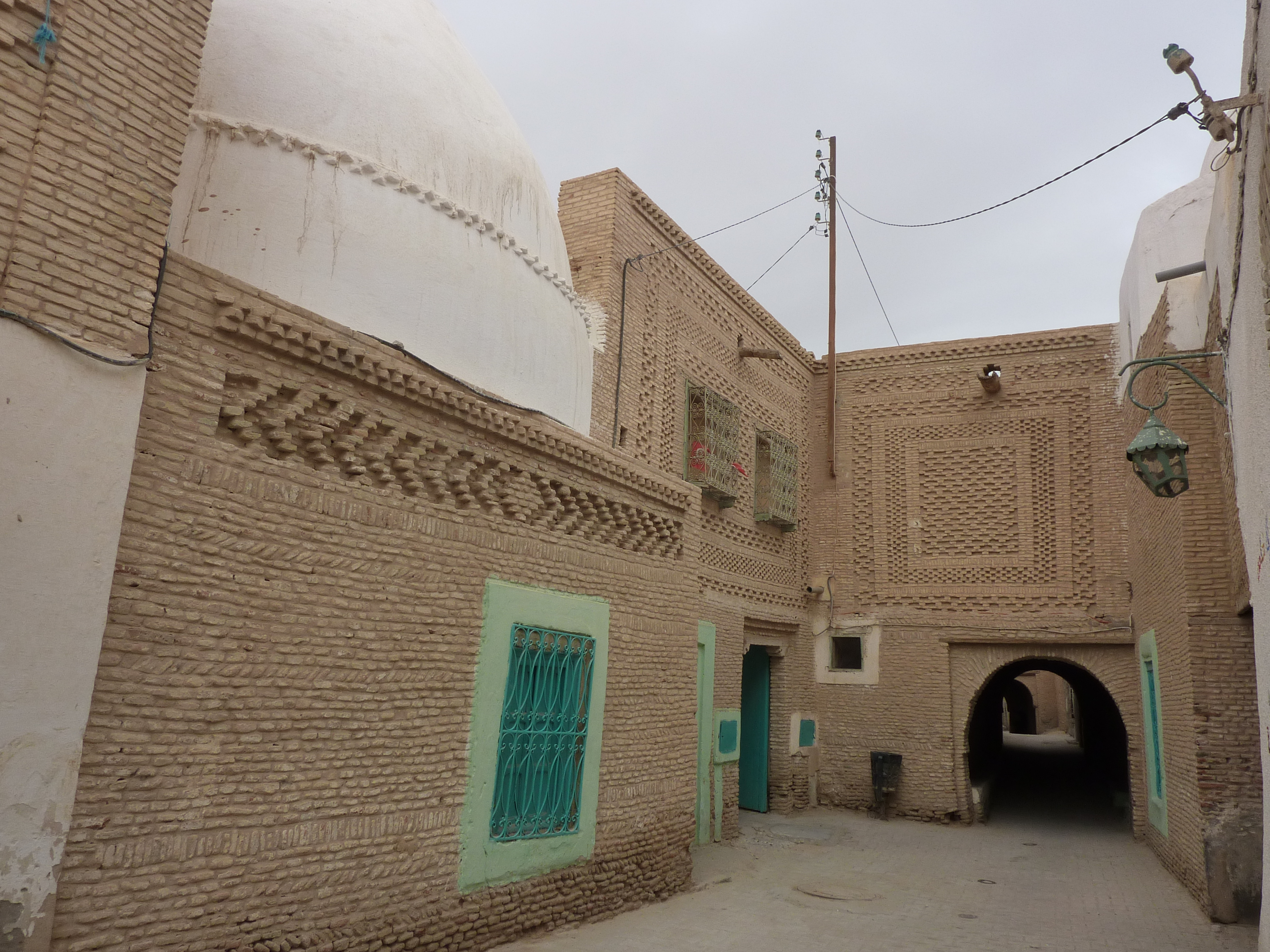
The old town of Nefta

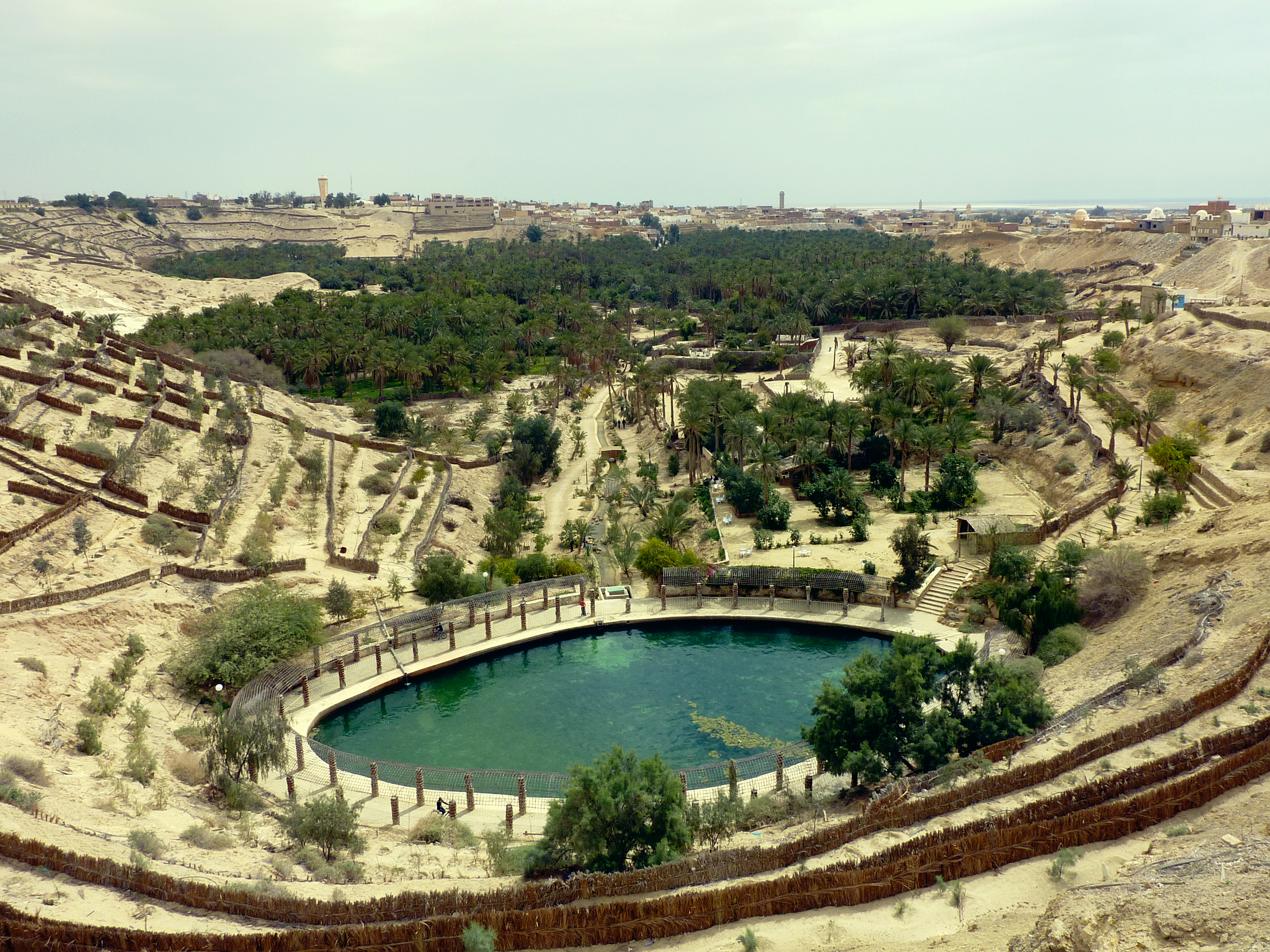
The Corbeille (Basket) in Nefta in 2012.

== Access ==
Nefta lies on GP 3 (Gafsa–Nefta), 25 km southwest of Tozeur (airport; regular services to and from Tunis, Monastir, and Djerba) and 113 km southwest of Gafsa. From the bus station (Gare Routière) in Avenue Habib Bourguiba, there are regular bus services to Tozeur and Gafsa and a once-daily service to Douz and Hazaoua, the frontier post for the crossing into Algeria. The 4 km from there to the frontier must be done either on foot or in a louage (communal taxi). From the Algerian frontier post there are buses to El Oued.
