= Barhee =

Soft cultivar date palm

- Genus: Phoenix
- Species: Phoenix dactylifera
- Hybrid parentage: KL-1 (hybridized with Deglet Nour)
- Origin: Basra, Iraq

Barhee (also spelled Barhi; Arabic: برحي; Persian: برحی) is a soft cultivar date palm (Phoenix dactylifera) native to the Basra region of Iraq. The name Barhee comes from the Arabic word barh meaning 'hot wind', referring to the summer wind that blows in the Persian Gulf region and southern Iraq.

Unlike most other commercial date varieties which are generally consumed only after they are fully ripe and dry, Barhee dates are known for their very low tannin content from the young phase so they can be consumed at all three stages of ripeness.

== History and distribution ==
The Barhee cultivar was first cultivated around Basra, Iraq, and spread widely to the surrounding areas, especially in Khuzestan Province (such as Abadan and Ahvaz), Iran. In 1913, Barhee date palm seedlings were officially imported from Basra to California, United States, and began to be cultivated commercially in the Coachella Valley region.

Apart from the Middle East and the United States, Barhee is one of the few date cultivars that can adapt and bear fruit well in wet tropical climates, such as Indonesia and Thailand. In tropical areas, the fruit is harvested early in the ripe phase (khalal) before the rainy season arrives so that it is protected from rotting due to high humidity.

== Characteristics ==
A mature Barhee date palm can reach a height of between 5 and 10 meters depending on garden maintenance techniques. The fruit is round to short oval in shape with a length of about 2–4 cm, a diameter of 2–3 cm, and an average weight of about 8 grams per fruit.

The main characteristic of Barhee dates lies in the change in texture and taste at each ripening phase:

- Khalal (half-cooked/yellow): At this early stage (in Persian it is called khārak/خارک), The skin of the fruit is bright yellow, has a crisp and juicy texture resembling an apple or an Asian pear, and has a mild sweet taste without the astringency that is generally found in unripe date varieties.
- Rutab (soft ripe/yellowish brown): When incubated at room temperature, the skin of the fruit changes color to yellow-brown to ripe sapodilla. The flesh becomes very soft, juicy and has a creamy texture with a taste resembling caramel and honey.
- Tamr (fully ripe/dark brown): In the final drying stage, the skin of the fruit shrivels and turns dark brown. It has a very sweet taste with a chewy texture, although Barhee dates are rarely marketed in the tamr form because the flesh is very soft and susceptible to damage during packaging.

== Cultivation ==
Modern propagation of Barhee date palms is generally carried out using tissue culture techniques to ensure genetic uniformity, disease resistance, and faster root growth compared to conventional propagation using offshoots. Plants from tissue culture generally start to bear fruit around 5 years after planting. In the practice of artificial pollination, pollen from male trees of the Ghannami variety (Ghannami Red and Ghannami Green) often used because it produces a high fertilization success rate.

== See also ==
- Date palm
- List of date cultivars
- Medjool
- Deglet Nour
