= Deglet Nour =

Date cultivar

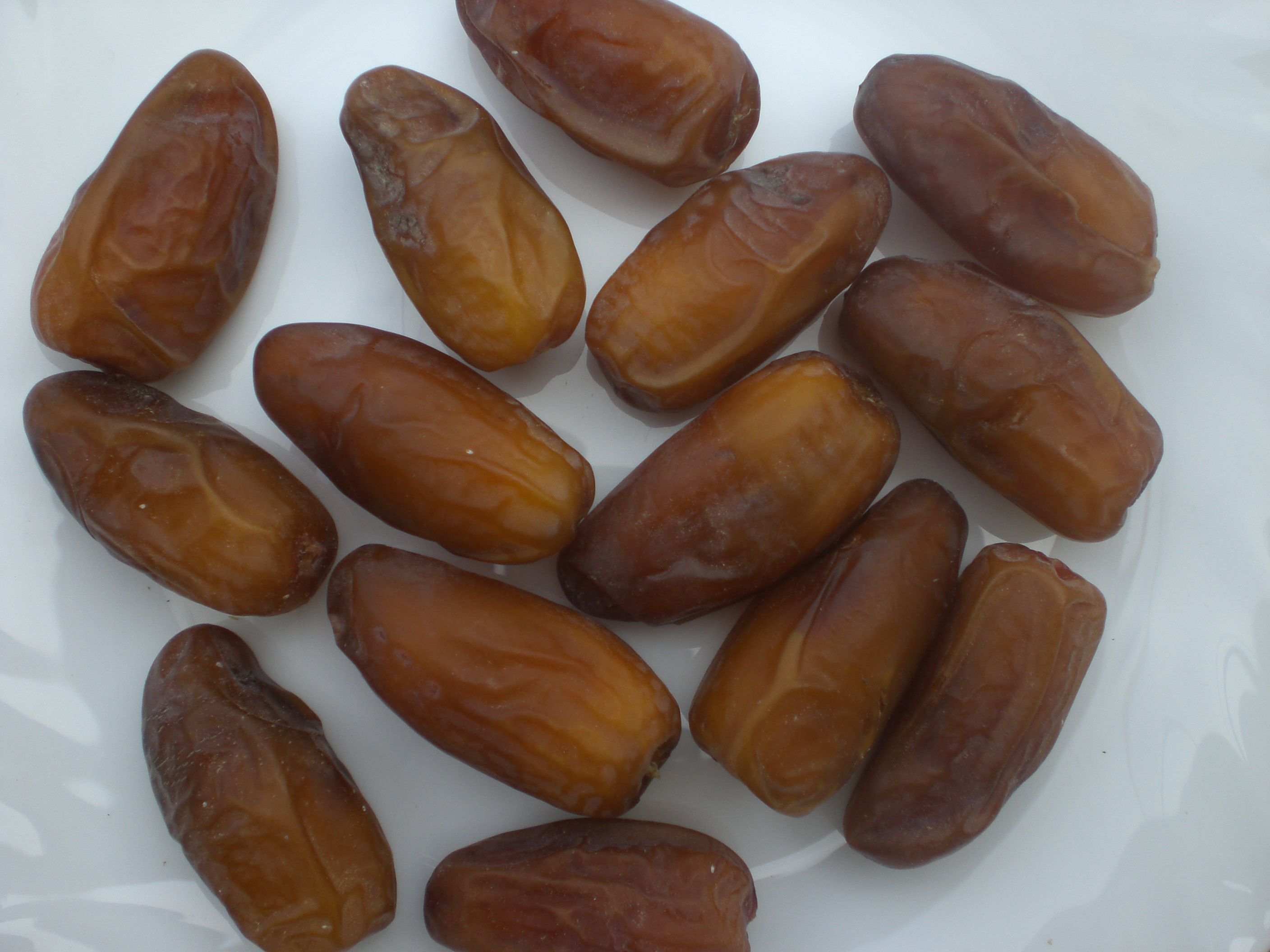
- Genus: Phoenix
- Species: Phoenix dactylifera
- Hybrid parentage: KL-1 (hybridized with Barhee)
- Origin: Tolga, Algeria

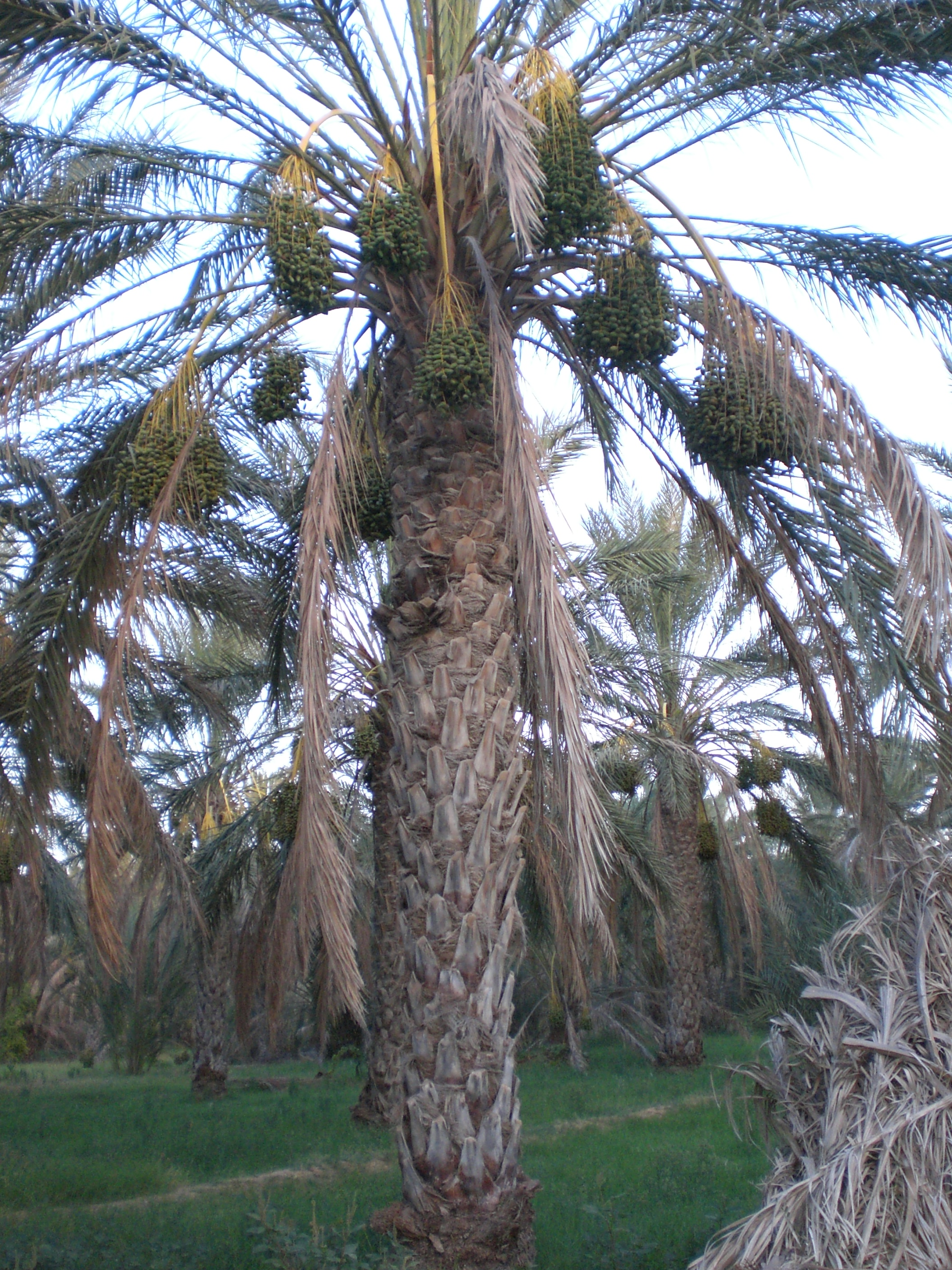
Palm tree in an oasis in Kebili, Tunisia

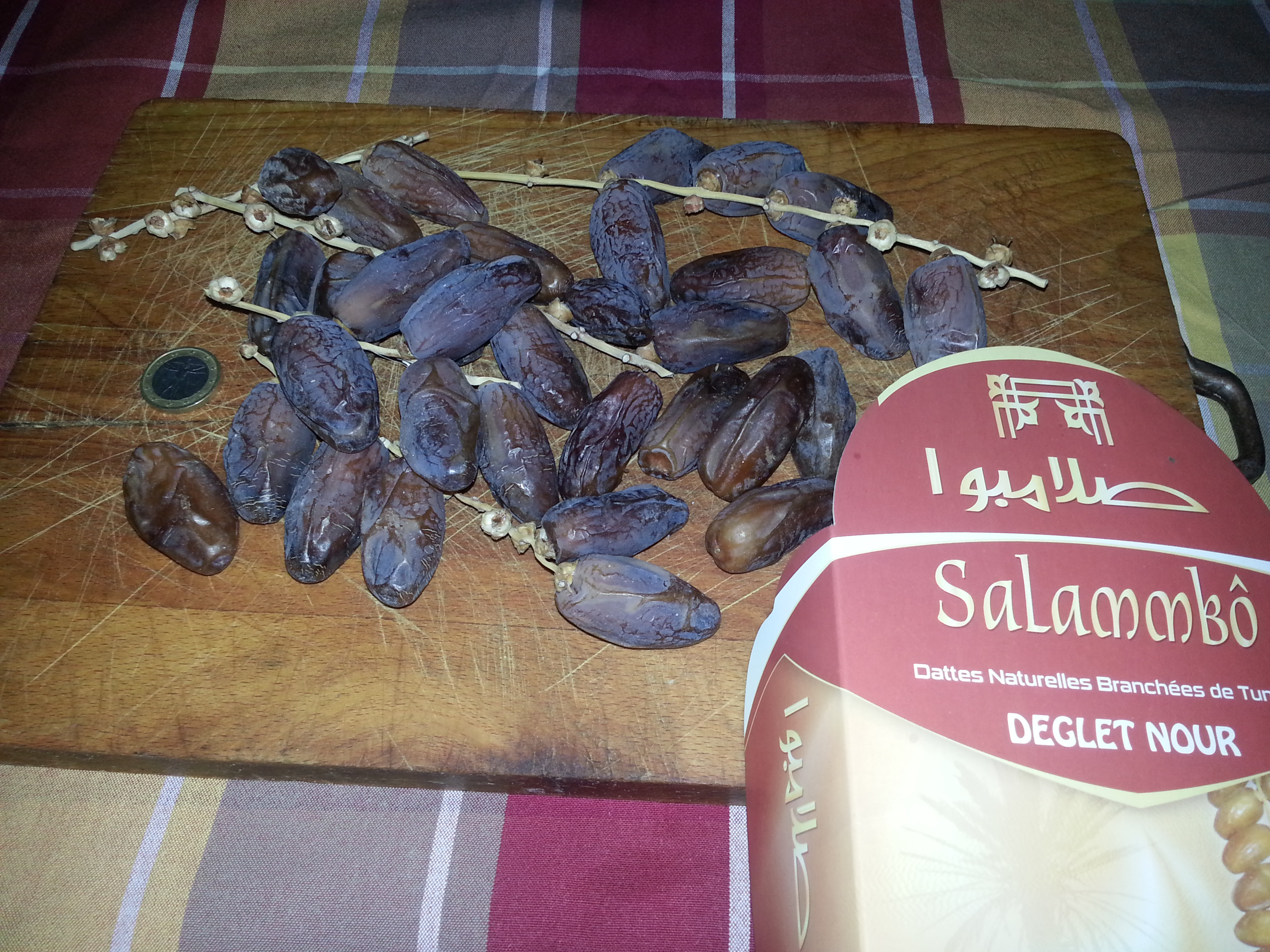
Deglet Nour dates

Deglet Nour, also spelled Deglet Noor, (Note: Algerian Arabic: دقلة نور; Standard Arabic: دَقَلَة النُور, romanized: daqalat an-nūr, lit. 'date palm of light' or 'heavenly date palm'; from Classical Arabic دَقَل daqal, a kind of date palm.) is a cultivar of the date palm that originated in the oasis of Tolga in Algeria. The cultivar has a soft touch, a translucent light color and a honey-like taste.

Deglet Nour seedlings have been exported to Libya, the United States and Tunisia, where they are grown in inland oases and are the chief export cultivar. Sugar rationing during World War II helped the Deglet Nours grow in popularity in the US as a candy replacement. Deglet Nour is the leading date in terms of export value according to the United Nations Food and Agriculture Organization.

== Origins ==
Several old works provide evidence that the Deglet Nour date was first grown in Algeria. Among them are Le palmier-dattier (The Date-Palm) by Pierre Munier, L'Algérie: un siècle de colonisation française (Algeria: A Century of French Colonization) by Félix Falck, Un voyage au pays des dattes (A Trip to the Land of Dates) by Jean-Henri Fabre, and le Bulletin de la Société botanique de France (Bulletin of the French Botanical Society). Munier states that the fruit was introduced at the end of the 13th century and the beginning of the 14th century from the oasis of Tolga to the neighboring areas of Biskra and Oued Righ in Algeria, before being brought to Tunisia at the end of the 17th century by a grower from Tozeur named Sidi Touati.

The Algerian Ministry of Agriculture reserves commercial usage of the Deglet Nour label for Algerian dates.

== Production ==
Deglet Nour dates are grown mainly in Algeria (Tolga, Oued Righ), in Tunisia (in the areas of Jérid and Nefzaoua), and in the United States (in California, Arizona and Texas), where the cultivar was brought at the beginning of the 20th century.
