= Shatt al Gharsah =

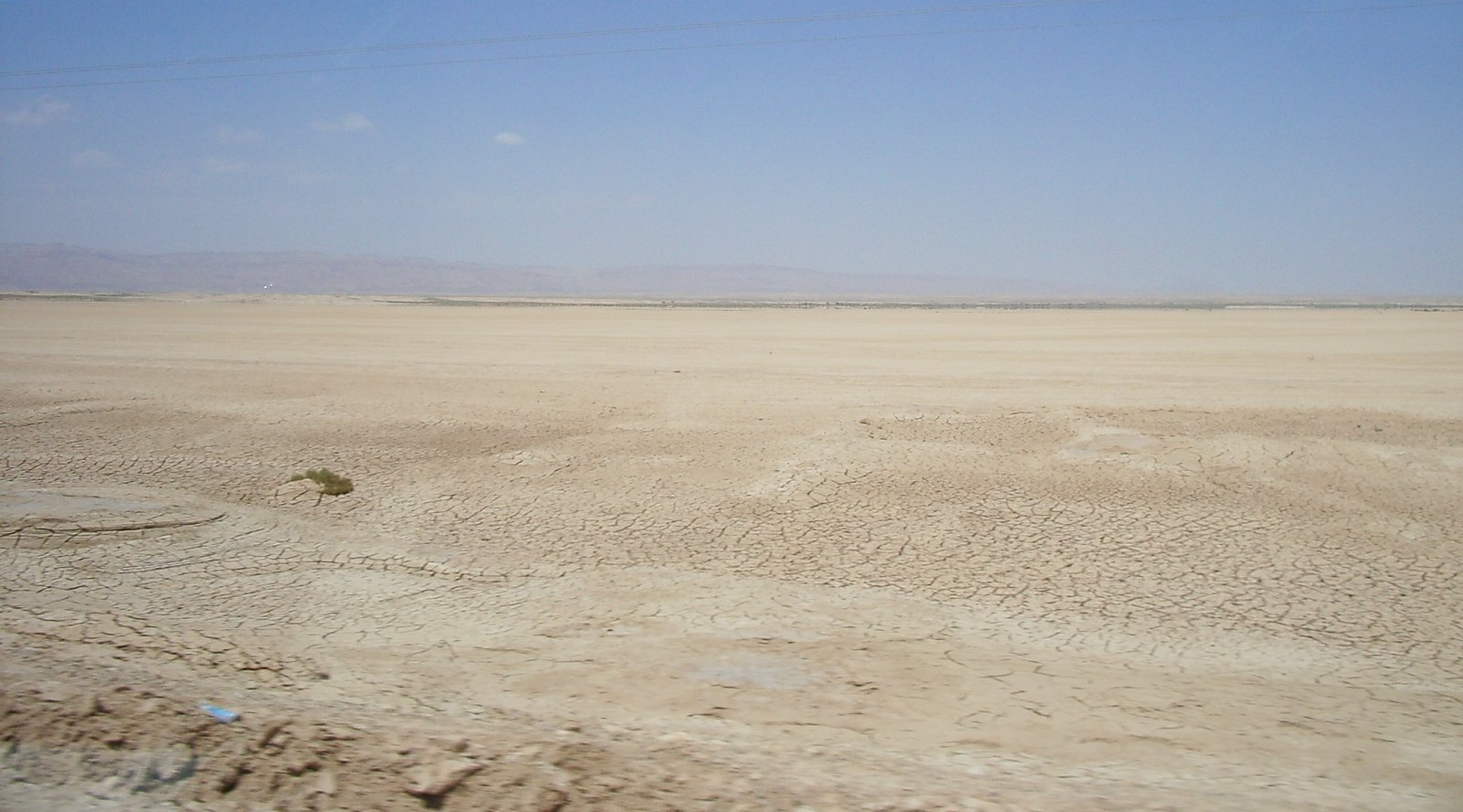

- Shatt al Gharsah in Tunisia
- Coordinates: 34.07°N 7.52°E
- Type: Salt lake, sedimentary basin
- Primary inflows: rain
- Primary outflows: terminal Evaporation
- Basin countries: Tunisia
- Max. length: 50 km (31 mi)
- Max. width: 20 km (12 mi)
- Surface area: 1,000 km^{2} (390 sq mi)
- Surface elevation: −17 m (−56 ft)

Shatt al Gharsah, Chott el Gharsa (Arabic: شط الغرسة) is a sedimentary basin and also intermittent salt lake (a chott) in Tunisia, near the border with Algeria. It has width of 20 kilometres (12 mi) and length of 50 kilometres (31 mi). At 17 metres (56 ft) below sea level it is at the lowest point of the country.
