= Chott =

Dry lake in the Saharan area of Africa

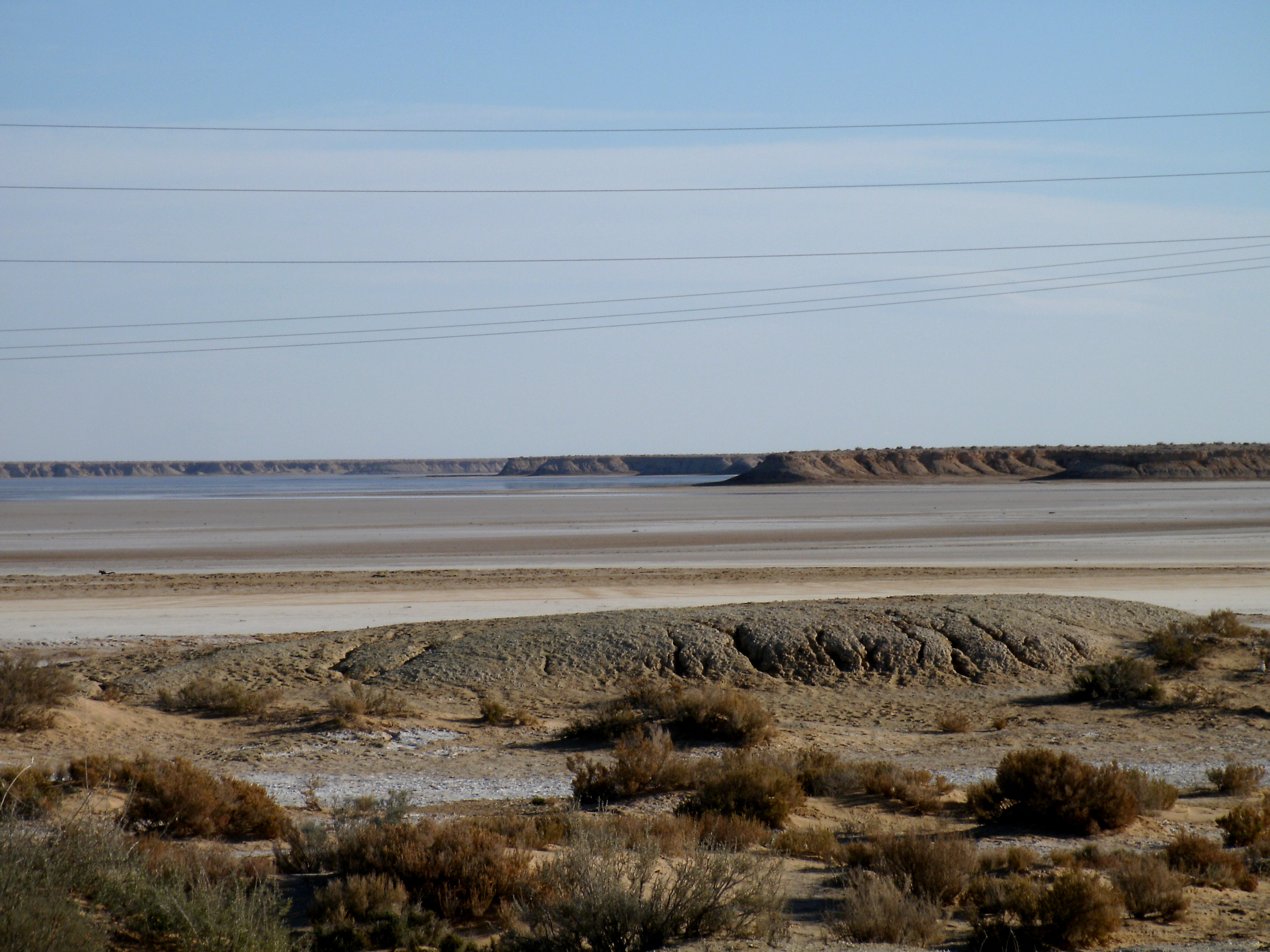

In geology, a chott, shott, or shatt (/ˈʃɒt/; Arabic: شط, romanized: šaṭṭ, lit. 'bank, coast') is a salt lake in Africa's Maghreb that stays dry for much of the year but receives some water in the winter. The elevation of a chott surface is controlled by the position of the water table and capillary fringe, with sediment deflation occurring when the water table falls and sediment accumulation occurring when the water table rises. They are formed—within variable shores—by the spring thaw from the Atlas mountain range, along with occasional rainwater or groundwater sources in the Sahara, such as the Bas Saharan Basin.

== Water sources ==
The chotts of the Sahara are fed intermittently during periods of infrequent rainfall. They are subject to a high evaporation rate, hence salts eventually accumulate in the surface of the sediment. In fact, annual evaporation rates per year in chotts often exceed 20 times the annual precipitation rate. This salt accumulation can lead chotts to have particularly high albedo, albeit with comparable variability as well. While evaporite deposition predominates on chotts, in more humid climatic periods, layers of mud can be deposited on the chott surface. When near a source of loose sand, aeolian deposition can also play a role in the sedimentary deposition on the chott surface.

== Sahara Sea ==
As many lie below sea level, the chotts of the Sahara were viewed by some European colonialists and engineers as an opportunity to create an inland sea in the Sahara Desert (known by many as the "Sahara Sea") by cutting a canal to the Mediterranean Sea (or in some cases, the Atlantic Ocean). Such a channel would allow water from the sea to flow inland. The hope was that this would facilitate trade and naval warfare, as well as change the climatic conditions of the Sahara.

== Analogue to Martian landforms ==
Chotts have also been studied because they are believed to be an Earth analogue to similar features on the planet Mars. Although there are considerable differences between terrestrial and Martian geology, some features on Mars are also believed to be evaporite basins, and consequently share at least some features of chotts. One example of a suspected Martian evaporite basin is Holden Crater.

== List of major chotts ==
- Chott el Djerid
- Chott ech Chergui
- Chott Melrhir
- Chott el Fejej
- Chott el Hodna
- Shatt al Gharsah

== See also ==
- Djerid
- Sabkha
- Shatt al-Arab
- Nouakchott
