= Chott el Djerid =

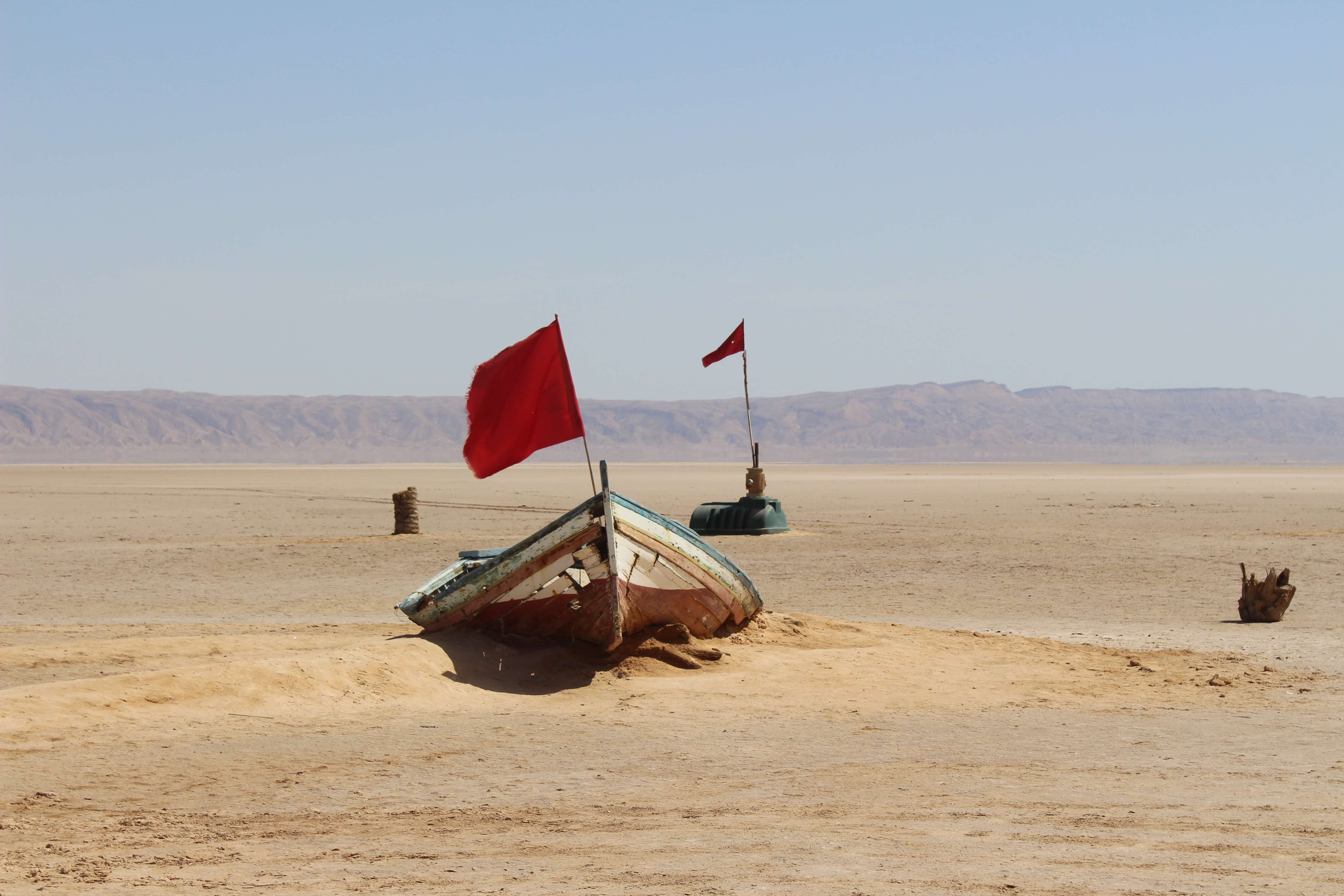
- In summer Chott el Djerid is almost entirely dried up, as seen in this photo from May 2021.

- Chott al-Djarid in Tunisia
- Coordinates: 33.7°N 8.43°E
- Type: Salt lake, endorheic basin
- Primary inflows: groundwater
- Primary outflows: terminal Evaporation
- Basin countries: Tunisia
- Max. length: 250 km (160 mi)
- Max. width: 20 km (12 mi)
- Surface area: 7,000 km^{2} (2,700 sq mi)
- Surface elevation: +10–25 m (33–82 ft)

Ramsar Wetland
- Designated: 7 November 2007
- Reference no.: 1699

Chott el Djerid (Arabic: شط الجريد Šoṭṭ el-Jarīd) also spelled Sciott Gerid and Shott el Jerid, is a chott, a large endorheic salt lake in central Tunisia. The name can be translated from the Arabic into English as "Lagoon of the Land of Palms".

== Geography ==
The bottom of Chott el Djerid is located between 15 and 25 meters (about 50 to 80 feet) above sea level. The lake's width varies widely; at its narrowest point, it is only 20 km (12 mi) across, compared to its overall length of 250 km (160 mi). At times, parts of it appear in various shades of white, green and purple. The narrow eastward inlet of the chott is also known as Chott el Fejej.

It is the largest salt pan of the Sahara Desert, with a surface area of over 7,000 km^{2} (some sources state 5,000 km^{2}). The site has a typical hot desert climate. Due to the harsh climate with mean annual rainfall of below 100 mm and daytime temperatures sometimes reaching 50 °C (122 °F) or more during summer with dense solar radiation, water evaporates from the lake. In summer Chott el Djerid is almost entirely dried up, and numerous fata morganas occur. It is situated at 33°42′N 8°26′E in the center-west of the country, between the cities of Tozeur and Kebili.

During winter, small tributaries of water can be seen discharging into the lake.

Because the flooded area is very variable, values presented for the area of the lake (or its basin, which is almost always dry), can vary widely. Some sources provide values for surface area as high as 10,000 km².

Currently, freshwater irrigation schemes are being applied in the region to help eliminate salt from soils and increase the productive area.

South of Chott el Djerid, the Grand Erg Oriental desert begins. The towns of Kebili and Douz are located south of the lake, and the city of Tozeur is located just to the northwest.

== Access ==
The lake can be crossed by foot and even by car, but this is very dangerous since the salt crust is not always firm.

During winter, when the lake is full, it can be crossed by boat. Piles of salt at its edges are collected for salt production processing.

== Fauna ==
Relict populations of the West African crocodile persisted in the Chott el Djerid until the early 20th century. Pink flamingos have been known to use the shores of the lake as nesting sites in springtime.

== Namesakes ==
Chott el Djerid is the namesake of the Jerid Lacuna, an endorheic hydrocarbon lake on the Saturnian moon Titan. That lake is located at 66.7°N and 221°W and contains liquid methane and ethane instead of water.

== Flooding project ==
There has been a growing interest in permanently connecting the Chott el Djerid to the Mediterranean to create a Sahara Sea since the mid 2010s with the creation of the association Cooperation Road which in 2018 obtained the approval of the Tunisian government.

A similar project was also considered in the 19th and 20th century by France in French Tunisia.

== In popular culture ==
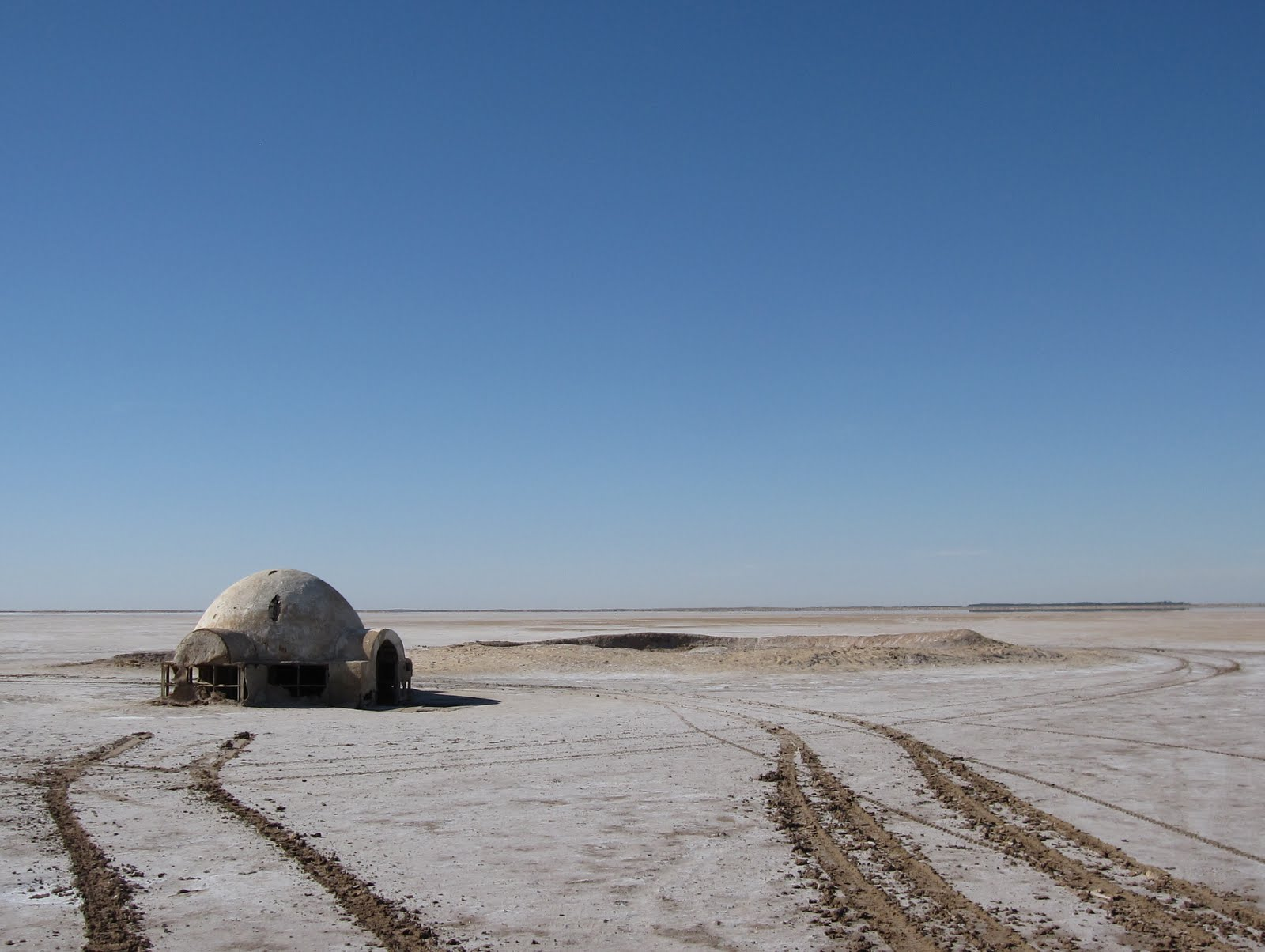
The Lars Homestead set from Star Wars in Chott el Djerid.

Chott el Djerid was used as a filming location for the Star Wars series, among others.

According to a legend, it was where the Greek goddess Athena was born.

It was described in Jules Verne's last novel, Invasion of the Sea.

The lake is the setting of Frank Heller's book The Thousand and Second Night, An Arabesque.

The book In The Desert by the German novelist Karl May begins near the lake and describes a dangerous crossing attempt.

== See also ==
- Chott
- Djerid
- Gafsa Oases
- Sahara Sea
- Lake Tritonis
