= Gulf of Gabès =

Gulf on Tunisia's east coast in the Mediterranean Sea

- Lesser Syrtis
- خليج قابس (Tunisian Arabic)
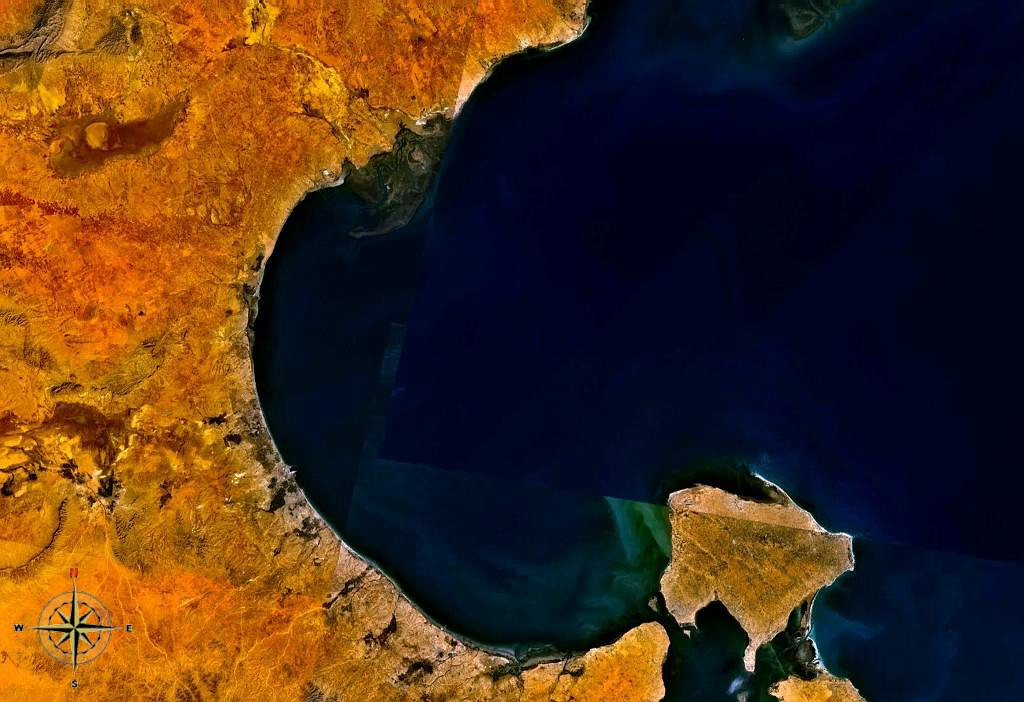
- Satellite image of the Gulf of Gabès

- Location in Tunisia
- Coordinates: 34°00′N 10°25′E
- Ocean/sea sources: Mediterranean
- Basin countries: Tunisia
- Max. length: 50 km (31 mi)
- Max. width: 70 km (43 mi)
- Settlements: Gabès

The Gulf of Gabès (/ˈɡɑːbɛs/, GAW-bess, also Cabès, Cabes, Gaps; Arabic: خليج قابس, romanized: ḫalīǧ Qābis), also known as Lesser Syrtis (from Ancient Greek: Μικρὰ Σύρτις, romanized: Mikrá Sýrtis; Latin: Syrtis Minor), contrasting with the Greater Syrtis in Libya, is a gulf on Tunisia's east coast in the Mediterranean Sea, off North Africa. The gulf roughly spans the coast from Sfax to Djerba. At the head of the gulf is the city of Gabès (Ghannouche) where the tides have a large range of up to 2.1 m at spring tides. Both Gabès and Sfax are major ports on the gulf, supporting sponge and tuna fisheries, with Gabès being the economic and administrative center.

== History ==
The Latin name Syrtis Minor is used by Pliny the Elder, quoting an earlier description in Polybius 1.39.2, who uses the equivalent Ancient Greek: ἡ μικρὰ Σύρτις (elsewhere also Σύρτις ἡ μικρά, Σύρτις ἡ μικροτέρα, ἡ μικροτέρα Σύρτις).

An alternative name was Λωτοφαγῖτις σύρτις Lōtophagîtis sýrtis "Syrtis of the lotus-eaters", reported by Strabo. (Compare Syrtis Major, the ancient name of the Gulf of Sidra.)

Syrtis is referred to in the New Testament of the Bible where the Apostle Paul relates being sent in chains to Rome to stand trial before Caesar Nero. The crew of his ship was worried about being driven by a storm into Syrtis, and took precautions to prevent it, resulting, eventually, in being shipwrecked on the island of Malta in the Mediterranean Sea.

Strabo refers to Tacape (the modern Gabès) as an important entrepot of the Lesser Syrtis.

In Book IV of the Histories, Herodotus describes a violent ritual that took place in the region:

During a festival dedicated to the goddess Athena, their young women divided into two camps and then set to fighting each other with blows from stones and wooden clubs, thereby enacting, as they say, a ceremonial that was instituted by their ancestors in honor of the indigenous deity whom we call Athena. Some of them who die from the wounds are called false virgins.

A modern counterpart to this festival of violence, involving two opposing gangs near the Shatt al-Jerid annually engaging in combat with stones and clubs was described in Une fete de printemps au Jerid (1942) by G. Payre.

== Geography ==
Most sources consider the Gulf of Gabès as just being within the line between the northwest tip of Djerba (Jerba) Island on the southeast and Ras Yonga (Point Yonga) on the northwest. Ras Yonga is just north of the island of Jazīrat Khunayyis and its marshes and some 52 kilometres (32 mi) southwest of Sfax. The geographer Strabo indicated that the entrance to the gulf was located at the islands of Cercinna (Kerkennah) and Meninx (Djerba). Following Strabo gives a larger area with the line being from just north of Sfax to Djerba Island. That larger area would include part of the Kerkennah Islands and the coast around Sfax. The centroid for the smaller gulf is at 33°59′29″N 10°24′09″E, and the distance across is 68.5 kilometres (42.6 mi), with a depth of 51.0 kilometres (31.7 mi). The larger gulf is 150 kilometres (93 mi) across with a depth of 90 kilometres (56 mi), and the centroid is at 34°04′48″N 10°28′36″E.

The entire Gulf of Gabes, both larger and smaller versions, is underlain by the continental shelf of the African Plate, and is nowhere deeper than 200 meters. During the Permian Period and Triassic Period, carbonate minerals and evaporites were deposited in the Gulf of Gabes which now form salt domes and diapirs. In addition carbon and hydrocarbons primarily from vegetation were deposited. These now form the basis for the oil and gas industry in the gulf. Among the important oil and gas fields in the gulf are the Ashtart Field and the Chergui Field. The Ashtart Oil Terminal lies just outside the gulf at 34°17′N 11°23′E where tankers can easily tranship the oil.
