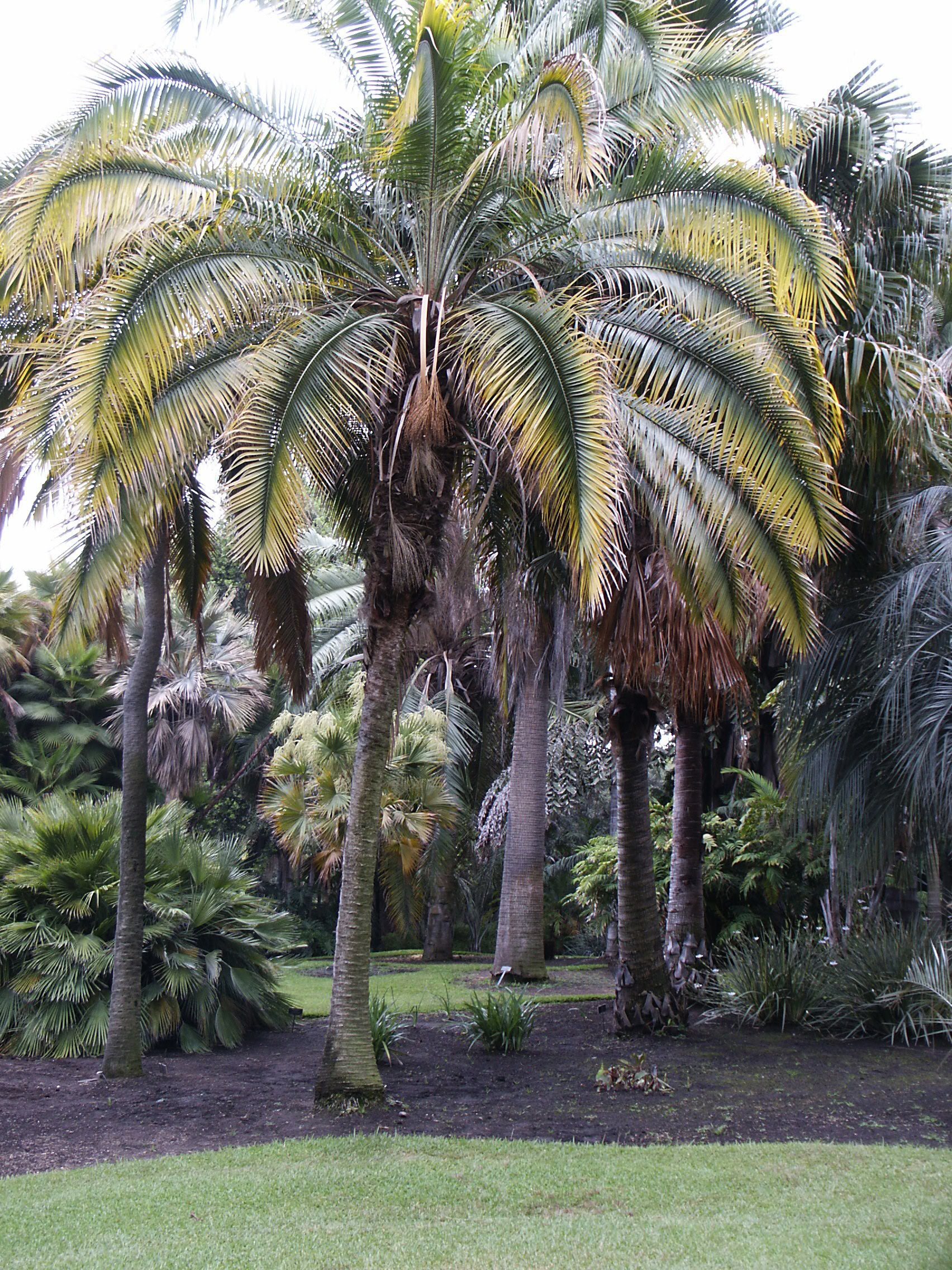

Conservation status
- Near Threatened (IUCN 2.3)

Scientific classification
- Kingdom: Plantae
- Clade: Tracheophytes
- Clade: Angiosperms
- Clade: Monocots
- Clade: Commelinids
- Order: Arecales
- Family: Arecaceae
- Genus: Phoenix
- Species: P. rupicola

Binomial name
- Phoenix rupicola T. Anders.

= Phoenix rupicola =

Species of palm

Phoenix rupicola (rupicola - Latin, inhabitant of rocks) or cliff date palm is a species of flowering plant in the palm family, native to the mountainous forests of India and Bhutan from 300 to 1,200 m (980 to 3,940 ft), usually occurring on cliffs, hillsides and similar terrain. It is threatened by habitat loss in its native range. On the other hand, the species is reportedly naturalised in the Andaman Islands, the Leeward Islands, Cuba and Puerto Rico and a specimen has recently been reported in Saint Lucia.

== Description ==
Phoenix rupicola palm trees grow to 8 metres (26 ft) in height, and 20 cm (8 in) in width. They are usually clean of leaf bases except near the crown.

Leaves are 2.5 to 3 m (8.2 to 9.8 ft) long, 35 cm (14 in) leaflets, pinnately arranged, on 50–60 cm (20–24 in) pseudo petioles armed with spines. The spines are much less numerous and less vicious than the other Phoenix species.

The fruit is an oblong, yellow to orange drupe, 2 cm (0.8 in) long containing a single large seed.
