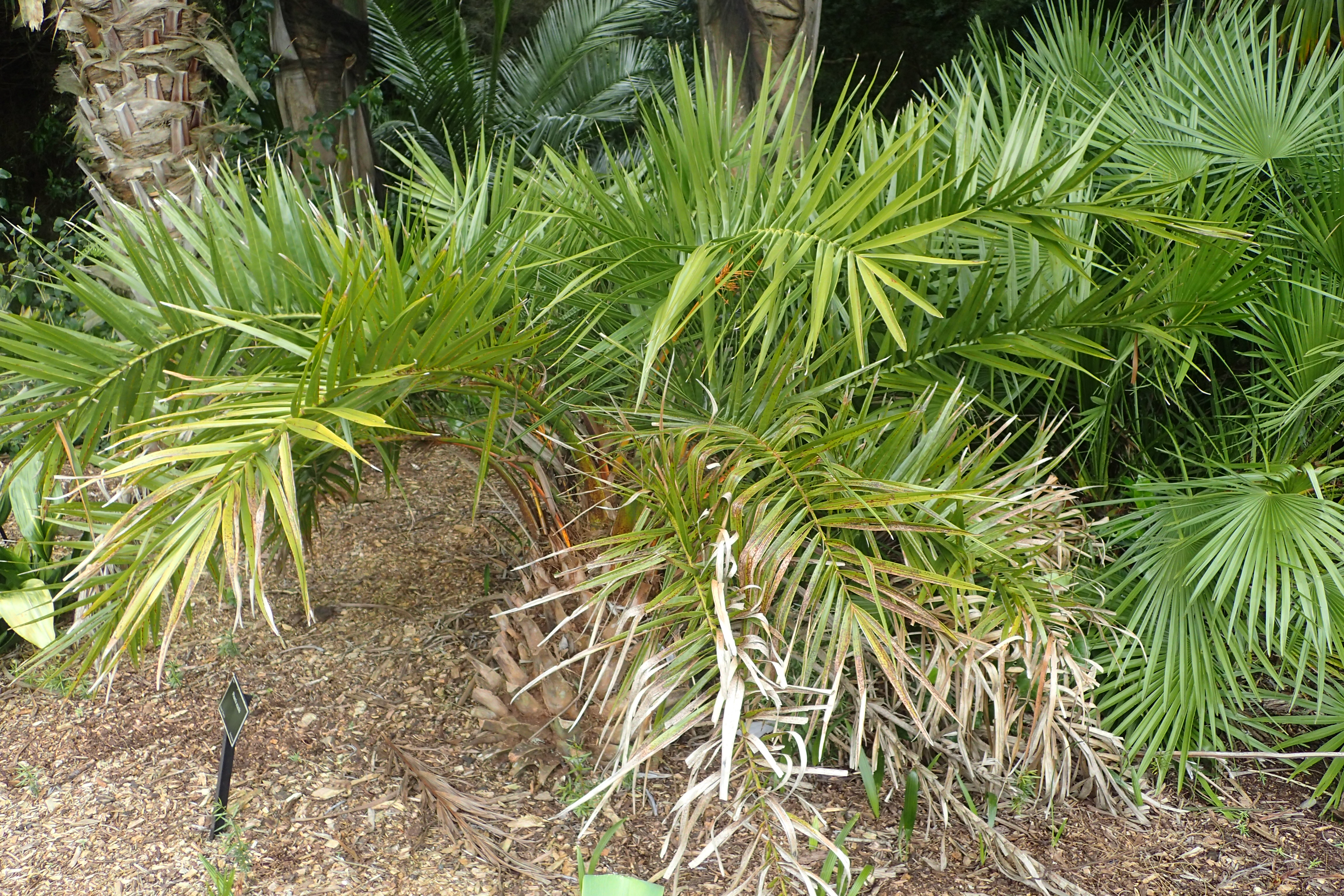

Scientific classification
- Kingdom: Plantae
- Clade: Tracheophytes
- Clade: Angiosperms
- Clade: Monocots
- Clade: Commelinids
- Order: Arecales
- Family: Arecaceae
- Genus: Phoenix
- Species: P. acaulis

Binomial name
- Phoenix acaulis Roxb.

= Phoenix acaulis =

Dwarf date palm

Species of palm

Phoenix acaulis (acaulis, Latin, trunkless) the dwarf date palm or stemless date palm, is a species of flowering plant in the palm family, native to northern India, Bhutan and Nepal. Found at altitudes from 350 to 1,500 m (1,150 to 4,920 ft), Phoenix acaulis grows in scrubland, savannas and in pine forests. Trunks in this species remain underground or, at most, grow to a few inches in height. Leaves are 1.5 m (4 ft 11 in) long, gray-green, with 25 cm (9.8 in), pinnately arranged leaflets on short, armed petioles.
