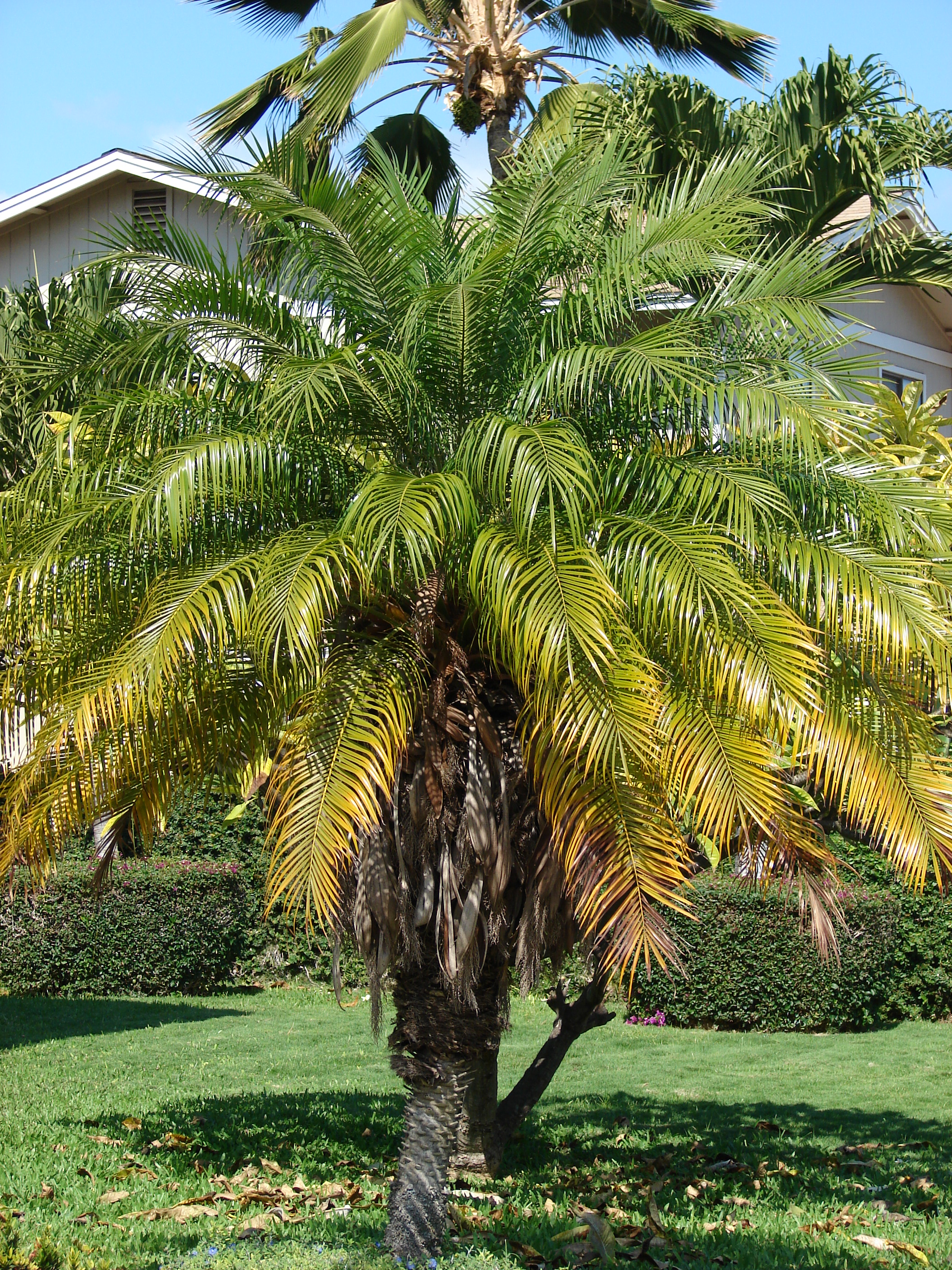

Scientific classification
- Kingdom: Plantae
- Clade: Tracheophytes
- Clade: Angiosperms
- Clade: Monocots
- Clade: Commelinids
- Order: Arecales
- Family: Arecaceae
- Genus: Phoenix
- Species: P. roebelenii

Binomial name
- Phoenix roebelenii O'Brien

= Phoenix roebelenii =

Species of palm

Phoenix roebelenii, with common names of dwarf date palm, pygmy date palm, miniature date palm or robellini palm, is a species of date palm native to southeastern Asia, from southwestern China (Yunnan Province), northern Laos and northern Vietnam (in Dien Bien Province, Ha Giang Province, Cao Bang Province, Lang Son Province).

The Latin specific epithet roebelenii honours the orchid collector Carl Roebelen (1855–1927).

== Description ==
Phoenix roebelenii is a small to medium-sized, slow-growing slender tree growing to 2–7 metres (6.6–23.0 ft) tall. The leaves are 60–120 cm (24–47 in) long, pinnate, with around 100 leaflets arranged in a single plane (unlike the related P. loureiroi where the leaflets are in two planes). Each leaflet is 15–25 cm (6–10 in) long and 1 cm wide, slightly drooping, and grey-green in colour with scurfy pubescence below.

The flowers are small, yellowish, produced on a 45 cm (18 in) inflorescence. The fruit is an edible 1 cm drupe resembling a small, thin-fleshed date.

== Cultivation and uses ==
Phoenix roebelenii is a popular ornamental plant in gardens in tropical and subtropical climate areas. With a minimum temperature requirement of −3 °C (27 °F), it is grown under glass or as a houseplant in cooler areas. It needs little pruning to develop a strong structure, is resistant to pests, is tolerant to soil variation, and is moderately drought tolerant. The plant grows in partial shade to full sun, with the local climate determining where to plant.

This plant has gained the Royal Horticultural Society's Award of Garden Merit.

The NASA Clean Air Study concluded that this was a plant that was effective at removing common household air toxins formaldehyde and benzene.

== Gallery ==
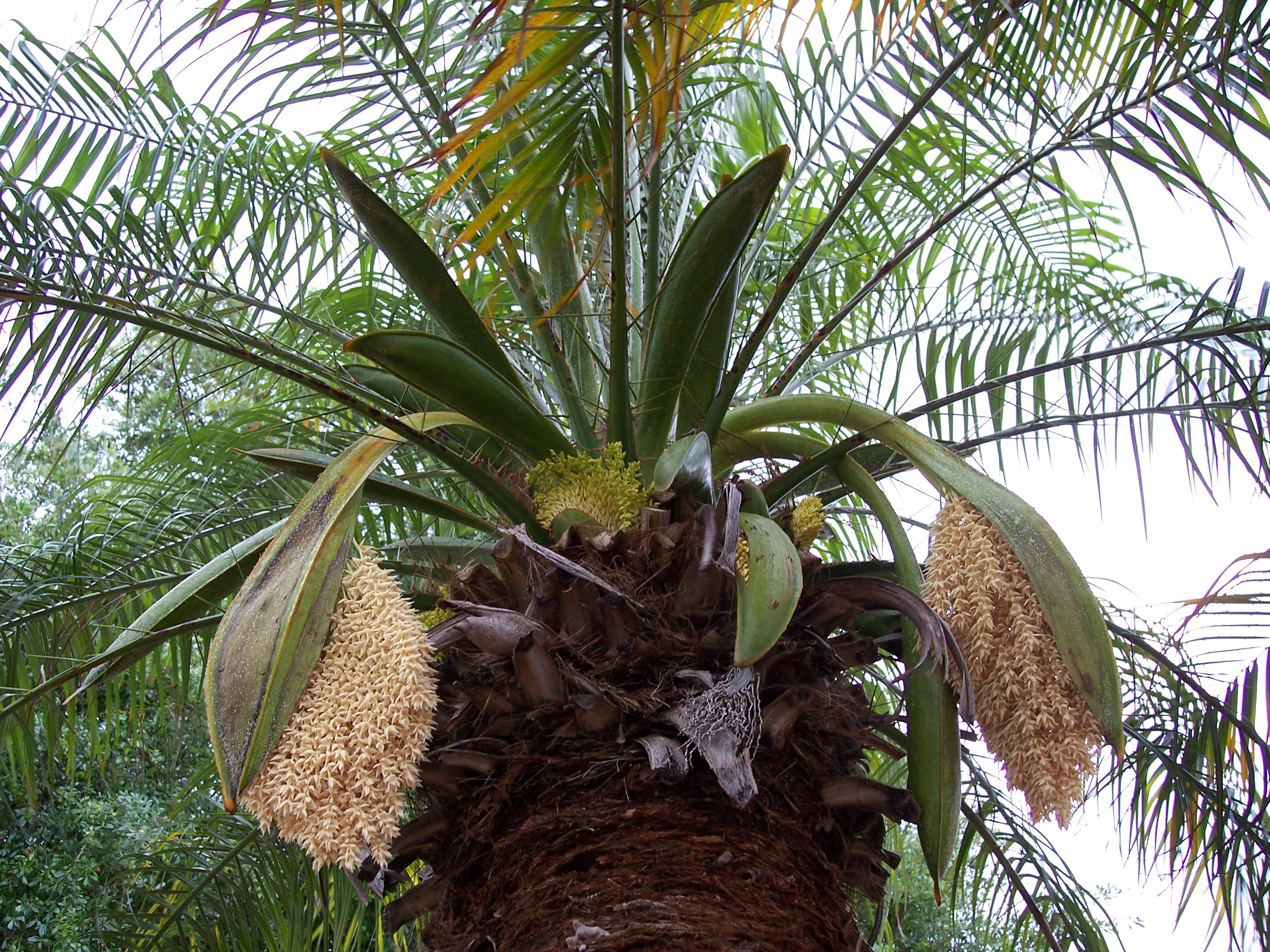
New inflorescences

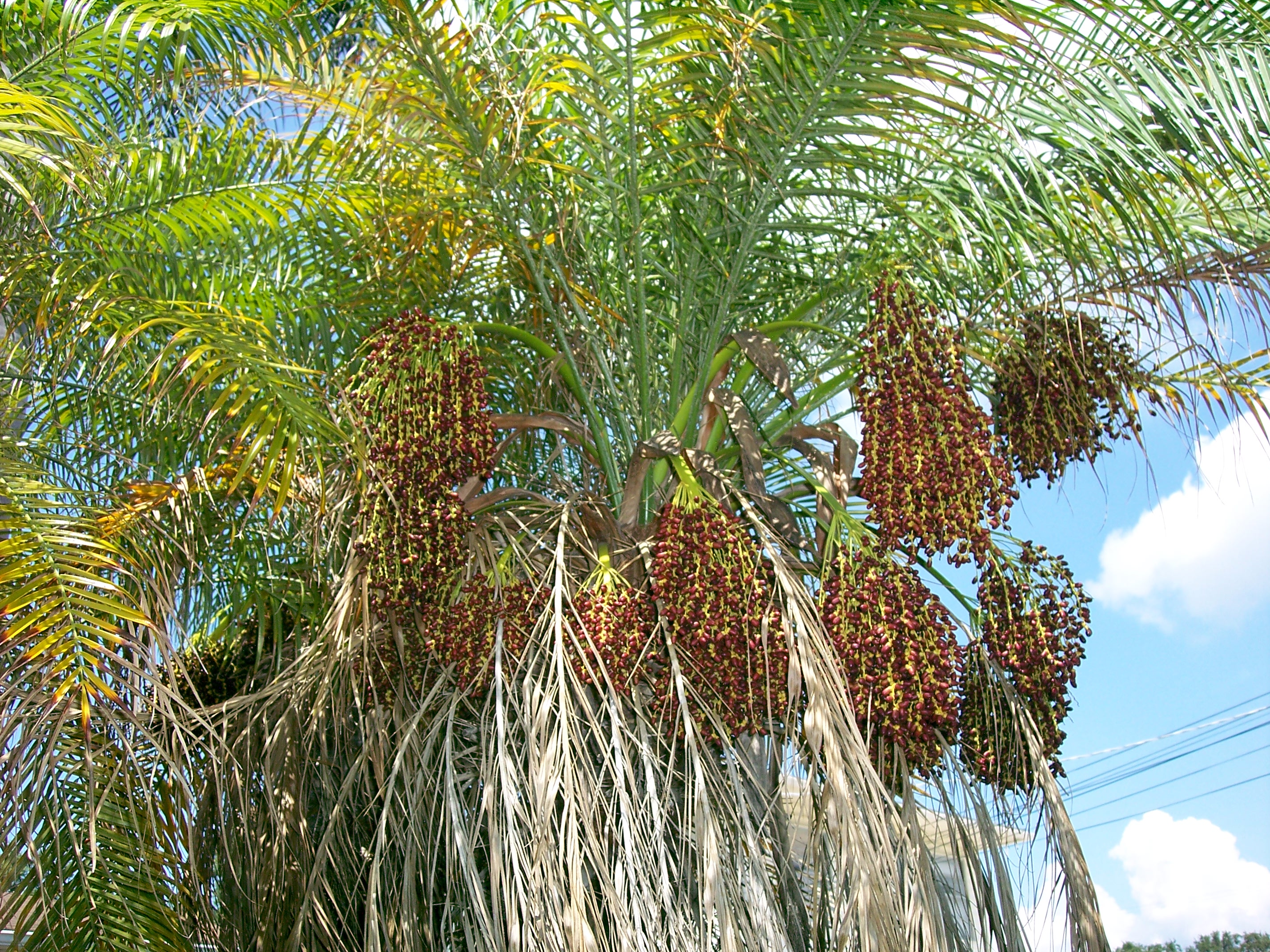
Fruit

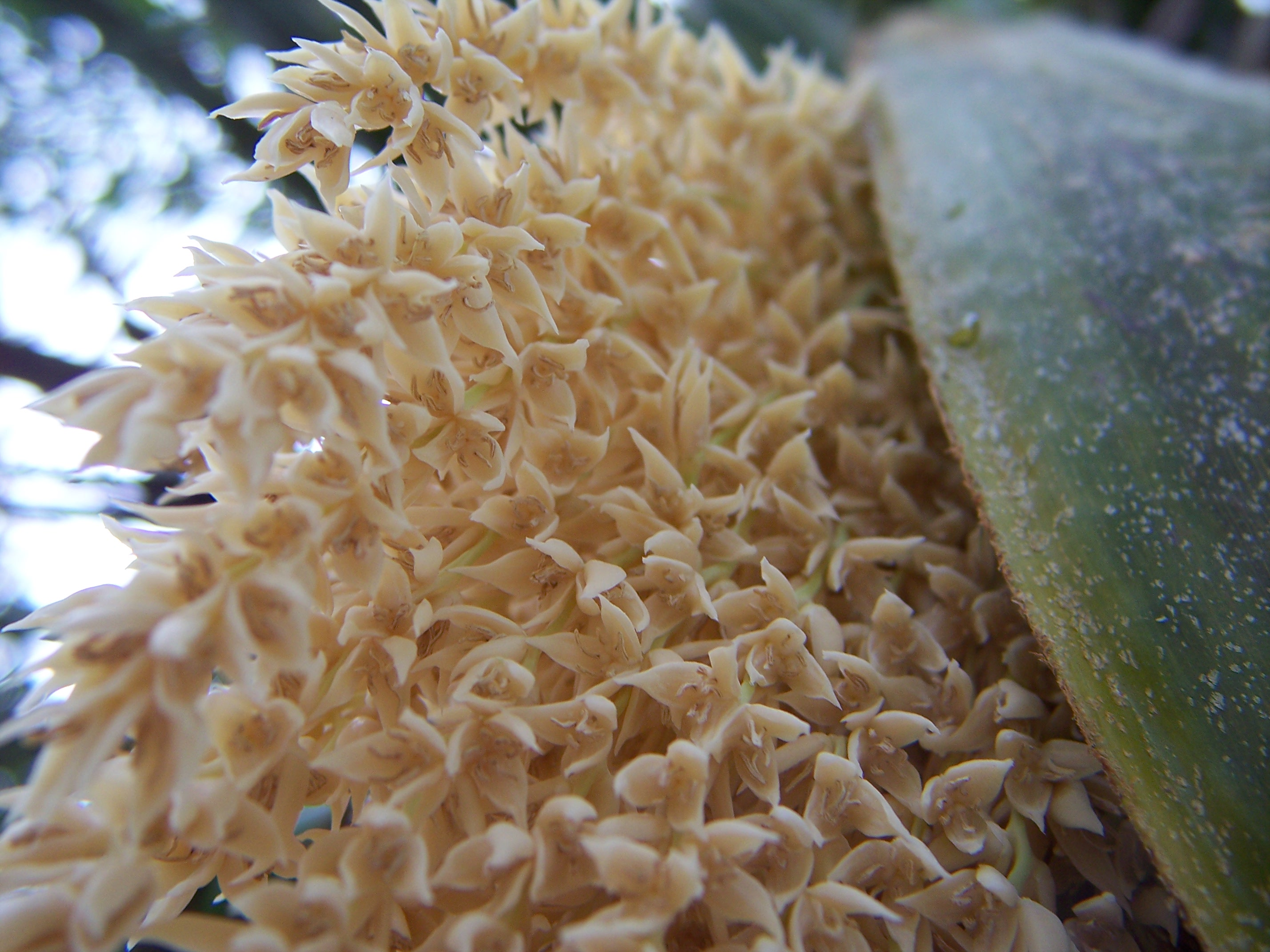
Male flowers
