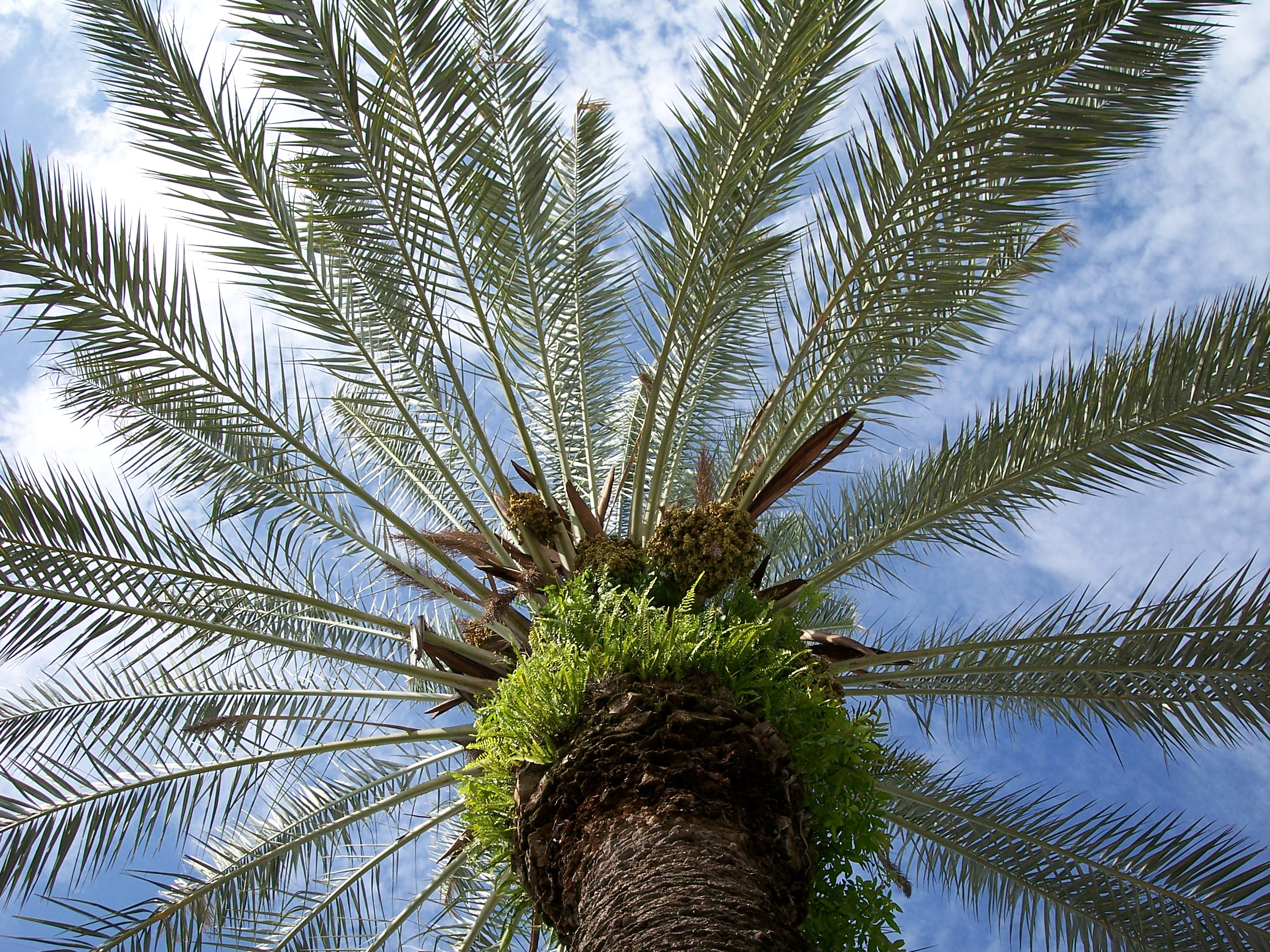
- Date palm (Phoenix dactylifera)

Scientific classification
- Kingdom: Plantae
- Clade: Embryophytes
- Clade: Tracheophytes
- Clade: Angiosperms
- Clade: Monocots
- Clade: Commelinids
- Order: Arecales
- Family: Arecaceae
- Subfamily: Coryphoideae
- Tribe: Phoeniceae
- Genus: Phoenix; L.

Synonyms
- Elate L.; Palma Mill.; Dachel Adans.; Phoniphora Neck.; Fulchironia Lesch.; Zelonops Raf.

= Phoenix (plant) =

Genus of flowering plants of the palm family

Phoenix is a genus of 14 species of palms, native to an area starting from the Canary Islands in the west, across northern and central Africa, to the extreme southeast of Europe (Crete), and continuing throughout southern Asia, from Anatolia east to southern China and Malaysia. The diverse habitats they occupy include swamps, deserts, and mangrove sea coasts. Most Phoenix species originate in semi-arid regions, but usually occur near high groundwater levels, rivers, or springs. The genus is unusual among members of subfamily Coryphoideae in having pinnate, rather than palmate leaves; tribe Caryoteae also have pinnate or bipinnate leaves. The palms were more numerous and widespread in the past than they are at present. Some Phoenix palms have become naturalised in other parts of the world; in particular, the date palm's long history of cultivation means that escaped plants in the past have long-since become ingrained into the native ecosystems of countries far from its original range in the Middle East.

== Etymology ==
The generic name derives from φοῖνιξ (phoinix) or φοίνικος (phoinikos), the Greek word for the date palm used by Theophrastus and Pliny the Elder. It most likely referred to either the Phoenicians; Phoenix, the son of Amyntor and Cleobule in Homer's Iliad; or the phoenix, the sacred bird of Ancient Egypt.

== Description ==
This genus is mostly medium to robust in size, but also includes a few dwarf species; trunks are solitary in four species, suckering and clumped in nine, of which one has a prostrate ground trunk. Many of the trunked species do not form above-ground stems for several years. The pinnate leaves, 1–6 m (3.3–19.7 ft) long, all share the common feature of metamorphosed lower-leaf segments into long, vicious spines (acanthophylls). The leaves have short or absent petioles and possess the rare feature among pinnate palms of induplicate (V-shaped) leaflets. The plants are dioecious, with male and female flowers on separate plants; pollination is by both wind and insects. The flowers are inconspicuous yellowish-brown and about 1 cm wide, but grouped on conspicuous large multibranched panicles 30–90 cm (12–35 in) long. The inflorescence emerges from a usually boat-shaped, leathery bract, forming large, pendent clusters. Phoenix fruit develops from one carpel as a berry, 1–7 cm (0.4–2.8 in) long, yellow to red-brown or dark purple when mature, with one elongated, deeply grooved seed.

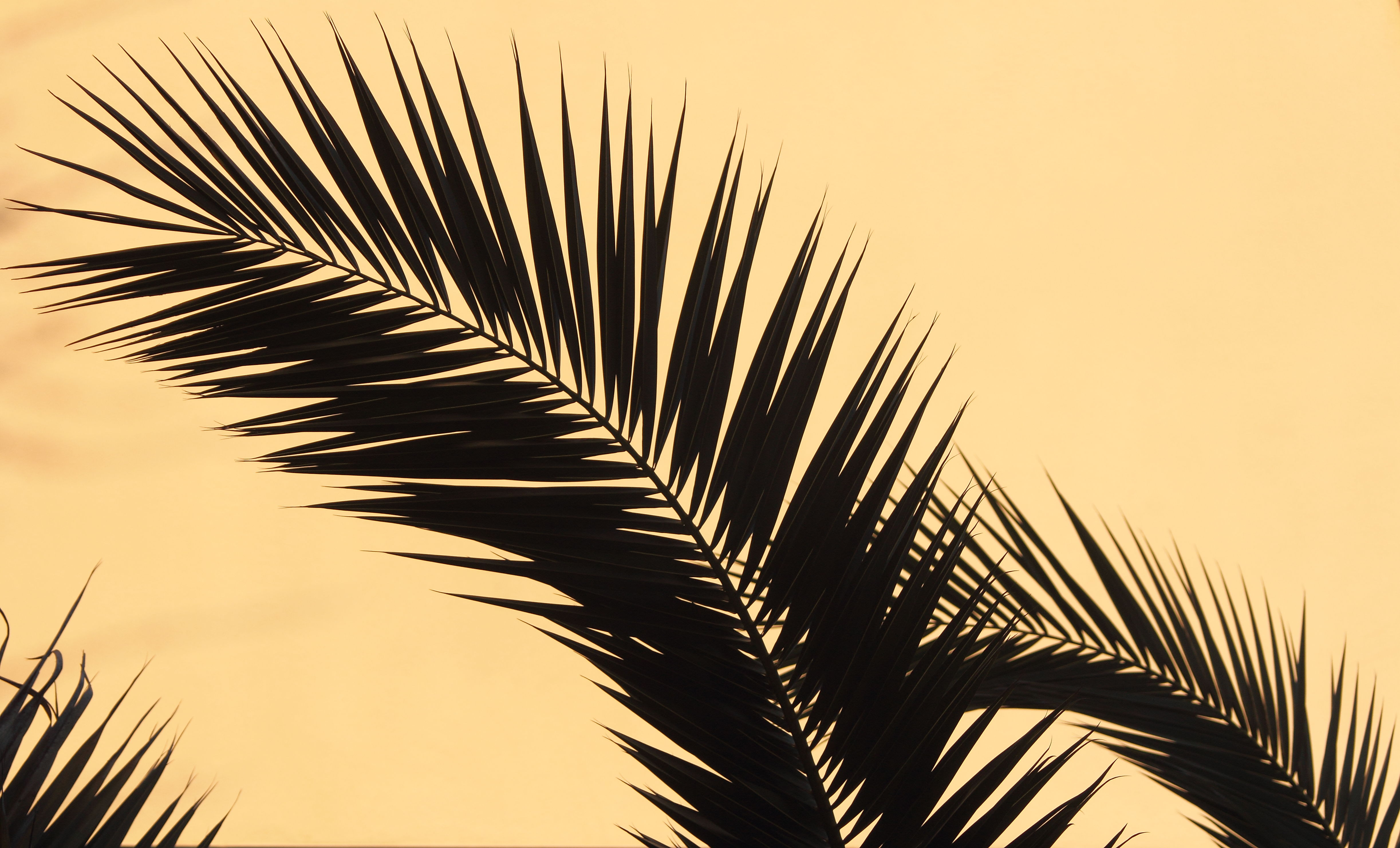
General view of the shape of a Phoenix leaf

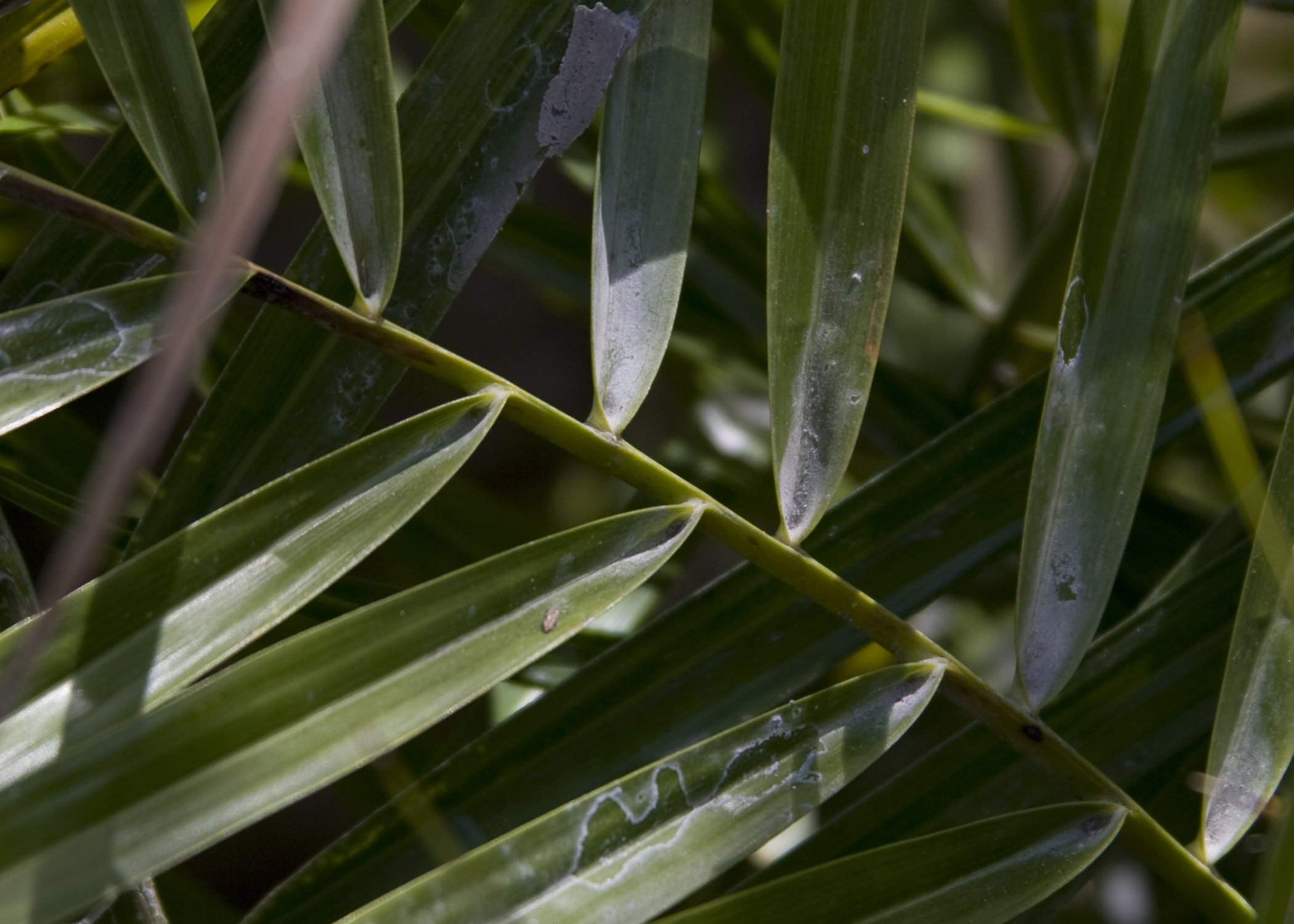
Phoenix foliage showing V-shaped leaflets

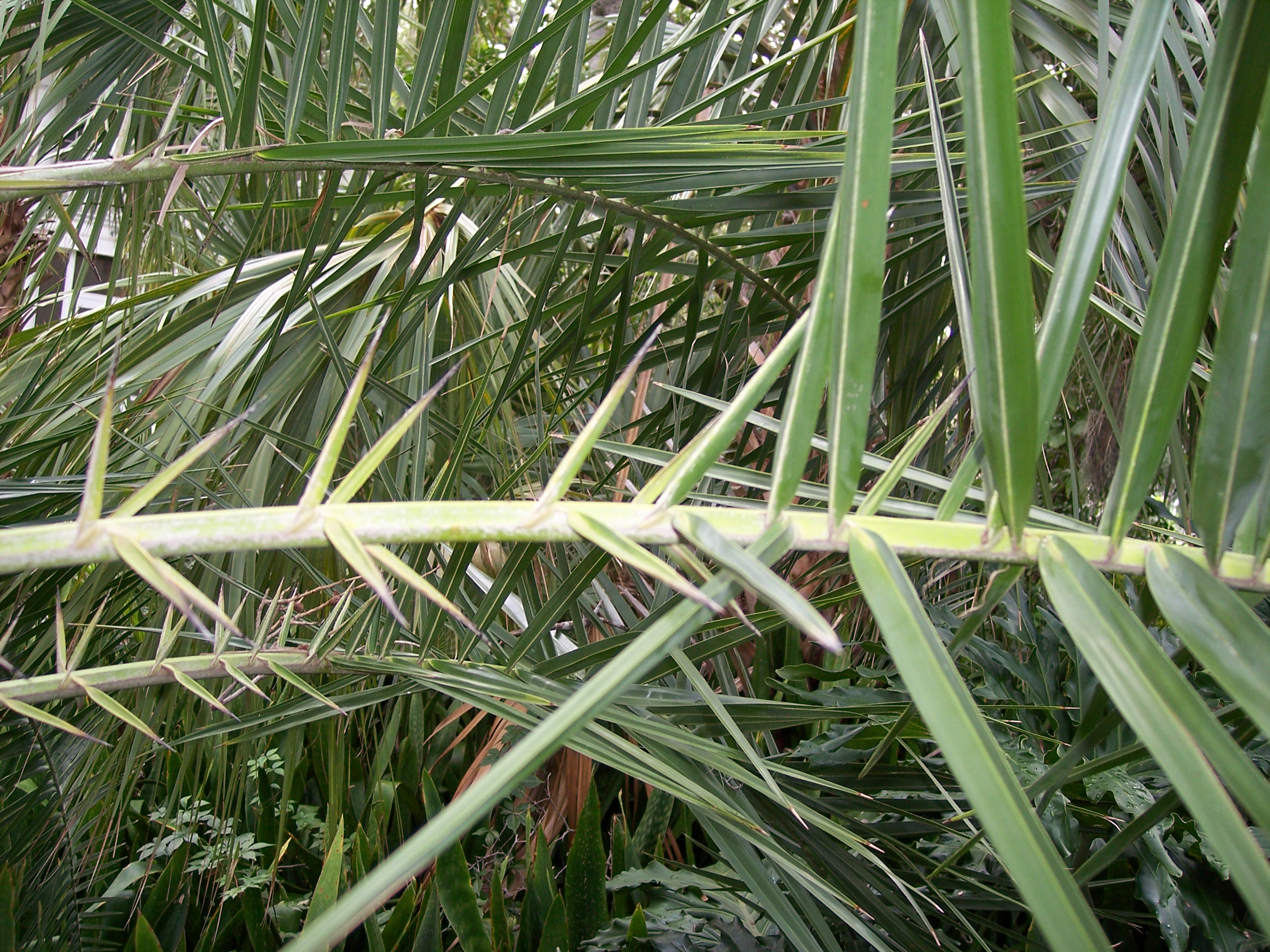
Metamorphosed leaflets into spines, common to Phoenix

== Ecology ==
A majority of the forest palms grow under the shade of dominating forests trees along fragile hill slopes and stream courses in warm, humid conditions. The palms are found growing on a wide variety of soils, often extending to degraded forest margins in grasslands. In the tropics, most are found below 1,250 m (4,100 ft) altitude. Branching of the aerial trunk is rare and is mainly induced by injury to the terminal growing bud. Flowering and fruit are regular and annual.

The reproduction is by seeds and by vegetative multiplication. Many species of Phoenix produce vegetative offshoots called bulbils from basal portions of their stems which, on rooting, develop new saplings. Close relationship among the 14 species is illustrated by the ease of hybridisation and cross-pollination. Several natural hybrids were hence obtained: P. dactylifera × P. sylvestris (India), P. dactylifera × P. canariensis (Morocco, Algeria and Israel), and P. dactylifera × P. reclinata (Senegal). Phoenix species are used as food plants by the larvae of some Lepidoptera species, including Paysandisia archon and the Batrachedra species B. amydraula (recorded on P. dactylifera), B. arenosella and B. isochtha (feeds exclusively on Phoenix spp.). They are also hosts to the palm weevil borer Diocalandra frumenti.

== Uses ==
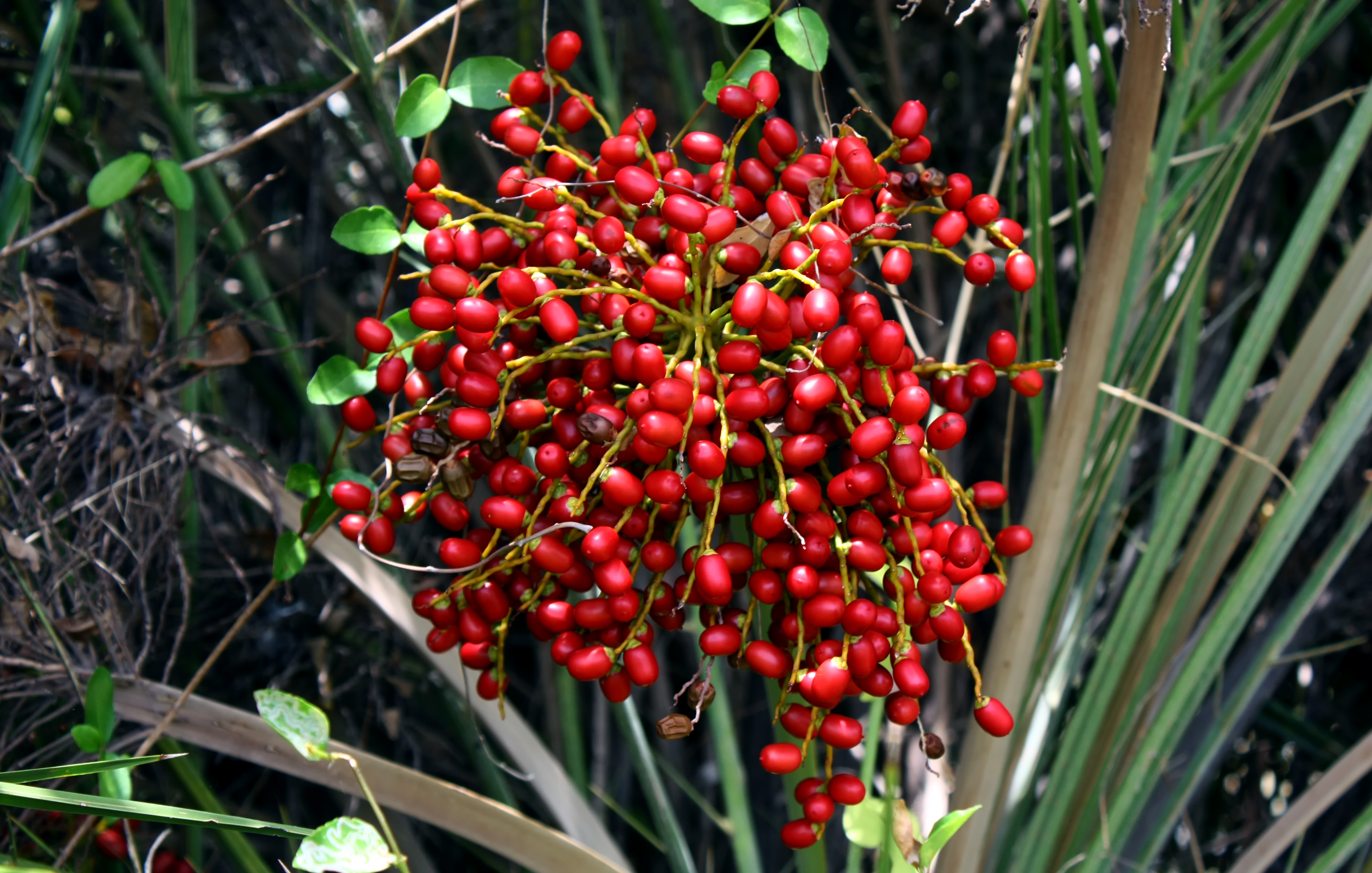
P. sylvestris synonym Phoenix sylvestris has edible sweet fruits.

The fruit of P. dactylifera, the date of commerce, is large with a thick layer of fruit pulp, edible, very sweet and rich in sugar; the other species have only a thin layer of fruit pulp. The central soft part of the stem of P. rupicola, P. acaulis, and P. humilis is a rich source of starch. Palms are felled to extract this central 'pith' which is dried, powdered, stored and used for preparation of bread in the Indian subcontinent. The P. canariensis sap is cooked to a sweet, thick syrup. P. sylvestris Roxb. is widely used in India as a source of sugar. The sugary sap from some African palms yields country liquor on fermentation (palm wine).

While P. dactylifera is grown for its edible dates, the Canary Island date palm (P. canariensis) and pygmy date palm (P. roebelenii) are widely grown as ornamental plants, but their dates are used as food for livestock and poultry. The Canary Island date palm differs from the date palm in having a stouter trunk, more leaves to the crown, more closely spaced leaflets, and deep green rather than grey-green leaves. The fruit of P. canariensis is edible, but rarely eaten by humans because of their small size and thin flesh.

The different species of the genus frequently hybridise where they grow in proximity. This can be a problem when planting P. canariensis as an ornamental plant, as the hybrid palms are aesthetically inferior and do not match the pure-bred plants when planted in avenues, etc.

== Species ==
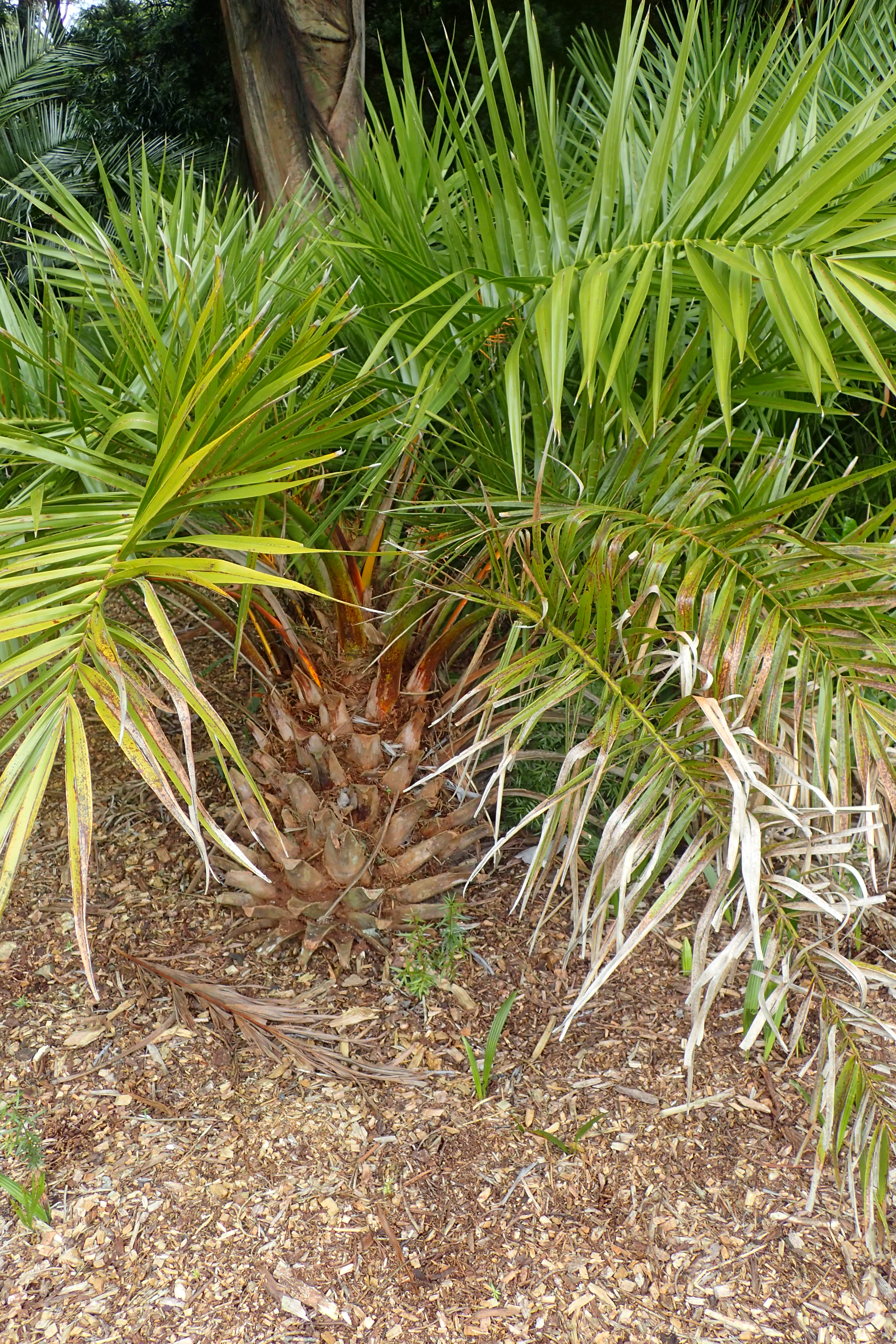
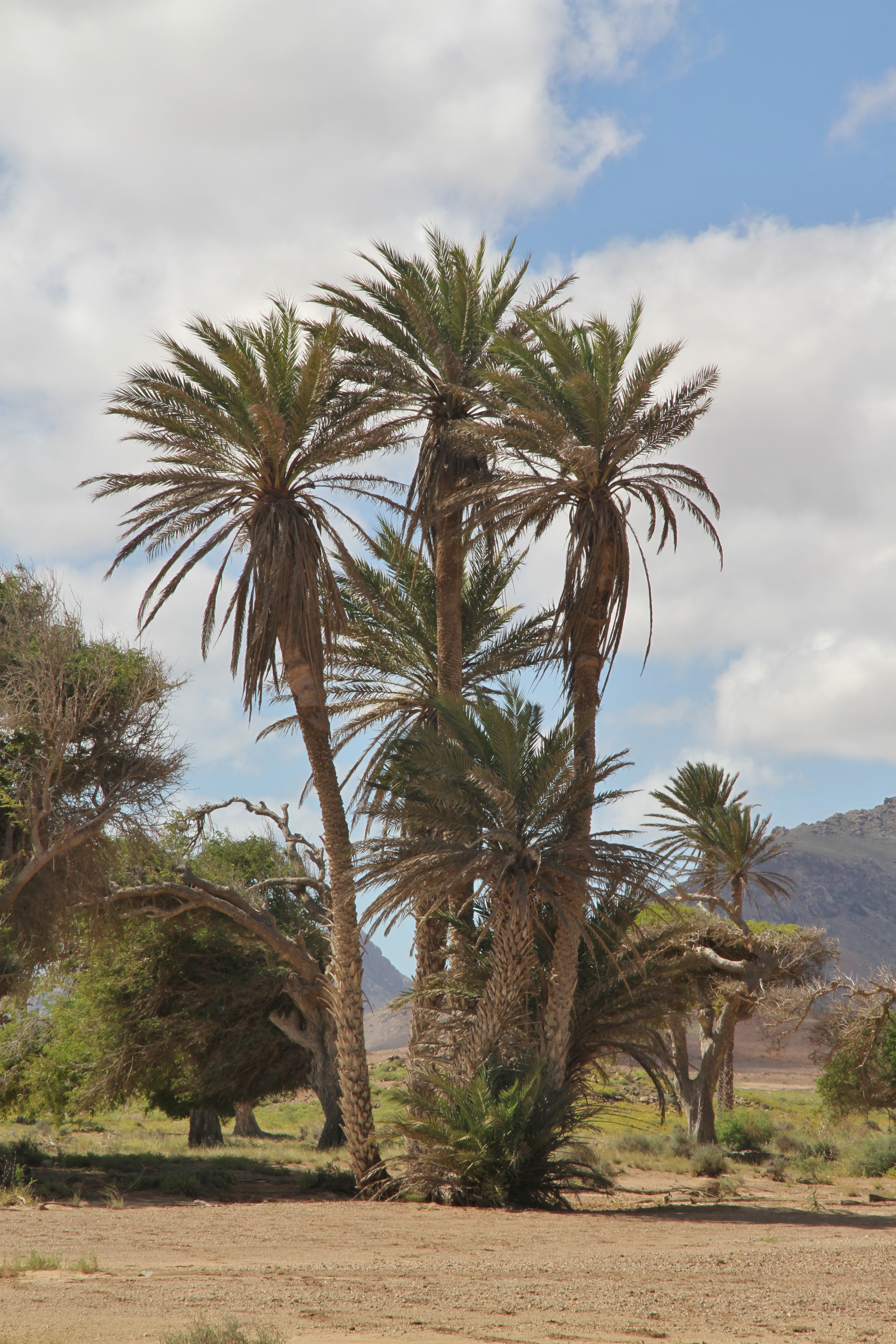
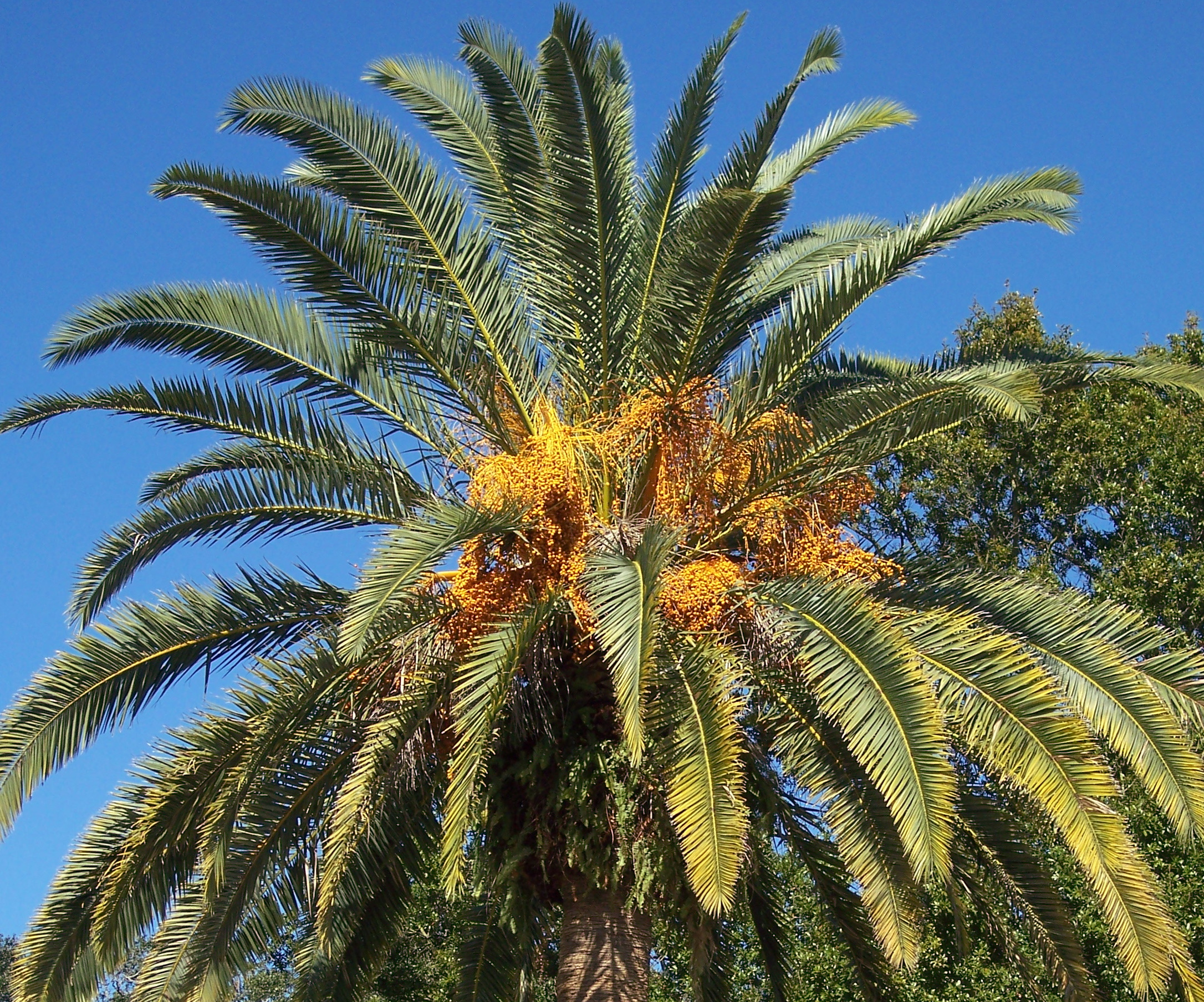
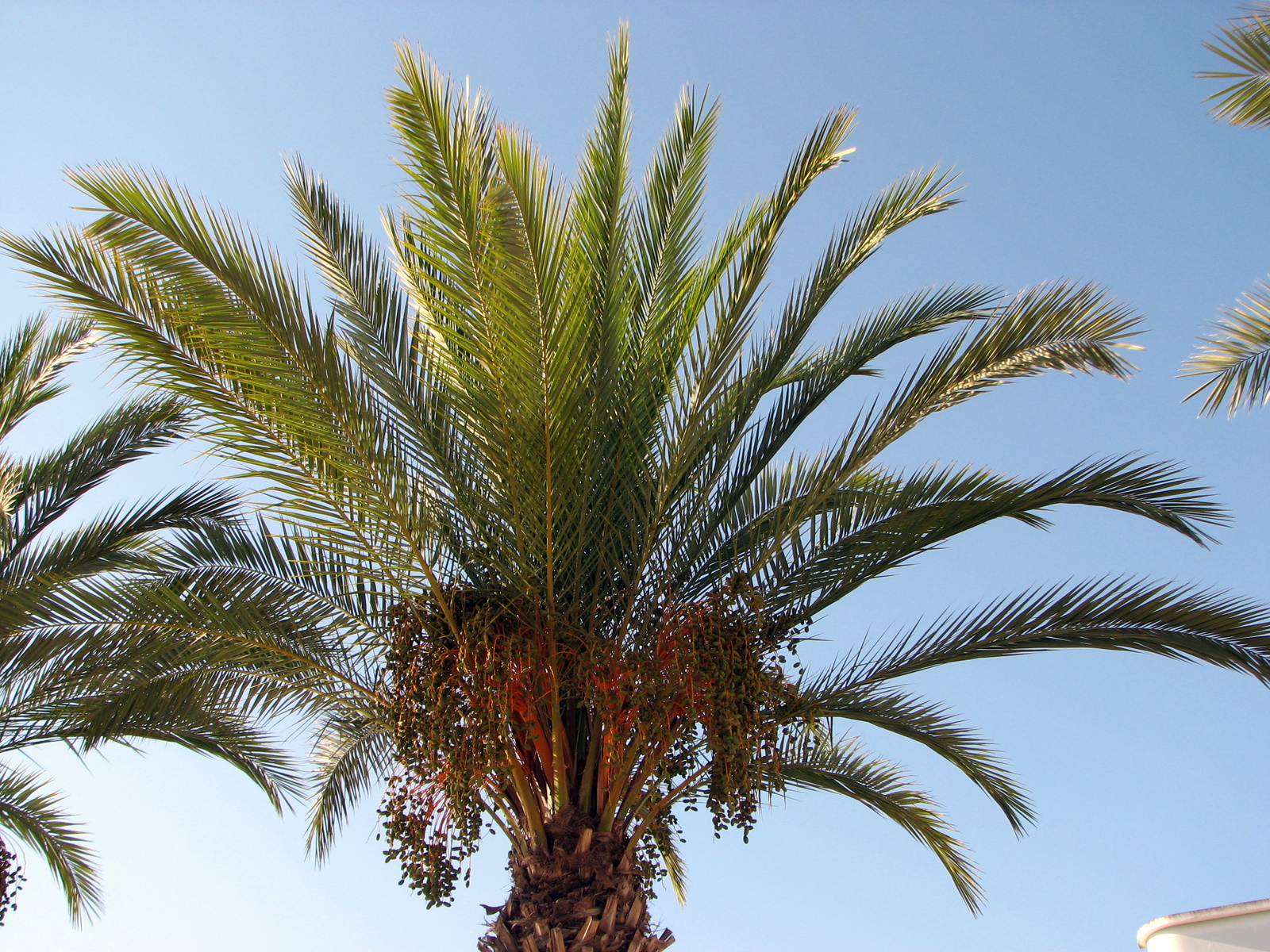
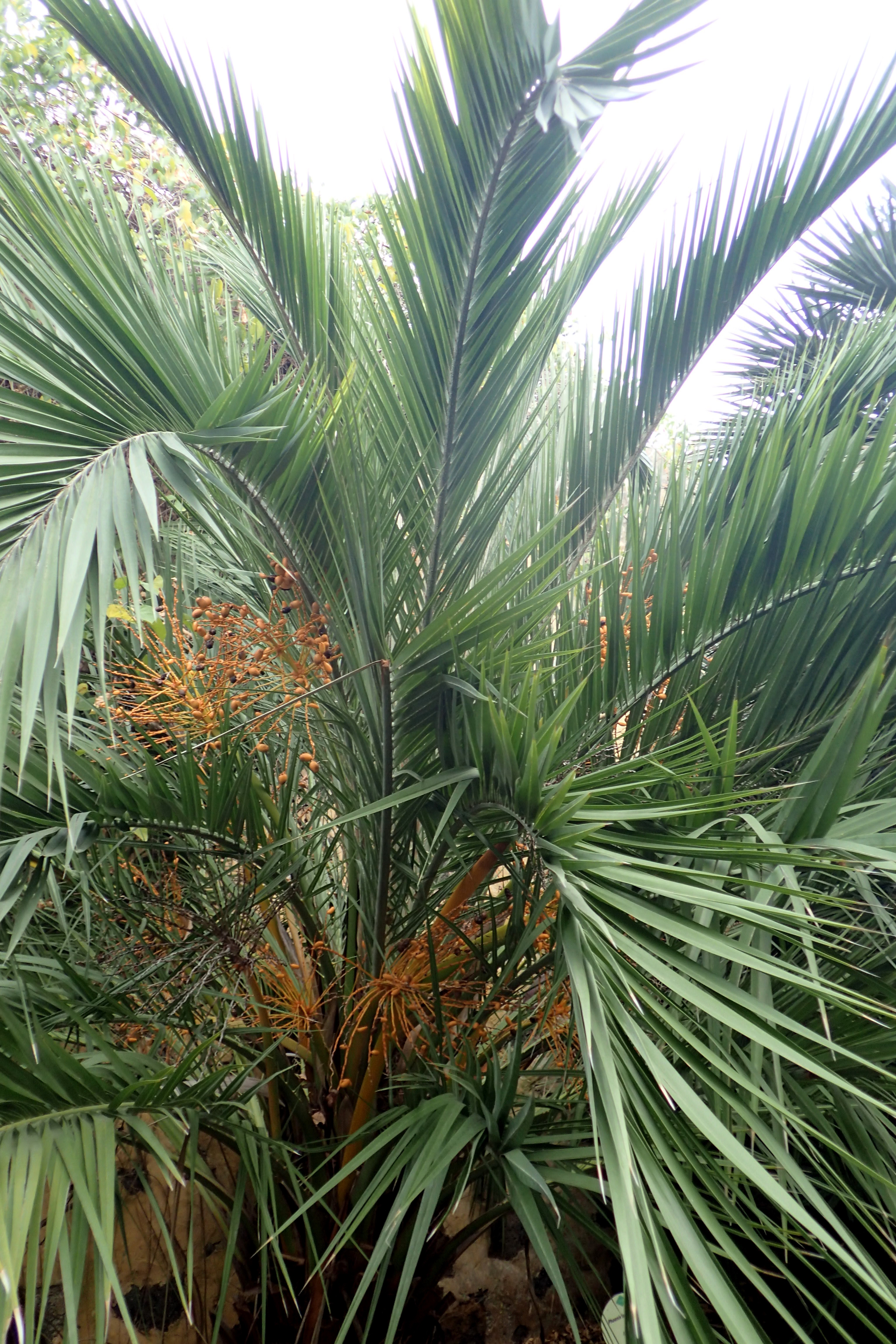
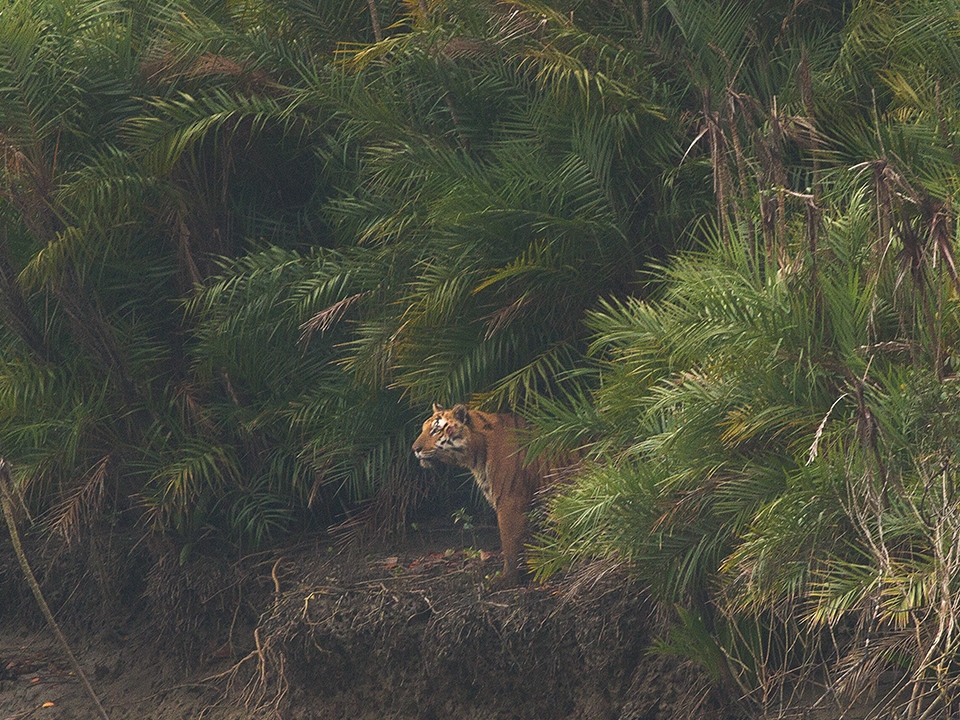
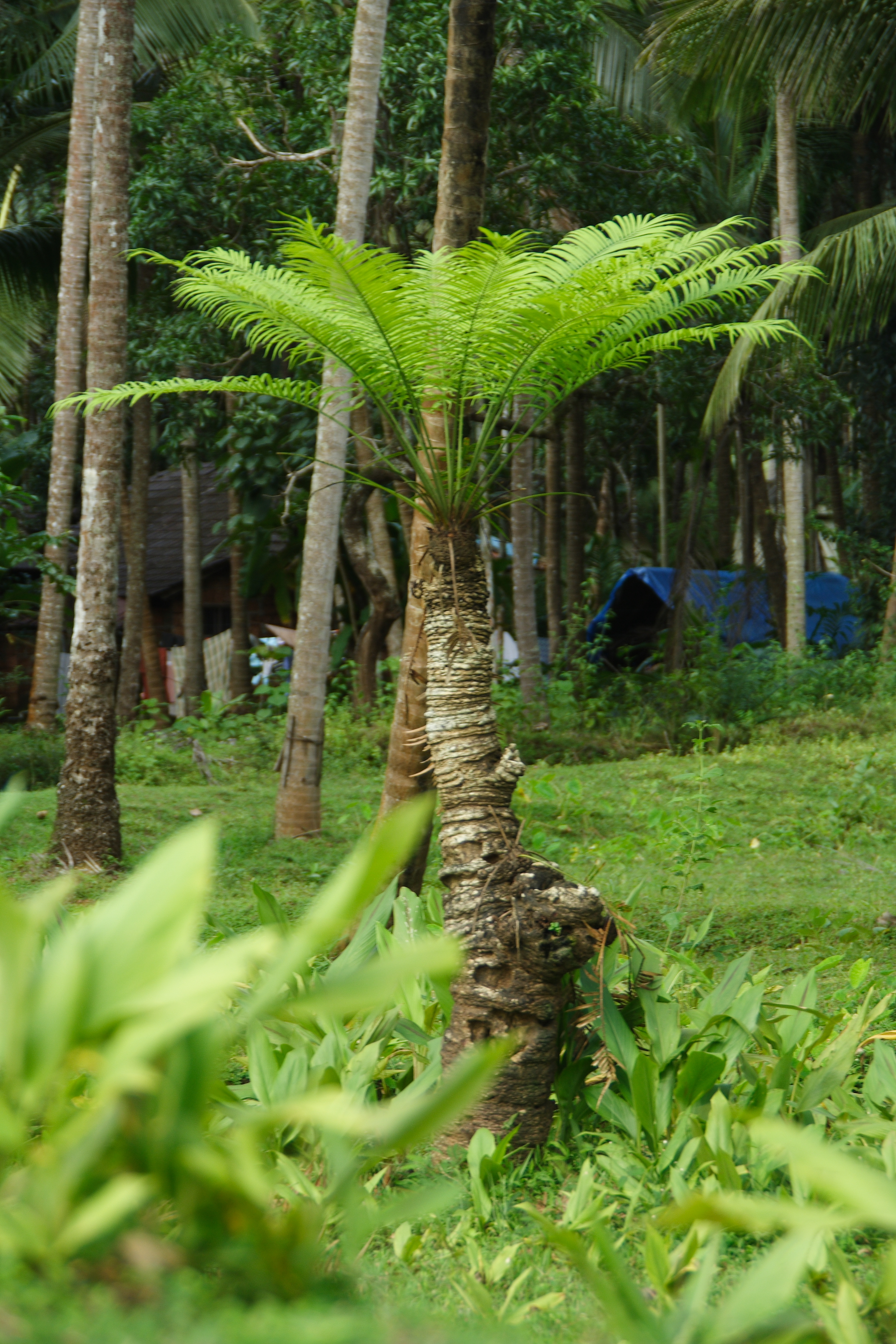
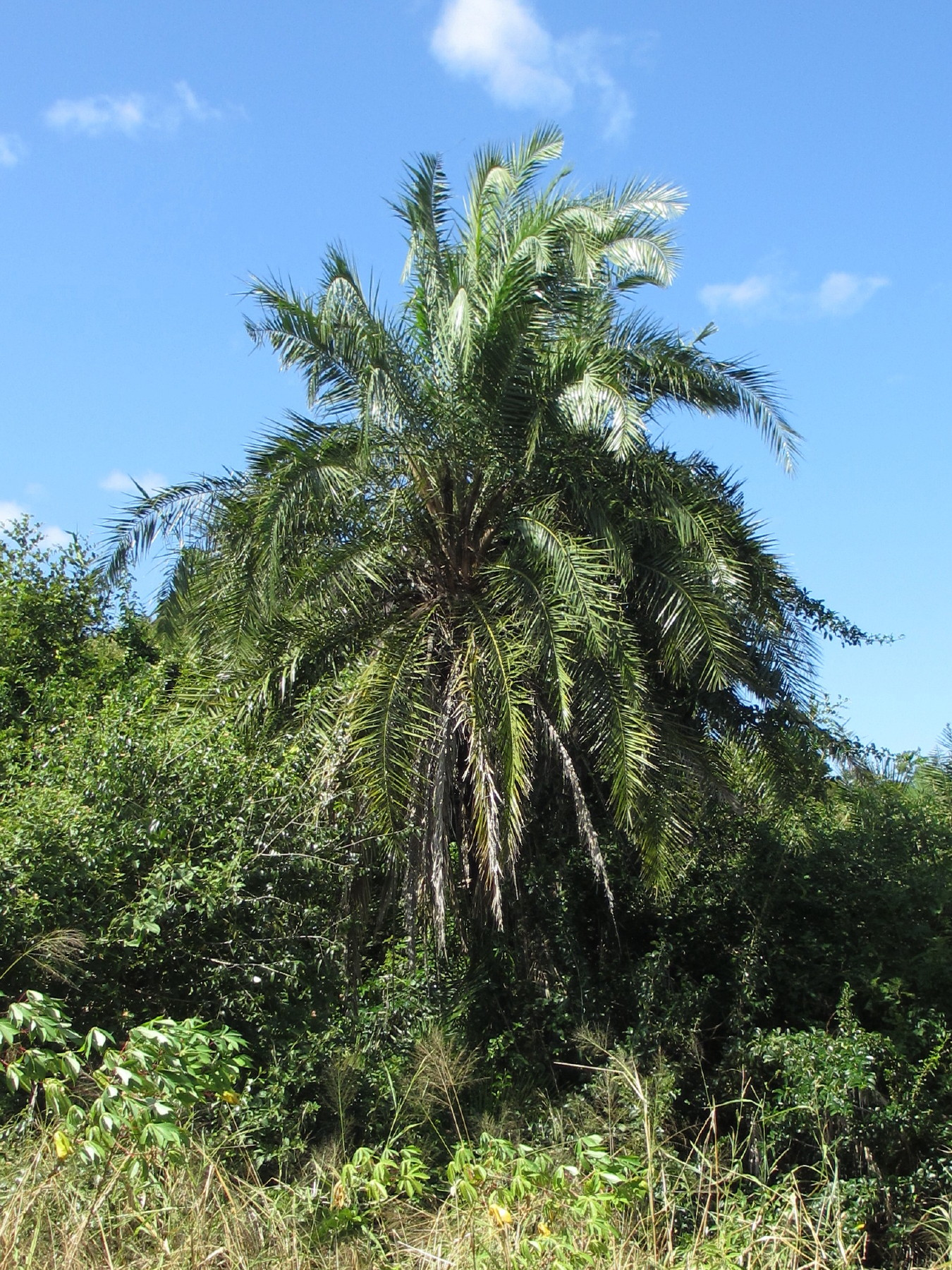
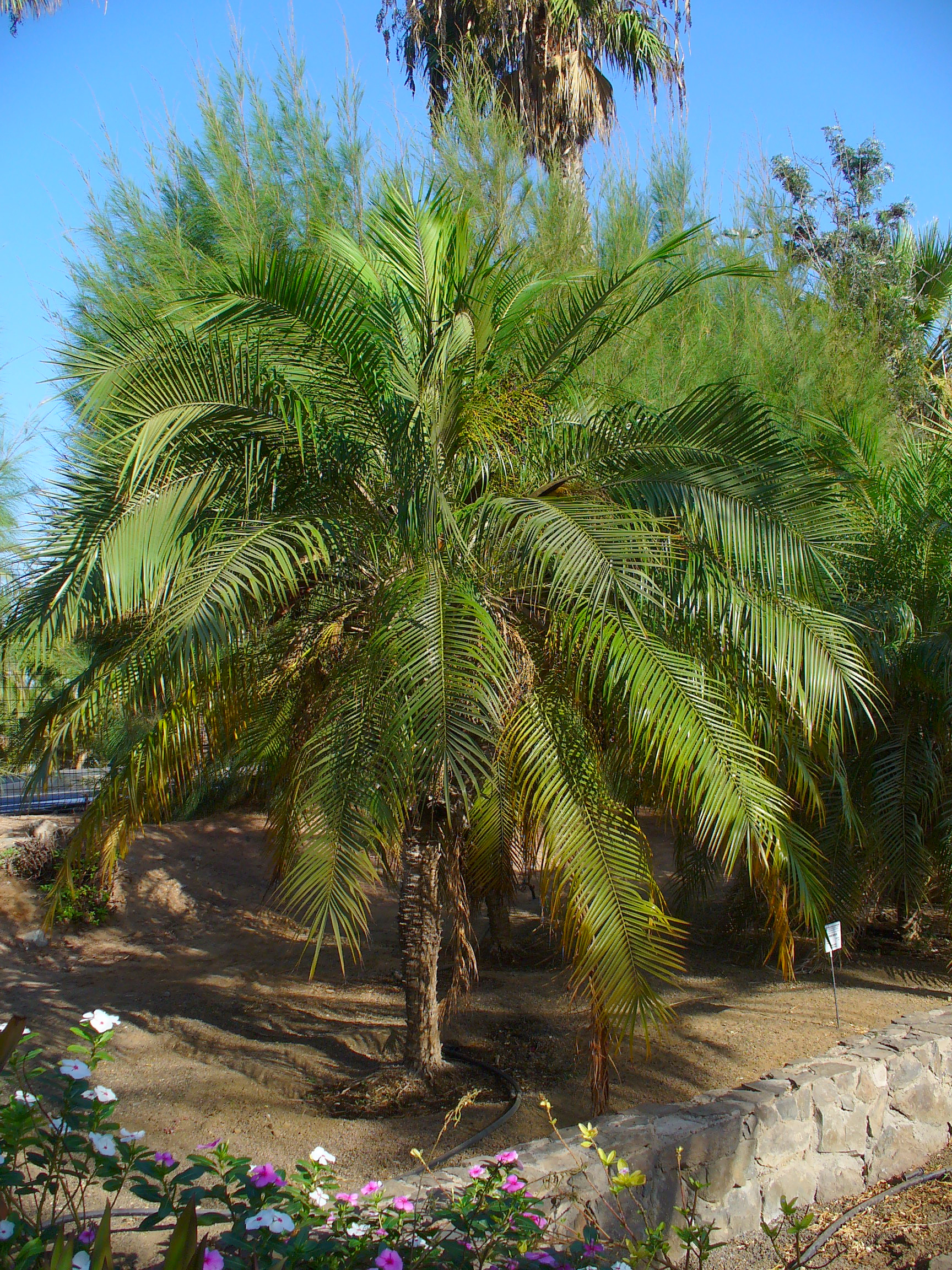
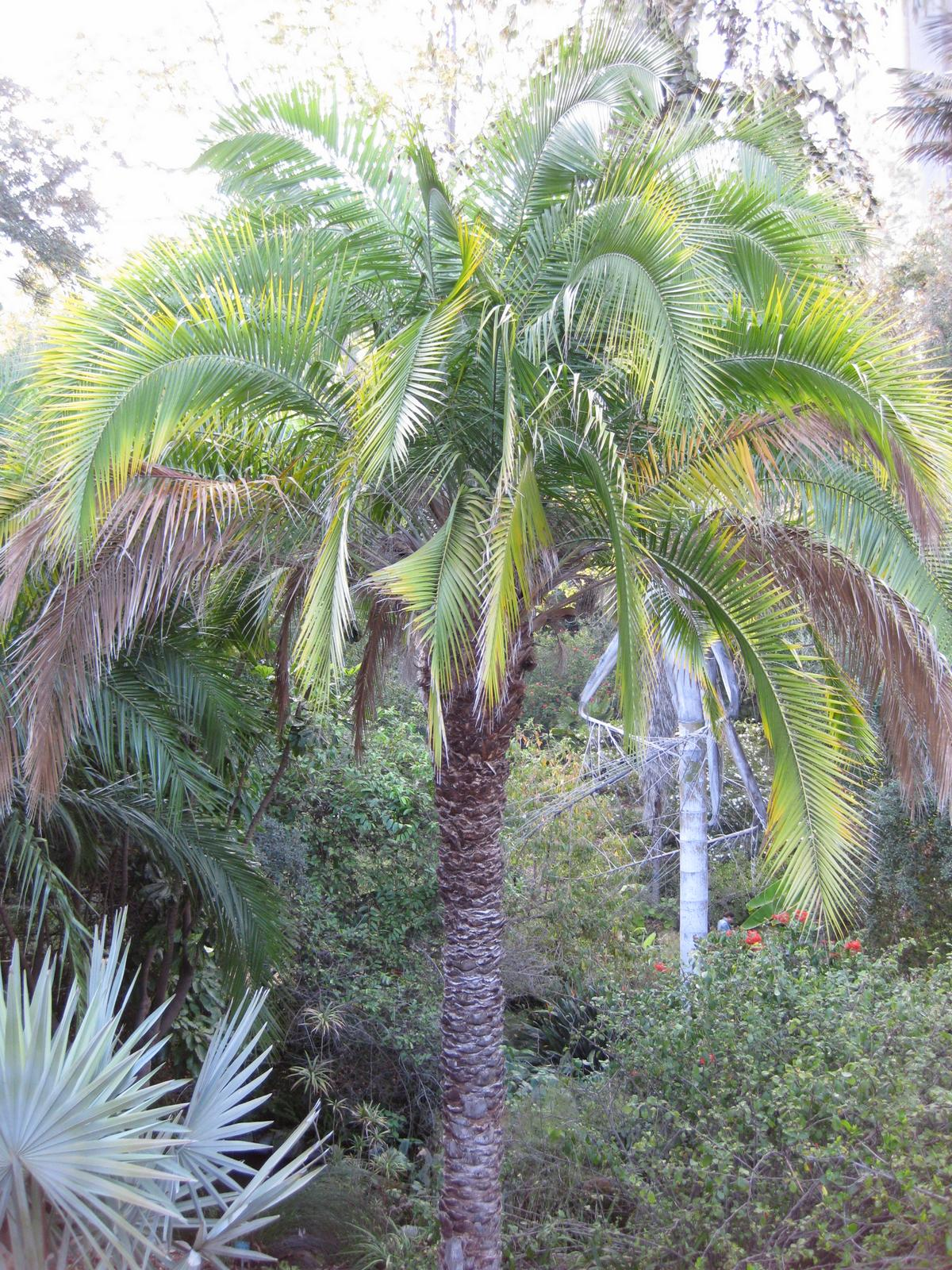
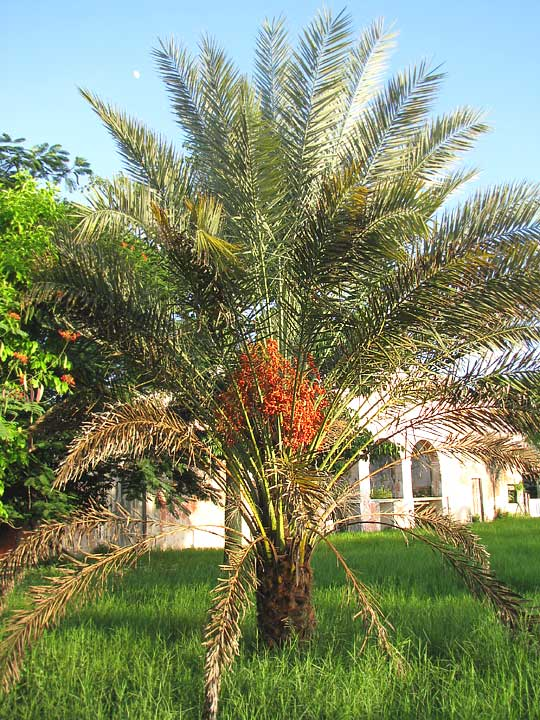
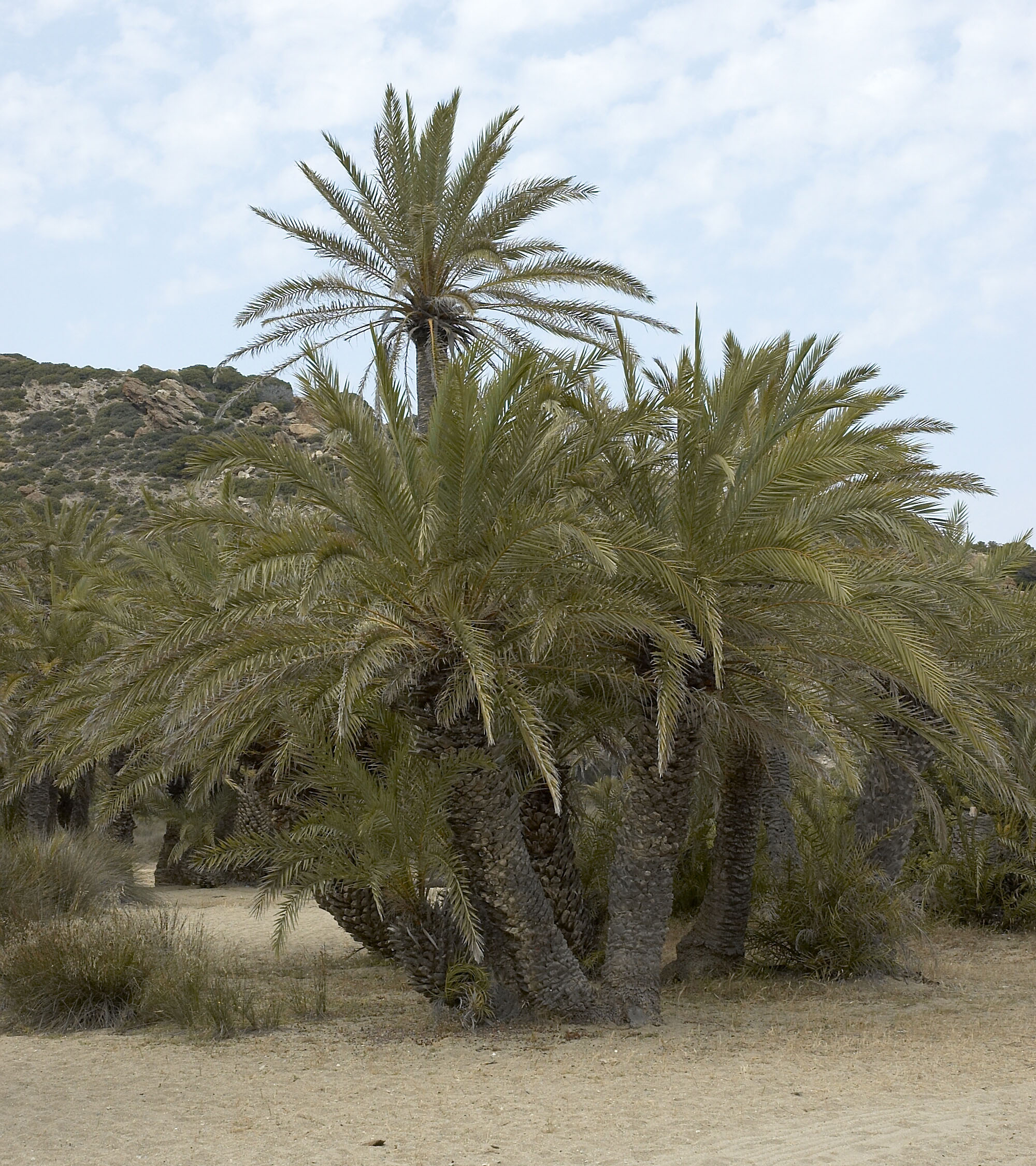
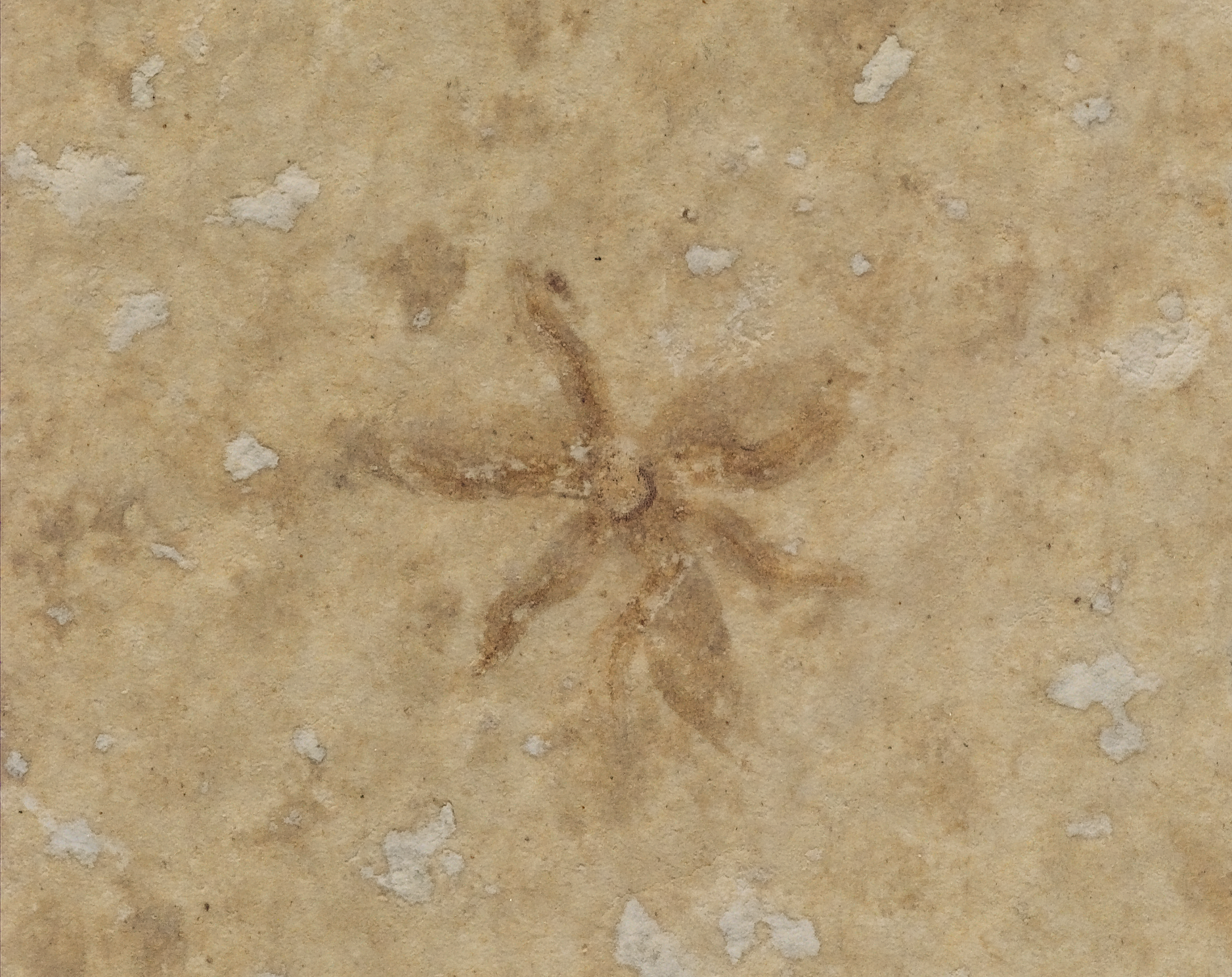
Image	Scientific name	Common name	Distribution
	Phoenix acaulis Roxb.	dwarf date palm	Himalayas
	Phoenix andamanensis S.C.Barrow	Andaman date palm	Andaman Islands
	Phoenix atlantica A.Chev.,	Cape Verde palm	endemic to the Cape Verde Islands, erroneously characterized as a feral P. dactylifera
	Phoenix caespitosa Chiov.	Horn of Africa date palm	Djibouti, Somalia, Saudi Arabia, Yemen, Oman
	Phoenix canariensis J. Benjamin Chabaud	Canary Island date palm	native to Canary Islands, naturalized in California, Nevada, Arizona, New Mexico, Texas, Florida, Mexico, Azores, Madeira, Spain, Portugal, Southern Europe, Cabo Verde, South Africa, Northern Africa, Middle East, India, Australia, New Zealand, Cuba, Puerto Rico, Bermuda
	Phoenix dactylifera L.	date palm	probably native to southwestern Asia, naturalized in Spain, Portugal, Azores, Madeira, Canary Islands, northern and western Africa, Mauritius, Réunion, China, India, Australia, Fiji, New Caledonia, California, Baja California, Sonora, El Salvador, Caribbean
	Phoenix loureiroi Kunth (syn. P. humilis)	Loureiro's date palm	China, India, Himalayas, Indochina, Philippines
	Phoenix paludosa Roxb.	mangrove date palm	Indian Subcontinent, Indochina, Sumatra, Andaman & Nicobar Islands
	Phoenix pusilla Gaertn.	Ceylon date palm	India, Sri Lanka
	Phoenix reclinata Jacq.	Senegal date palm	Africa, Comoros, Madagascar, Arabian Peninsula
	Phoenix roebelenii O'Brien	pygmy date palm	Yunnan, Indochina
	Phoenix rupicola T.Anderson	cliff date palm	Assam, Bhutan, Arunachal Pradesh, naturalized in Andaman Islands and West Indies
	Phoenix sylvestris (L.) Roxb.	Indian date palm	Indian Subcontinent, Myanmar; naturalized in southern China and the West Indies
	Phoenix theophrasti Greuter	Cretan date palm	Turkey, Greek Islands
	†Phoenix windmillis Allen		Green River Formation, US

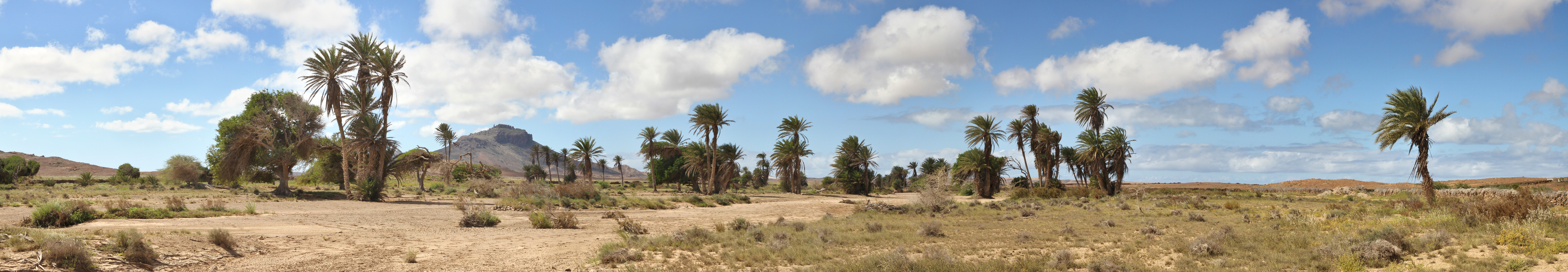
View of an oasis-like area, in central western Boa Vista, Cape Verde islands, with date palms

== Fossil record ==
A large number of fossil woods with anatomical features resembling the genus Phoenix have been excavated from Deccan Intertrappean formation in India of Maastrichtian–Danian age (65–67 my). Discovery of biocompounds from the fossil woods have affinity with the biocompounds known from modern Phoenix species.

A Phoenix seed from the latest Paleocene has been excavated from the Petit Pâtis quarry in Rivecourt, France.
