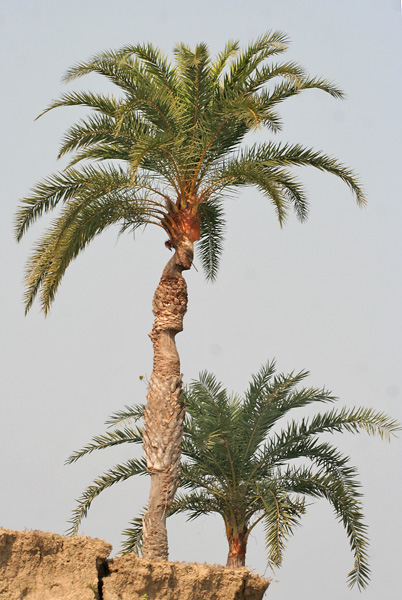
- In West Bengal, India

Scientific classification
- Kingdom: Plantae
- Clade: Tracheophytes
- Clade: Angiosperms
- Clade: Monocots
- Clade: Commelinids
- Order: Arecales
- Family: Arecaceae
- Genus: Phoenix
- Species: P. sylvestris

Binomial name
- Phoenix sylvestris (L.) Roxb.

Synonyms
- Elate sylvestris L.; Elate versicolor Salisb.

= Phoenix sylvestris =

Species of flowering plant in the palm family Arecaceae

Phoenix sylvestris (sylvestris - Latin, of the forest) also known as silver date palm, Indian date, sugar date palm or wild date palm, is a species of flowering plant in the palm family native to southern Pakistan, most of India, Nepal, Bhutan, Myanmar and Bangladesh. It has been introduced to southeastern China, Sri Lanka, Mauritius, Puerto Rico and the Leeward Islands. Growing in plains and scrubland up to 1300 m above sea level, the fruit from this palm species is used to make wine and jelly. The sap is tapped and drunk fresh or fermented into toddy. The fresh sap is boiled to make palm jaggery in West Bengal state of India and Bangladesh.

Preparing to collect sap at Jessore, Bangladesh

== Description ==
Phoenix sylvestris ranges from 4 to 15 m (13 to 49 ft) in height and 40 cm (16 in) in diameter; not as large as the Canary Island date palm, but nearly so, and resembling it. The leaves are 3 m (9.8 ft) long, gently recurved, on 1 m (3.3 ft) petioles with acanthophylls near the base. The leaf crown grows to 10 m (33 ft) wide and 7.5 to 10 m (25 to 33 ft) tall containing up to 100 leaves. The inflorescence grows to 1 metre with white, unisexual flowers forming to a large, pendent infructescence. The single-seeded fruit ripens to a purple-red colour.

== Gallery ==
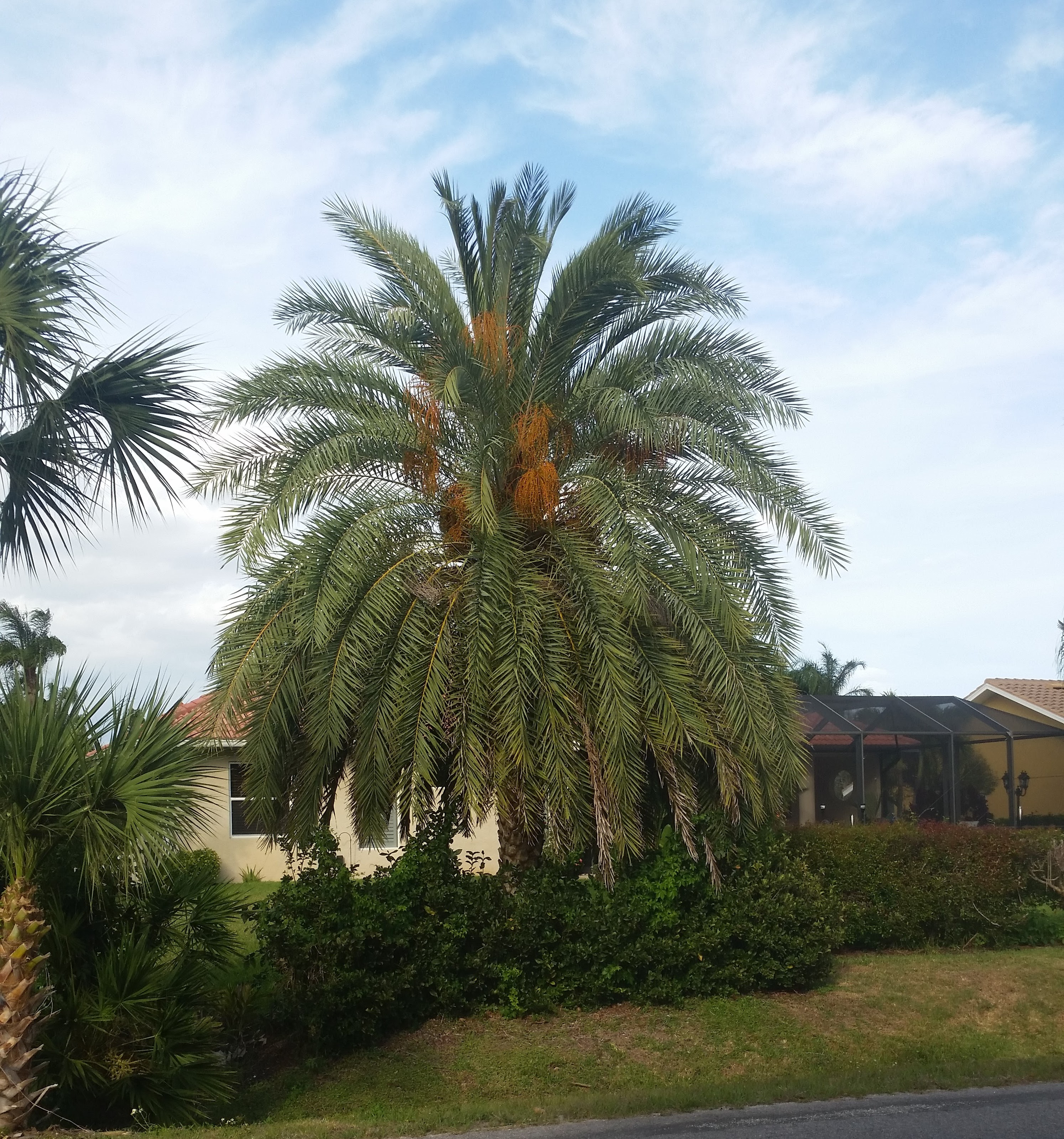
Growing in Englewood Florida

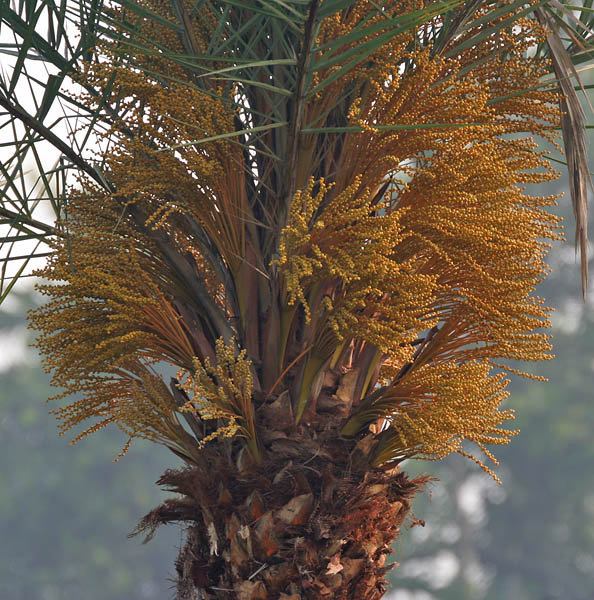
Female flowers at Narendrapur near Kolkata, West Bengal, India

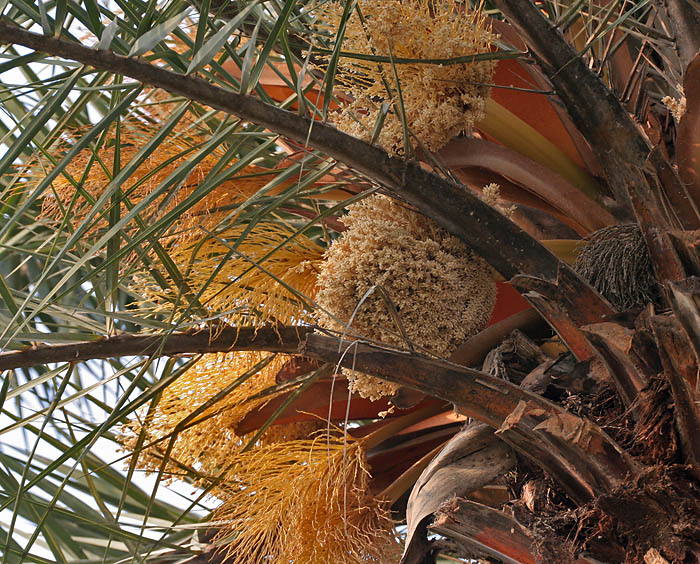
Male flowers at Narendrapur near Kolkata, West Bengal, India

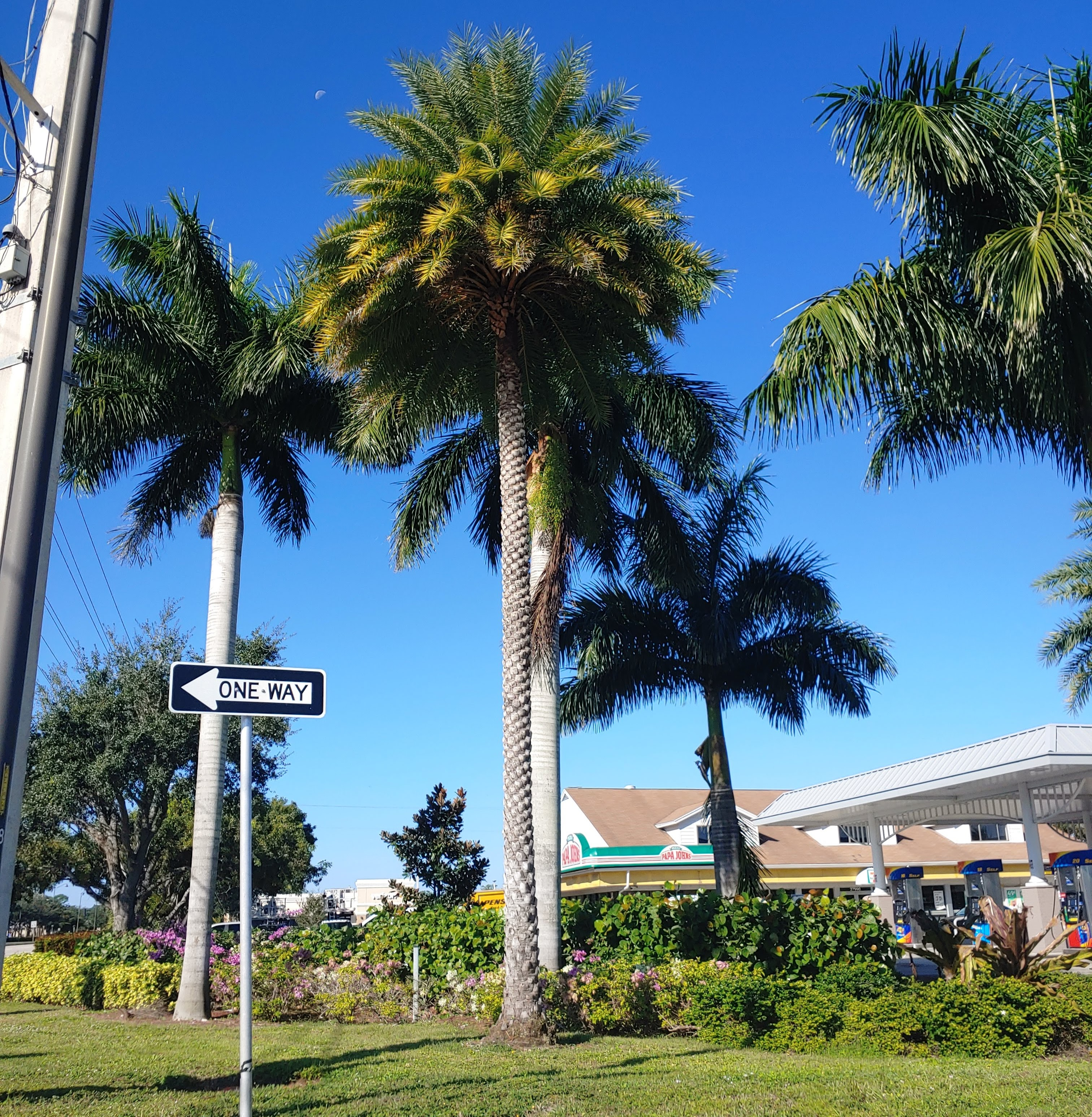
Mature specimen (center), Ft Myers, Florida

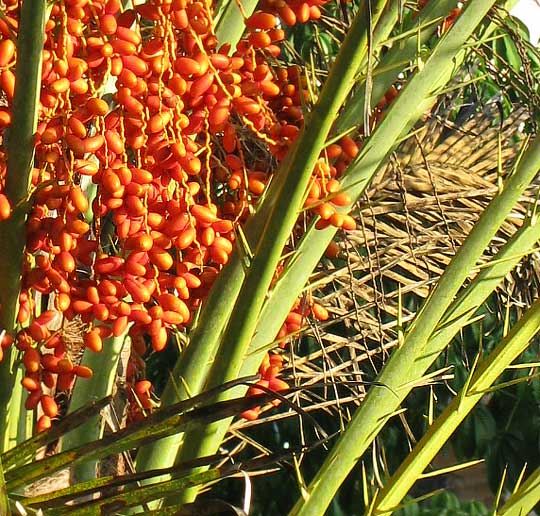
Fruits and spines in the Yucatán, Mexico

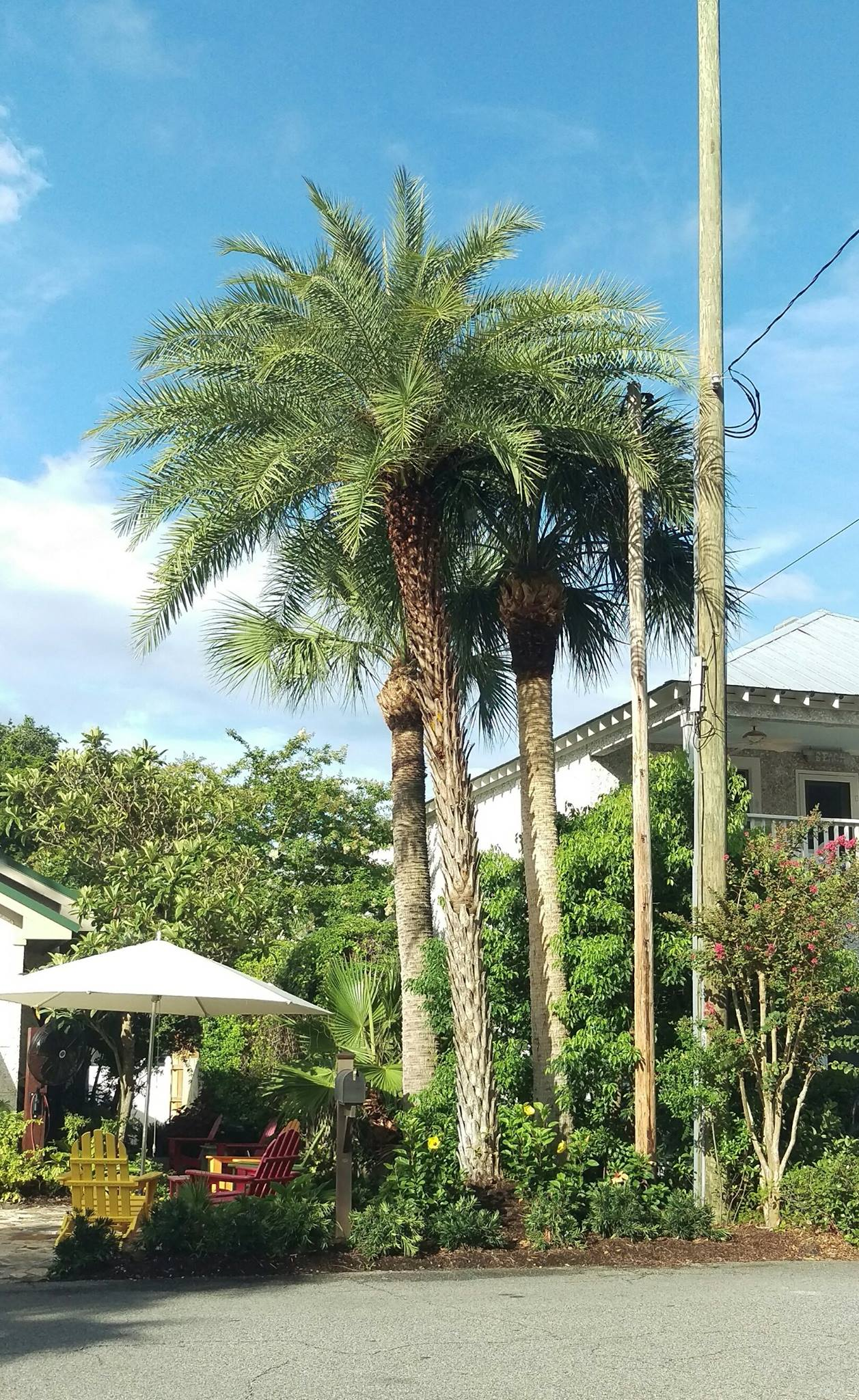
Growing on Saint Simons Island in Georgia, US

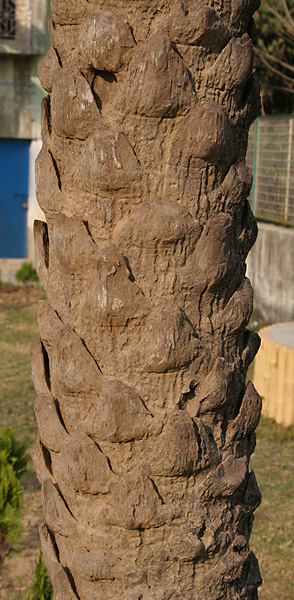
Lower trunk at Purbasthali in Bardhaman District of West Bengal, India

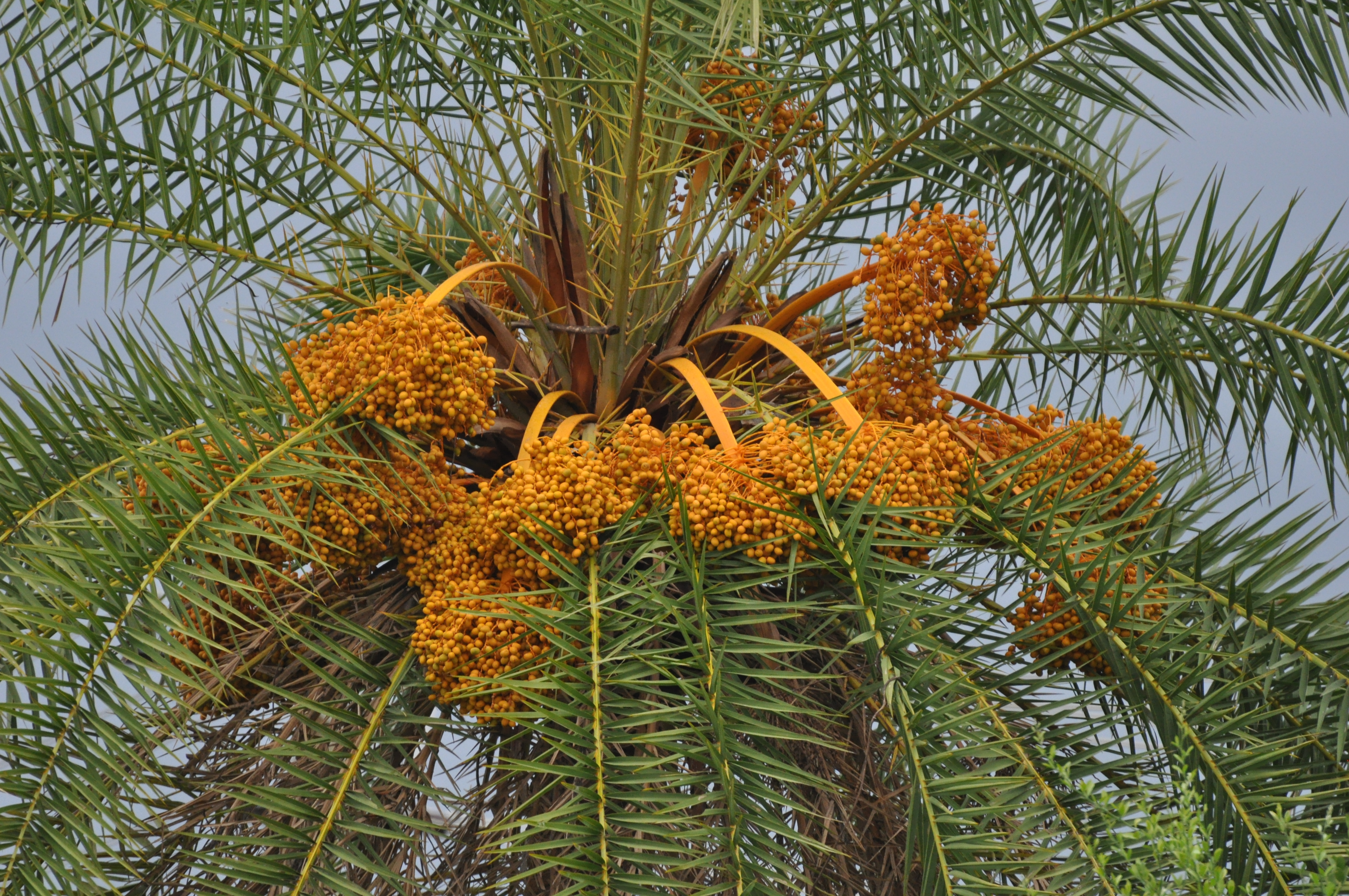
Fruits in Karnataka, India

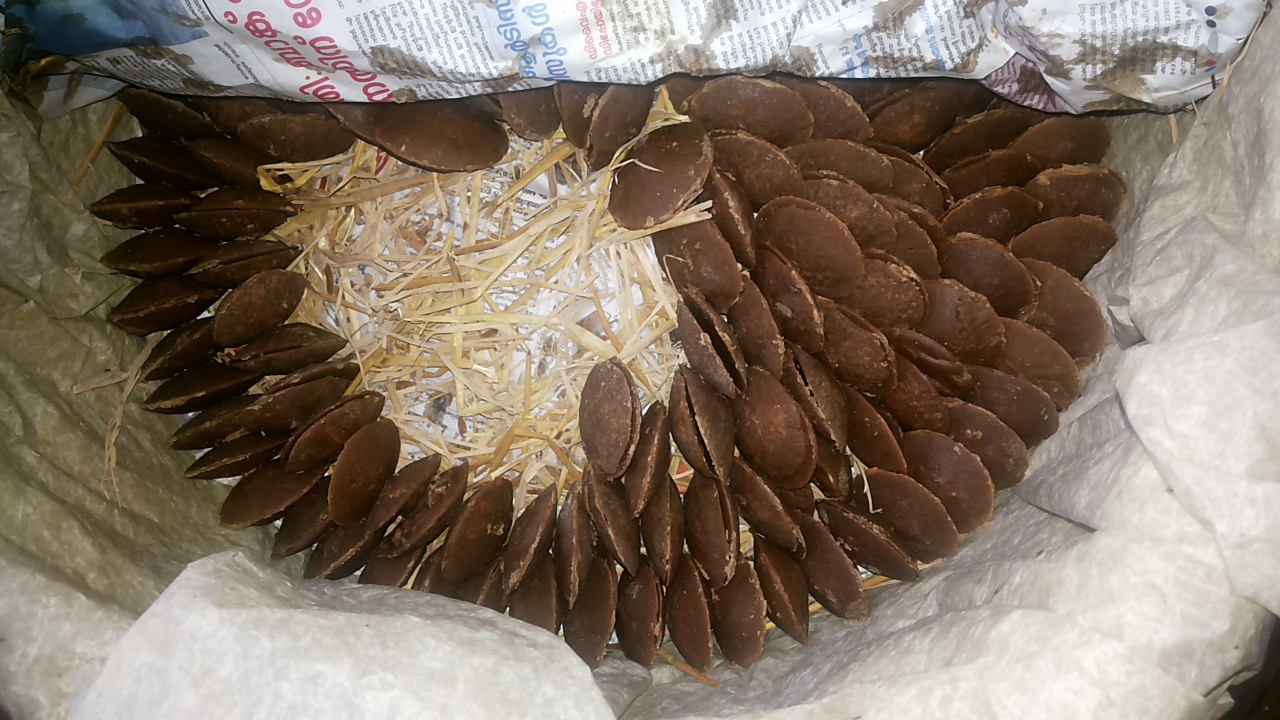
Palm sugar from Kerala (India) – traditional cottage industry

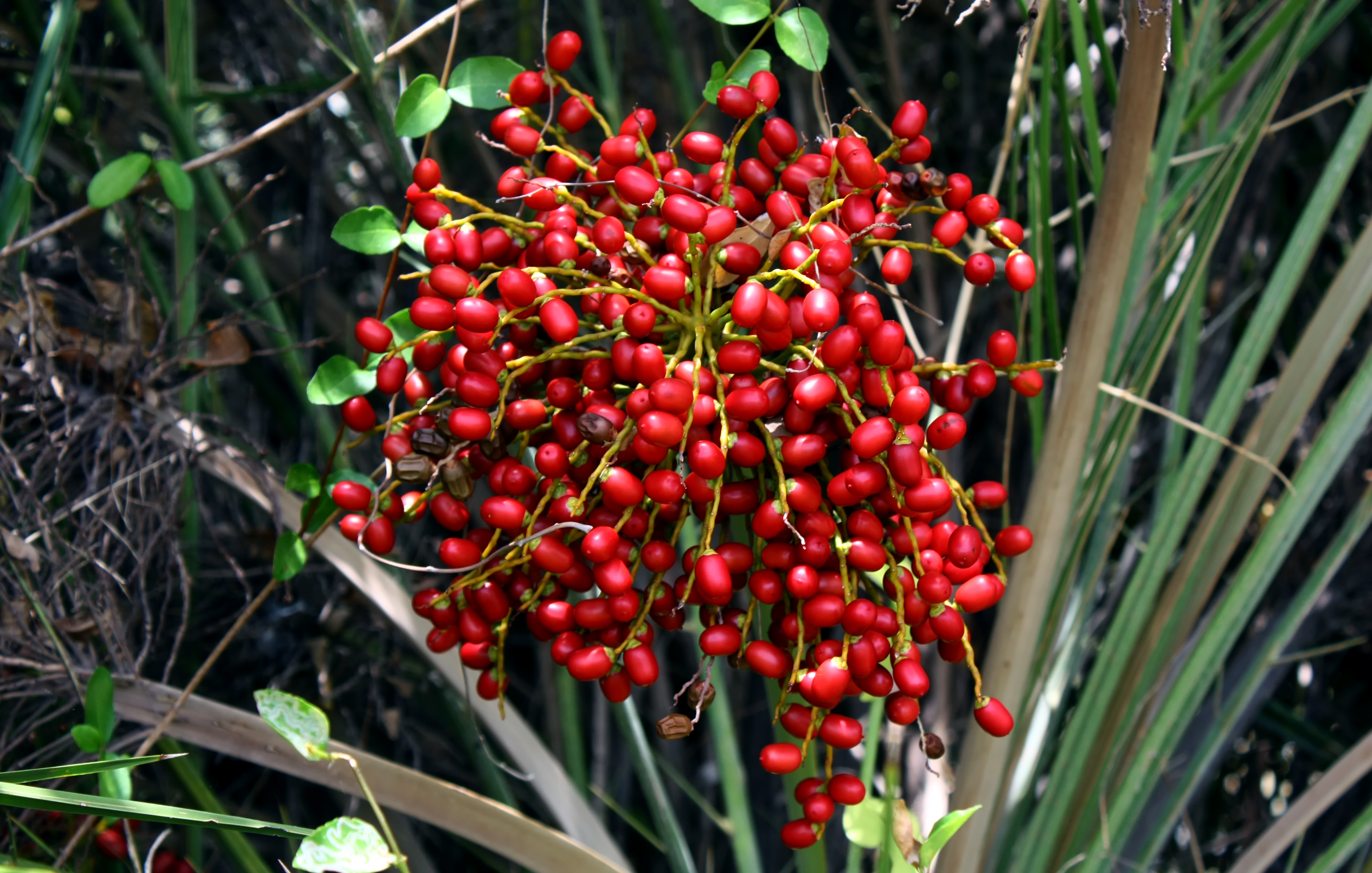
Fruits in Sri Lanka

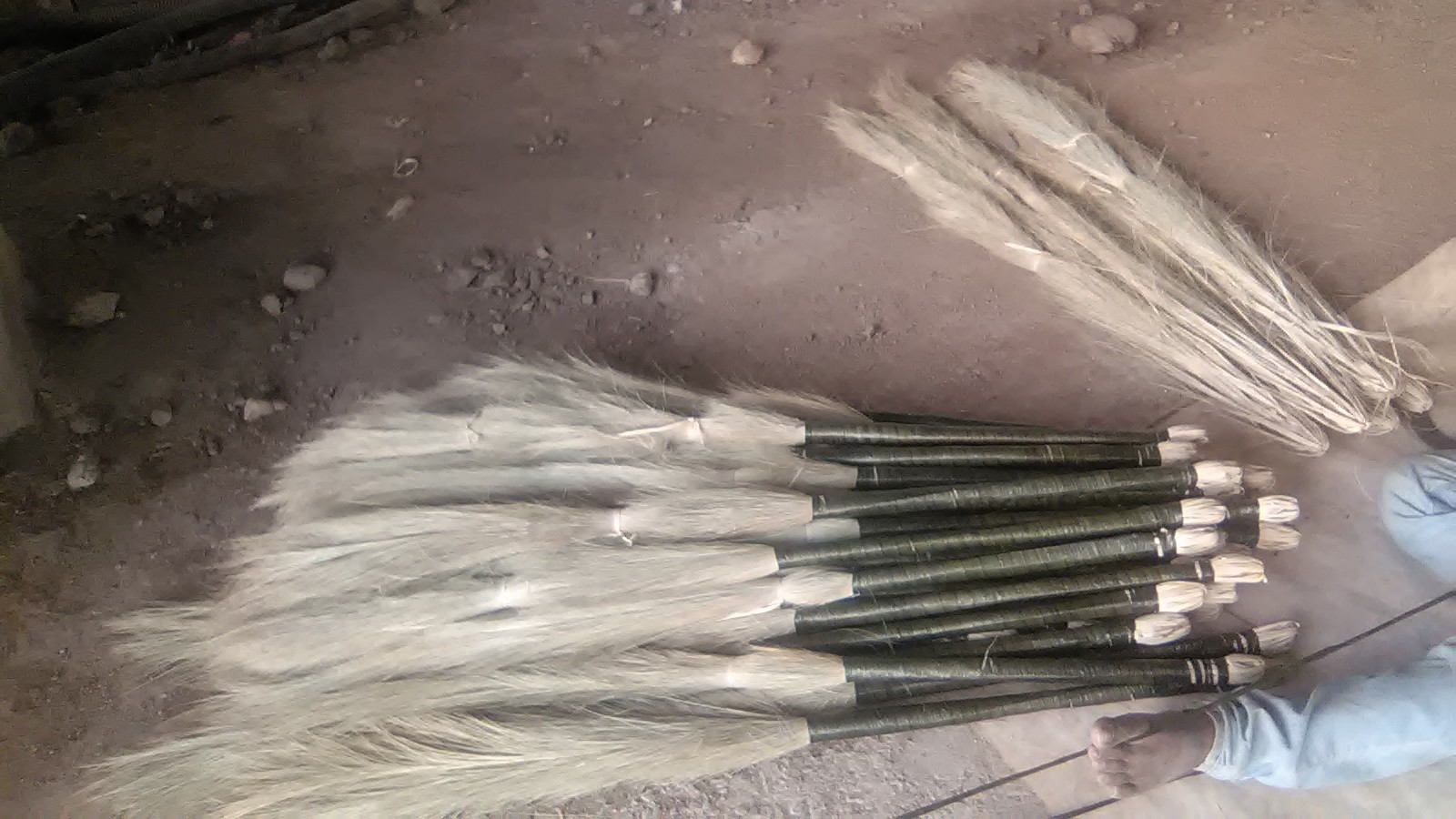
Brooms made of this tree, being sold in Hosur, Tamil Nadu, India
