= Phoenix andamanensis =

Scientific classification
- Kingdom: Plantae
- Clade: Tracheophytes
- Clade: Angiosperms
- Clade: Monocots
- Clade: Commelinids
- Order: Arecales
- Family: Arecaceae
- Genus: Phoenix
- Species: P. andamanensis

Binomial name
- Phoenix andamanensis S.Barrow

Species of palm

Phoenix andamanensis is a wild relative of date palm endemic to the Andaman Islands in the Bay of Bengal southwest of Myanmar. It is rather a newly described taxon by Sasha C. Barrow in 1998 based on old herbarium collections. This taxon was known only from a few herbarium collections and a few insignificant citations by Kurz in 1870, Brandis in 1906 and Parkinson in 1923. The Herbarium collections were made mostly during the British regime in 1903, 1904 and 1911 by Rogers and Osmaton. Later, Ellis from the Botanical Survey of India in 1990 collected one specimen from the Saddle Peak. The specimens were remained unidentified at herbaria (K and CAL) until its circumscription as new taxon by Barrow in 1998.

Barrow had only secondary information about this species based on above specimens and old citations. Therefore, she annotated in her monograph on the Phoenix as "... Phoenix andamanensis has recorded from one locality each in both North Andaman and Little Andaman, and from Cinque and Rutland Islands. The modern distribution of the species is unknown". During an exploration among various islands of the Andaman Archipelago in 2014, two populations of this taxon from North Andaman at Kalpong and Saddle Peak have been located by Mathew (Mathew, 2016) and made germplasm collections. This species is evidently rare with limited individuals at both localities. A germplasm collection of this lesser known endangered endemic wild date palm from Kalpong Forests is well established in the Field gene Bank of JNTBGRI (Mathew, 2016).
