= Phoenix caespitosa =

Conservation status
- Least Concern (IUCN 3.1)

Scientific classification
- Kingdom: Plantae
- Clade: Tracheophytes
- Clade: Angiosperms
- Clade: Monocots
- Clade: Commelinids
- Order: Arecales
- Family: Arecaceae
- Genus: Phoenix
- Species: P. caespitosa

Binomial name
- Phoenix caespitosa Chiov.

Synonyms
- Phoenix arabica Burret

Species of palm

Phoenix caespitosa is a species of plant in the palm family native to the Arabian Peninsula and the Horn of Africa.

== Distribution and habitat ==
Phoenix caespitosa can be found in Djibouti, Somalia, Saudi Arabia, and Yemen, where it grows in dry wadis, semi-desert bushland, rocky crevices, and ravines. In Somalia it occurs at elevations as high as 900 m (3,000 ft) above sea level, and it may occur at elevations as high as 1,950 m (6,400 ft) in Saudi Arabia. In Yemen it is widespread, though scattered, across the escarpment at elevations between 400–1,200 m (1,300–3,900 ft) above sea level. It may be locally abundant in marshes, valleys, and alongside streams in dry areas.

== Description ==
Phoenix caespitosa is a stemless dwarf palm that often grows in clusters. The stiff, hairless leaves grow to 3 m (9.8 ft) long. The inflorescences measure around 40 cm (16 in) long. Fruits are spherical to egg-shaped, orange to purplish-brown in colour, and measure 10–16 mm (0.39–0.63 in) by 8–12 mm (0.31–0.47 in).
