= List of festivals in Tunisia =

Annual Tunisian festivals by month

Tunisia features many annual festivals, which are listed below sorted by month.

== A list of festivals in Tunisia by month ==
=== February ===
- International Instrumental Festival. Focuses on North African traditions – Tunis

=== March ===
- Octopus Festival – Kerkennah Islands
- Sousse Spring Festival. International arts festival including concerts, shows and theatre - Sousse
- Mawjoudin Queer Film Festival - Tunis
- Festival international des ksour sahariens. Culture of ksar dwellers - Tatouine (Mid of late March)
- Orange Blossom Festival – Menzel Bou Zelfa, Nabeul and Hammamet (March - April)

=== April ===
- Orange Blossom Festival – Menzel Bou Zelfa, Nabeul and Hammamet, Tunisia (March - April)
- Sbeitla's Spring International Festival - Sbeitla
- Folk Art Festival – Tatouine
- Festival of the Mountain Oases. Berber culture. – Midès, Tamezret. (Late April)
- Passover Festival – El-Ghriba Synagogue, Djerba. (April or May)

=== May ===
- Passover Festival – El-Ghriba Synagogue, Djerba. (April or May)
- The Jerid Festival – Nefta and surrounding towns
- Music Festival. Classical and pop music concerts – Sfax

=== June ===
- Falconry Festival – El Haouaria
- Arab Horse Festival – Sidi Bou Saïd
- International Malouf Music Festival – Testour
- Tabarka Jazz Festival - Tabarka (June - July)

=== July ===
- Tabarka Jazz Festival - Tabarka (June - July)
- Ulysses Festival. Song and dance festival with historic and mythological themes – Houmt Souk
- International Festival of Sbeitla - Sbeitla
- Mermaid Festival. Concerts and performances – Kerkennah Islands
- Carnival of Awussu. Parade – Sousse
- Hammamet International Festival. Music and theatre - Hammamet, Tunisia
- International Festival of Bizerte. Music, art, dance and food - Bizerte
- Nights of La Marsa. Music, theatre and ballet - La Marsa
- International Festival of Symphonic Music – Amphitheatre of El Jem
- International Festival of Carthage. Jazz, plays, dances, folk, and ballet - Carthage
- Plastic Arts Festival – Mahrès (Sfax) (July–August)

=== August ===
- Plastic Arts Festival – Mahrès (Sfax) (July–August)
- Sponge Festival – Zarzis
- Festival of Diving – Tabarka
- Festival International du Film Amateur de Kélibia (FIFAK) - Kélibia

=== September ===
- Chouftouhonna Festival - Tunis
- Coralis Festival of Underwater Photography – Tabarka
- Wine Festival – Grombalia
- Wheat Festival – Béja

=== October-December ===
- Carthage Film Festival (Journées cinématographiques de Carthage, JCC) - Tunis
- Date Harvest Festival – Kebili (November)
- International Oases Festival – Tozeur (November)
- International Festival of the Sahara. Dance, theatre, music - Douz (November–December)
- Sfax International Mediterranean Film Festival - Sfax (December)
