= Souk Lahad =

- Commune and town
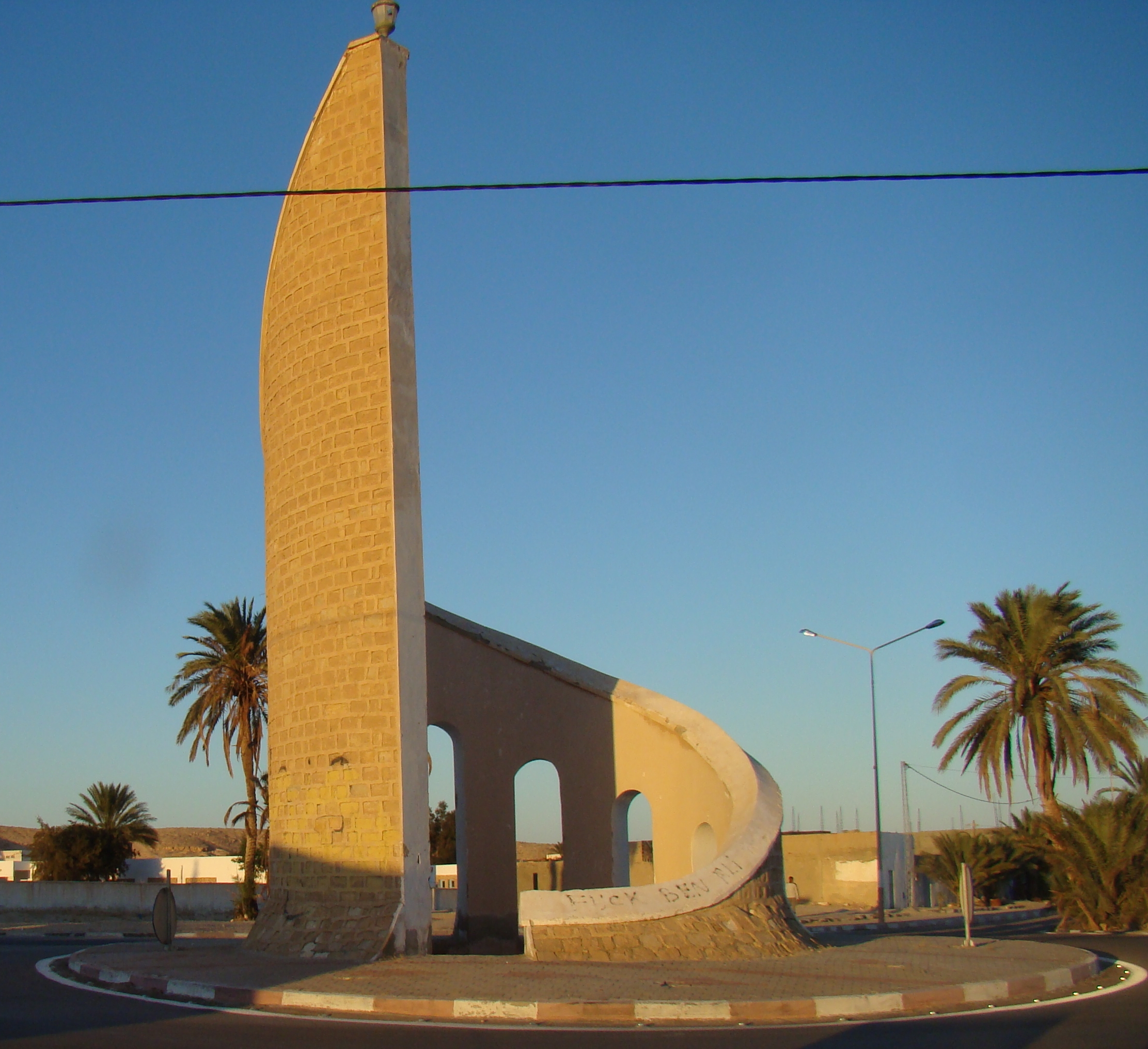
- Monument at eastern entry to Souk Lahad with anti-Ben Ali graffiti

- Location in Tunisia
- Coordinates: 33.788°N 8.793°E
- Country: Tunisia
- Governorate: Kébili Governorate

Government
  - Mayor: Ridha Maghzaoui (People’s Movement)

Population (2014)
  - Total: 18,983
- Time zone: UTC+1 (CET)

Souk Lahad (Arabic: سوق الأحد Sūq al Aḥad) is an oasis town and commune in the Kébili Governorate, Tunisia, about 15 kilometers northwest of the town of Kébili.

== Geography ==
It is located in the Nefzaoua region on the road from Kébili to Tozeur, just east of the point where the road begins its traversal of the Chott el-Jerid. It is the administrative seat of a delegation of the same name.

== Demographics ==
As of 2004 Soul Lahad had a population of 18,285.

== Economy ==
As suggested by its name—sūq al-aḥad means "Sunday market" in Arabic—the town developed as an agricultural community before light industry was introduced, as well as some tourism, with a luxury hotel.

== Gallery ==
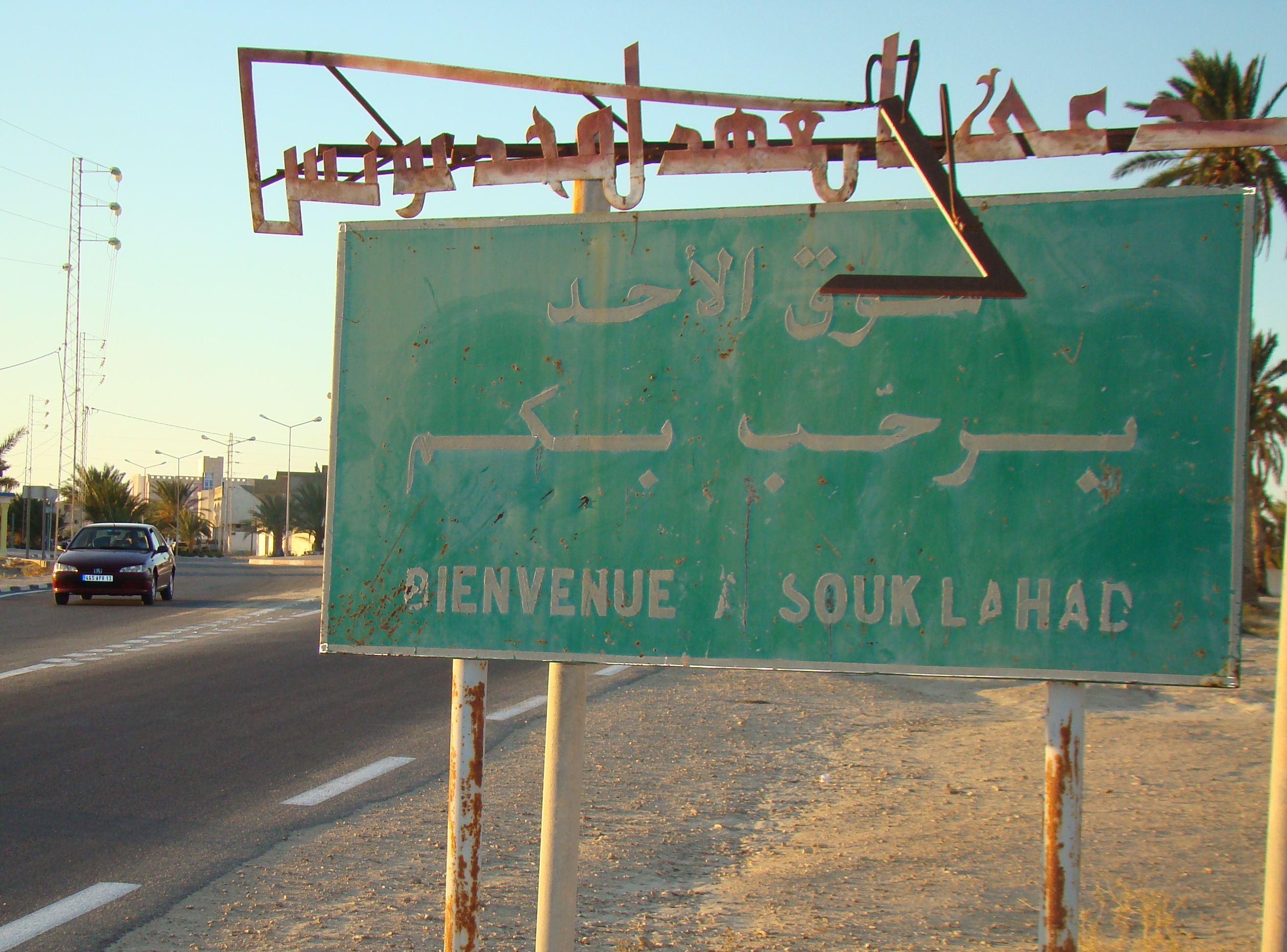
Welcome sign on arrival at Souk Lahad from Kebili.

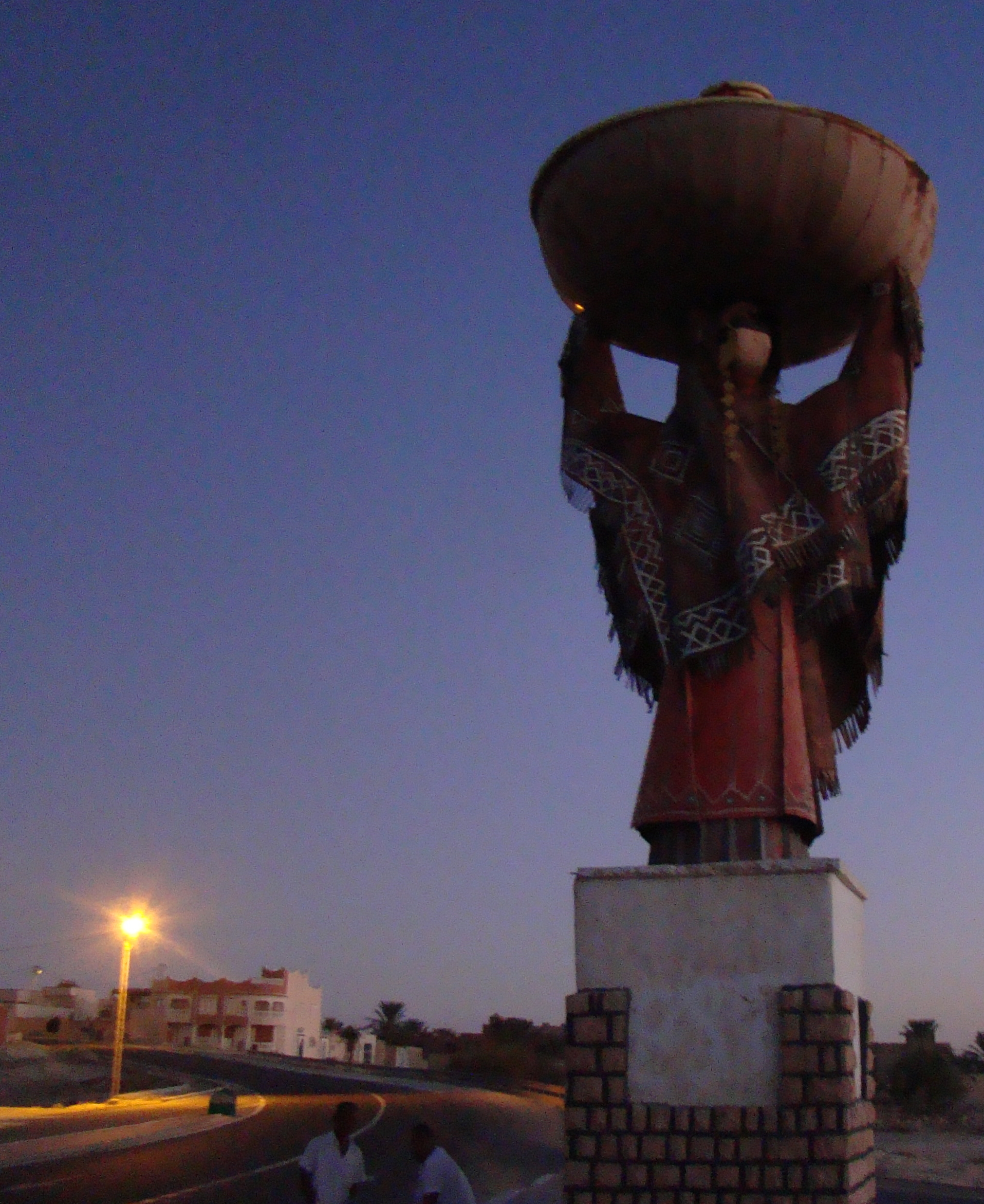
Statue at the western entrance to Souk Lahad depicting a local woman in traditional garb (here, seen from behind).

== See also ==
- Fatnassa
- List of cities in Tunisia
