= El Golâa =

- Commune and town
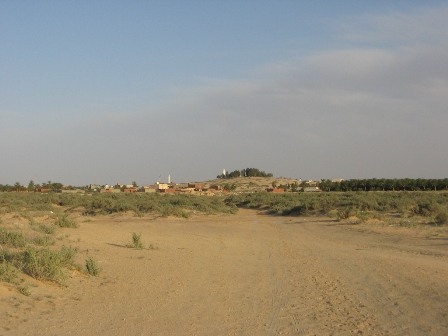

- Location in Tunisia
- Coordinates: 33.705°N 8.965°E
- Country: Tunisia
- Governorate: Kébili Governorate

Population (2022)
  - Total: 8,716
- Time zone: UTC+1 (CET)

El Golâa (Arabic: القلعة Al Qal'ah) is a village in southern Tunisia. It is located southeast of Chott el Djerid a few miles north of Douz in the region of Nefzaoua.

It is administratively attached to the Kebili Governorate, Tunisia. As of 2014, it had a population of 7,912.

Like many villages and towns surrounding its name provides information on the site. Here, El Golâa means "citadel" (like its namesake in the south of the Algeria). Indeed, the population of El Golâa originally occupied a high point relative to the plain surrounding. Estimated at 700 people at the end of the nineteenth century, it has steadily expanded its area of Habitat to hold down the hill and then the surrounding plain. As shown in the photo of the village, it remains at the top of the Hill as one mosques of the village (of which there are the minaret) and a public garden.

Given the absence of written sources, first-hand, it is difficult to define precisely the origins of the population of El Golâa. Several competing narratives about the origin and descent of Guelaouas (so that the villagers are called).

== Population ==
2014 Census (Municipal)
Homes	Families	Males	Females	Total
1892	1584	3892	4020	7912

== See also ==
- List of cities in Tunisia
