= Fatnassa =

Fatnassa فطناسة
- Location within Tunisia
- Coordinates: 33°47′00″N 08°45′0″E
- Country: Tunisia
- Governorate: Kébili
- Municipality: Souk Lahad

Fatnassa is a small village in the Kebili Governorate in the south west of Tunisia. It belongs to the municipality (commune) of Souk Lahad.

== Geography ==
The village is located by the southern shore of the Chott el Djerid, on the national highway RN16, crossing it. It is 13 km from Souk Lahad, 25 from Kébili, 52 from Degache, 54 from Douz and 68 from Tozeur.
