= Zdanow =

Zdanow may refer to the following places in Poland:

- Zdanów, Świętokrzyskie Voivodeship (south-central Poland)
- Zdanów, West Pomeranian Voivodeship (north-west Poland)
- Żdanów, Lower Silesian Voivodeship (south-west Poland)
- Żdanów, Lublin Voivodeship (east Poland)
