= Heinz-Edgar Berres =

German World War II flying ace (1920–1943)

- Born: 10 January 1920; Koblenz
- Died: 25 July 1943 (aged 23) over the Strait of Messina, Italy
- Cause of death: Killed in action
- Military career
- Allegiance: Nazi Germany
- Branch: Luftwaffe
- Service years: 1940–1943
- Rank: Hauptmann (captain)
- Unit: JG 77
- Conflicts: World War II: Siege of Malta; North African Campaign; Defence of the Reich; Italian Campaign †
- Awards: Knight's Cross of the Iron Cross

Heinz-Edgar Berres (10 January 1920 – 25 July 1943) was a Luftwaffe ace and recipient of the Knight's Cross of the Iron Cross during World War II. The Knight's Cross of the Iron Cross, and its variants were the highest awards in the military and paramilitary forces of Nazi Germany during World War II. Berres was shot down on 25 July 1943 over Sicily. Berres claimed 52 victories in 354 missions. He was posthumously awarded the Knight's Cross and promoted to Hauptmann.

== World War II ==
Berres was born on 10 January 1920 in Koblenz, at the time in the Rhine Province during the Occupation of the Rhineland. He was posted to 3.(J)./Lehrgeschwader 2—3rd Squadron (fighter) of Demonstration Wing 2, in the summer, 1941. Berres was posted to the Soviet Union in the latter stage of Operation Barbarossa. At 13:57 on 29 November, he claimed his first victory when he shot down a Tupolev SB. That day, I.(J)/LG 2 flew combat air patrol in the vicinity south of Rostov. On 1 December 1941, I.(J)/LG 2 began relocation to Mariupol in southeastern Ukraine while the II. Gruppe was sent to Germany for replenishment. On 29 December 1941, Berres claimed his second victory, a Polikarpov I-15 claimed at 10:20 in a mission to the port city Taganrog.

On 28 February 1942, Berres shot down a Polikarpov I-16 and a Polikarpov R-5 reconnaissance aircraft on 9 March 1942. On 24 March, he claimed a single I-16, and an I-61, a reference to the Mikoyan-Gurevich MiG-3, and 27 March, to surpass the 5-victory mark and become a flying ace with six victories.

The unit was re-designated 3. Staffel of Jagdgeschwader 77 (JG 77—Fighter Wing 77) on 6 January 1942 and in March 1942 he was transferred to 1./JG 77. Berres was transferred to Romania to defend its airspace from enemy incursions. On 12 June 1942, 13 Consolidated B-24 Liberators of the "Halverson project" (HALPRO) attacked Ploiești. Berres' Staffel was scrambled to intercept. Berres claimed one B-24D shot down.

=== Malta operations ===
1. Staffel moved to Sicily in June 1942. The fighter group was to engaged in fighter patrols and escort duties over Malta as Axis forces laid siege to the island. On 8 July 1942 Berres claimed his first—and 8th overall—over Malta. On this day he shot down Supermarine Spitfire BR108 of No. 603 Squadron RAF flown by Flight Lieutenant L.V Sanders. On 18 July 1942 Berres claimed a Spitfire for his 10th victory while escorting Junkers Ju 88 bombers. JG 77 claimed two and I./Jagdgeschwader 53 claimed one. The other claimant was Siegfried Freytag who claimed his 60th victory. No. 126 Squadron RAF lost Flight Lieutenant Charles B. MacLean in BR323 badly wounded. Pilot Officer C. H. Latimer BR170 was wounded but managed to land after his Spitfire was badly damaged by a Bf 109. On 15 September 1942 Berres downed BP867 of 249 Squadron, flown by Flight Sergeant Bernard Peters who was killed. On 24 September 1942 Berres shot down EP136 piloted by Pilot Officer Moody of No. 249 Squadron RAF for his 14th victory. Berres achieved four victories in October 1942 as the Luftwaffe made its last major effort over the island before the end of the siege. By the end of operations Berres has accounted for 18 Allied aircraft—11 over Malta.

=== North Africa ===
On 8 November 1942 Operation Torch began and Allied forces invaded Vichy French Morocco and Algeria. The Germans and Italians allocated large forces to prevent the Allied advance into Tunisia. The Run for Tunis was a success, and the fall of the country into Allied hands was prevented. JG 77 was among the units sent from Sicily to support the Axis forces in the Tunisian Campaign. On 1 November Berres claimed a Curtiss P-40 Warhawk over Bir-el-Abd, and other on 3 November northwest of Quotaifiya, and at 10:31 on 11 November 1942 he claimed another over Marble Arch. On 7 December Berres claimed a Martin Baltimore west of El Haseiat. The aircraft was from 60 Squadron SAAF, part of the 1437 Strategic Recce Flight. The 11 December claim for a P-40 east of Ras Umm el Gavanigh was the Hawker Hurricane from 40 Squadron SAAF piloted by Lieutenant Shepherd. Berres' last victory of 1942 was a Spitfire over El Agheila on 14 December. The claim was his 25th aerial victory.

On 8 and 14 January 1943, he claimed a solitary victory over a Spitfire fighter and North American B-25 Mitchell bomber respectively. On 4 February 1943, Berres claimed two Lockheed P-38 Lightning fighters and a B-25 on the 8 February. On 26 February he accounted for a pair of P-40s. In the following weeks the British Army prepared to assault the Mareth Line which began on the Battle of the Mareth Line. On 7 March 1943 Berres engaged Spitfires over the frontline and claimed it shot down for his 33rd victory. At noon on 10 March Berres formed part of 30 Bf 109s from JG 77 committed to escorting 15 Junkers Ju 87s from Sturzkampfgeschwader 3 (StG 3). RAF units intercepted and shot down and killed Stuka pilot Leutnant Heinz Üldemann. JG 77 took a toll of the RAF fighters, nine of which were claimed destroyed. Berres claimed his 34th victory in the air battle. On 17 March Berres claimed another spitfire. The following day Berres claimed JG 77's only victory—a reconnaissance Spitfire of No. 680 Squadron RAF. On 24 March—the day after the loss of Geschwaderkommodore Joachim Müncheberg—13 Bf 109s of Berres' I./JG 77 intercepted 18 B-25 bombers from the 321st Bombardment Group escorted by the 57th and 58th Fighter Group. Berres claimed a P-40, then a B-25, followed by another P-40 in 11 minutes. The Germans claimed seven American aircraft for one wounded, one killed and one captured. Berres had achieved his 37th, 38th and 39th victories. On 2 April Berres scrambled with 3./JG 77 and after claiming his 40th victory over a P-40 was shot down near Oudref but escaped back to German lines.

On 7 April the British 1st Armoured Division and US II Corps linked up east of Gabes. That evening the British IX Corps broke into the Fondouk Pass and the British 128th Infantry Brigade seized Pichon. However the American 34th Infantry Division was repulsed at Djebel Aouareb. In the large air battles Berres shot down a Spitfire flown by Flight Sergeant G. W. Sweeney of 601 Squadron. The last success was claimed over the collapsing front on 5 May 1943. The P-40 was Berres' 44th victory.

=== Death ===
From 10:40 to 11:20 on 25 July 1943, seven Bf 109s from I. Gruppe of JG 77 and five Bf 109s from I. Gruppe of Jagdgeschwader 27 were ordered to provide fighter escort to ten Junkers Ju 52 from I. Gruppe of Transportgeschwader 1 (TG 1—1st Transport Wing). The Ju 52s had been tasked with resupplying German forces on the northern coast of Sicily. Roughly 20 kilometres (12 miles) east of Milazzo, the escort fighters came under attack by about 30 Spitfires while further fighters engaged the Ju 52s. During this encounter, all ten Ju 52s were shot down over the Gulf of Saint Euphemia. JG 77 suffered four Bf 109s shot down with three pilots escaping unharmed and one pilot killed in action. Berres died in his Bf 109 G-6 (Werknummer 18 101—factory number) "BF+QU", shot down near Milazzo. Berres had become a victim of No. 322 Wing RAF led by Colin Falkland Gray. Berres was posthumously promoted to Hauptmann and awarded the Knight's Cross of the Iron Cross (Ritterkreuz des Eisernen Kreuzes) on 19 September 1943.

== Summary of career ==
=== Aerial victory claims ===
According to US historian David T. Zabecki, Berres was credited with 53 aerial victories. Obermaier lists him with 52 aerial victories, including six on the Eastern Front, claimed in 354 combat missions. One claim was unconfirmed. Mathews and Foreman, authors of Luftwaffe Aces — Biographies and Victory Claims, researched the German Federal Archives and found records for 49 aerial victory claims, plus three further unconfirmed claims. This figure includes three aerial victories on the Eastern Front and 46 over the Western Allies, including two four-engined bombers.

Chronicle of aerial victories
This and the – (dash) indicates unwitnessed aerial victory claims for which Berres did not receive credit. This and the ? (question mark) indicates information discrepancies listed by Prien, Stemmer, Rodeike, Bock, Mathews and Foreman.
Claim	Date	Time	Type	Location	Unit	Claim	Date	Time	Type	Location	Unit
– Claims with I. (Jagd) Gruppe of Lehrgeschwader 2 – Operation Barbarossa — 22 June – 5 December 1941
1	29 November 1941	13:57	SB-3	Rostov-on-Don	3.(J)/LG 2						
– Claims with I. Gruppe of Jagdgeschwader 77 – Eastern Front — 6 December 1941 – 28 April 1942
2? (Note: According to Mathews and Foreman this claim is unconfirmed.)	29 December 1941	10:20	I-15	Krivaja	1.(J)/LG 2	5	24 March 1942	13:45	I-16	southwest of Krasnyi Lyman	1./JG 77
3?	28 February 1942	12:05	I-16	southeast of Jama	1./JG 77	6?	27 March 1942	06:40	I-61 (MiG-3)	north of Sslawjanskaja	1./JG 77
4	9 March 1942	10:05	R-5	Barvinkove	1./JG 77						
– Claims with I. Gruppe of Jagdgeschwader 77 – Eastern Front — 1 May – 30 June 1942
7	12 June 1942	05:28	B-24	south of Brăila	1./JG 77						
– Claims with I. Gruppe of Jagdgeschwader 77 – Sicily — 1 July – October 1942
8	8 July 1942	06:48	Spitfire	west of Luqa	1./JG 77	14	25 September 1942	11:42	Spitfire	Valletta	1./JG 77
9	9 July 1942	19:20	Spitfire	south of Marsa Scirocco	1./JG 77	15	6 October 1942	11:11	Spitfire	north of Valletta	Stab I./JG 77
10	18 July 1942	14:54	Spitfire	north of Valletta	1./JG 77	16	13 October 1942	10:45	Spitfire	Valletta	Stab I./JG 77
11	22 July 1942	11:39	Spitfire	east of Valletta	1./JG 77	17	14 October 1942	08:07	Spitfire	northeast of Valletta	Stab I./JG 77
12	23 July 1942	16:44	Spitfire	northeast of Valletta	1./JG 77	18	17 October 1942	13:33	Spitfire	Luqa	Stab I./JG 77
13	15 September 1942	18:10	Spitfire	Ras il Kamieh	1./JG 77						
– Claims with I. Gruppe of Jagdgeschwader 77 – North Africa — November – 31 December 1942
19	1 November 1942	08:15	P-40	south of El Bahrein	Stab I./JG 77	23	11 December 1942	15:35	P-40	east of Ras Umm er Garanigh	Stab I./JG 77
20	3 November 1942	15:57	P-40	northwest of Quotafiya	Stab I./JG 77	24	13 December 1942	12:50	Spitfire	west of airfield Acro Philaenorum	Stab I./JG 77
21	11 November 1942	09:31	P-40	northeast of Bir-el-Acra	Stab I./JG 77	25	14 December 1942	11:22	P-40	west of El Agheila	Stab I./JG 77
22	7 December 1942	15:40	Baltimore	west of El Haseiat	Stab I./JG 77						
– Claims with I. Gruppe of Jagdgeschwader 77 – North Africa — 1 January – May 1943
26	8 January 1943	13:07	Spitfire	northeast of Dor Umn er Rami	Stab I./JG 77	36	18 March 1943	13:18	Spitfire	southeast of Mareth	3./JG 77
27	14 January 1943	10:45	B-25	north of Tamet	Stab I./JG 77	37	24 March 1943	09:55	P-40	northwest of Fatnassa	3./JG 77
28	4 February 1943	14:42	P-38	west of Matmata	Stab I./JG 77	38	24 March 1943	09:58	B-25	northwest of Fatnassa	3./JG 77
29	4 February 1943	14:42	P-38	west of Matmata	Stab I./JG 77	39	24 March 1943	10:06	P-40	northwest of Fatnassa	3./JG 77
30	8 February 1943	12:50	B-25	west-southwest of Fatnassa	Stab I./JG 77	40	2 April 1943	11:50	P-40	east of Cekhira	1./JG 77
31	26 February 1943	14:03	P-40	northwest of Medenine	Stab I./JG 77	41	7 April 1943	08:07	Spitfire	northeast of La Fauconnerie	3./JG 77
32	26 February 1943	17:02	P-40	south of Gabès	Stab I./JG 77	42	16 April 1943	15:48	Spitfire	northeast of La Fauconnerie	3./JG 77
33	7 March 1943	14:44	Spitfire	southeast of Medenine	Stab I./JG 77	43	22 April 1943	17:38	Spitfire	south of Mateur	1./JG 77
34	10 March 1943	16:34	P-40	south-southwest of Medenine	3./JG 77	44	5 May 1943	16:46	P-40	northeast of Tunis	1./JG 77
35	17 March 1943	13:23	Spitfire	southwest of Mareth	3./JG 77						
– Claims with I. Gruppe of Jagdgeschwader 77 – Italy — July 1943
—	1 July 1943	—	Spitfire		1./JG 77	49	3 July 1943	11:02	B-25	southwest of Trapani	1./JG 77
45	2 July 1943	07:58	P-40	west of Castelvetrano	1./JG 77	50	4 July 1943	10:31	Boston	northwest of Sciacca	1./JG 77
46	2 July 1943	08:10	P-40	southwest of Cap Granitola	1./JG 77	51	5 July 1943	11:24	B-17	west-southwest of Gerbini Airfield	1./JG 77
47	2 July 1943	14:35	Spitfire	north of Valletta	1./JG 77	52	24 July 1943	11:30	P-51	5 km (3.1 mi) south of Cesarò	1./JG 77
48	2 July 1943	14:57	Spitfire	north of Valletta	1./JG 77						

=== Awards ===
- Iron Cross (1939) 2nd and 1st Class
- Honor Goblet of the Luftwaffe on 25 January 1943 as Leutnant and pilot
- German Cross in Gold on 16 February 1943 as Leutnant in the 1./Jagdgeschwader 77
- Knight's Cross of the Iron Cross on 19 September 1943 as Oberleutnant and Staffelkapitän of 1./Jagdgeschwader 77
