= Desert festival =

Desert festival generically refers to festivals located in a desert, specifically may refer to:

- Burning Man in the United States
- Dubai Desert Rock Festival in the United Arab Emirates
- Festival in the Desert in Mali
- International Festival of the Sahara in Tunisia
- Rajasthan desert festival in Rajasthan, India
