= Jemna, Poland =

Jemna
- Village
- Location within Poland
- Coordinates: 50°35′39″N 16°39′08″E
- Country: Poland
- Voivodeship: Lower Silesian
- County: Ząbkowice
- Gmina: Stoszowice
- Time zone: UTC+1 (CET)
  - Summer (DST): UTC+2 (CEST)
- Vehicle registration: DZA

Jemna [ˈjɛmna] is a village in the administrative district of Gmina Stoszowice, within Ząbkowice County, Lower Silesian Voivodeship, in southwestern Poland.
