= Różana, Ząbkowice County =

Różana
- Village
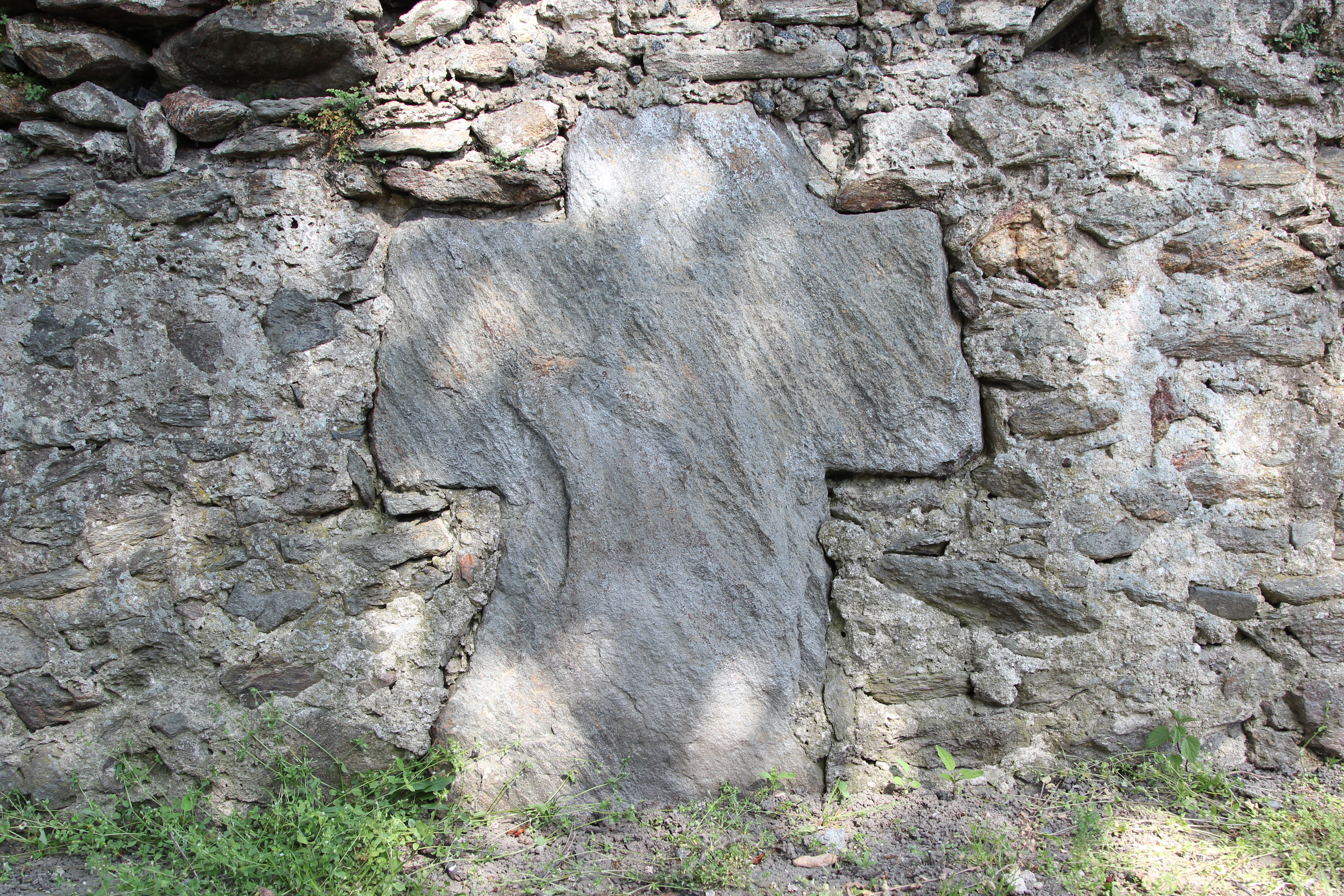
- Stone cross

- Location within Poland
- Coordinates: 50°38′N 16°41′E
- Country: Poland
- Voivodeship: Lower Silesian
- County: Ząbkowice
- Gmina: Stoszowice

Różana [ruˈʐana] ((German: Rosenbach) is a village in the administrative district of Gmina Stoszowice, within Ząbkowice County, Lower Silesian Voivodeship, in south-western Poland.

== History ==
After the Second World War, Polish rule was established over Silesia. Local Germans, unaware of the political decisions until then, were evicted starting from February 1946. On Palm Sunday 1946, it was Rosenbach's turn for eviction. Polish militia surrounded the village in the morning, and in the afternoon, Germans had 20 minutes to prepare for eviction. This event was followed by several further rounds of eviction.
