= Budzów-Kolonia =

- Village
- Location within Poland
- Coordinates: 50°33′36″N 16°42′32″E
- Country: Poland
- Voivodeship: Lower Silesian
- County: Ząbkowice
- Gmina: Stoszowice

Budzów-Kolonia [ˈbud͡zuf kɔˈlɔɲa] is a village in the administrative district of Gmina Stoszowice, within Ząbkowice County, Lower Silesian Voivodeship, in south-western Poland.
