= Sbeitla's Spring Festival =

Folklore festival in Tunisia

Sbeitla's Spring International Festival
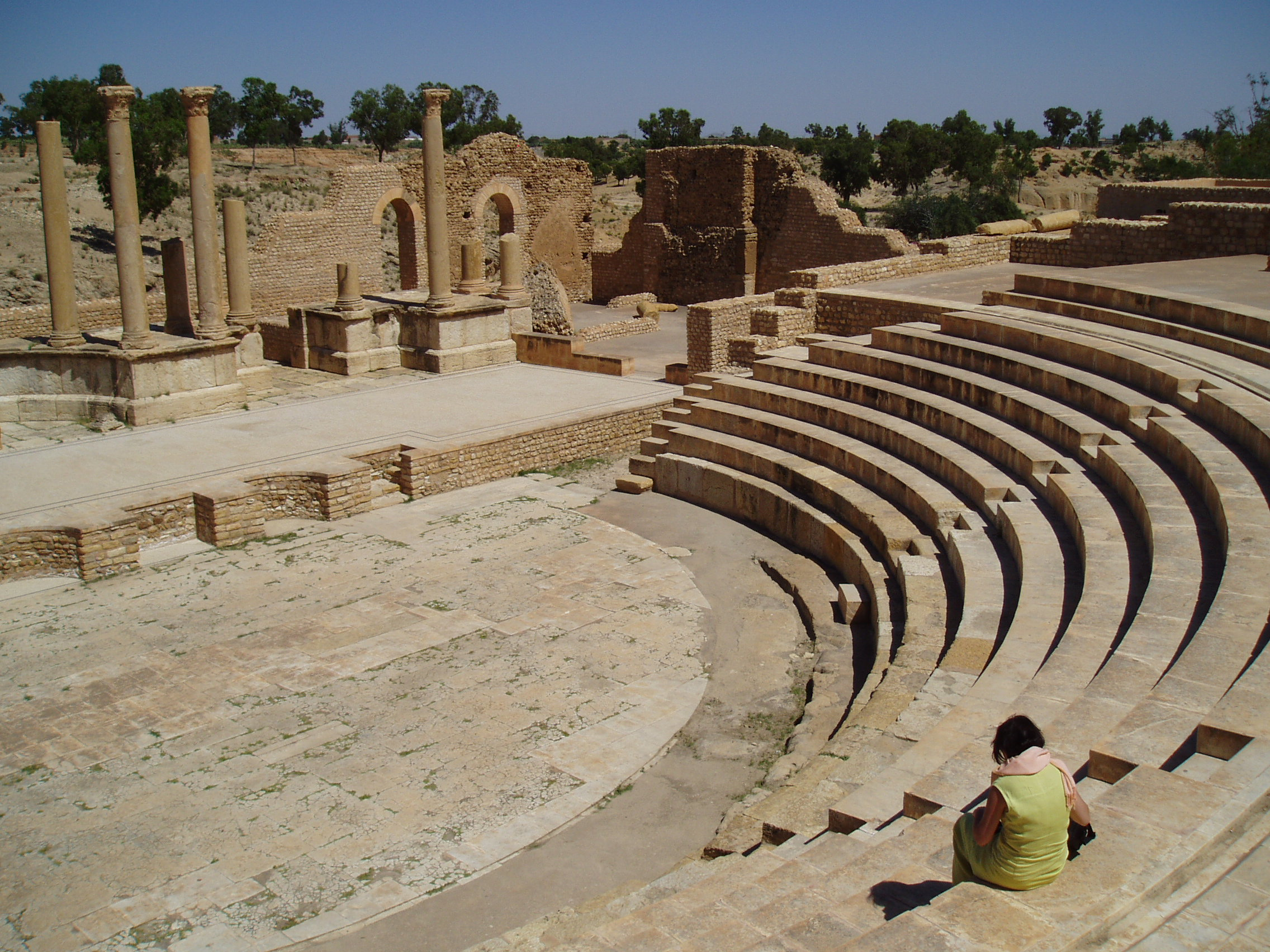
- Sbeitla ancient Roman theatre
- Locations: Sbeitla, Tunisia
- Years active: since 2000
- Founded: 2000
- Patron: Adnen Helali
- Website: http://www.printemps-sbeitla.com/

The Sbeitla's Spring International Festival (Arabic: مهرجان ربيع سبيطلة الدولي), is an annual festival held in Sbeitla, Tunisia, since 2000. The events take place at the Sbeitla ancient Roman theatre and the festival features colourful performances of folklore troupes and poetry from Tunisia, and Arab and European countries.

== See also ==
- List of festivals in Tunisia
