= Festival international de musique symphonique d'El Jem =

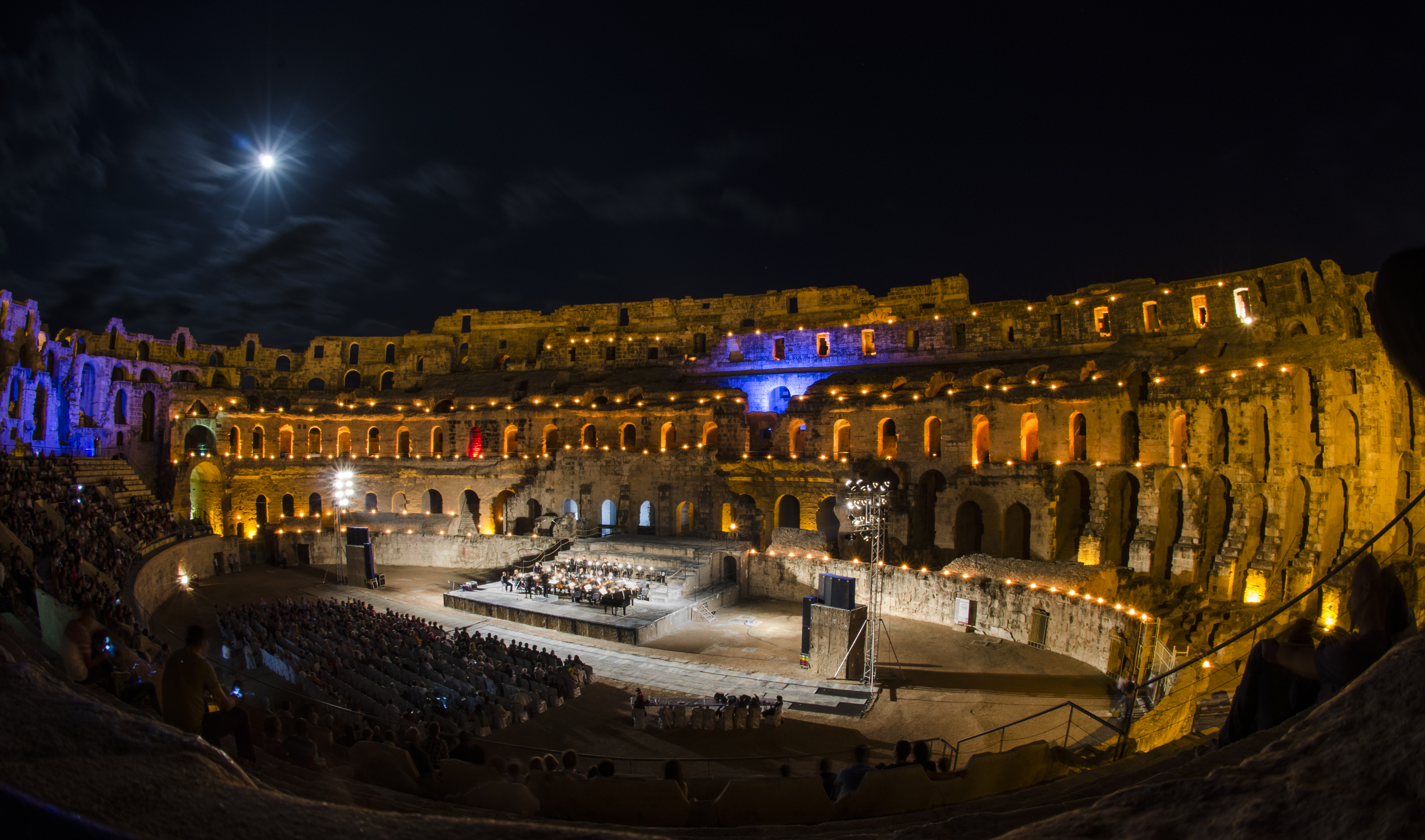
The festival in 2013

The Festival international de musique symphonique d'El Jem (Arabic: المهرجان الدولي للموسيقى السمفونية بالجم) is a symphonic music festival held every summer in the Tunisian town of El Jem since 1985. It is held in the El Jem amphitheater, built in the third century, with a capacity between 27,000 and 30,000 spectators. Since its inception, the festival has attracted many orchestras who come to give performances, including the Algerian National Symphony Orchestra, the Rome Philharmonic Orchestra, the Tunisian Symphony Orchestra, the Budapest Gypsy Symphony Orchestra for the first time in Africa and the Orchestra Sinfonica di Roma led by Francesco La Vecchia.

== See also ==
- List of classical music festivals
- List of festivals in Tunisia
