= Mikołajów, Lower Silesian Voivodeship =

Mikołajów
- Village
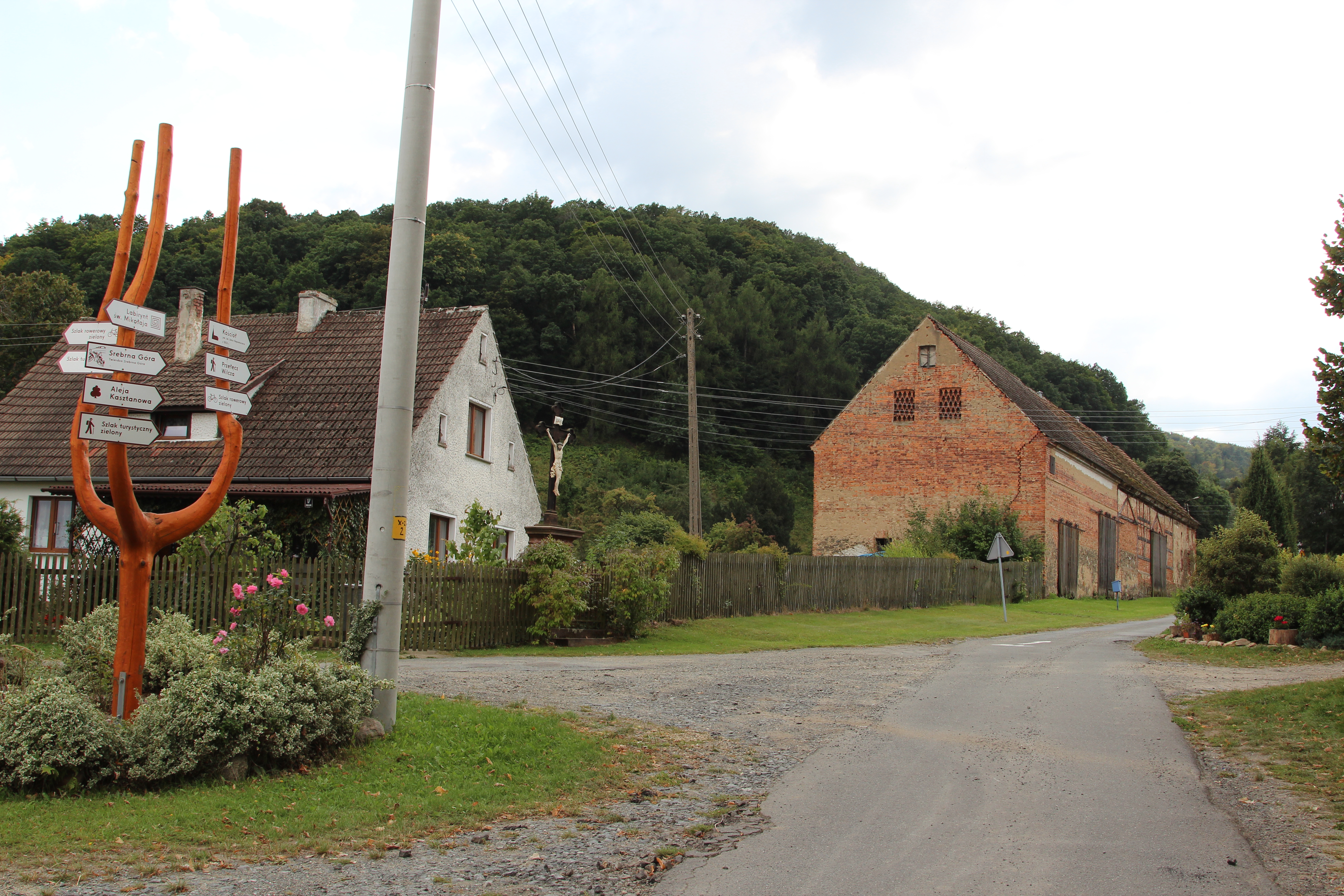

- Location within Poland
- Coordinates: 50°33′07″N 16°41′14″E
- Country: Poland
- Voivodeship: Lower Silesian
- County: Ząbkowice
- Gmina: Stoszowice

Mikołajów [mikɔˈwajuf] is a village in the administrative district of Gmina Stoszowice, within Ząbkowice County, Lower Silesian Voivodeship, in south-western Poland.
