= Rudnica, Lower Silesian Voivodeship =

Rudnica
- Village
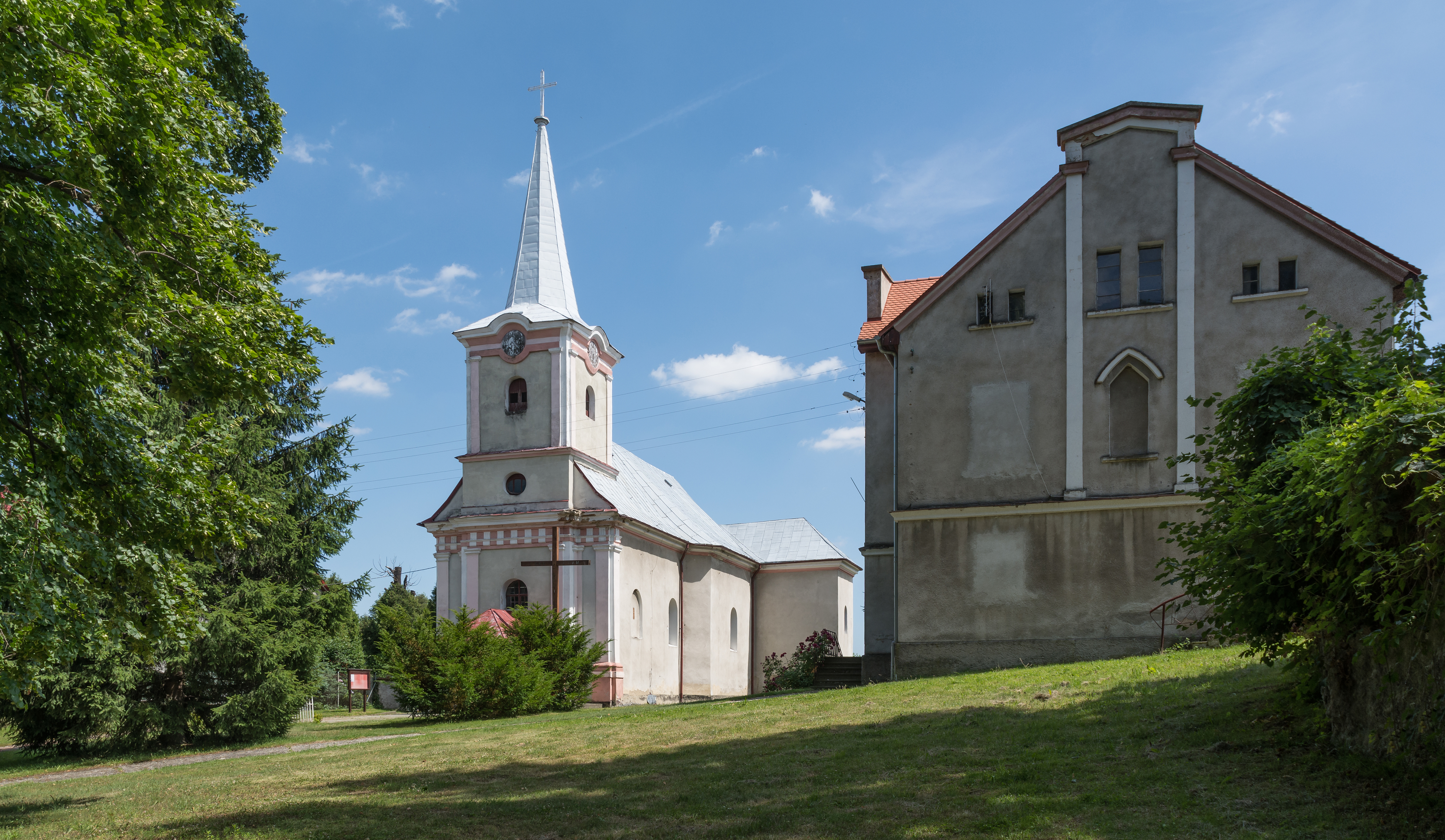

- Location within Poland
- Coordinates: 50°37′N 16°40′E
- Country: Poland
- Voivodeship: Lower Silesian
- County: Ząbkowice
- Gmina: Stoszowice

Rudnica [rudˈnit͡sa] is a village in the administrative district of Gmina Stoszowice, within Ząbkowice County, Lower Silesian Voivodeship, in south-western Poland.
