= Left for Dead (2007 Western film) =

2007 film

- US DVD Cover
- Directed by: Albert Pyun
- Written by: Chad Leslie
- Produced by: Michael Najjar; Cynthia Curnan
- Starring: Victoria Maurette
- Cinematography: Alejandro Millán
- Edited by: Ken Morrisey
- Music by: Anthony Riparetti
- Production companies: Sophia Productions; Findling Films
- Distributed by: Lions Gate Films
- Release date: September 3, 2007 (Semana Internacional de Cine Fantastico Estepona)
- Running time: 84 minutes
- Countries: United States; Argentina
- Language: English

Left for Dead is a 2007 American-Argentine horror Western film directed by Albert Pyun and starring Victoria Maurette.

== Plot synopsis ==
In Mexico in 1895, Clementine Templeton is obsessively tracking the wanted man known as Sentenza for deserting her and their infant child. In her travels, she happens upon a gang of former prostitutes led by Mary Black, whose young daughter was also impregnated and abandoned by Sentenza.

They eventually locate their prey and corner him in a remote ghost town called Amnesty. Which is haunted by the vengeful ghost of slain preacher Mobius Lockhardt, who has made a pact with the devil to remain as an earthbound spirit unable to travel beyond the borders of the town's cemetery and slaughtering any who trespasses.

But there are many secrets surrounding the group and the town of Amnesty, and not everyone's motives are what they appear to be on the surface. As bloody betrayals and misdeeds come back to haunt them, they must confront their pasts if they hope to escape Amnesty and the vengeful wrath of Mobius Lockhardt alive.

== Cast ==
- Victoria Maurette as Clementine Templeton
- María Alche as Dora
- Soledad Arocena as Cota
- Andres Bagg as Mobius Lockhardt
- Janet Barr as Mary Black
- Javier De la Vega as Blake
- Adnen Helali as Garrett Flaherty
- Oliver Kolker as Frankie Flaherty
- Brad Krupsaw as Conner Flaherty
- Mariana Seligmann as Michelle Black

== Production ==
The film was shot in 12 days, entirely in Argentina.

== Awards ==
- 2007 – Best Director (Albert Pyun) – Estepona XIII. Costa del Sol Fantasy Film Festival
- 2007 – Best Actress (Victoria Maurette) – Buenos Aires Rojo Sangre Film Festival
