= Grodziszcze, Ząbkowice County =

Grodziszcze
- Village
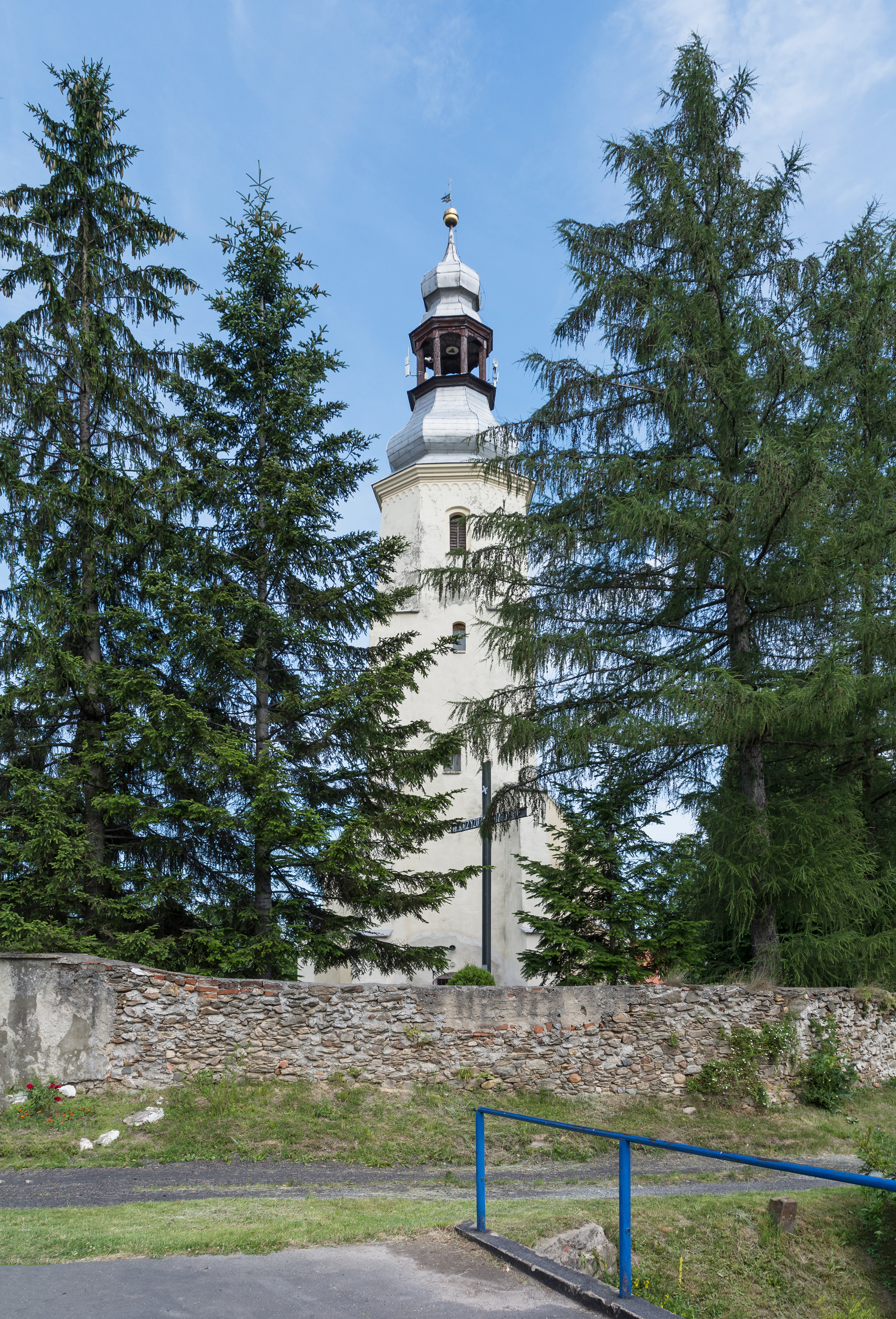
- Maximilian Kolbe church in Grodziszcze

- Location within Poland
- Coordinates: 50°37′32″N 16°39′16″E
- Country: Poland
- Voivodeship: Lower Silesian
- County: Ząbkowice
- Gmina: Stoszowice
- Time zone: UTC+1 (CET)
  - Summer (DST): UTC+2 (CEST)
- Vehicle registration: DZA

Grodziszcze [ɡrɔˈd͡ʑiʂt͡ʂɛ] is a village in the administrative district of Gmina Stoszowice, within Ząbkowice County, Lower Silesian Voivodeship, in south-western Poland.
