= Moritz von Strachwitz =

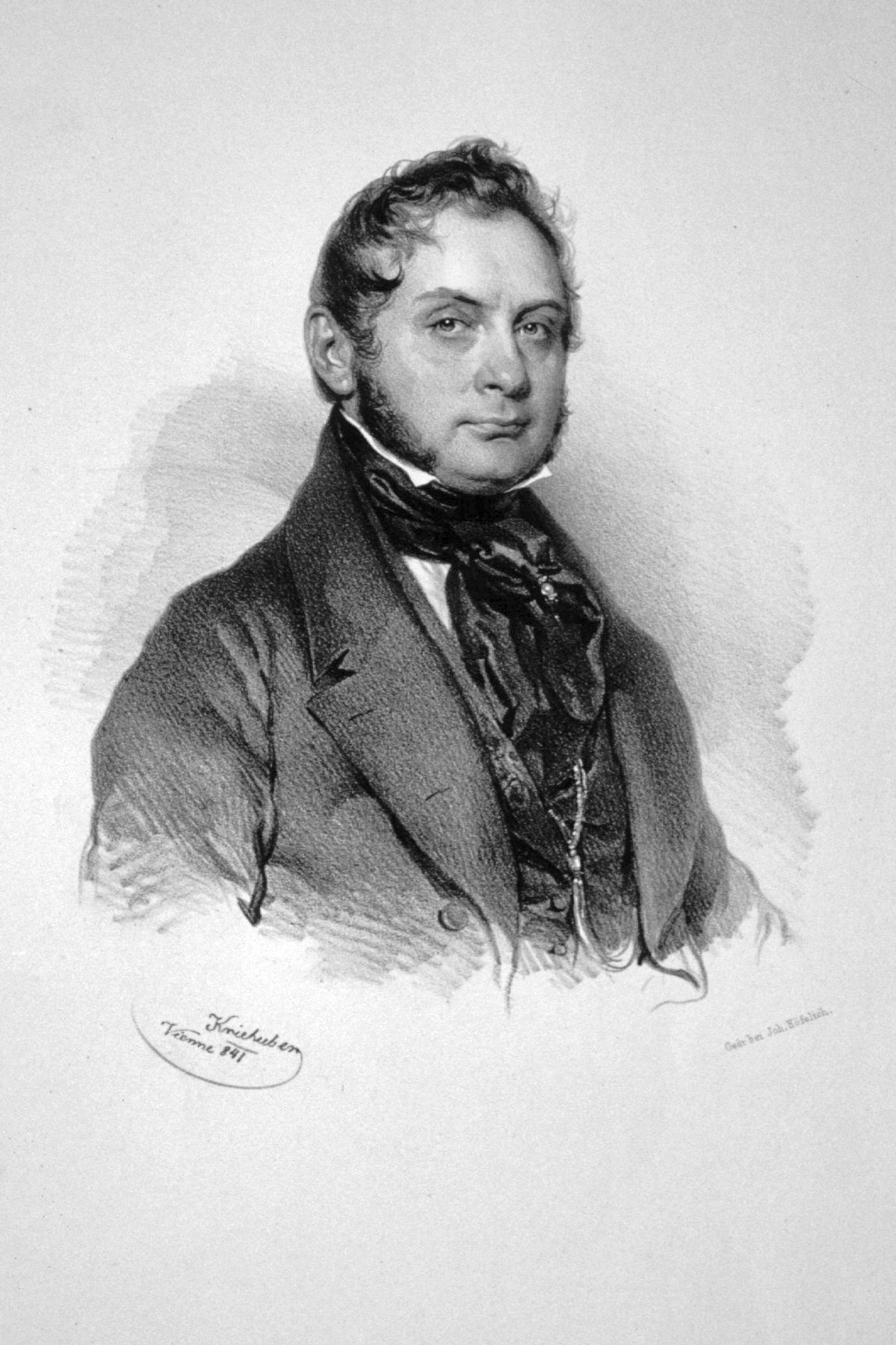
Moritz von Strachwitz

Moritz Karl Wilhelm Anton Graf von Strachwitz (13 March 1822 – 11 December 1847) was a German lyric poet.

Strachwitz was born in Peterwitz, Silesia (today Stoszowice Poland). After studying in Breslau and Berlin he settled on his estate in Moravia, where he devoted himself to literary pursuits. When travelling in Italy in 1847 he was taken ill in Venice, and died in Vienna. Although he had thus only reached his twenty-fifth year, he revealed a lyric genius of remarkable force and originality.

His first collection of poems, Lieder eines Erwachenden (Songs of an Awakening) appeared in 1842 and went through several editions. Neue Gedichte (New Poems) were published after his death in 1848. These poems are characteristic of the transition through which the German lyric was passing between 1840 and 1848; the old Romantic strain is still dominant, especially in his ballads, which are unquestionably his finest productions; but, side by side with it, there is to be seen the influence of Platen, to whose warmest admirers Strachwitz belonged, as well as echoes of the restless political spirit of those eventful years. His political lyric was, however, tempered by an aristocratic restraint which was absent from the writings of men like Herwegh and Freiligrath. Strachwitz's early death in Vienna was a great loss to German letters; for he was by far the most promising of the younger lyric poets of his time.
