= Gmina Stoszowice =

Gmina Stoszowice Stoszowice Commune
- Gmina
- Interactive map of Gmina Stoszowice
- Coordinates (Stoszowice): 50°36′N 16°44′E
- Country: Poland
- Voivodeship: Lower Silesian
- County: Ząbkowice
- Seat: Stoszowice
- Sołectwos: Budzów, Grodziszcze, Jemna, Lutomierz, Mikołajów, Przedborowa, Różana, Rudnica, Srebrna Góra, Stoszowice, Żdanów

Area
  - Total: 109.82 km^{2} (42.40 sq mi)

Population (2019-06-30)
  - Total: 5,383
  - Density: 49.02/km^{2} (127.0/sq mi)
- Website: http://www.stoszowice.pl

Gmina Stoszowice is a rural gmina (administrative district) in Ząbkowice County, Lower Silesian Voivodeship, in south-western Poland. Its seat is the village of Stoszowice, which lies approximately 7 kilometres (4 mi) west of Ząbkowice Śląskie, and 63 kilometres (39 mi) south of the regional capital Wrocław.

The gmina covers an area of 109.82 square kilometres (42.4 sq mi), and as of 2019 its total population is 5,383.

== Neighbouring gminas ==
Gmina Stoszowice is bordered by the town of Piława Górna and the gminas of Bardo, Dzierżoniów, Kłodzko, Nowa Ruda and Ząbkowice Śląskie.

== Villages ==
The gmina contains the villages of Budzów, Budzów-Kolonia, Grodziszcze, Grodziszcze-Kolonia, Jemna, Lutomierz, Lutomierz-Kolonia, Mikołajów, Przedborowa, Różana, Rudnica, Srebrna Góra, Stoszowice, Stoszowice-Kolonia and Żdanów.
