= Adnen Helali =

Tunisian poet and actor (born 1975)

- عدنان الهلالي
- Born: March 23, 1975 (age 51); Sbeitla, Tunisia
- Occupations: Poet and actor

Adnen Helali (Arabic: عدنان الهلالي Adnen al-helali) (born in Sbeitla, 23 March 1975) is a Tunisian poet and actor, born in 1975 in Sbeitla, Tunisia. He is a teacher of French language in Sbeitla, and a member of the theatre group Founoun located in his city.

Adnen is the founder and director of the Sbeitla's Spring International Festival, since 2000. and Rosemary festival of Wassaia, a small village witch belongs to Sbeitla.

== Filmography ==
In 2007, Adnen appeared as Garrett Flaherty in Left for Dead; an American horror western film starring Victoria Maurette and directed by Albert Pyun.

== Work ==
- Fartatou
- Zalabani
