= Stoszowice-Kolonia =

- Village
- Location within Poland
- Coordinates: 50°36′25″N 16°45′51″E
- Country: Poland
- Voivodeship: Lower Silesian
- County: Ząbkowice
- Gmina: Stoszowice

Stoszowice-Kolonia [stɔʂɔˈvit͡sɛ kɔˈlɔɲa] is a village in the administrative district of Gmina Stoszowice, within Ząbkowice County, Lower Silesian Voivodeship, in south-western Poland.
