= Mrazig =

The Mrazig are a previously nomadic people who live in and around the town of Ghlissia and Douz, Tunisia. Their land goes 100 kiliometers/62 miles into the Tunisian desert. They are the descendants of the Banu Sulaym tribe who left the Arabian Peninsula in the seventh century. They lived first in Egypt, then Libya, and finally arrived and settled in Tunisia in the thirteenth century.
