= Budzów, Lower Silesian Voivodeship =

Budzów
- Village
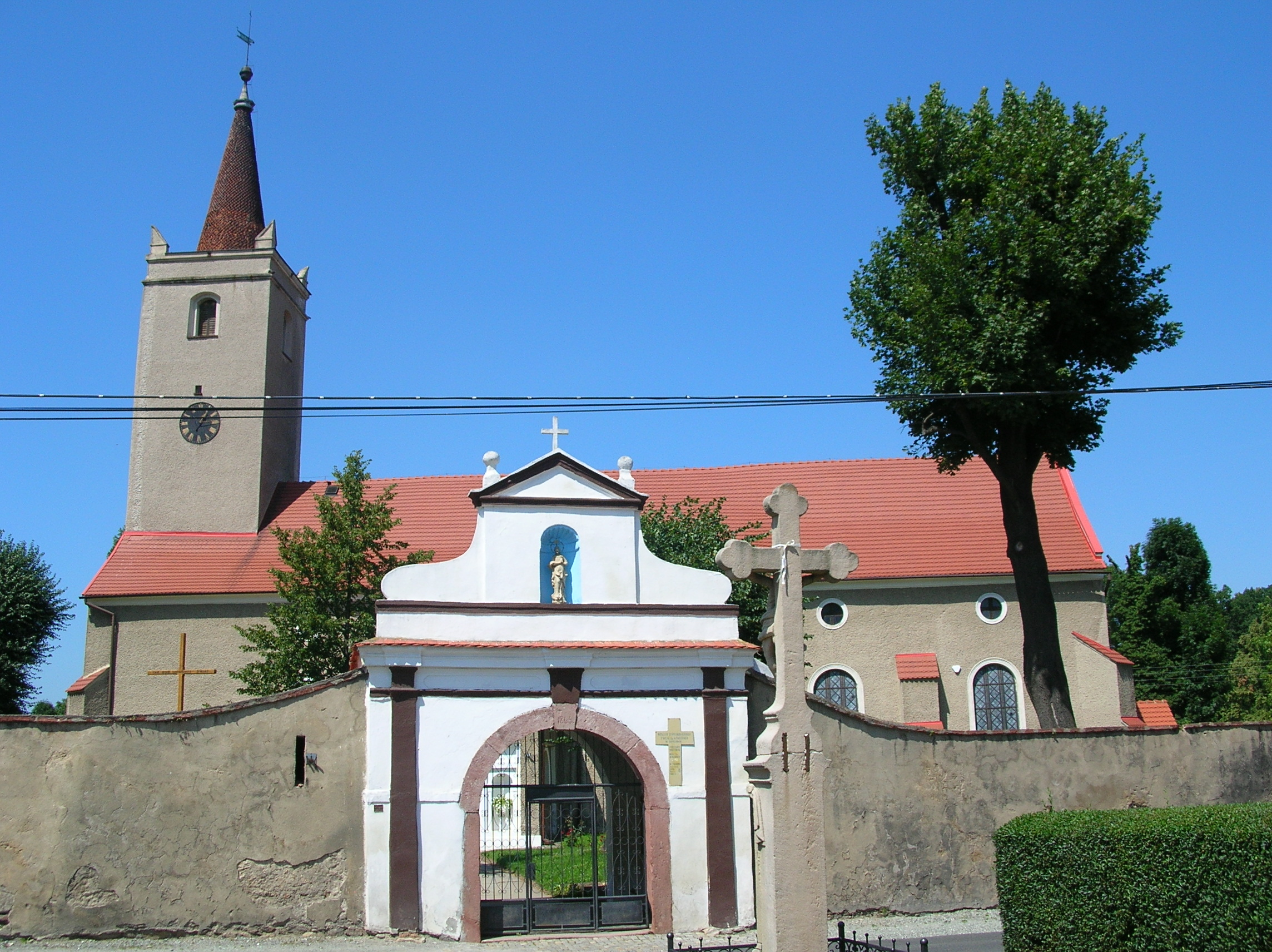
- Church of Saint Lawrence

- Location within Poland
- Coordinates: 50°35′08″N 16°41′58″E
- Country: Poland
- Voivodeship: Lower Silesian
- County: Ząbkowice
- Gmina: Stoszowice

Population
  - Total: 1,100

Budzów ([ˈbud͡zuf]) is a village in the administrative district of Gmina Stoszowice, within Ząbkowice County, Lower Silesian Voivodeship, in south-western Poland.
