= Stoszowice =

- Village
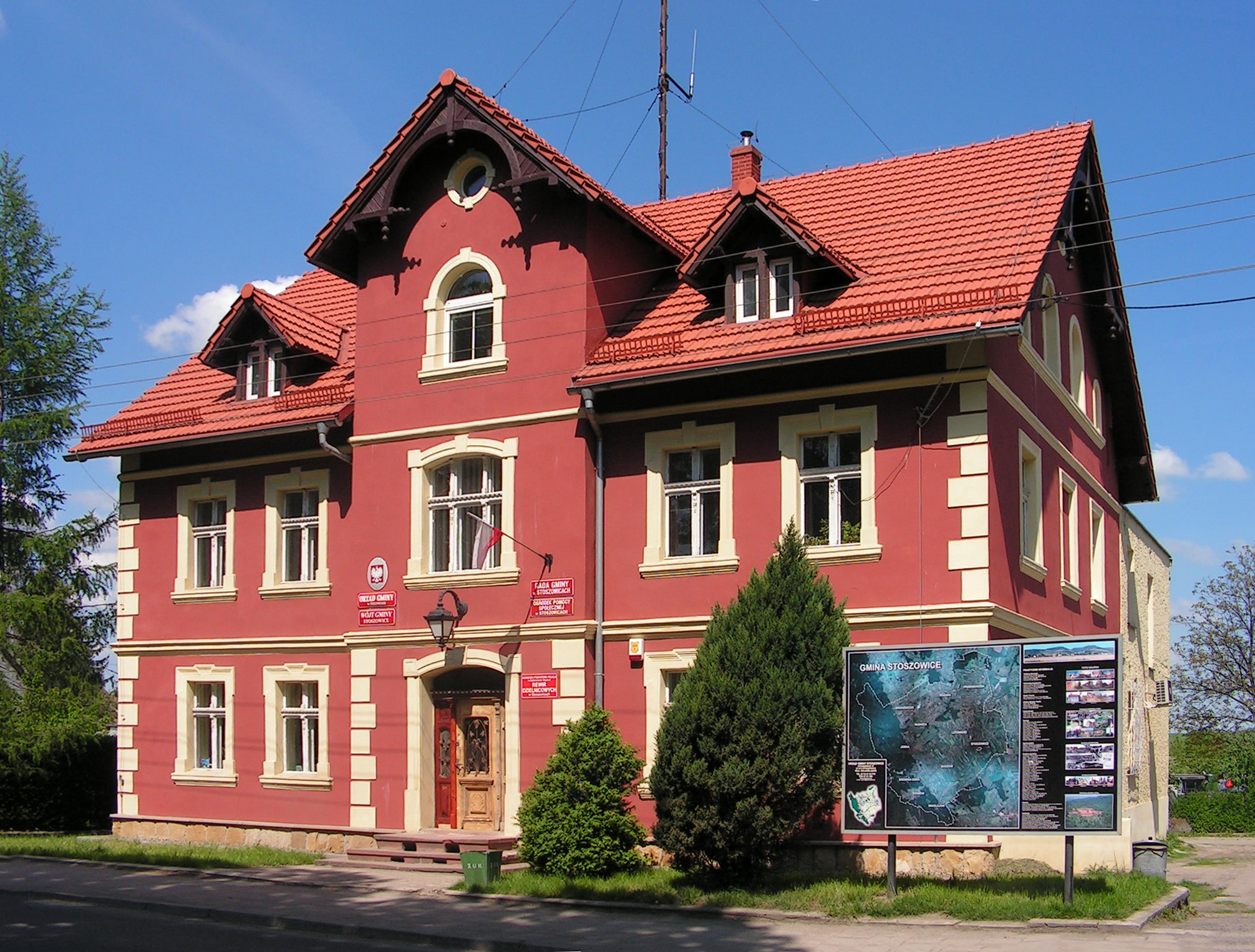
- Municipal office

- Location within Poland
- Coordinates: 50°36′N 16°44′E
- Country: Poland
- Voivodeship: Lower Silesian
- County: Ząbkowice
- Gmina: Stoszowice

Population
  - Total: 1,100

Stoszowice [stɔʂɔˈvit͡sɛ] is a village in Ząbkowice County, Lower Silesian Voivodeship, in south-western Poland. It is the seat of the administrative district (gmina) called Gmina Stoszowice.

== Notable residents ==
- Moritz von Strachwitz (1822–1847) German poet
