= Lutomierz =

- Village
- Location within Poland
- Coordinates: 50°36′N 16°43′E
- Country: Poland
- Voivodeship: Lower Silesian
- County: Ząbkowice
- Gmina: Stoszowice

Lutomierz [luˈtɔmjɛʂ] is a village in the administrative district of Gmina Stoszowice, within Ząbkowice County, Lower Silesian Voivodeship, in south-western Poland.
