= Przedborowa =

- Village
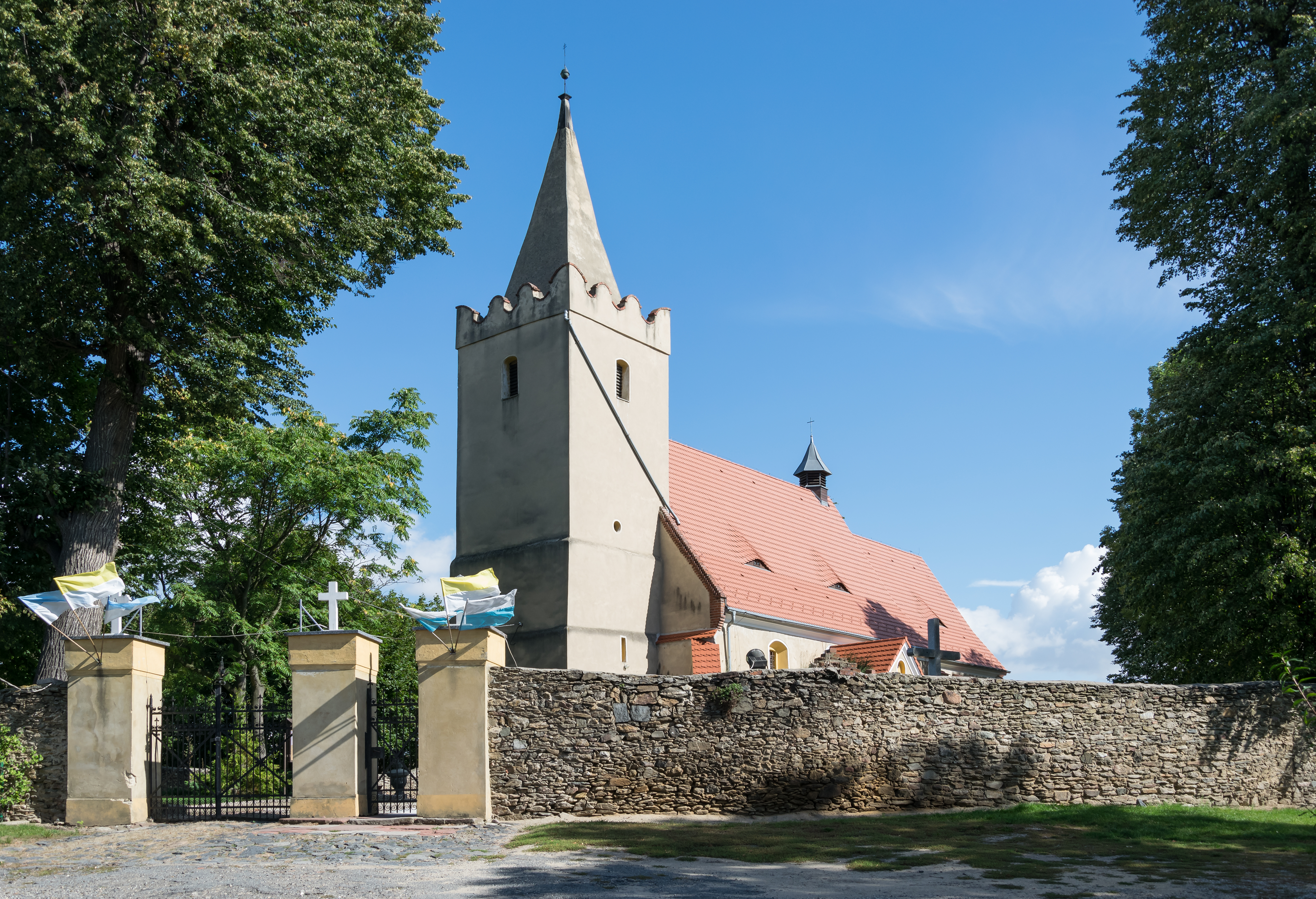
- Church of Saint Hedwig

- Location within Poland
- Coordinates: 50°38′N 16°44′E
- Country: Poland
- Voivodeship: Lower Silesian
- County: Ząbkowice
- Gmina: Stoszowice
- Time zone: UTC+1 (CET)
  - Summer (DST): UTC+2 (CEST)
- Vehicle registration: DZA

Przedborowa [pʂɛdbɔˈrɔva] is a village in the administrative district of Gmina Stoszowice, within Ząbkowice County, Lower Silesian Voivodeship, in south-western Poland.

== Notable people ==
- Jan Jankiewicz, Polish cyclist
