= Lutomierz-Kolonia =

- Village
- Location within Poland
- Coordinates: 50°37′11″N 16°42′55″E
- Country: Poland
- Voivodeship: Lower Silesian
- County: Ząbkowice
- Gmina: Stoszowice

Lutomierz-Kolonia [luˈtɔmjɛʂ kɔˈlɔɲa] is a village in the administrative district of Gmina Stoszowice, within Ząbkowice County, Lower Silesian Voivodeship, in south-western Poland.
