= Mahres =

Mahres المحرس Mahares, El Mahres
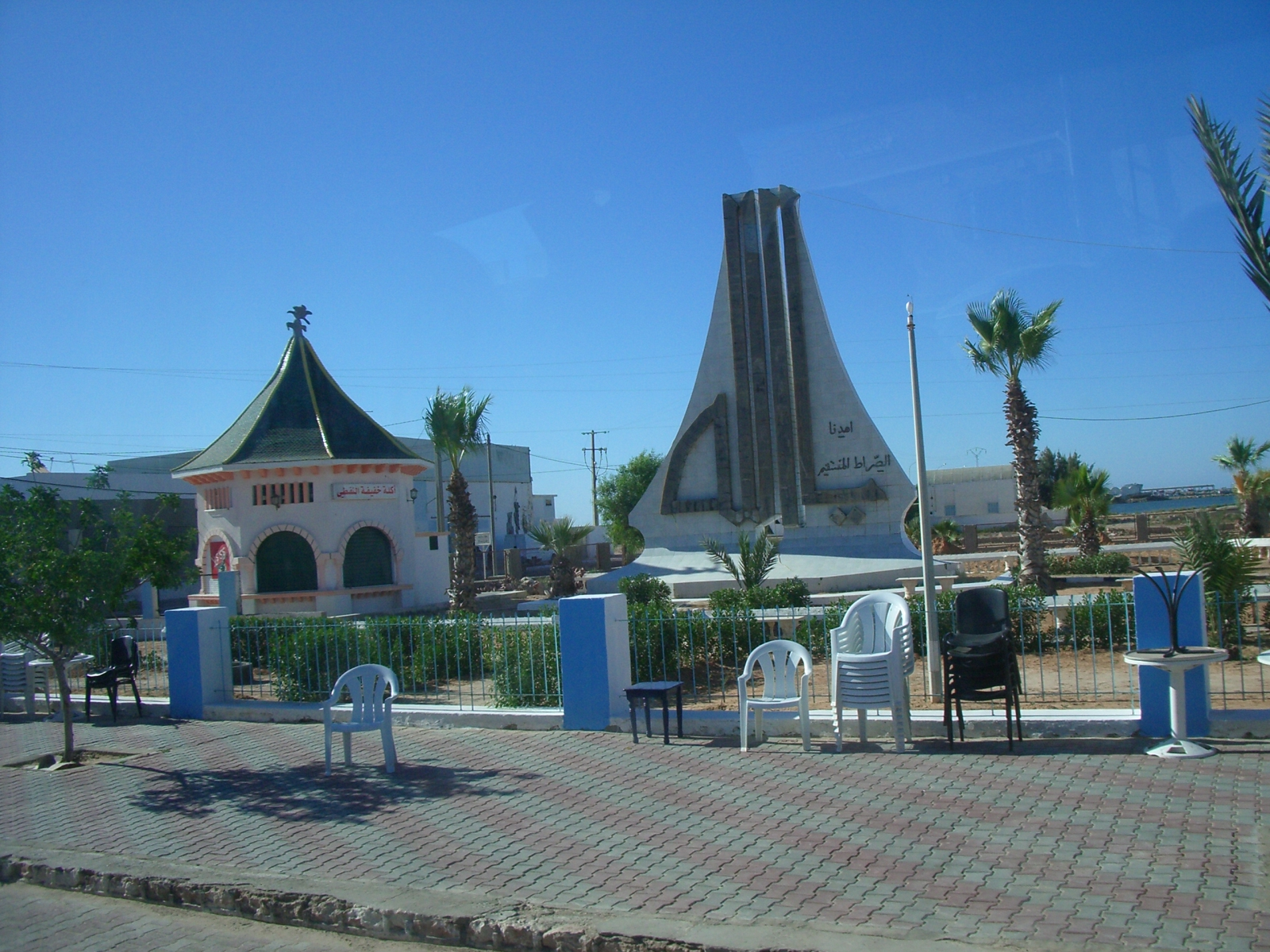

- Location within Tunisia
- Coordinates: 34°32′N 10°30′E
- Country: Tunisia
- Governorate: Sfax Governorate

Area
  - Total: 13 km^{2} (5.0 sq mi)

Population (2014)
  - Total: 15,878
- Time zone: UTC+1 (CET)

Mahres (Tunisian Arabic: "place for guard"), also known as Mahares or El Mahres, is a coastal town in Tunisia about thirty kilometers south of Sfax and 300 kilometers from Tunis. It had 15,878 inhabitants in 2014.

Administratively attached to the governorate of Sfax, it became on April 1, 1918 a municipality and, after independence in 1956, the capital of a delegation whose area is estimated at 436 km.

== History ==
In 412, Bishop Valentinianus, representative of the Catholic town of Younga (Macomades Minores ), located south of present-day Mahres, attended the Council of Carthage. In addition, the city hosted a provincial council in 524.

The Byzantine fortress of Younga is the only archaeological site of its kind in the region. Its construction dates back to the 6th century. Mahrès was a coastal trading post in the Phoenician period. It played an important role in the conversion of the Berbers to Christianity during the Roman and Byzantine periods. It then experienced a brilliant Arab-Muslim period during the reign of the Aghlabids which made it a powerful bulwark against foreign invasions, in particular to prevent a possible attack from Kairouan. In the middle of the 9th century, it was the Aghlabid cadi of Sfax, Ali ibn Salem Al-Bekri appointed to his post by Imam Sahnoun, who built a new fortress in the northern part of Mahres and changed the Roman name of the city to Mahres Ali ( محرس علي ). In turn, this name was later changed to that of Al Mahrès Al Jadid ( المحرس الجديد ) and simplified to Mahrès.

The Aghlabid fortress stood For eleven centuries before being transformed in 1937, at the time of the French protectorate, by the construction of the Great Mosque of Mahres which occupies the interior while using walls of the fortress, modified in their turn, as surrounding walls.

== Economy ==
The economy is based on the cultivation of the olive tree, the extraction of olive oil, fishing, dairy production, the agro-food industry, the furniture industry and the making of clothes. The long beach of Chaffar is the only tourist area in the governorate of Sfax, located three kilometers from the city.

The LPG plant linked to the Miskar field, which is nine kilometers north of the city, is operated by the British Gas and provides 50% of Tunisia's natural gas needs.
