= Kebili =

Kebili ڨبلي
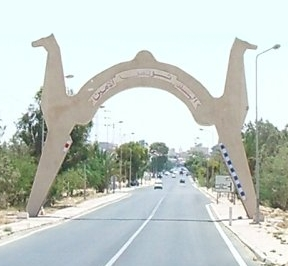
- Entrance of the Kebili town

- Location within Tunisia
- Coordinates: 33°42′18″N 08°57′54″E
- Country: Tunisia
- Governorate: Kebili Governorate
- Delegation(s): Kebili North, Kebili South

Government
  - Mayor: Ahmed Yacoub (Ennahda)

Population (2014)
  - Total: 28,081
- Time zone: UTC+1 (CET)
  - Summer (DST): UTC+2 (CEST)

Kebili (Arabic: ڨبلي, romanized: Gibillī, pronounced [ˈɡbɪlli]) is a town in the south of Tunisia and one of the main cities in the Nefzaoua region. It is located in southern Tunisia near the Chott el Djerid salt lake. It is the capital of the Kebili Governorate.

== History ==
Kebili is one of the oldest oases in Tunisia and North Africa. It holds the earliest hard evidence of human habitation in Tunisia (found near the town) and dates back about 200,000 years. Kebili, along with many other Tunisian cities, became part of the Roman Empire after the Punic Wars.

== Demographics ==
Kebili's population is more diverse compared to other Tunisian governorates. The population traces its roots to three main groups:

- Berbers: The native inhabitants of Tunisia and North Africa.
- Arabs: They came to Kebili in the early days of the Muslim conquest. Most came from the Southern Arabian Peninsula (modern day Saudi Arabia and Yemen). They still hold the tribal names of their ancestors.
- Black Africans: They were brought to the city when it was a slavery trade center. See the Economy section below.

== Language and religion ==
While Arabic is the dominant language in the region, several differences set it apart from the Tunisian Arabic spoken elsewhere in the country. Most notably, the letter qāf ق is pronounced as a [g] rather than the guttural [q]. Additionally, some villages use the feminine plural pronouns antunna أنتن (plural you) and hunna هن (they). These pronouns are very rare throughout the Arab world and are usually replaced by their masculine counterparts antum أنتم and hum هم. Bedouin vocabulary and expressions have declined in usage among the new generations.

Islam is the dominant religion. Kebili, as many other Tunisian towns, holds a great number of Soofiat Maqams (Saleheen).

== Economy ==
The economy of Kebili has seen diverse orientations throughout its history. Kebili was one source of the African slavery trade to satisfy European needs. Slaves were taken to Europe through the port of Gabès. Nowadays, Kebili relies heavily on agriculture and tourism.

=== Agriculture ===
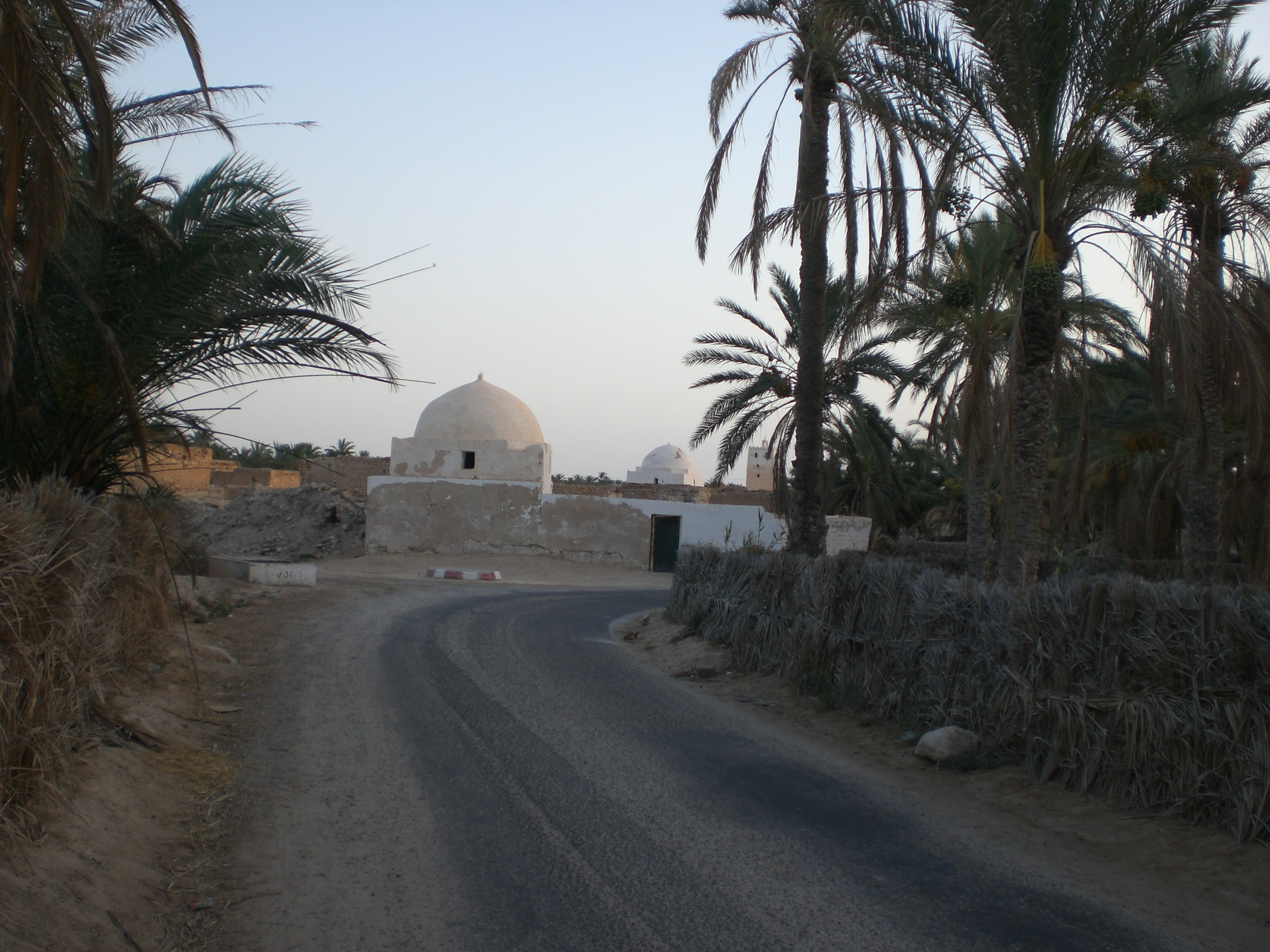
Kebili village.

The main agricultural product in the region are dates or "deglets". Kebili produces a very high quality date, exported all around the world and contributing significantly to the local and national economy.

=== Tourism ===
Since national independence, the government of Tunisia has encouraged tourism projects and resorts in the Saharan region. Of these Douz, south of Kebili, is the most famous Saharian destination of Tunisia (known as the Sahara Gate).

== Climate ==
Temperature records have been kept here from 1901–1939, 1949–1953, and 2000–2012. The French colonial authorities of the Service météorologique de Tunis maintained the older records. A portion of the original data logs for this early period is in the NCDC archives and at the POR of 1907 to 1932. Like Azizia, Kebili is subject to the foehn-like wind phenomena known as a Ghibili.

The World Meteorological Organization cites Kebili as having recorded the highest temperature ever recorded in Africa at 55.0 °C (131.0 °F), which is disputed by some meteorologists mainly because in the post WW2-era no temperature above 48.8 °C (119.8 °F) (24 July 1997) was recorded in the Kebili station and no temperature above 51.3 °C (124.3 °F) (Ouargla, Algeria, 5 July 2018) was recorded in the whole continent of Africa.

Climate data for Kebili (1981–2010, extremes 1988–2022)
| Month | Jan | Feb | Mar | Apr | May | Jun | Jul | Aug | Sep | Oct | Nov | Dec | Year |
|---|---|---|---|---|---|---|---|---|---|---|---|---|---|
| Record high °C (°F) | 26.5 (79.7) | 34.3 (93.7) | 38.2 (100.8) | 40.1 (104.2) | 45.5 (113.9) | 48.1 (118.6) | 48.8 (119.8) | 48.5 (119.3) | 45.8 (114.4) | 41.2 (106.2) | 35.7 (96.3) | 28.9 (84.0) | 48.8 (119.8) |
| Mean daily maximum °C (°F) | 17.1 (62.8) | 19.5 (67.1) | 23.3 (73.9) | 26.9 (80.4) | 31.8 (89.2) | 36.3 (97.3) | 39.2 (102.6) | 39.2 (102.6) | 34.9 (94.8) | 30.0 (86.0) | 23.0 (73.4) | 17.9 (64.2) | 28.3 (82.9) |
| Daily mean °C (°F) | 10.5 (50.9) | 12.5 (54.5) | 16.3 (61.3) | 19.9 (67.8) | 24.5 (76.1) | 28.6 (83.5) | 31.2 (88.2) | 31.5 (88.7) | 28.0 (82.4) | 23.2 (73.8) | 16.2 (61.2) | 11.3 (52.3) | 21.1 (70.1) |
| Mean daily minimum °C (°F) | 4.6 (40.3) | 5.9 (42.6) | 9.8 (49.6) | 13.4 (56.1) | 17.7 (63.9) | 21.6 (70.9) | 23.9 (75.0) | 24.7 (76.5) | 22.0 (71.6) | 17.2 (63.0) | 10.0 (50.0) | 5.3 (41.5) | 14.7 (58.4) |
| Record low °C (°F) | −3.3 (26.1) | −4.5 (23.9) | −0.9 (30.4) | 2.8 (37.0) | 6.1 (43.0) | 13.7 (56.7) | 16.6 (61.9) | 16.2 (61.2) | 10.6 (51.1) | 5.3 (41.5) | −1.6 (29.1) | −4.5 (23.9) | −4.5 (23.9) |
| Average precipitation mm (inches) | 22.9 (0.90) | 4.6 (0.18) | 12.9 (0.51) | 10.9 (0.43) | 6.6 (0.26) | 1.1 (0.04) | 0.1 (0.00) | 1.9 (0.07) | 8.1 (0.32) | 8.8 (0.35) | 10.1 (0.40) | 13.3 (0.52) | 101.3 (3.98) |
| Average precipitation days (≥ 1.0 mm) | 3.4 | 1.7 | 2.1 | 1.2 | 0.9 | 0.2 | 0.0 | 0.4 | 1.7 | 1.2 | 1.5 | 2.0 | 16.3 |
| Average relative humidity (%) | 68 | 61 | 56 | 52 | 53 | 48 | 47 | 50 | 51 | 55 | 62 | 68 | 56 |
| Mean monthly sunshine hours | 212.9 | 226.4 | 244.5 | 251.0 | 277.0 | 307.5 | 323.7 | 306.2 | 249.0 | 236.1 | 217.3 | 203.6 | 3,055.2 |
Source: Institut National de la Météorologie (precipitation days/humidity 1961–1990) (Note: The Station ID for Kebili is 66464111.)

== Gallery ==
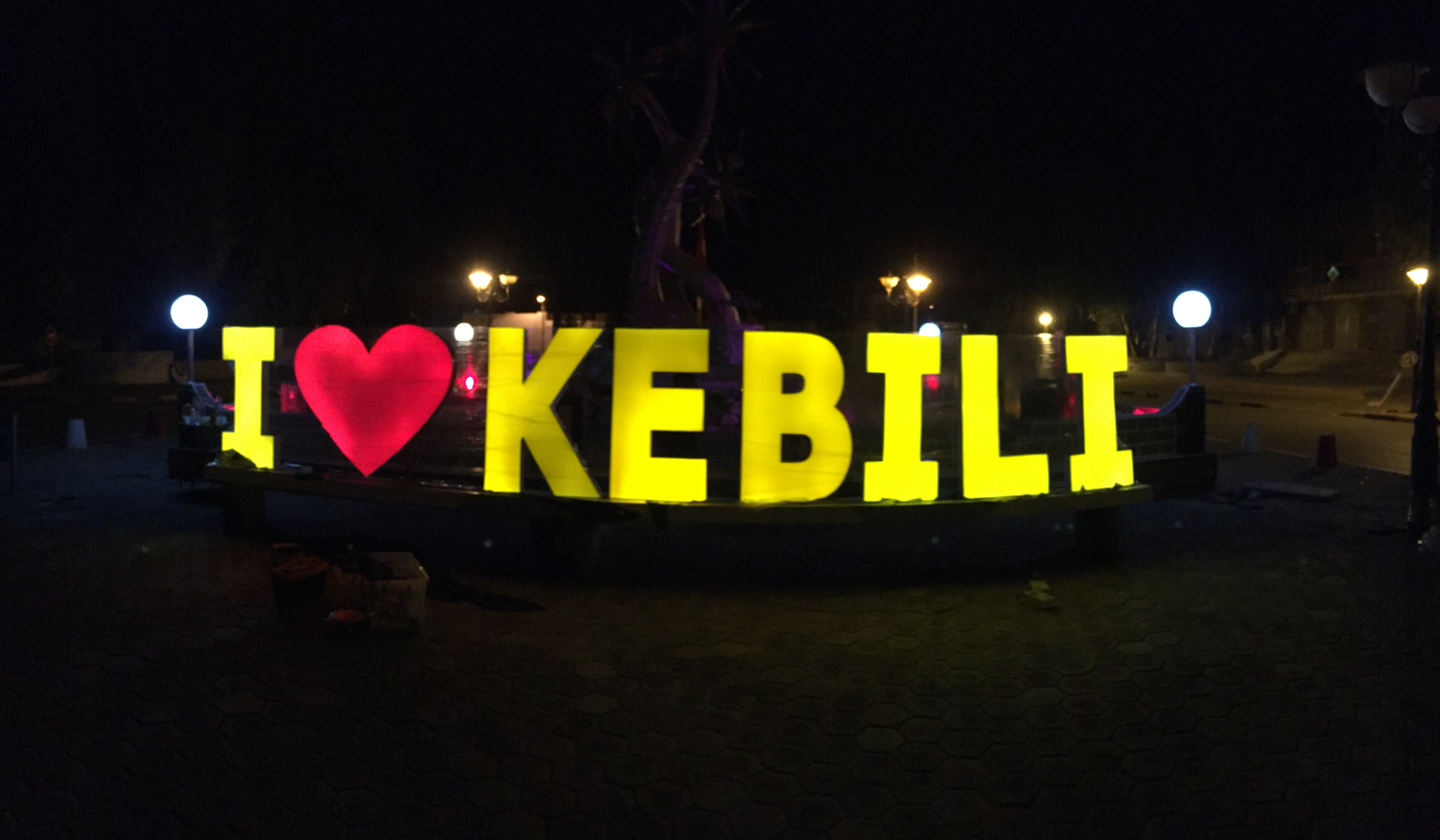

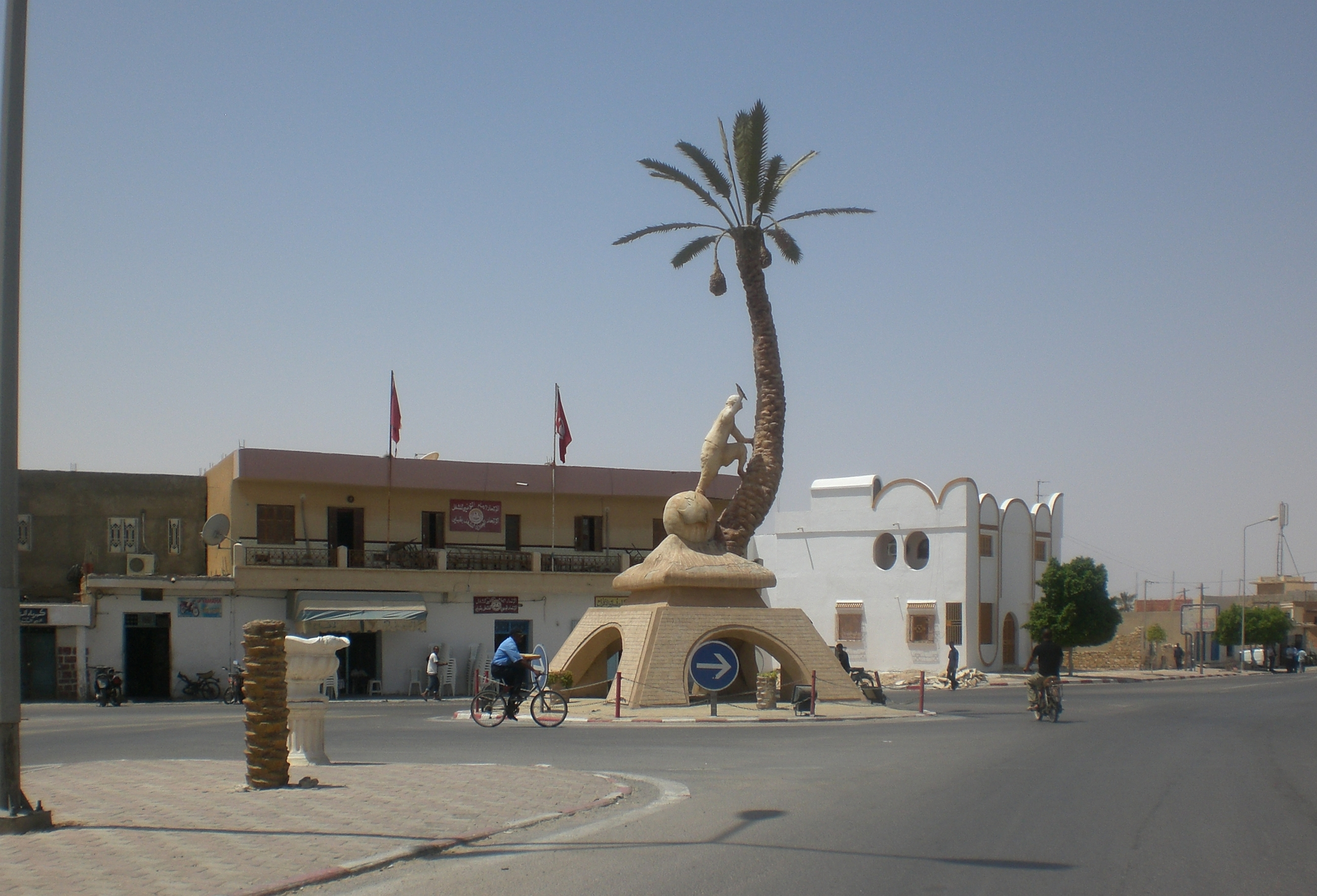

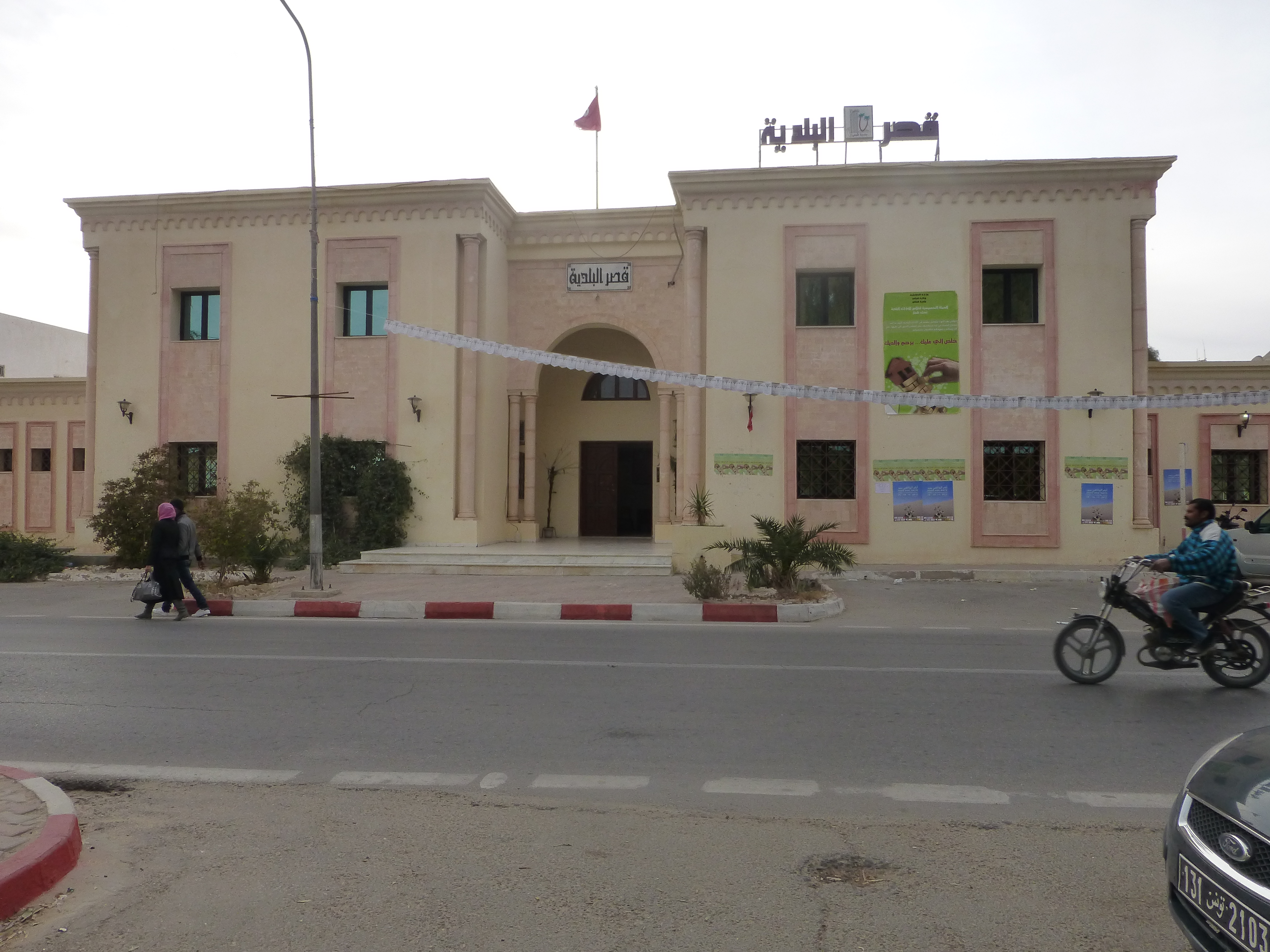

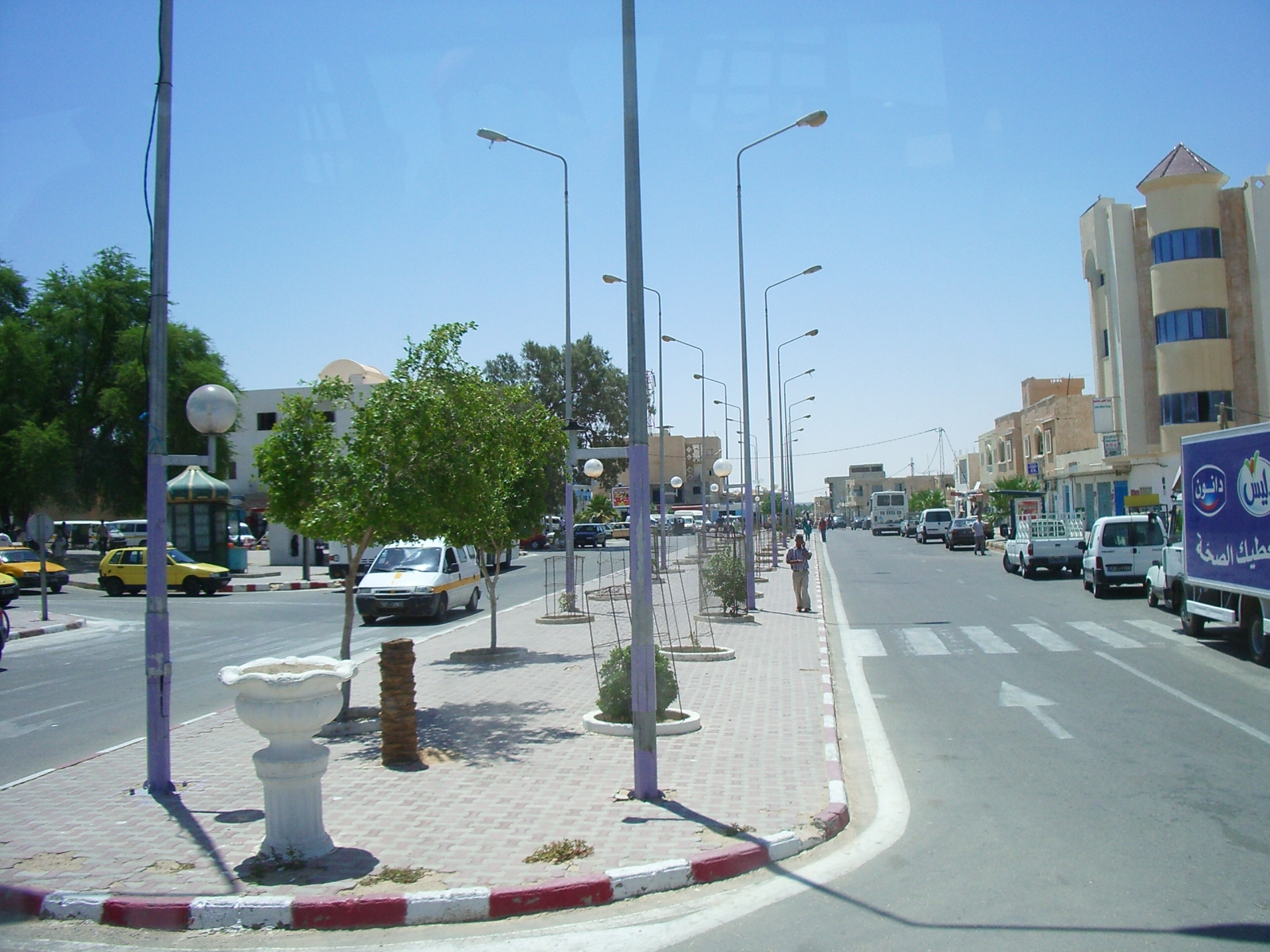

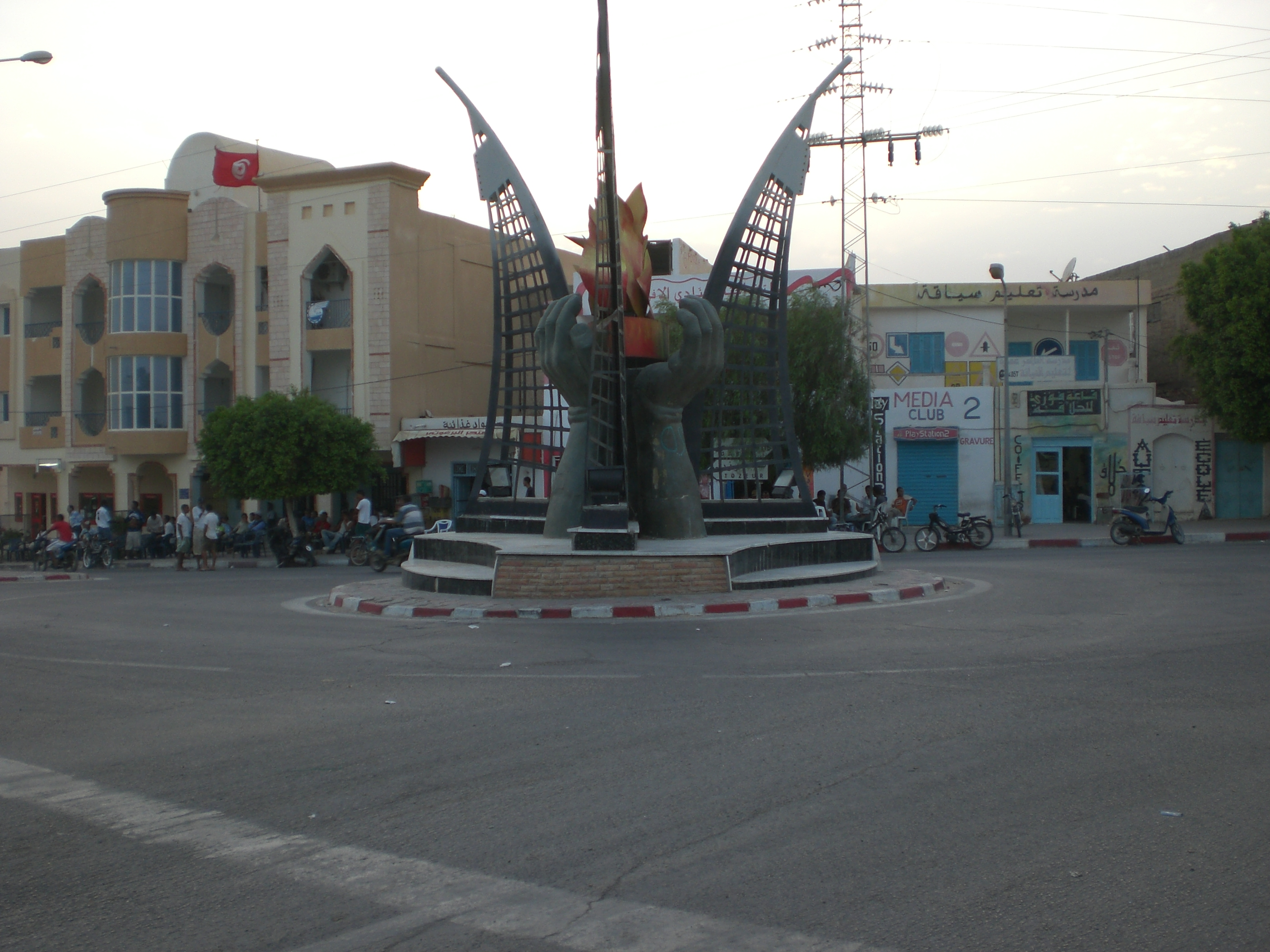

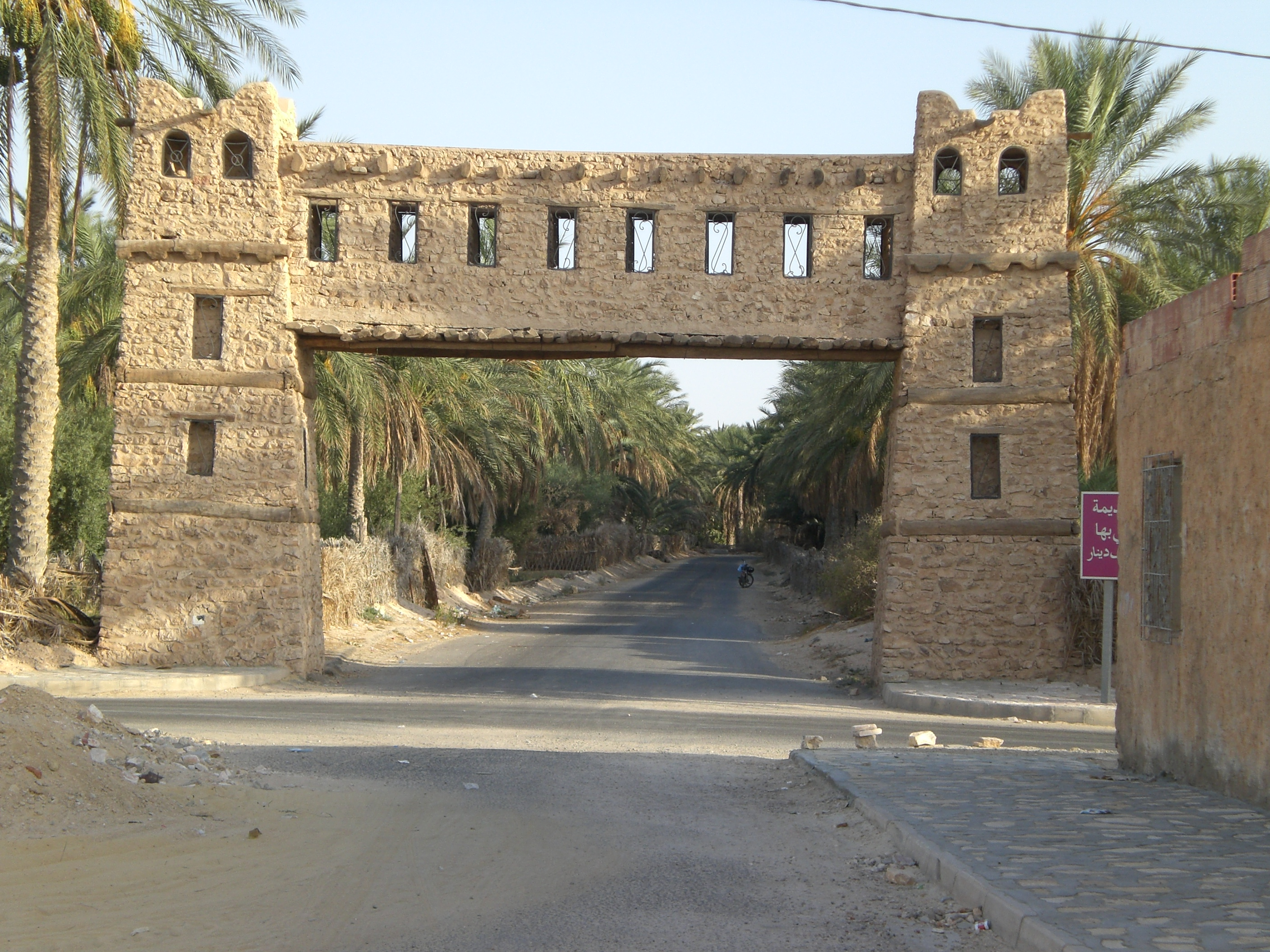

== Notable people ==
- Hend Sabry (born 1979), Tunisian actress, lawyer and ambassador to the World Food Programme
