= Djemna =

- Location in Tunisia
- Coordinates: 33°35′N 9°01′E
- Country: Tunisia
- Governorate: Kebili Governorate
- Delegation(s): Kebili South

Government
  - Mayor: Nizar Najah (Democratic Current)

Population (2004)
  - Total: 6,128
- Time zone: UTC1 (CET)

Djemna (Arabic: جمنة Ğamna), also spelt Jemna, is a small town located in southern Tunisia. The town is part of the Kebili Governorate.

It is surrounded by the Tunisian Sahara. The city is known for its springs.

Djemna is one of the biggest producers of dates or deglets in Tunisia.

Djemna contains one of the oldest libraries in Tunisia (located in the old mosque). Djemna also contains the south scientific center of the City of Sciences.

Only a little minority still live in the town. The majority live outside Tunisia (mainly France and Germany).
