= International Festival of the Sahara =

Annual festival held in Douz, Tunisia

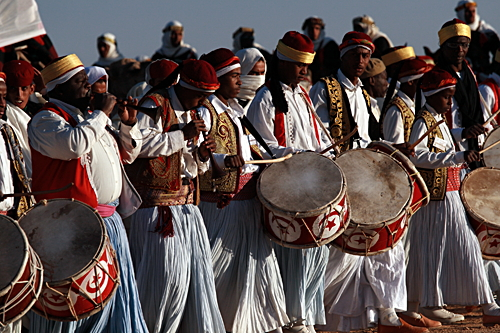
- Tunisian musicians shot at the 43rd International Festival of the Sahara in Douz, Tunisia
- Frequency: Annually
- Locations: Douz, Tunisia
- Founded: 1910
- Area: International
- Website: www.festivaldouz.org.tn

The International Festival of the Sahara is an annual festival held in Douz, Tunisia.

== History ==
The festival, called the Camel festival, began in 1910 when Tunisia was under French rule. In 1967 it took on its modern identity according to the will of Habib Bourguiba, Tunisia's first president of the new republic, to become the country's oldest and best-known festival. M'hammed Marzougui, who dedicated his life to make people aware of and appreciate nomadic way of life and traditions, was mainly responsible for the festival's foundation. Since then, every year at the end of December for four days, thousands of people, mostly from all over Tunisia and other Maghrebien countries, flock to Douz.

== The festival ==
After the opening ceremony, the main events take place in the H'naiech stadium in front of the desert surrounded by Bedouin tents. Camel marathons, fantasia- galloping Arab horses ridden by daring riders, a Bedouin marriage, sloughi desert hunting dogs - catching rabbits are the principal features.

In the evening, groups from visiting countries perform songs and dances. The central event is the poetry contest run by the desert poet, Abdellatif Belgacem.

The festival has become an important media and touristic event followed by cameramen and journalists from all over the world.

== See also ==
- List of festivals in Tunisia
