= Żdanów, Lower Silesian Voivodeship =

Żdanów
- Village
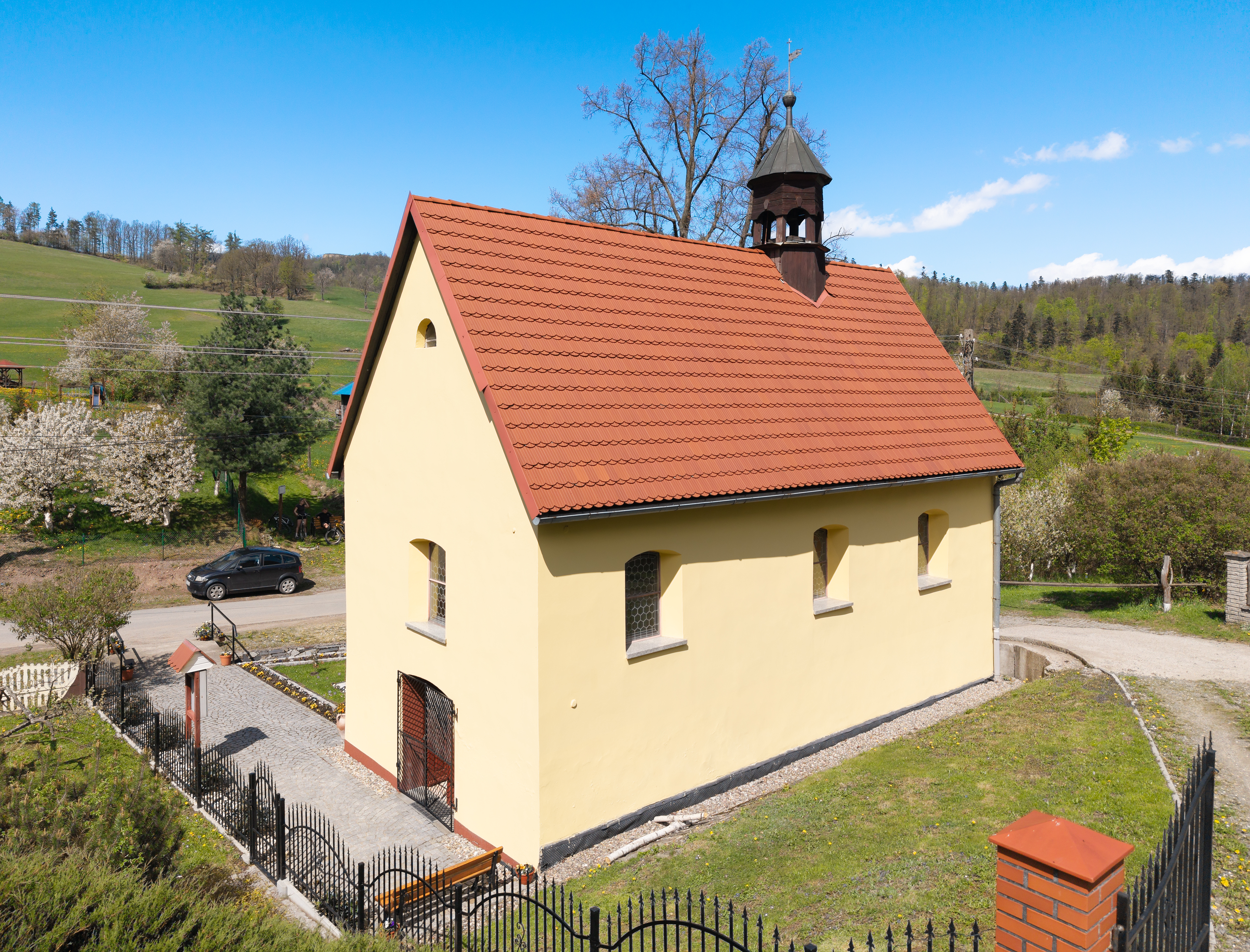

- Location within Poland
- Coordinates: 50°33′30″N 16°39′08″E
- Country: Poland
- Voivodeship: Lower Silesian
- County: Ząbkowice
- Gmina: Stoszowice
- Population: 144

Żdanów [ˈʐdanuf] is a village in the administrative district of Gmina Stoszowice, within Ząbkowice County, Lower Silesian Voivodeship, in south-western Poland.
