= Nefzaoua =

Nefzaoua (Tunisian Arabic: نفزاوة) is a region of southwest Tunisia bounded by the salt lake Chott el Djerid to the west, the Grand Erg Oriental to the south, and the Dahar plateau to the east.

Administratively, the territory is in the Kebili Governorate and covers 2.208 million hectares, including 15,300 hectares of oasis. Historically the region had a population of Christian Berbers; this was supplemented by Mozarabs who left Spain due to the Reconquista.

== Agriculture ==
The town is known for producing deglet nour date.
