= Kebili Governorate =

Governorate of Tunisia

Kebili ڨبلي
- Governorate
- Coat of arms

- Map of Tunisia with Kebili highlighted

- Subdivisions of Kelibi Governorate
- Coordinates: 33°42′7″N 8°58′25″E
- Country: Tunisia
- Created: September 1981
- Capital: Kebili

Government
  - Governor: Moez Laabidi (since 2024)

Area
  - Total: 22,454 km^{2} (8,670 sq mi)
  - Rank: Ranked 2nd of 24

Population (2014)
  - Total: 156,961
  - Rank: Ranked 22nd of 24
  - Density: 6.9903/km^{2} (18.105/sq mi)
- Demonym(s): Kebilian (Arabic: قبلاوي, Kebelawi)
- Time zone: UTC+01 (CET)
- Postal prefix: 42xx
- Calling code: 75-4
- ISO 3166 code: TN-73

Kebili Governorate (Arabic: ولاية ڨبلي, romanized: Wilāyat Gibillī, pronounced [ˈɡbɪlli]; French: Gouvernorat de Kébili) is the second largest of the 24 governorates (provinces) of Tunisia. It is situated in south-western Tunisia, bordering Algeria. It covers an area of 22,454 square kilometres (8,670 sq mi) and had a population of 156,961 at the 2014 census. The capital is Kebili. Its economic activities are mainly focused on agriculture, the oases producing the famous deglet nour dates, and tourism with the Sahara and its dunes located near Douz.

== Geography ==
Kebili climate is very difficult in winter (very cold at night) and in summer (high temperature). The region is very nice to visit in spring and in the end of autumn.

Kebili contains a significant part of Tunisia's largest salt pan, which is known as Chott el-Jerid, as well as the western end of Chott el Fejej.

== Administrative divisions ==
Kebili Governorate is subdivided into six delegations:

- Douz North
- Douz South
- Faouar
- Kebili North
- Kebili South
- Souk El Ahed

The following five municipalities are located in Kebili Governorate:

6311	Kebili	50,016
6312	Djemna	7,815
6313	Douz	46,135
6314	El Golâa	9,095
6315	Souk Lahad	21,069
	Bechli - Blidet - Jerssin	14,787
	Bechri - Fatnassa	9,760
	Faouar	19,875
	Rjim Maatoug	4,649
