= Douz =

- Commune and town
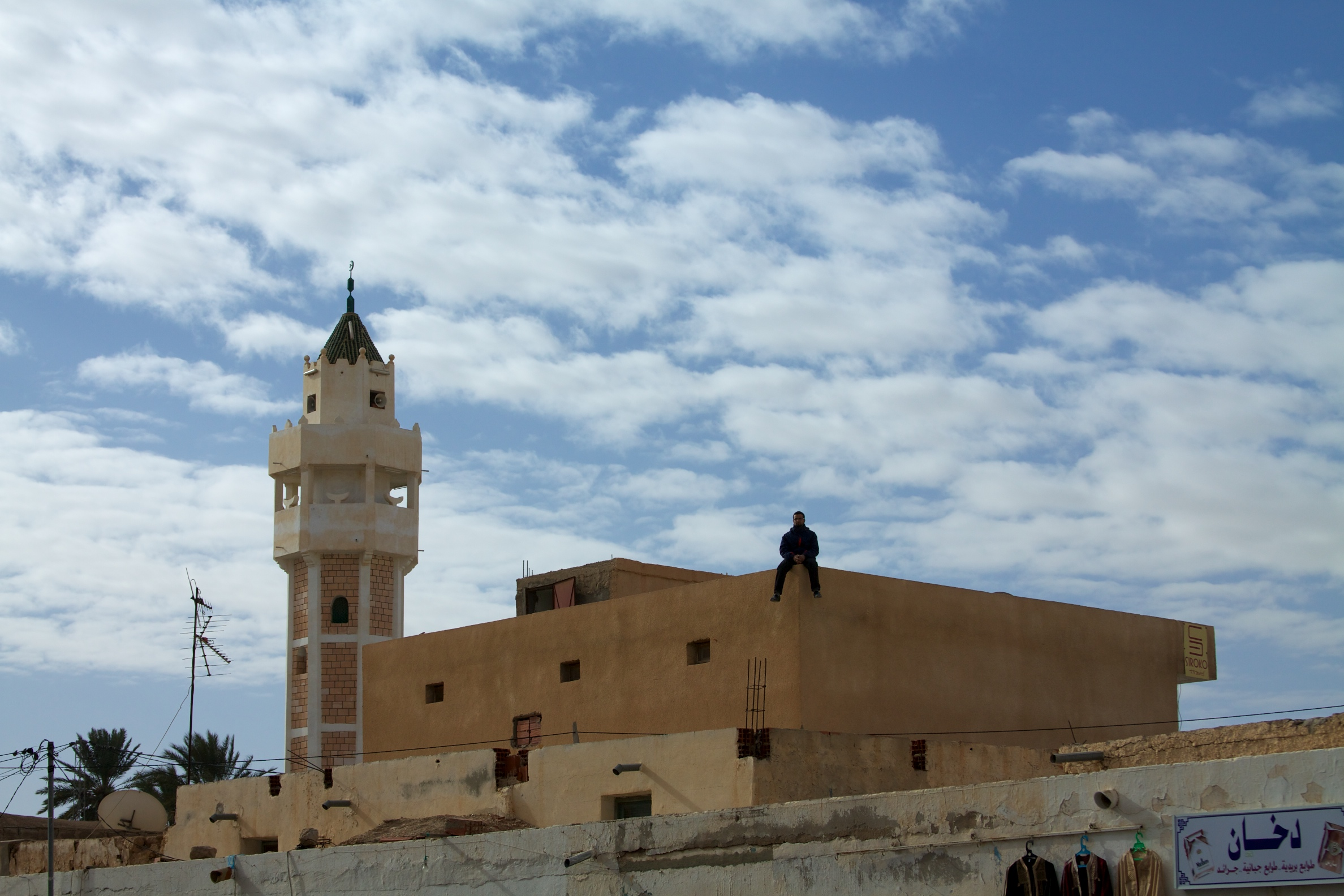
- Douz during the Festival of the Sahara, 2010

- Location in Tunisia
- Coordinates: 33°27′26″N 9°1′30″E
- Country: Tunisia
- Governorate: Kebili Governorate

Population (2022)
  - Total: 34,221
- Time zone: UTC1 (CET)

Douz (Arabic: دوز dūz) is a town in the Kebili Governorate in the south of Tunisia, known as the "gateway to the Sahara." By road it is located 31 kilometres (19 mi) southwest of Blidet, 125 kilometres (78 mi) southeast of Tozeur, and 475 kilometres (295 mi) south of the Tunisian capital of Tunis.

== History ==
It has been called the "ultimate palm oasis", because it has over 500,000 palm trees in the area, and it is a major producer of "diglat noor" dates. In previous times it was an important stop on the trans-Saharan caravan routes. Today, it is a destination for tourists who are interested in seeing the desert, and a starting point for desert treks by camel, motorcycle, or four-wheel-drive vehicle.

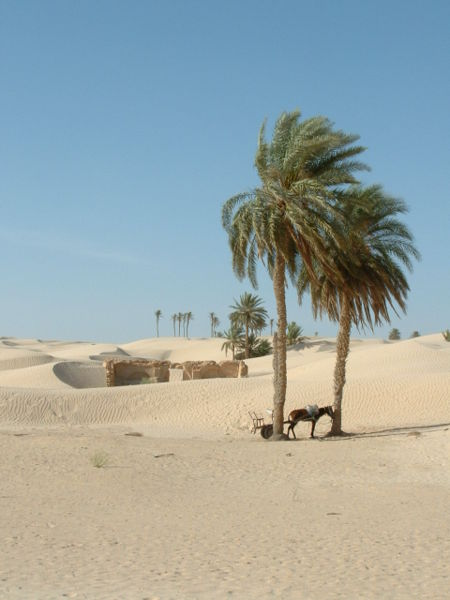
A donkey and its cart at the desert oasis of Douz, 2006

== Culture ==
Every year Douz hosts the International Festival of the Sahara, a four-day celebration of traditional desert culture. The festival, usually held in November or December, features traditional music and dancing, poetry readings, camel wrestling, and racing of horses and salugis. Douz is home to the Museum of the Sahara, which showcases displays on traditional nomadic desert culture of the Mrazig people who now mostly live a settled life in the town.

== Demography ==
The majority of inhabitants of Douz are from Arab descent (Banu Sulaym)

Douz is the home of Mrazig people.

== Gallery ==
A woman in red traditional clothing on the market, Douz 1997

Douz street view with motorcyclist, 1997

Three dromedaries, Douz, 1997

Date palmes with dates in plastic for protection, Douz 1997

Dromedaries at a market, Douz, 1997
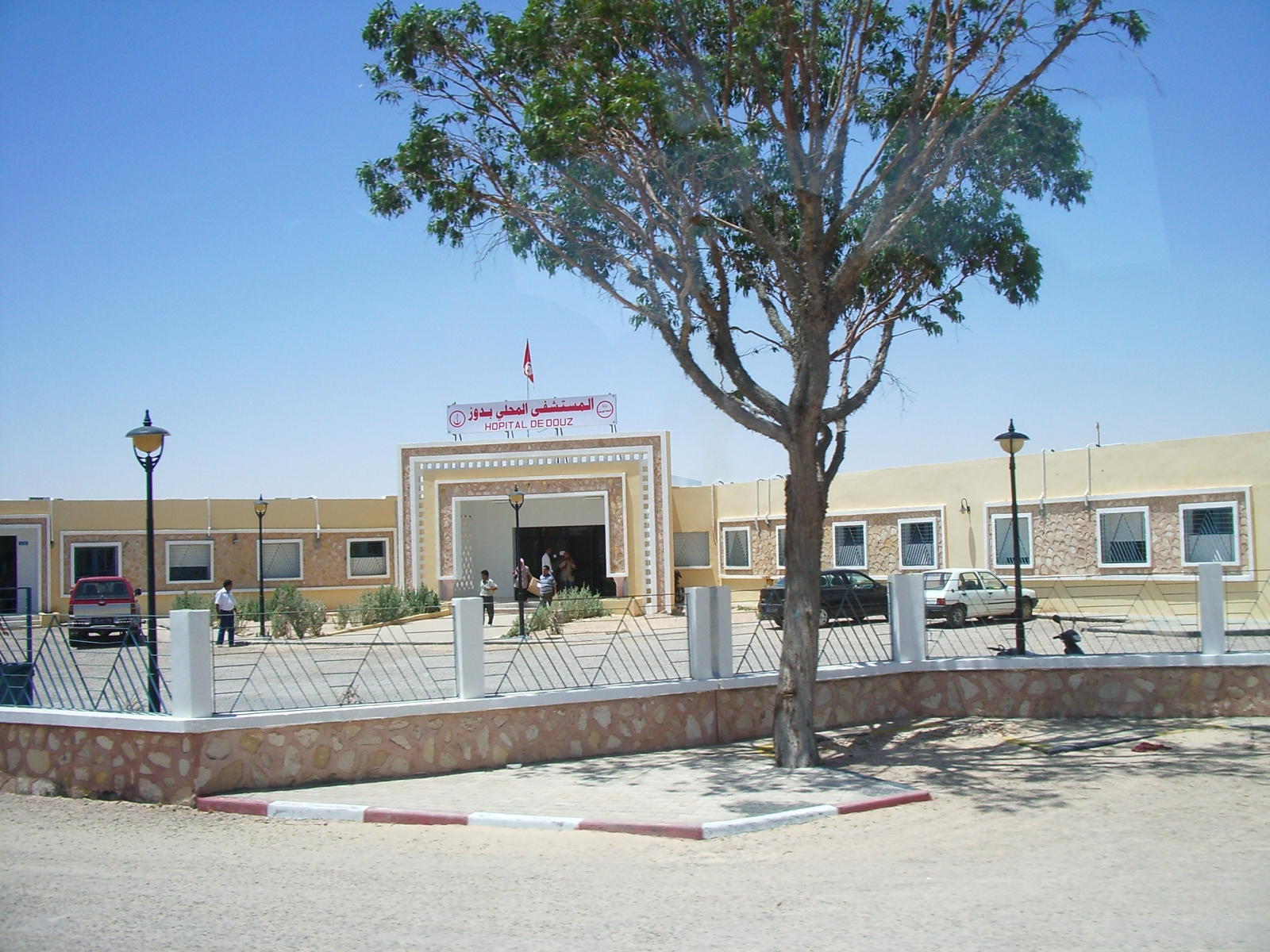
"Hôpital de Douz", Douz Hospital, 2007

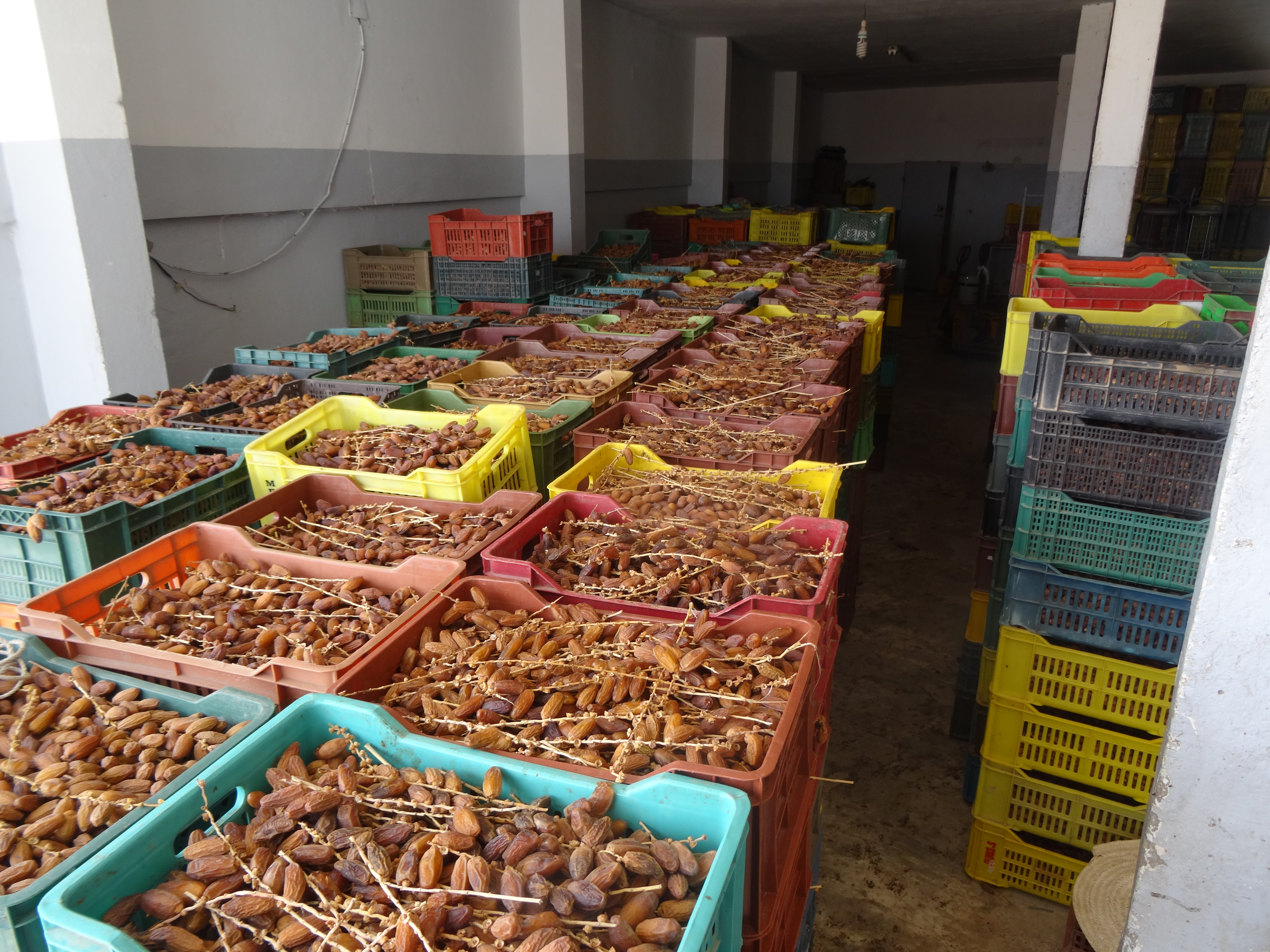
Harvested dates waiting for further processing, 2016

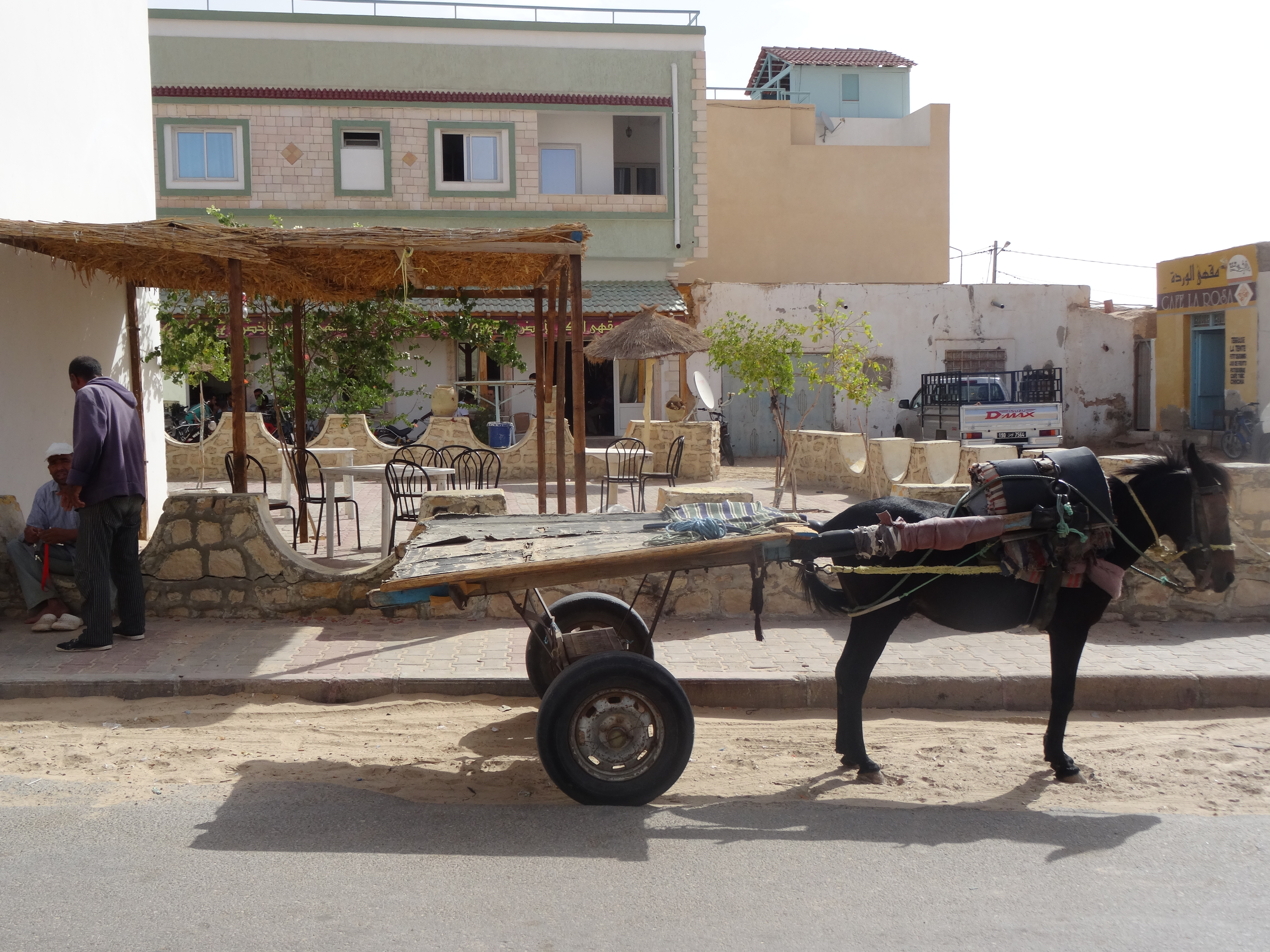
Donkey cart, 2016

== See also ==
- List of cities in Tunisia
