= List of date cultivars =

A large number of date cultivars and varieties emerged through history of its cultivation, but the exact number is difficult to assess. Hussain and El-Zeid (1975) have reported 400 varieties, while Nixon (1954) named around 250. Most of those are limited to a particular region, and only a few dozen have attained broader commercial importance. The most renowned cultivars worldwide include Deglet Noor, originally of Algeria; Zahidi and Hallawi of Iraq; Medjool of Morocco; Mazafati of Iran.

Most of the information in the following list is from Date Palm Genetic Resources and Utilization by Al-Khayri et al. (2015).

== List ==
Name	Country	Native name	Notes	Image
Abdel Rahman	Yemen			
Abel	Libya			
Abid Raḥim, Abidraḥim	Sudan	Arabic: عبد رحيم	In Nigeria, it is called Dabino.	
Abyadh (Bathri, seeded)	Yemen			
Ademou	Morocco			
Aghous (Aguis)	Niger			
Aglany	Egypt			
Aguelid	Morocco			
Ahardane	Morocco			
Ahmar Danca	Mauritania			
Ahmar Dli	Mauritania			
Aïssa-Iyoub	Morocco			
Ajwa	Saudi Arabia	Arabic: العجوة		
Akanirom	Niger			
Al Sahagi	Yemen			
Al-Falha	Mauritania			
Alfat Al-Bahoua	Mauritania			
Alfat Foum Agadir	Mauritania			
Al-Hanaouia	Mauritania			
Alig	Tunisia	Arabic: العليقي		
Almadeyna	Niger			
Almehtari	Iran			
Amari, Ameri	Bahrain; Israel	Arabic: عماري		
Amchekhssi	Mauritania			
Amhat	Egypt			
Amir Hajj or Amer Hajj	Iraq		Soft with a thin skin and thick flesh, sometimes called "the visitor's date" because it is a delicacy served to guests.	
Ammari, Ammary, Amry	Tunisia; Egypt	Arabic: عماري		
Anagow	Chad	Arabic: أنقو		
Anbara, Anbarah	Saudi Arabia; Kuwait	Arabic: عنبرة		
Angou	Tunisia	Arabic: أنقو		
Ardousow	Chad			
Aribo	Chad			
Arichti, Arichty, Rochty	Tunisia	Arabic: عرشتي		
Arsandow	Chad			
Asabia el Aroos	Yemen			
Asada	Sudan			
Aṣeel	Pakistan	Urdu: أصيل	Dates from Pakistan that are pitted and diced	
Ashhal	Bahrain			
Ashrasi	Syria	Arabic: اشرسي		
Aswad	Qatar			
Atratinna	Niger			
Awaidi	Kuwait			
Azat	Qatar			
Azigzao	Morocco			
Aziza Bouzid	Morocco			
Azzani	Yemen			
Baghaberha	Niger			
Bagounia	Niger			
Bamour	Libya			
Banat - Alabade	Bahrain			
Banat - Alssyid	Bahrain			
Baqal	Yemen			
Barakawi	Sudan	Arabic: بركاوي		
Barbosa	Yemen			
Barḥi, Barḥee	Bahrain; India; Iran; Iraq; Israel; Kuwait; Palestine; Qatar; Saudi Arabia; Syria; Djibouti; Sudan	Arabic: برحي	Nearly spherical, light amber to dark brown when ripe; soft, with thick flesh and rich flavour. One of the few varieties that are good in the khalal stage when they are yellow (like a fresh grape, as opposed to dry, like a raisin).	
Barni	Oman	Arabic: برني		
Barni Madinah	Saudi Arabia			
Bartamoda, Barttamoda	Egypt; Sudan			
Basbrik	Mauritania			
Bashbak	Qatar			
Bayaḍ	Saudi Arabia	Arabic: بياض		
Baydir	Algeria			
Begum Jangi	Pakistan			
Beiḍ	Saudi Arabia	Arabic: بيض		
Bejjou	Tunisia	Arabic: الباجو		
Beladi	Djibouti			
Belhazit	Morocco			
Bent-Eisha	Egypt			
Bent Qbala	Algeria			
Berni	Libya	Arabic: برني		
Berz	Qatar			
Bestian	Libya			
Biḍ Ḥamam	Tunisia	Arabic: بيض حمام		
Bin Saif	Qatar			
Biraira, Bireir	Sudan	Arabic: برير		
Birbin	Syria	Arabic: بربن		
Bisr Ḥelou	Tunisia	Arabic: بسر حلو		
Bollior	Spain			
Bornow	Chad			
Boucerdoune	Morocco			
Boufaggouss, Boufegous (Moussa)	Tunisia; Morocco			
Bouhattam	Tunisia			
Bouijjou	Morocco			
Bouittob	Morocco			
Boujira	Mauritania			
Boukhanni	Morocco			
Bourar	Morocco			
Bouskri	Morocco			
Bouslikhene	Morocco			
Bousthami	Morocco		Black (kahla) and white varieties	
Boutemda	Morocco			
Bouzeggar	Morocco			
Braim, Breim	Kuwait; Iran			
Brismi	Bahrain			
Bu Narenjah	Oman			
Buchairah	Bahrain			
Buraimi	Saudi Arabia			
Candíos Puntiagudos	Spain			
Candits, Cándidos, Maduros	Spain			
Cheikh Mhammed (Sheikh Mohammed)	Algeria			
Choddakh	Tunisia	Arabic: شداخ		
Confitera	Spain			
Dabbas	United Arab Emirates			
Dagh	Pakistan			
Datça	Turkey			
Dan Haoussa	Niger			
Daurat, Dorado	Spain			
Dayri	Iran; Iraq; Israel	Arabic: ديري	The "Monastery" date, these are long, slender, nearly black, and soft.	
De Adobo	Spain			
De Berberia	Spain			
De Espiga	Spain			
De Rambla	Spain			
De Sol	Spain			
Dedhi	Pakistan			
Degla Beida	Algeria			
Degla Bidha	Tunisia			
Deglet Noor	Algeria; Chile; Peru; Tunisia; United States; Israel; Palestine; Saudi Arabia; Syria	Arabic: دقلة نور		
Dehdar Moradi	Iran			
Dhakki	Pakistan			
Dibinojeh naoura	Cameroon			
Dilo	Niger			
Dogordow	Chad			
Empress	Indio, California		Developed by the DaVall family from a seedling of Thoory. It is large, and is softer and sweeter than Thoory. It generally has a light tan top half and brown bottom half.	
Faqur	Chad			
Farḍ, Faraḍ	Oman; Bahrain; Somalia	Arabic: فرض	Deep dark brown, tender skin, sweet flavor, small seed. Keeps well when well packed.	
Fasli	Pakistan			
Fermla	Tunisia	Arabic: فرملة		
Fezzani	Tunisia	Arabic: فزاني		
Fṭimi or Alligue	Tunisia	Arabic: فطيمي	Grown in inland oases of Tunisia.	
Gabiley	Yemen	Arabic: الجبيلي		
Gajjar	Pakistan			
Gameye or Ngamaya	Niger			
Gargoda	Egypt; Sudan			
Gharrah	Bahrain			
Ghars	Algeria	Arabic: غرس		
Gharss Souf (Gharss Meṭṭig)	Tunisia	Arabic: غرس سوف or غرس مطيقي		
Ghudairey	Yemen			
Ghur	Saudi Arabia	Arabic: الغر		
Gish Rabi	Syria			
Goknah	Pakistan			
Gonda, Gounda, Goundi	Tunisia	Arabic: قندة		
Gondaila	Egypt; Sudan			
Goria Fari	Niger			
Goria Ja	Niger			
Goṣbi, Gouṣbi	Tunisia	Arabic: قصبي		
Gros, Cavirots, Redondos	Spain			
Guewass	Niger			
Gulistan	Pakistan			
Gzaz	Yemen			
H-1 (H1, Heng One)	Indonesia; Thailand	Thai: เอช-1		
Hadib	Niger			
Hafs	Morocco			
Haji Mohammadi	Iran			
Hajri	Yemen			
Ḥalawi, Ḥalawy	India; Iran; Iraq; Israel; Palestine	Arabic: حلاوي	Soft, and extremely sweet, small to medium in size.	
Halima	Libya		Halima is a woman's name.	
Hallaw/Taroot	Bahrain			
Hallini	Pakistan; Qatar			
Ḥalwa	Algeria	Arabic: الحلوة		
Ḥamra, Ḥamrah, Ḥamria	Tunisia; Yemen; Libya	Arabic: الحمراء		
Handhal	Oman			
Haoua	Morocco			
Harissa	Djibouti			
Hatimi	Bahrain	Arabic: حاتمي		
Hayany	Egypt; Israel; Palestine		Hayani is a man's name – these dates are dark-red to nearly black and soft.	
Hilali	Bahrain; Kuwait; Qatar; Saudi Arabia	Arabic: هلالي		
Hillawi	Pakistan			
Hissa	Tunisia	Arabic: هيسة	File:HissaDates.JPG	
Hitmi	Qatar			
Hloua	Tunisia	Arabic: الحلوة		
Ḥorra	Tunisia	Arabic: حرة		
Ḥulwa	Saudi Arabia; Iraq	Arabic: الحلوة		
Ḥumri	Bahrain	Arabic: الحميرة		
Hussaini	Pakistan			
Iklane	Morocco			
Ilfodone	Niger			
Imri	Djibouti			
Indi	Sri Lanka	Sinhala: ඉඳ		
Jabiri, Jabri	Bahrain; Oman; Qatar			
Jawan Sour	Pakistan			
Jihel	Morocco			
Jouzi	Kuwait			
Judean date palm	Israel	Arabic: نخل يهودا	An ancient cultivar which, in 2005, was revived from a 2000-year-old seed. This cultivar is originally from the west coast of the Dead Sea.	
KL-1 (Kolak One, Maejo 36)	Indonesia; Malaysia; Thailand	Thai: เคแอล-1		
Kaanihery	Niger			
Kabkab	Iran; Iraq; Syria	Arabic: کبکاب		
Karbaline	Pakistan			
Karwan	Pakistan			
Kasho Wari	Pakistan			
Kathari	Libya			
Kehraba	Pakistan			
Kentichi	Algeria	Arabic: كنتيشي		
Khaḍrawi, Khaḍrawy	Djibouti; India; Iraq; Israel; Palestine; Syria	Arabic: خضراوي	The name is Arabic for 'green'; it is a cultivar favoured by many Arabs. It is a soft, very dark date.	
Khalaṣ	Djibouti; Sudan; Bahrain; India; Kuwait; Oman; Qatar; Saudi Arabia; Syria	Arabic: خلاص	One of the major palm cultivars in Saudi Arabia. Its fruit is called Khlaṣ (خلاص). Notably produced in Hofuf (Al-Ahsa) and Qatif in the Eastern Province of Saudi Arabia (ash-Sharqīyah).	
Kharbalian	Pakistan			
Khaṣab	Kuwait; Oman	Arabic: الخصاب		
Kisba, Kasbat - Asfoor	Djibouti; Bahrain	Arabic: كسبة		
Khaṣouee	Iran	Persian: خاصوئی		
Khastawi	Iraq; Syria	Arabic: خستاوي	The leading soft date in Iraq; it is syrupy and small in size, prized for dessert.	
Khawaja	Bahrain			
Khenaizi, Khunaizi, Khuneizi, Khinaizy, Khineze	Saudi Arabia; Bahrain; Oman; India; Sudan; Syria; United Arab Emirates	Arabic: الخنيزي		
Khiḍri	Palestine	Arabic: خضري		
Khoḍry	Saudi Arabia	Arabic: خضري		
Khyarah	Kuwait	Arabic: خياره		
Kinta, Kenta	Tunisia	Arabic: كنتة		
Koîdi Bichanga	Chad			
Koîdi Dellémadow	Chad			
Koîdow	Chad			
Kougoudou	Chad			
Kouhi	Chad			
Koukouma	Niger			
Kourdow	Chad			
Krouskrous	Niger			
Kulma	Sudan			
Kupro	Pakistan			
Kustawy	Palestine	Arabic: خستاوي		
Lagou	Tunisia	Arabic: اللاقو		
Lakhdira	Mauritania			
Lamdina	Mauritania			
Largos	Spain			
Lemsi	Tunisia			
Léon	Spain			
Libyan Deglet	Libya			
Litima	Algeria			
Lohandjé	Chad			
Lolo, Lolwi, Lulu	Syria; Kuwait; United Arab Emirates			
Louted	Mauritania			
Mabroom (Barni Al-Ola)	Saudi Arabia	Arabic: مبروم	A large, elongated date	
Mabsli	Oman			
Madina	Sudan			
Madini	Yemen			
Madloki	Oman			
Mahboula	Mauritania			
Mah-Lbaïd	Morocco			
Maiwa	Niger			
Maktoom, Maktoomi, Maktoumi	Syria; Kuwait; Saudi Arabia	Arabic: مكتومي	Large, red-brown, thick-skinned, soft, medium-sweet date.	
Malkaby	Egypt			
Malṭi	Tunisia	Arabic: مالطي		
Manakbir			A large fruit that ripens early.	
Marchiano	Chad			
Marraner	Spain			
Masli, Masili	Oman; Somalia; Yemen			
Maazwati	Pakistan			
Méboul	Chad			
Mech Degla	Algeria			
Medjool (Mujhoolah)	Djibouti; Morocco; Chile; Peru; United States; India; Israel; Kuwait; Palestine; Saudi Arabia; Syria	Arabic: المجهول	A large, sweet and succulent date.	
Méguirti	Chad			
Mékléya	Chad			
Mékoîdi	Chad			
Mekt	Morocco			
Meneifi	Saudi Arabia	Arabic: منيفي		
Merziban	Bahrain	Arabic: المرزبان		
Mestali	Morocco			
Météréli	Chad			
Métoukouli	Chad			
Mgmaget Ayuob	Hun, Libya			
Mijraf	Yemen			
Mishriq, Mishrig	Sudan	Arabic: مشرق, meaning 'east'	Wad Khateeb and Wad Laggai varieties in Sudan	
Miskani	Saudi Arabia	Arabic: مسكاني		
Momeg	Yemen			
Mordaseng	Iran			
Moscatel	Spain			
Mourudow	Chad			
Mozafati, Mazafati, Muzawati	Afghanistan; Iran; Pakistan	Persian: مضافتی, meaning 'suburban' or 'peripheral'	Dark, fleshy and sweet date of medium size with a relatively high moisture content and is suited for fresh consumption, i.e. not dried. At a temperature of −5 °C (23 °F) it can be kept for up to 2 years.	
Mriziga	Mauritania			
Mubashir	Bahrain			
Mudallal	Bahrain			
Muwaji	Bahrain			
Nabtat Ali	Saudi Arabia	Arabic: نبتة علي		
Nabtat Saif	Bahrain; Saudi Arabia; Syria	Arabic: نبتة سيف		
Nabtat Sulṭan	Saudi Arabia	Arabic: نبتة سلطان		
Nabut Sultan	Djibouti			
Naghal	Oman			
Najda	Morocco			
Nebut Seif	Kuwait; Qatar	Arabic: نبوت سيف		
Nemahan	Somalia			
Niqal	Qatar			
Noyet Meka	Libya			
Omglaib	Libya			
Oraiby	Egypt			
Otakin	Pakistan			
Oum Arich	Mauritania			
Oum-N’hal	Morocco			
Oumo-Assala	Djibouti			
Outoukdime	Morocco			
Pashpag	Pakistan			
Piarom	Iran		A large, thin-skinned, black-brown semi-dry date.	
Qanṭar	Kuwait	Arabic: قنطار		
Qash	Oman			
Qashmak	Qatar			
Qaṭarah	Saudi Arabia	Arabic: قطاره		
Rabbi, Rabai	Iran; Pakistan	Persian: ربی		
Rabia	Saudi Arabia	Arabic: ربيعة		
Ras Lahmer, Ras Ltmar	Morocco			
Roghni	Pakistan			
Rojo	Spain			
Roṭab	Iran, Iraq	Arabic: رطب	Dark and soft.	
Ruthana, Rotana	Saudi Arabia; Qatar	Arabic: روثانة		
Ruzeiz, Rzaiz, Rzizi	Saudi Arabia; Bahrain; Djibouti	Arabic: الرزيز		
Sabaka	Saudi Arabia	Arabic: سباكة		
Ṣabo	Bahrain	Arabic: الصبو		
Ṣafawi	Saudi Arabia	Arabic: صفاوي	Mainly grown in the Al-Madina region. Soft, semi-dried date variety; distinctive deep black colour, length and medium size. Share similarities with Ajwa dates such as taste.	
Ṣafrir	Israel	Hebrew: צפריר	Red colored sweet dates that can be eaten immediately after being harvested from the tree	
Sahcari	Somalia			
Saiedi, Saidi	Libya		Soft, very sweet, these are popular in Libya.	
Saila	Libya		Soft, very sweet, these are popular in Libya.	
Saïrlayalate	Morocco			
Sakkoty	Egypt			
Salani	Oman			
Salmadina	Mauritania			
Samany	Egypt			
Samaran	Kuwait			
Sari	Saudi Arabia	Arabic: سري		
Sayer	Iran; Iraq	Arabic for 'common'	Dark orange-brown, of medium size, soft and syrupy.	
Seedling	Sudan			
Ṣefri, Ṣufry	Saudi Arabia	Arabic: صفري		
Ṣegae	Saudi Arabia	Arabic: صقعي		
Sellaj	Saudi Arabia	Arabic: سلّج		
Selmi	Bahrain			
Serfateh	Yemen			
Setrawi	Bahrain			
Sewi	India			
Shabibi	Bahrain			
Shahabi	Syria			
Shahal, Shahl	Saudi Arabia; Oman	Arabic: شهل		
Shahani	Iran	Arabic: شاهانی		
Shambari	Bahrain			
Shamiya	Egypt			
Shamran	India			
Shebebi	Saudi Arabia	Arabic: الشبيبي		
Sheeri	Djibouti			
Shaishi, Shishi	Saudi Arabia; Bahrain; Kuwait; Qatar	Arabic: الشيشي		
Sils	Bahrain			
Siwy	Egypt			
Sokotri	Yemen			
Soukani	Mauritania			
Sukkari, Suckari, Sokeri	Saudi Arabia; Kuwait; Libya	Arabic: سكري, meaning 'sugar' or 'sweet one'	Yellow skinned; faintly resilient and extremely sweet, often referred to as 'royal dates'. It is arguably the most expensive and premium variety.	
Sullaj	Saudi Arabia	Arabic: سلج		
Suqadari	Somalia			
Tadmainte	Morocco			
Tafezwin	Algeria			
Taghayat	Niger			
Tagiat	Libya			
Takarmust, Takermest	Algeria; Tunisia			
Talharma	Niger			
Talis	Libya			
Talittat	Niger			
Tameg	Libya			
Tamezwert	Algeria			
Tanghal	Niger			
Tanjoob	Bahrain			
Tantbucht	Algeria			
Taqerbucht	Algeria			
Tarahim	Qatar			
Tawragh	Niger			
Ṭayyar, Ṭayer	Saudi Arabia; Bahrain	Arabic: الطيار		
Tenat	Spain			
Tendre Dolz	Spain			
Tezerzayet, Touzerzayet	Tunisia	Arabic: توزرزايت	Kahla and Safra varieties	
Thoory (Thuri)	Algeria		Popular in Algeria, this dry date is brown-red when cured with a bluish bloom and very wrinkled skin. Its flesh is sometimes hard and brittle but the flavour described as sweet and nutty.	
Tha'al (Manasif)	Yemen			
Tidirchi or Toudourchi	Niger			
Tiernos, Tendre	Spain			
Tifred	Mauritania			
Tiguedert	Mauritania			
Tijeb	Mauritania			
Tilmoiran or Cliyarom	Niger			
Timjuhart	Algeria			
Tinterguel	Mauritania			
Tinwazid	Mauritania			
Tirtidou	Chad			
Tissibi	Algeria			
Tota	Pakistan			
Touzouwzaw	Niger			
Trasferit	Libya			
Tronja	Tunisia	Arabic: ترنجة		
Tubaig	Yemen			
Tunisi (Deglet Noor)	Sudan			
Um Raḥeem, Um Raḥim	Saudi Arabia; Bahrain	Arabic: أم رحيم		
Um Sella	Oman			
Um Al-Dehn	Kuwait			
Um Al-Jwary	Libya			
Um Al-Khashab	Saudi Arabia		Brilliant red skin; bittersweet, hard white flesh	
Verdal	Spain			
Wallo	Chad			
Wannana	Saudi Arabia	Arabic: ونانة		
Ward	Qatar			
Wardanga	Chad			
Waserdow	Chad			
Zabad	Oman			
Zaghloul	Egypt; India; Syria	Arabic: زغلول	Dark red skin, long, and very crunchy when fresh (when they are typically served); extremely sweet, with sugar content creating a sense of desiccation in the mouth when eaten. This variety is essentially exclusive to Egypt, where it is subject to an element of nationalist sentiment on account of sharing a name with national hero Saad Zaghloul.	
Zahidi	Djibouti; Chile; Peru; India; Iran; Iraq; Israel; Palestine; Syria	Arabic: الزهدي; Persian: زاهدی	Medium-sized, cylindrical, light golden-brown semi-dry dates are very sugary, and sold as soft, medium-hard and hard. Arabic for 'ascetic'.	
Zalao	Chad			
Zebur	Libya			
Zurghi (Makkawy)	Yemen			

== See also ==
- Date cultivation in Dar al-Manasir#Date cultivars
