= Sukkari =

Date palm cultivar

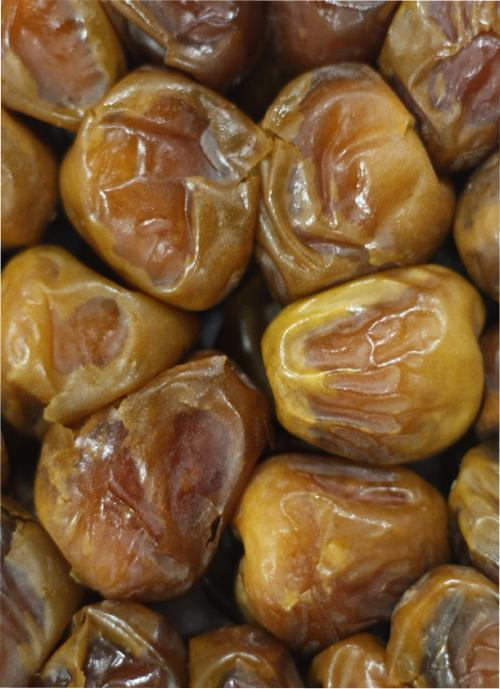
- Genus: Phoenix
- Species: Phoenix dactylifera
- Origin: Al-Qassim, Saudi Arabia

Sukkari or sukkary (Arabic: سكري) is a cultivar of the palm date that is widely grown in Saudi Arabia. Its skin is light yellow or golden brown. Sukkari dates are soft and extremely sweet.

== See also ==
- List of date cultivars
- Mazafati, a soft, sweet date cultivar from Iran
