= Fard (date) =

Date palm cultivar

- Genus: Phoenix
- Species: Phoenix dactylifera
- Origin: Oman

Fard or Fardh (Arabic: فرض) is a cultivar of the palm date that is widely grown in Oman. It has black skin and small seeds. Fard dates ship well and do not tend to developed wrinkled skin.

== See also ==
- List of date cultivars
- Dates in Oman (Arabic Wikipedia)
