= Khalas (date) =

Date palm cultivar

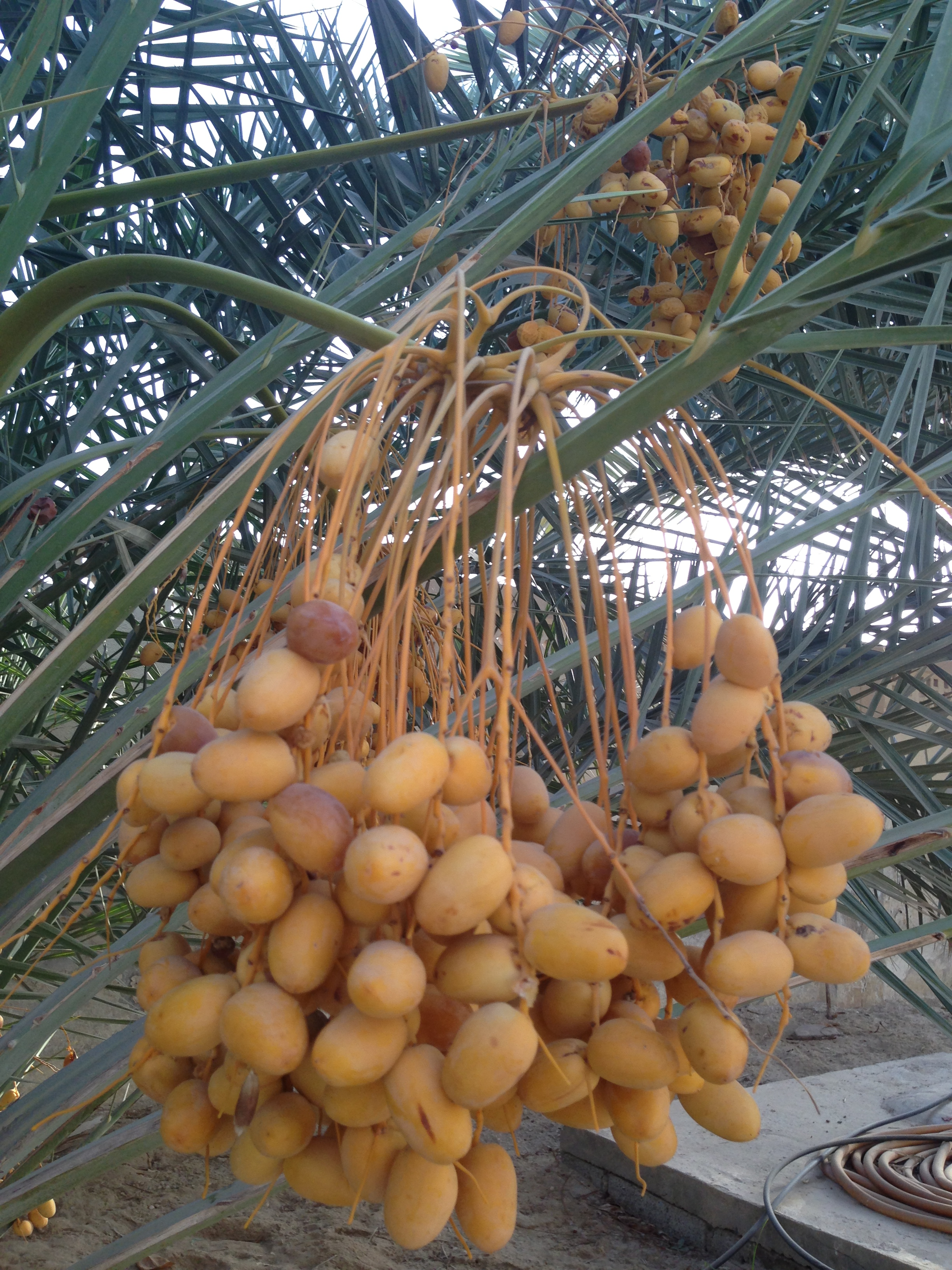
- Khalas dates prior to harvesting
- Genus: Phoenix
- Species: Phoenix dactylifera
- Origin: Saudi Arabia, United Arab Emirates, Oman

Khalas (Arabic: خلاص) is a cultivar of the palm date that is widely grown in eastern Saudi Arabia, the United Arab Emirates and the Persian Gulf region and taking up a large percentage of the farmlands in Oman and regarded as the original cultivar in the region. One of the most expensive varieties of Emirati date, it has brown skin.

In the Emirates, a major producer of dates globally, researchers have converted khalas date seeds into biofuel. Some million tonnes per annum of date seeds are produced from the UAE's 40 million palms, 10 per cent of which can be extracted as oils. It has been estimated this could create up to 100,000 tonnes of oil for conversion into biofuel. The UAE is the seventh major date producing country in the world, comprising 6% of the world's total date production, with Liwa in the country's western region being a major source of production.

== See also ==
- List of date cultivars
- Zahidi (date)
