= Rabbi (date) =

Date palm cultivar

- Genus: Phoenix
- Species: Phoenix dactylifera
- Origin: Iran

Rabbi (Persian: ربی) is a cultivar of the palm date that is widely grown in Iran (especially in Balochistan and Kerman) as well as in Pakistan.

== Overview ==
The date has an elongated shape, and its skin has a reddish hue. As a semi-dry date, it can be stored for long periods of time due to its low moisture content.

== See also ==
- List of date cultivars
