= Ajwa (date) =

Date palm cultivar

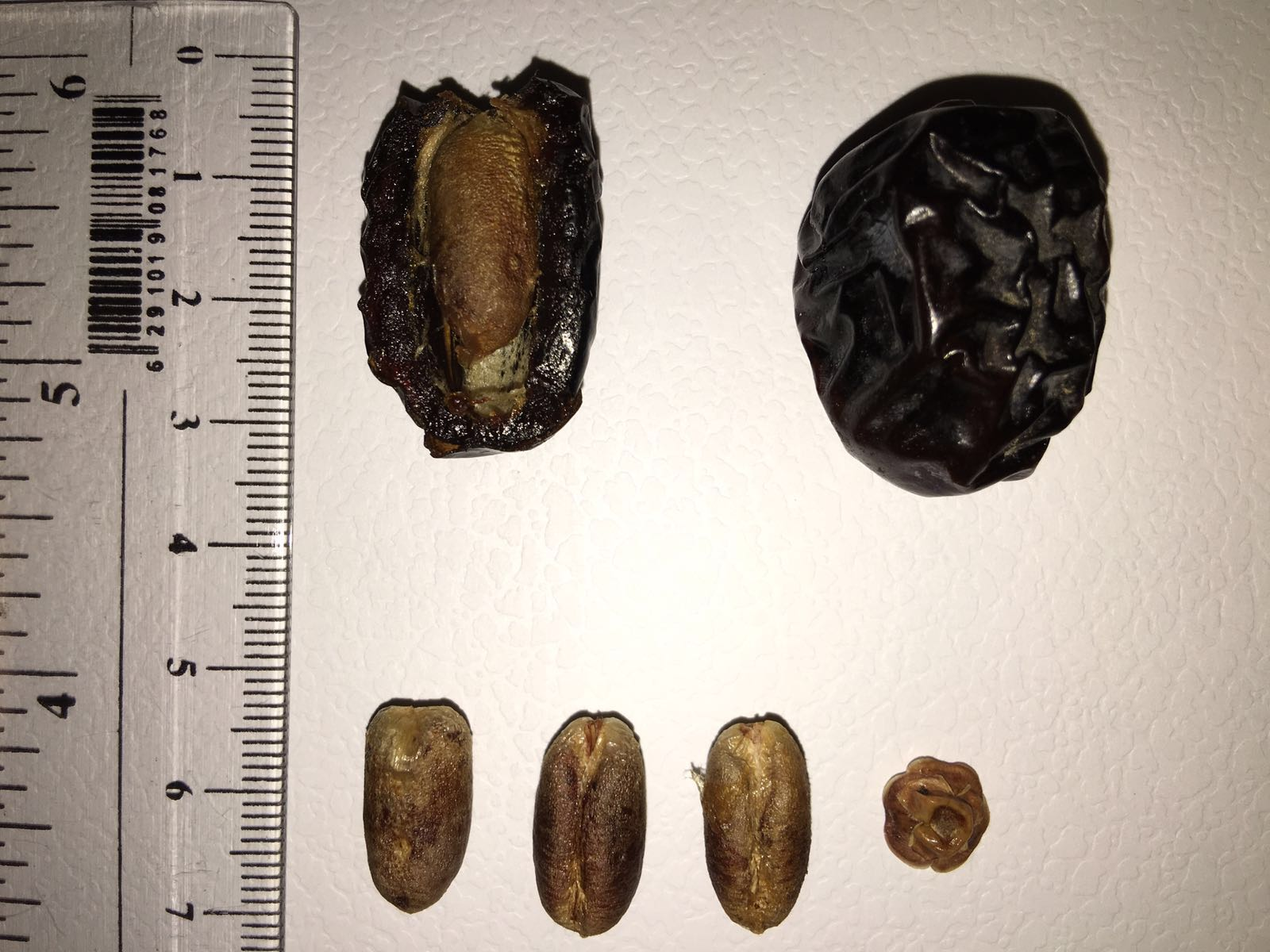
- Genus: Phoenix
- Species: Phoenix dactylifera
- Origin: Medina, Saudi Arabia

Ajwa (Arabic: عجوة) is a cultivar of the palm date widely grown in Medina, Saudi Arabia. It is oval-shaped and medium-sized with black skin.

Ajwa plantations surround Medina and thousands of tons are exported from them annually. However, it is not exclusive to Medina and is grown elsewhere on the Arabian peninsula and in the Sahara desert.

It is often consumed on Iftar during the month of Ramadan and other Islamic religious events, since it has traditional associations with the Islamic prophet Muhammad.

== Nutritional content ==
A commercial brand of ajwa dates (per 100 g) was reported to contain 350 calories, 82.5 g carbohydrates, 2.5 g protein, and 0 g fat, along with 20 g sugars, 7.5 g fiber, 50 mg calcium, 1 mg iron, 875 mg potassium, 0 mg sodium, and 0 mg cholesterol.
