= Zahidi (date) =

Date palm cultivar

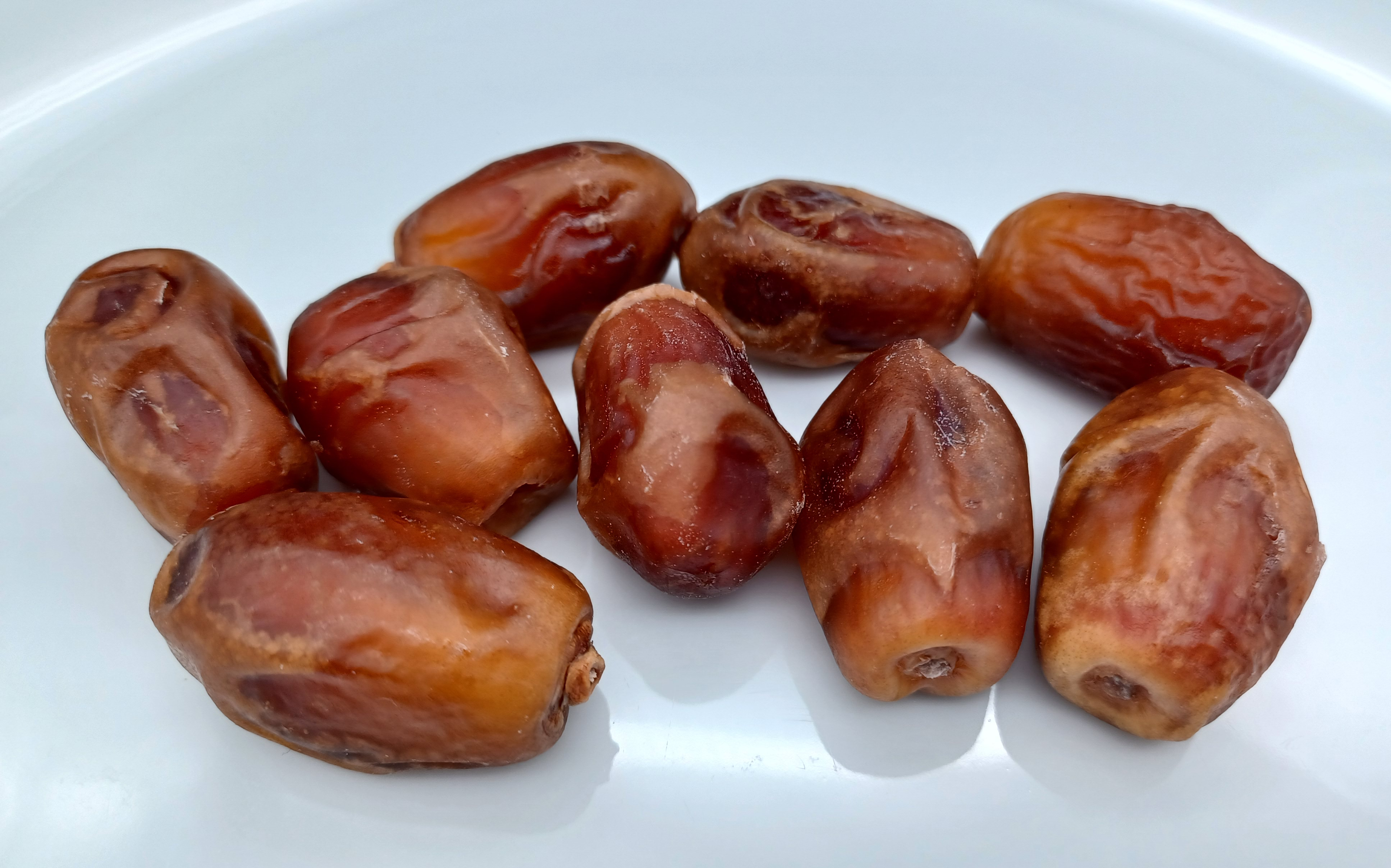
- Genus: Phoenix
- Species: Phoenix dactylifera
- Cultivar: Zahidi
- Origin: Iraq

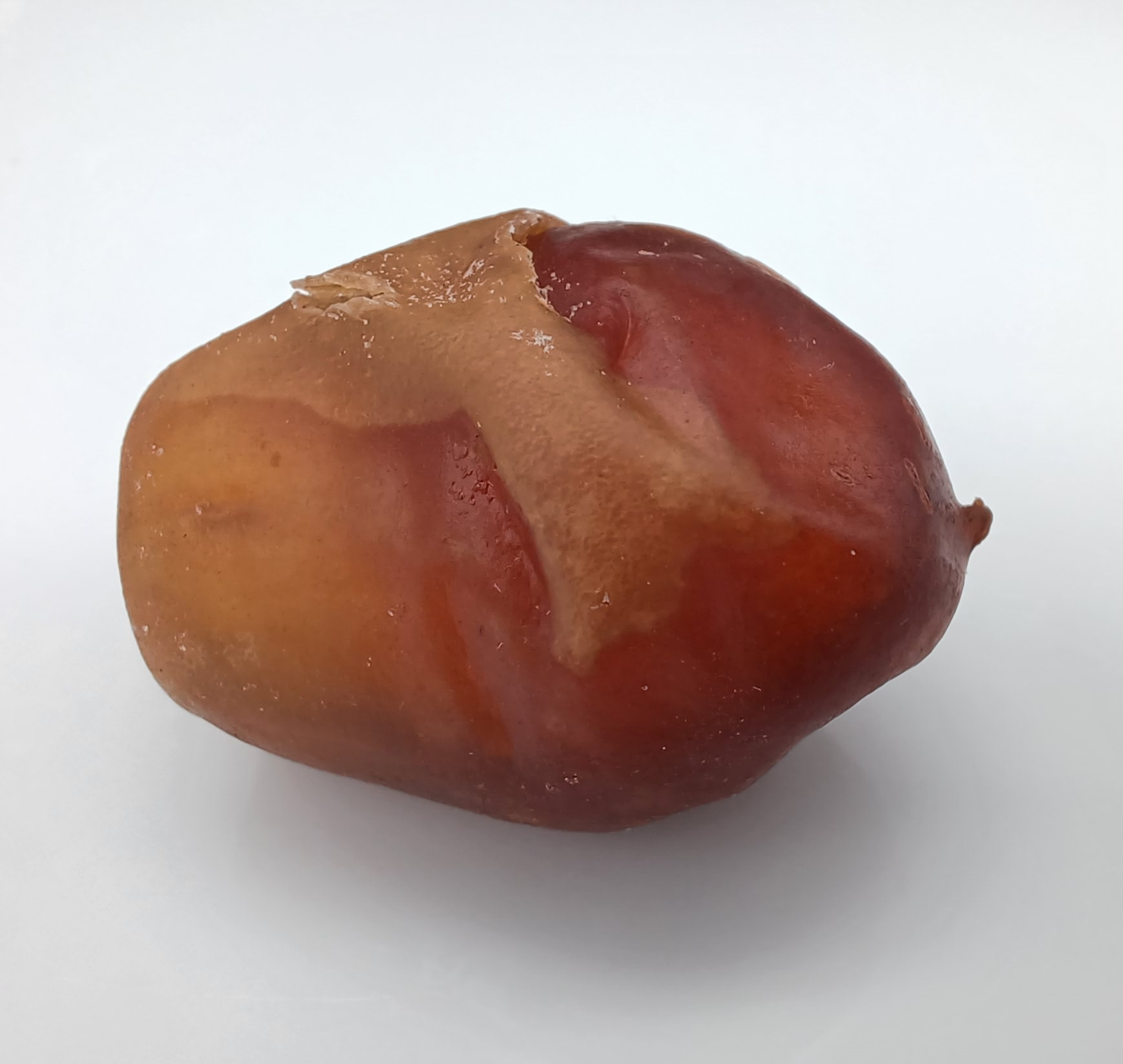
A zahidi date

Zahidi (Arabic: زهدي) is a cultivar of the palm date that originated in Iraq. It has light brown skin. It is a semi-dry date of medium size that is very sweet. Zahidi dates ship well and are widely exported.

It is the most widely grown date cultivar in Iraq, with about 6 million planted trees as of 2015. In Iraq, the average annual yield is 73 kg per tree, although yields can often exceed 100 kg. Other than Iraq, it is also grown in Djibouti, Chile, Peru, California, Arizona, United Arab Emirates, India, Iran, Israel, Palestine, and Syria.

Zahidi date palms are also highly valued for landscaping.

== Etymology ==
Zahidi is the Arabic word for "ascetic." The name of the date cultivar may have also been derived from Zahidi in the Basra region of southern Iraq.

== See also ==
- List of date cultivars
