= Medjool =

Date cultivar

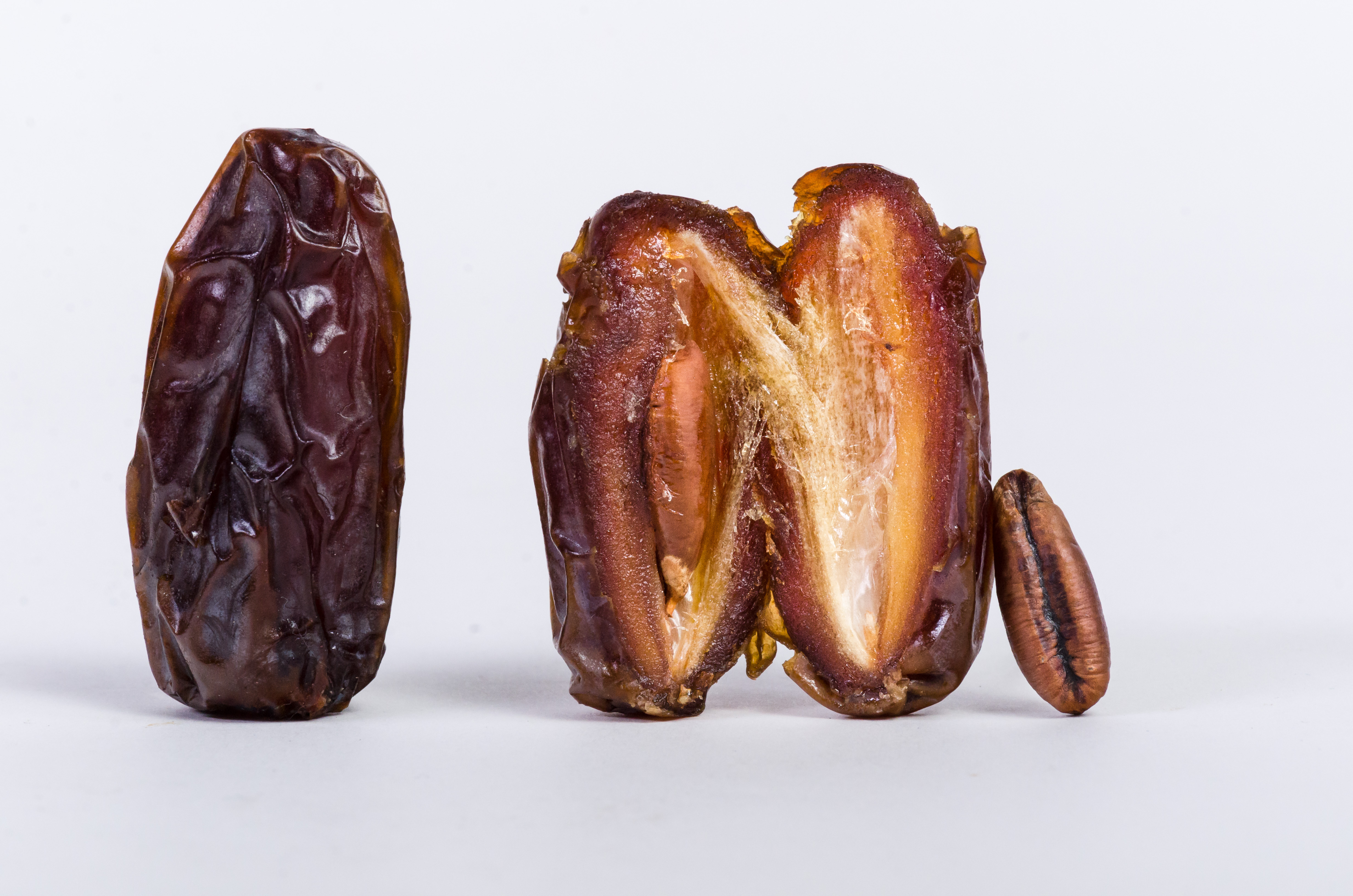
- Genus: Phoenix
- Species: Phoenix dactylifera
- Origin: Tafilalt, Morocco

The Medjool date (Arabic: تمر المجهول - tamar al-majhūl. Tamar means 'date' and majhūl means 'unknown', from جَهِلَ jahila, 'to not know') also known as Medjoul, Mejhoul or Majhool, is a large, sweet cultivated variety of date (Phoenix dactylifera). It is an important commercial variety constituting some 25% of worldwide trade in dates.

== Landrace ==
The Medjool cultivar originates from the Tafilalt region of Morocco, where it is still grown. Outside Morocco, it is grown in the United States, Israel, Palestine, Iran, Saudi Arabia, South Africa, and Jordan. The variety is planted both for its fruit and for landscaping.

The medjool is a distinct landrace, described as producing "large soft fruit, with orange-yellowish flesh, and a mildly rich and pleasing flavor". Being large, soft, and with a "caramel, honey" flavor, the variety has been called "the king of dates".

== Constituents ==
Medjool dates are high in oxalates (18–233 mg/100 g dry weight).

Out of the over 3000 known cultivars of dates, only two contain the disaccharide sugar sucrose: Deglet Nour and Medjool. All the rest contain the monosaccharides glucose and fructose in a mix known as invert sugar. Sucrose tastes sweeter than glucose but less sweet than fructose; the mix is less sweet than pure fructose, but still is somewhat sweeter than sucrose.

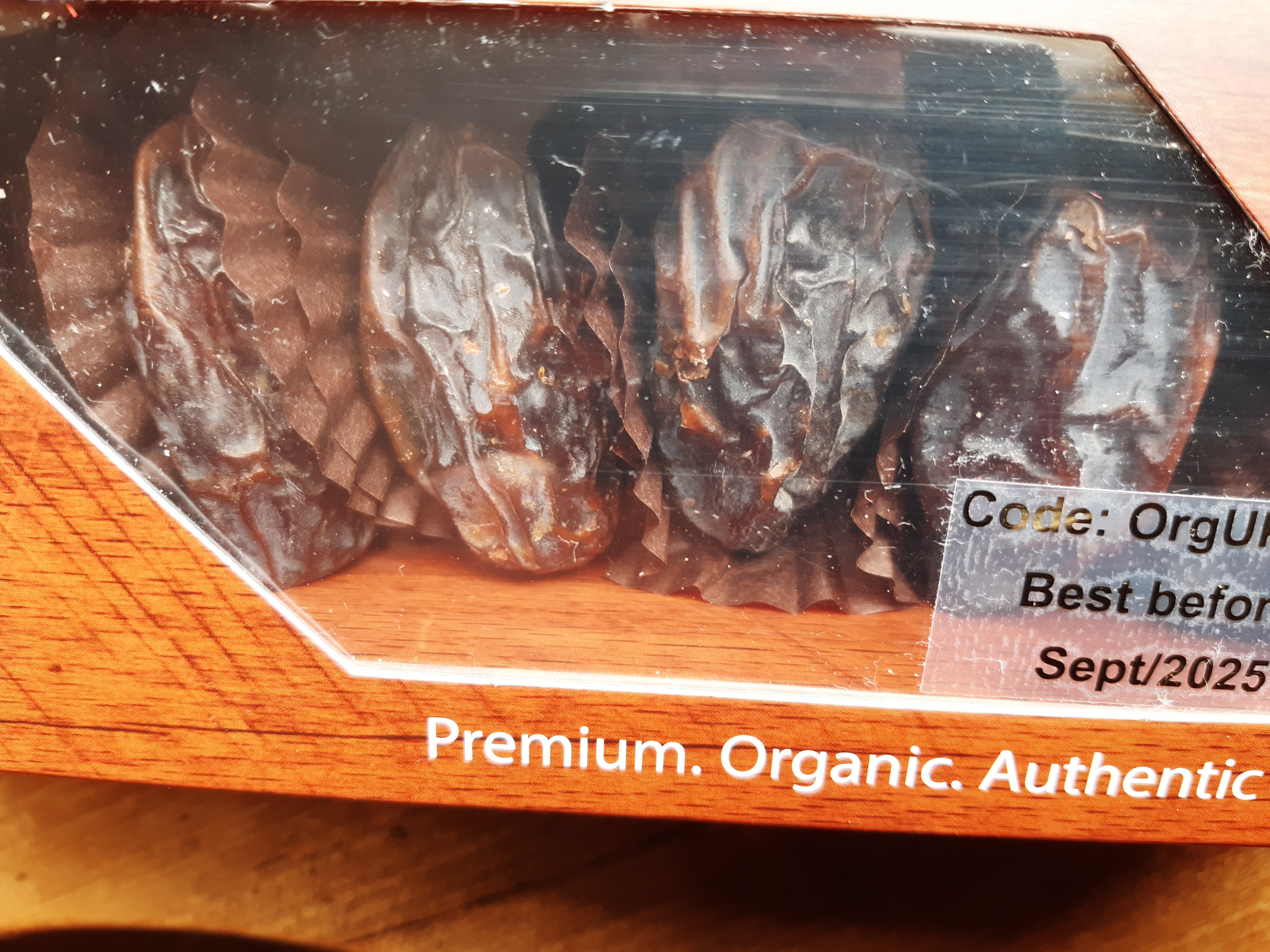
Large Medjool dates are sold as a luxury product.

== Trade ==
In 2013, Israel held more than 60 percent of the global medjool market share. In 2024, Medjool constituted 25% of the world export market for dates. Those supplied to France, the largest European importer of dates, are predominantly from Algeria and Tunisia. Retail brands in both France and Italy often label the cultivar, usually Medjool or Deglet Nour, on the packet. Especially large Medjool dates are sold as a luxury product, for example in the Netherlands.
