= Wild date palm =

Wild date palm is a common name for several plants and may refer to:

- Senegal date palm, Phoenix reclinata
- Silver date palm, Phoenix sylvestris
