= Mazafati =

Date palm cultivar

'Mazafati' date
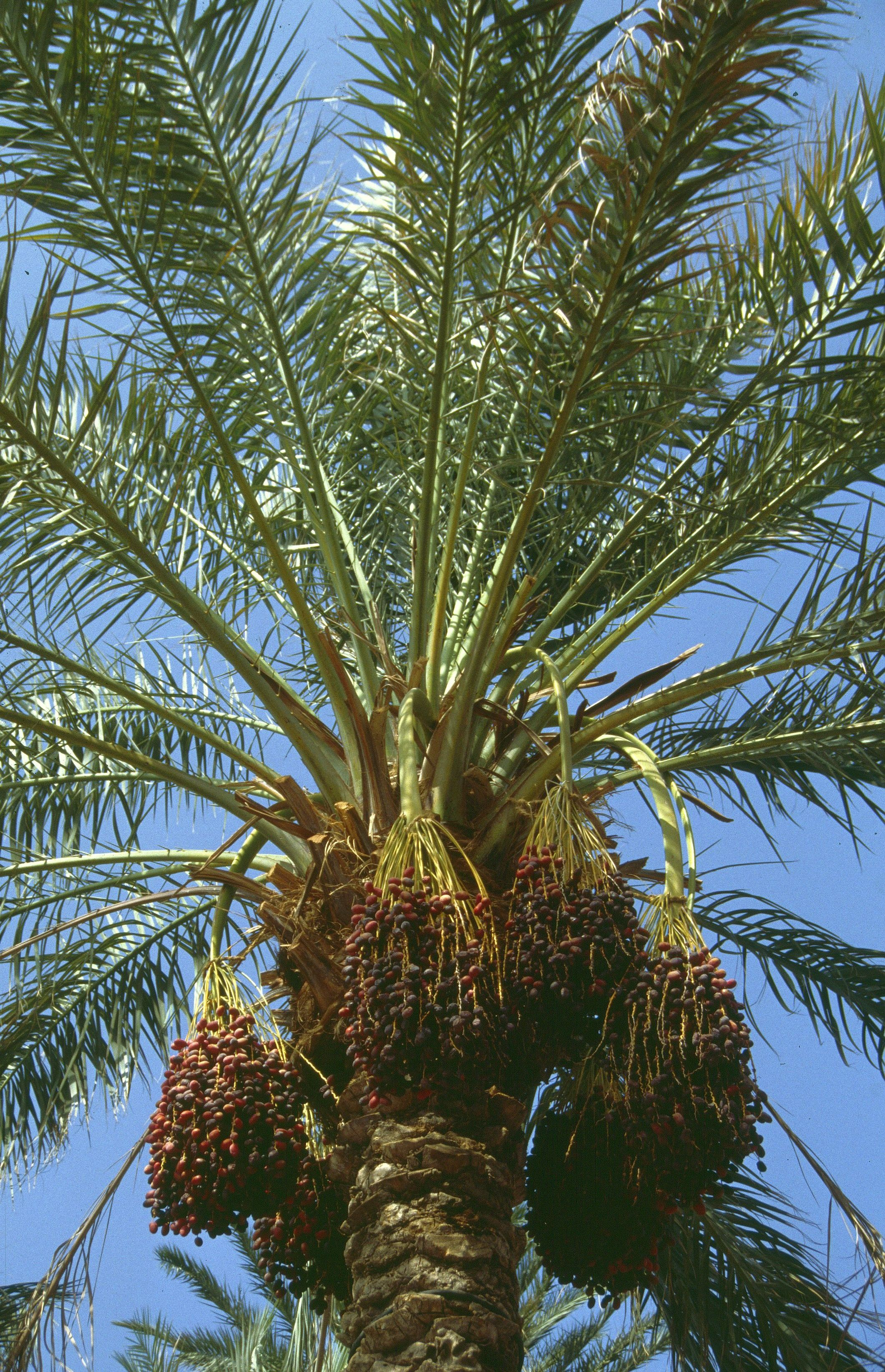
- Mazafati date palm in Bam
- Genus: Phoenix
- Species: Phoenix dactylifera
- Cultivar: 'Mazafati'
- Origin: Iran

Mazafati (Persian: مضافتی; or mozafati and Bam date; also called muzati in Balochi) is a cultivar of the palm date. It is a dark, soft, fleshy and sweet date of medium size, about 2.5–4.5 cm (1–2 in) with a relatively high moisture content of between 32 and 35%, varying with the time of harvest and the location of the grow.

== Areas of cultivation ==
Mazafati dates are grown in southern Iran, mainly in Bam, Jiroft and Kahnuj in Kerman province; in Saravan, Nikshahr, Haji Abad, and Iranshahr in Sistan-o-Baluchestan province; as well as in Pakistan, in Panjgur, Parom and Buleda in the province of Balochistan.

As one of the largest growing regions of Mazafati dates, the Bam region has around 28,000 ha (69,000 acres) under cultivation, of which about 5,000 ha (12,000 acres) are for young palm trees. It is estimated that Mazafati dates account for 20% of Iran's total date exports. Approximately 120,000 tons are harvested from the land annually. Mazafati date palms can stay in production for over 60 years.

== Consumption ==
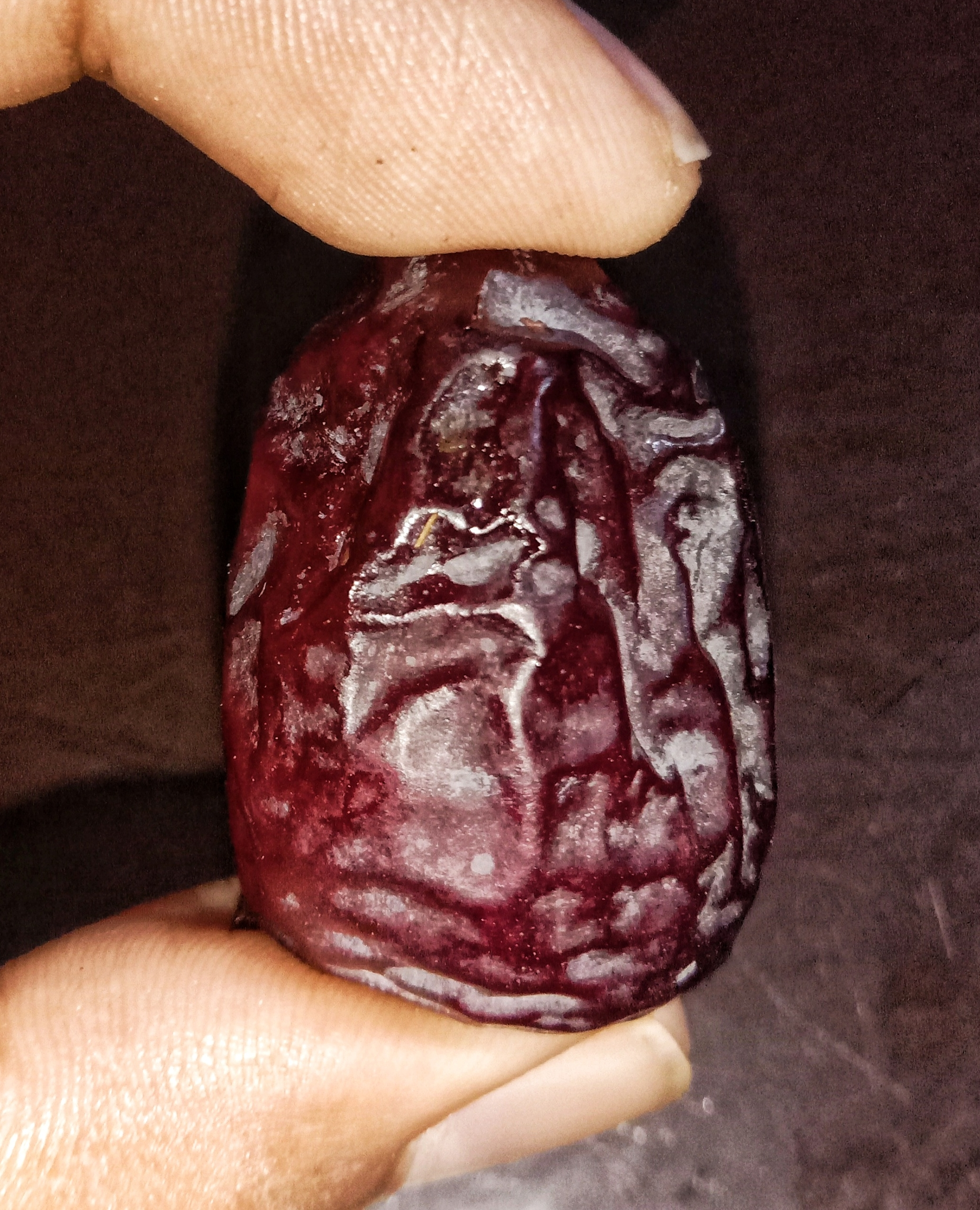
A fresh Mazafati date

The date is suited for fresh consumption, i.e., not dried. At a temperature of −5 °C (23 °F) it can be kept for up to two years or at 0–5 °C (32–41 °F) it can be kept for one year. Mazafati date harvesting time depends on the variety and starts in August, lasting to the end of October.

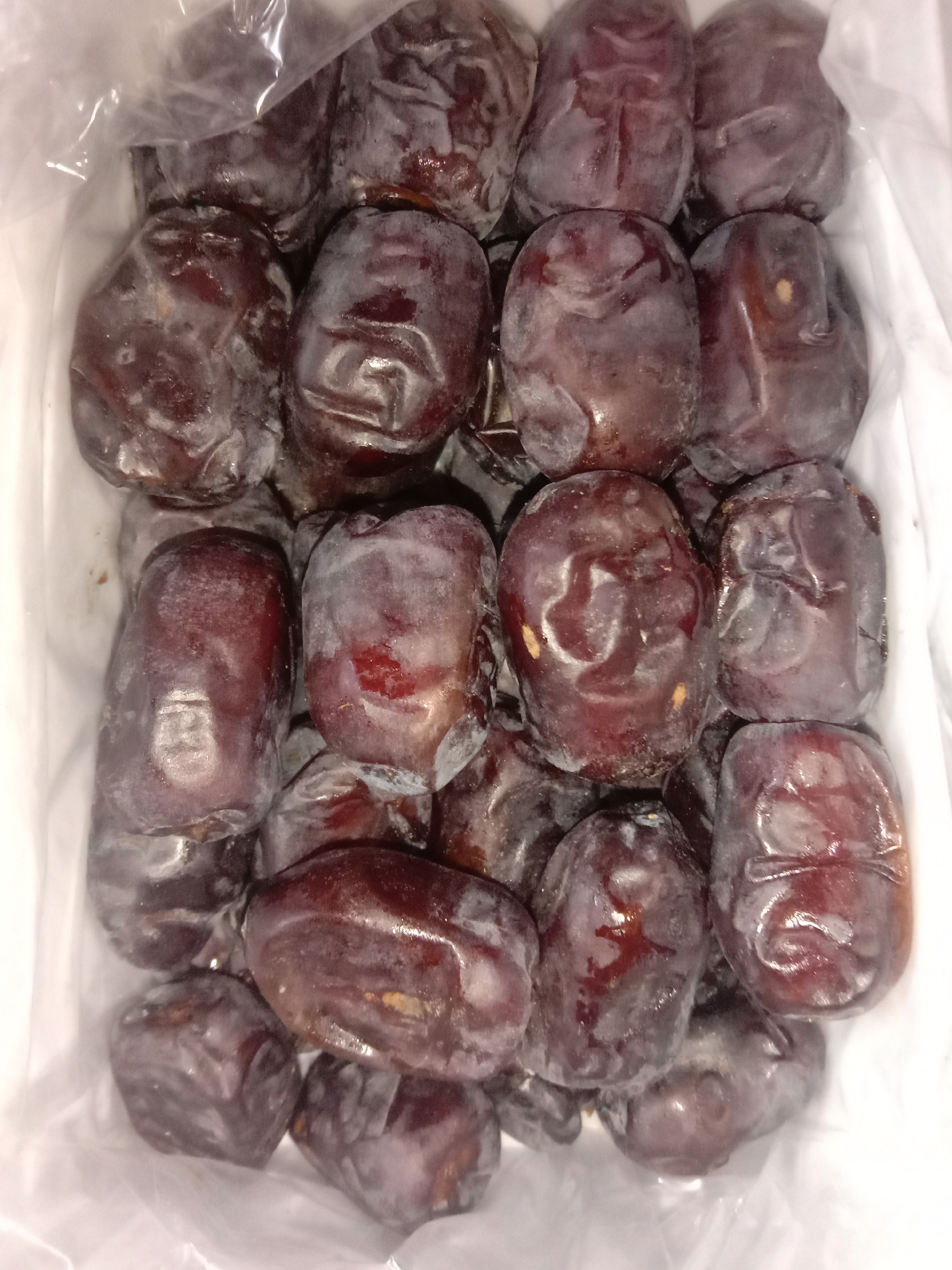
Soft mazafati dates from Iran

This variety is the most common variety of fresh dates for snacking and table eating. The dates are a valuable source of various vitamins and minerals and are high in fiber (see Nutrition section below). Though Mazafati dates are popular in many countries, exports have been badly affected by international sanctions.

== Content and nutrition ==
Dates, Mazafati
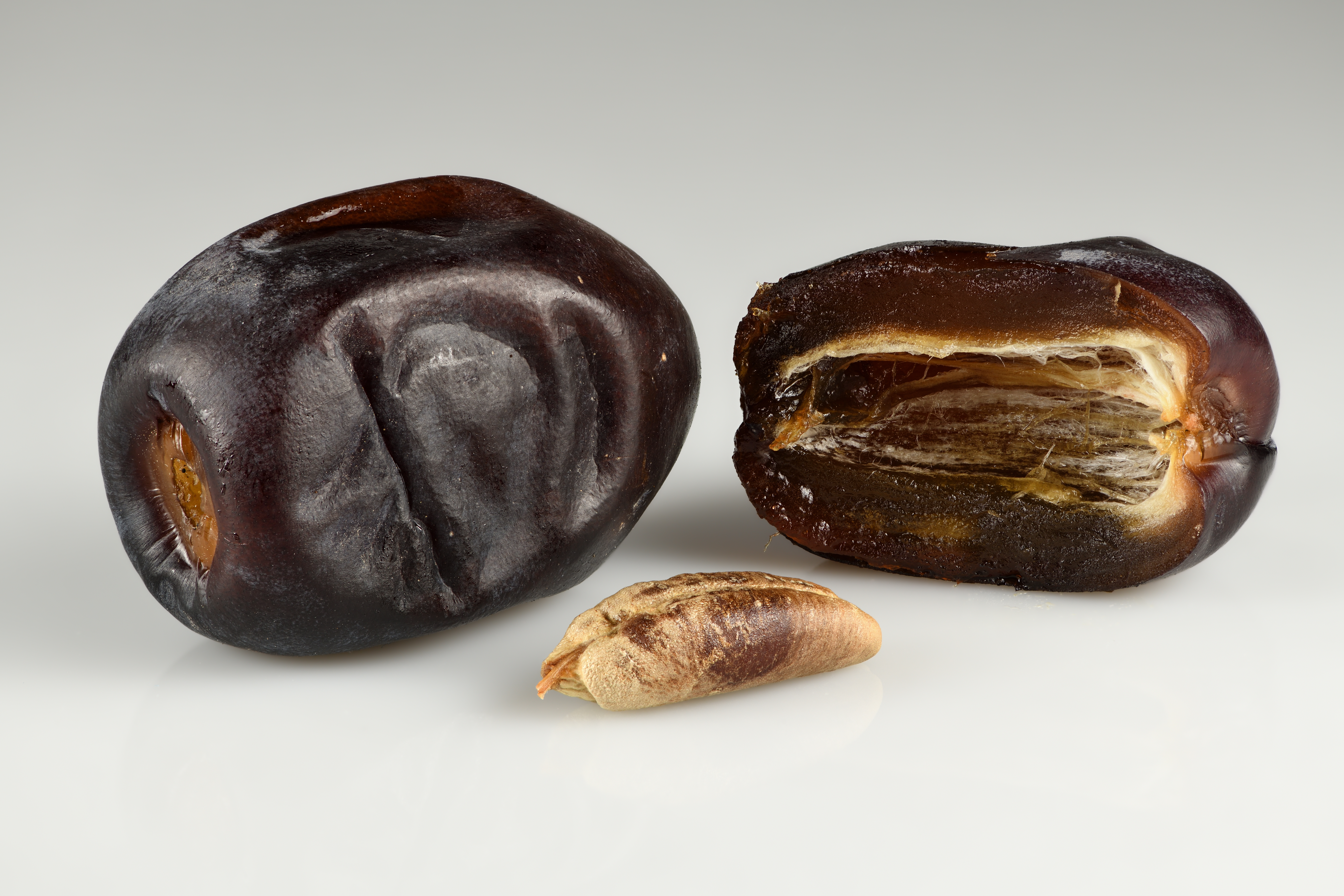

Nutritional value per 100 g
- Energy: 1,105 kJ (264 kcal)
- Carbohydrates: 51 g
- Sugars: 46 g
- Dietary fiber: 8.5 g
- Fat: 5.6 g
- Protein: 1.61 g
Vitamins and minerals
Minerals	Quantity %DV^{†}
Calcium	23% 28-60 mg
Iron	14% 2.6 mg
Phosphorus	4% 50 mg
Sodium	1% 16 mg
- ^{†}Percentages estimated using US recommendations for adults.

Mazafati date seeds are made up of 7.7–9.7% oil and make up 5.6–14.2% of the date's weight. They contain 7.17–9% moisture, 1.83–5.3% protein, 6.8–9.32% fat, 65.5% carbohydrates, 6.4–13.6% fiber, and 0.89–1.57% ash, as well as sterols, estrone, and an alkali-soluble polysaccharide. The fatty acids in the oil are 8% lauric, 4% myristic, 25% palmitic, 10% stearic, 45% oleic, and 10% linoleic acid, (Note: These percentages do not add up to 100% due to rounding.) as well as small amounts of caprylic and capric acid.

The dates contain micronutrients including calcium, magnesium, potassium, vitamin A, vitamin B complex and vitamin C. They are also low in fat and high in fiber and protein content. Like all dates, they are high in simple carbohydrates (sugars).
