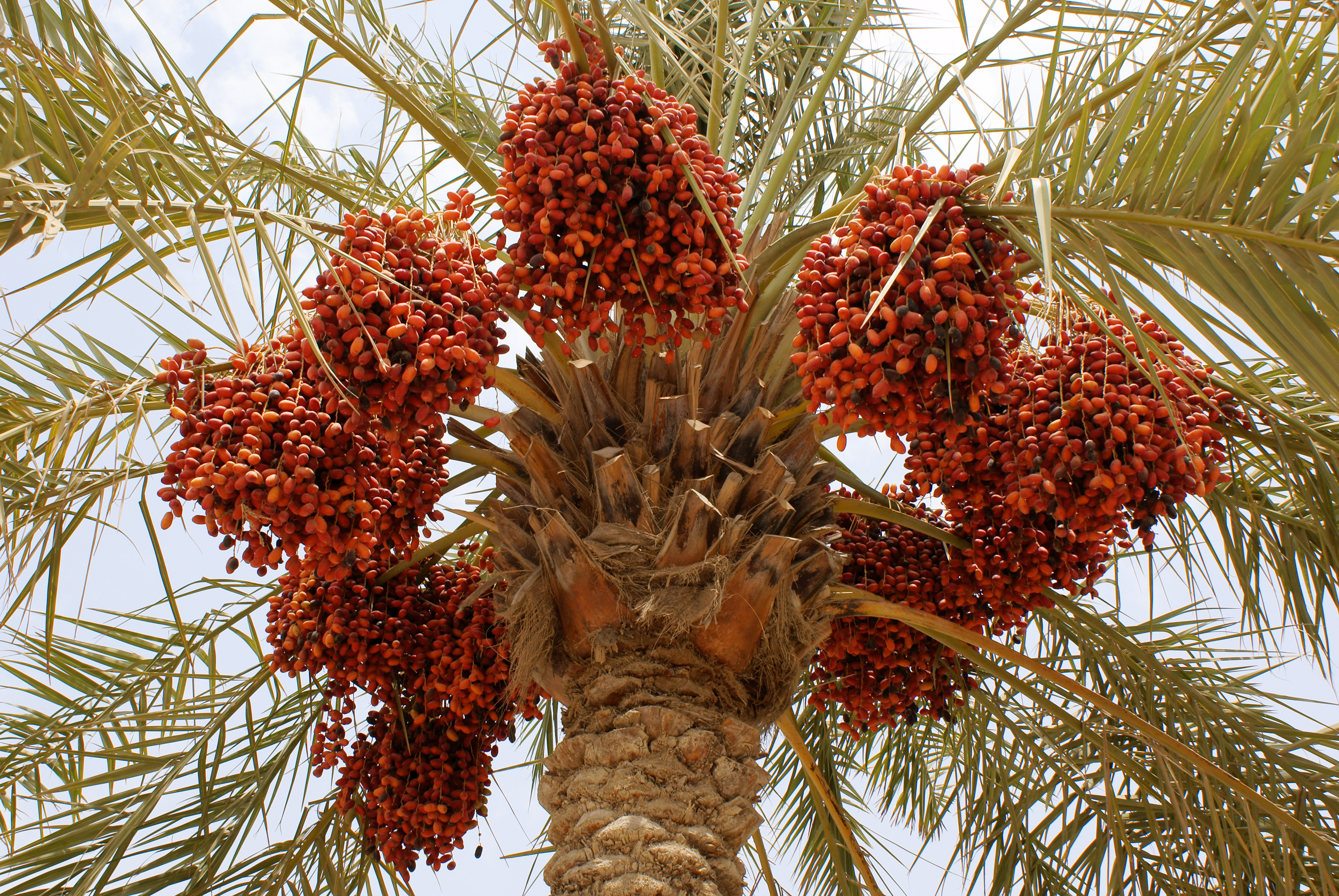

Scientific classification
- Kingdom: Plantae
- Clade: Tracheophytes
- Clade: Angiosperms
- Clade: Monocots
- Clade: Commelinids
- Order: Arecales
- Family: Arecaceae
- Genus: Phoenix
- Species: P. dactylifera

Binomial name
- Phoenix dactylifera L.

Synonyms
- Palma dactylifera (L.) Mill.; Phoenix chevalieri D.Rivera, S.Ríos & Obón; Phoenix iberica D.Rivera, S.Ríos & Obón

= Date palm =

Palm tree cultivated for its sweet fruit

Phoenix dactylifera, commonly known as the date palm, is a flowering-plant species in the palm family Arecaceae, native to the region from the Gulf States and Iraq to Pakistan and India. It is cultivated for its edible sweet fruit called dates. The species is widely cultivated across northern Africa, the Middle East, Australia, South and Southeast Asia, the coastal Mediterranean basin, and Southern California. It is naturalised in many tropical and subtropical regions worldwide. P. dactylifera is the type species of genus Phoenix, which contains 12–19 species of wild date palms.

Date palms reach up to 30 metres (98 ft) in height, growing singly or in clumps with several stems from a single root system. Slow-growing, they can reach over 100 years of age when maintained properly. Their fruits are oval-cylindrical, 3 to 7 centimetres (1 to 3 inches) long, and about 2.5 cm (1 in) in diameter, with colour ranging from dark brown to bright red or yellow, depending on variety. Containing 63–64% sugar by mass when dried, dates are consumed as sweet snacks on their own or with confections.

There is archaeological evidence of date cultivation in Arabia since the 6th millennium BCE. Dates are "emblematic of oasis agriculture and highly symbolic in Christian and Jewish religions".

== Description ==
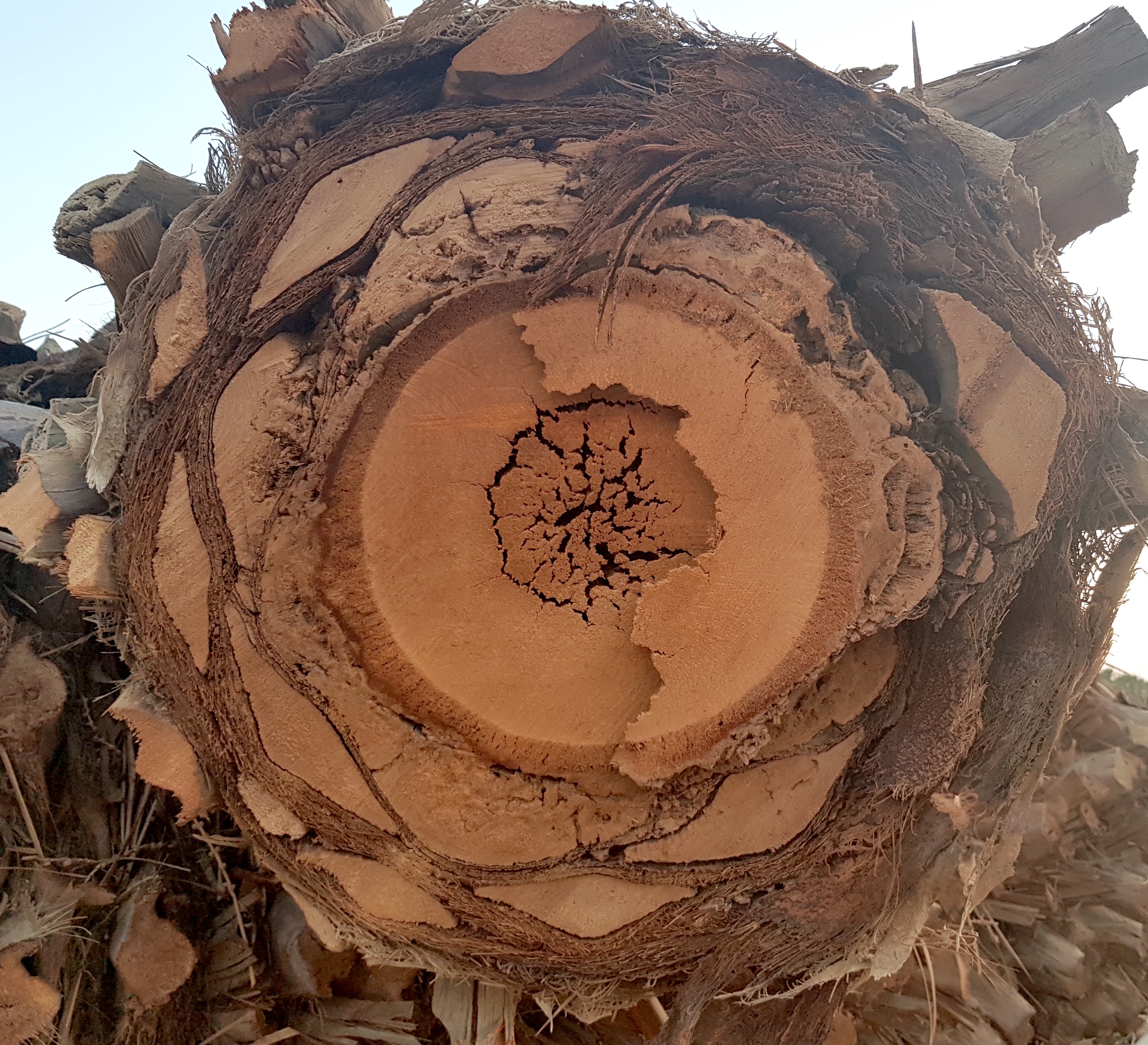
Phoenix dactylifera trunk section. As with other members of the palm family, date palms do not produce annual tree rings.

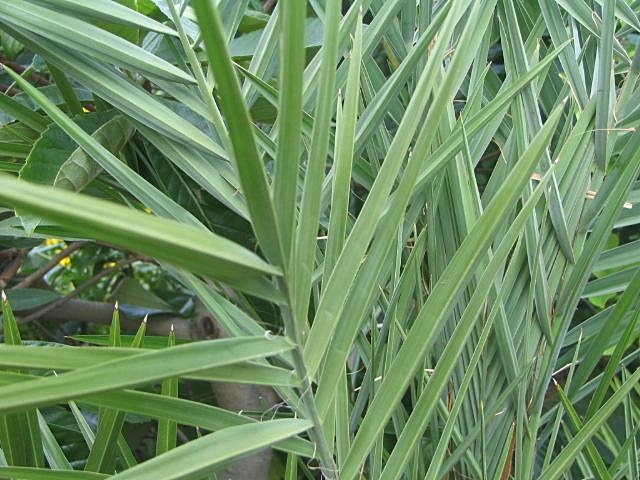
Leaves of the date palm

Date palms reach up to 30 metres (100 feet) in height, growing singly or forming a clump with several stems from a single root system. Date palms grow from average temperature range of 12.7 to 27.5 °C and are slow-growing. They can reach over 100 years of age when maintained properly. The roots have pneumatodes. The leaves are 4–6 m (13–20 ft) long, with spines on the petiole, and pinnate, with about 150 leaflets. The leaflets are 30 centimetres (12 inches) long and 2 cm (1 in) wide. The full span of the crown ranges from 6–10 m (20–33 ft).

The date palm is dioecious, having separate male and female plants. Like all members of genus Phoenix, sex determination occurs through an XY sex-determination system, where three genes that are conserved in all males and absent in all females have been identified. They can be easily grown from seed, but only 50% of seedlings will be female and hence fruit-bearing, and dates from seedling plants are often smaller and of poorer quality. Most commercial plantations thus use cuttings of heavily cropping cultivars. Plants grown from cuttings will fruit 2–3 years earlier than seedling plants.

Dates are naturally wind-pollinated, but in traditional oasis horticulture and modern commercial orchards, they are entirely hand-pollinated. Natural pollination occurs with about an equal number of male and female plants. With assistance, one male can pollinate up to 100 females. Since the males are of value only as pollinators, they are usually pruned in favor of fruit-producing female plants. Some growers do not maintain male plants, as male flowers become available at local markets at pollination time. Manual pollination is done by skilled labourers on ladders, or by use of a wind machine. In some areas, such as Iraq, the pollinator climbs the tree using a special climbing tool that wraps around the tree trunk and the climber's back (called تبلية in Arabic) to keep him attached to the trunk while climbing.

Date fruit are oval-cylindrical, 3–7 cm (1–3 in) long, and 2–3 cm (3/4–1 1/4 in) diameter, and when ripe, range from bright red to bright yellow in colour, depending on variety. Dates contain a single stone (seed) about 2–2.5 cm (3/4–1 in) long and 6–8 mm (1/4–5/16 in) thick. Three main cultivar groups exist: soft (e.g., Medjool); semi-dry (e.g., Deglet Nour), and dry (e.g., Thoory).

=== Genome ===
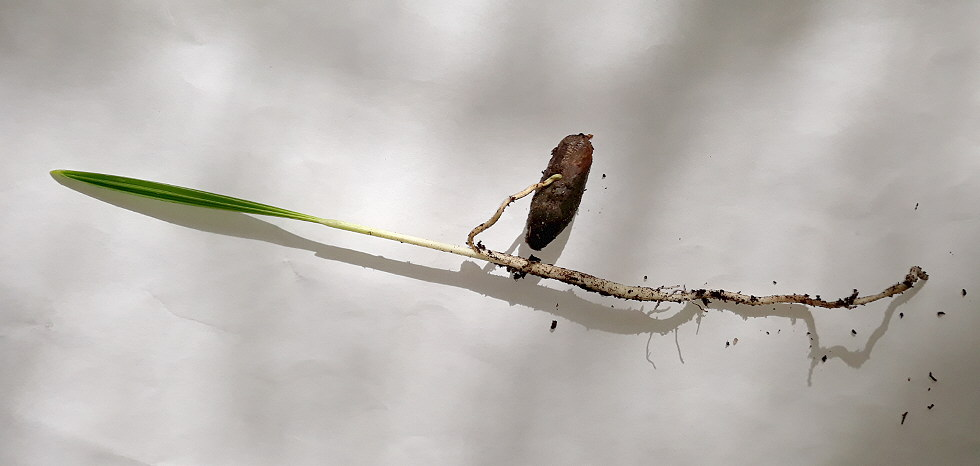
Germination of date palm

A draft genome of P. dactylifera (Khalas variety) was published in 2011 followed by more complete genome assemblies in 2013 and 2019. The later study used long-read sequencing technology. With the release of this improved genome assembly, the researchers were able to map genes for fruit color and sugar content. Researchers had also re-sequenced the genomes of several date varieties to develop the first single nucleotide polymorphism map of the date palm genome in 2015.

== Etymology ==
The species name dactylifera 'date-bearing' is Latin, and is formed with the loanword dactylus in Latin from Greek δάκτυλος daktylos, which means 'date' (also 'finger'), and with the native Latin fero, which means 'to bear'. The fruit's English name (through Old French, through Latin) comes from the aforementioned Greek word for 'finger' while itself cognate with the English word toe. An earlier word attested in Old English manuscripts was the calque fingerapple (Old English: fingeræppel).

The variety Phoenix dactylifera var. jubae, now considered a synonym for P. canariensis, was named after King Juba II.

== Distribution ==
The place and timeline of origin of the date palm is uncertain because of long cultivation. According to some sources it probably originated from the Fertile Crescent region straddling Egypt and Mesopotamia while others state that they are native to the Persian Gulf area or derived from wild date palm from western India. Fossil records show that the date palm has existed for at least 50 million years.

== Ecology ==
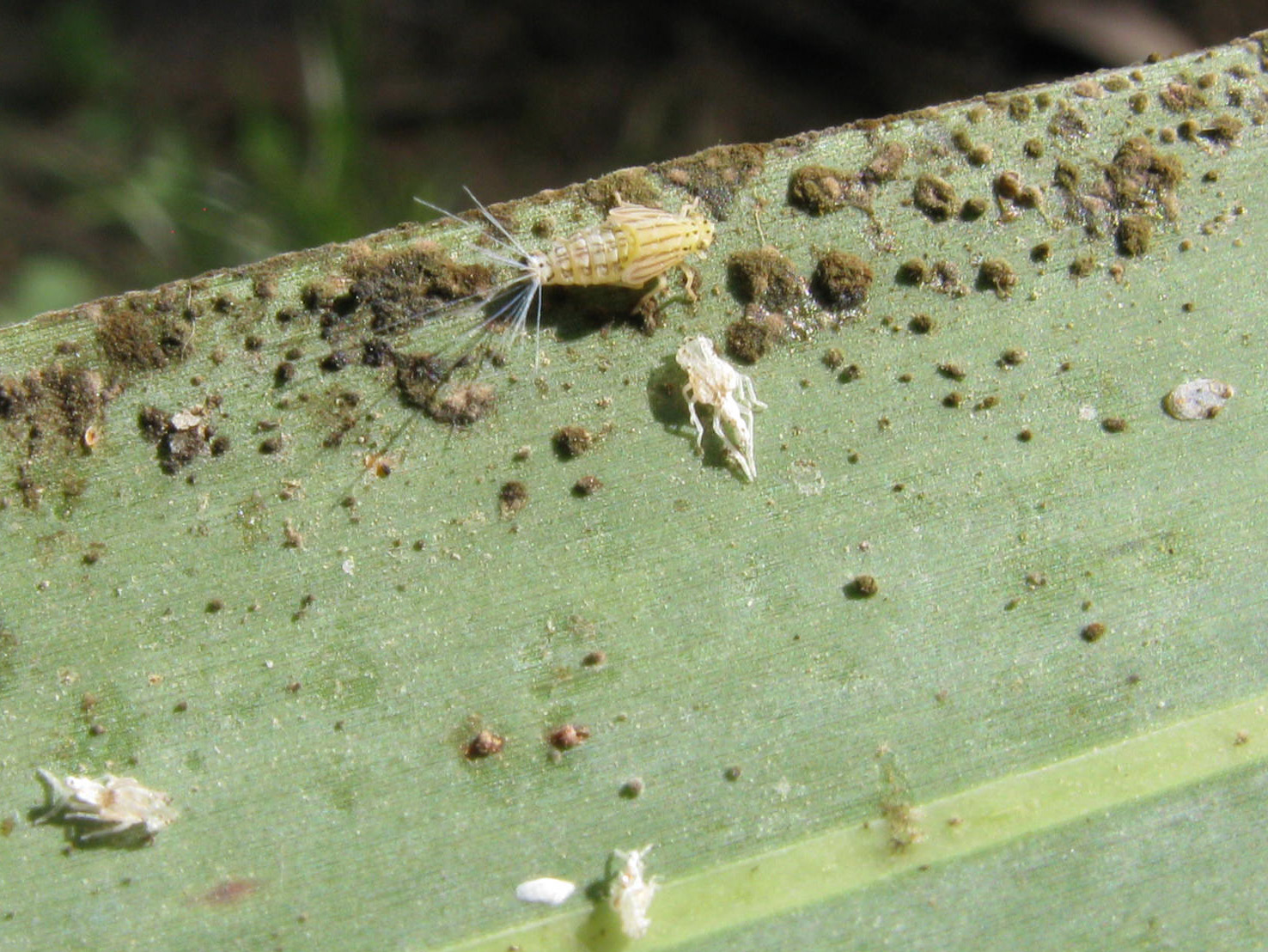
Sooty mould, nymph and larval cuticle of Ommatissus lybicus, Oman

A major palm pest, the red palm beetle (Rhynchophorus ferrugineus), currently poses a significant threat to date production in parts of the Middle East as well as to iconic landscape specimens throughout the Mediterranean world. Another significant insect pest is Ommatissus lybicus, sometimes called the "dubas bug", whose sap sucking results in sooty mould formation.

In the 1920s, eleven healthy Medjool palms were transferred from Morocco to the United States where they were tended by members of the Chemehuevi tribe in a remote region of Nevada. Nine of these survived and in 1935, cultivars were transferred to the U.S. Date Garden in Indio, California. Eventually this stock was reintroduced to Africa and led to the U.S. production of dates in Yuma, Arizona, and Bard, California.

== Cultivation ==
Dates are a traditional crop throughout the Middle East and North Africa. Dates (especially Medjool and Deglet Nour) are also cultivated in the southwestern United States, and in Sonora and Baja California in Mexico.

Date palms can take 4 to 8 years after planting before they will bear fruit, and start producing viable yields for commercial harvest between 7 and 10 years. Mature date palms can produce 70–140 kilograms (150–300 pounds) of dates per harvest season. They do not all ripen at the same time so several harvests are required. To obtain fruit of marketable quality, the bunches of dates must be thinned and bagged or covered before ripening so that the remaining fruit grow larger and are protected from weather and animals, such as birds, that also like to eat them.

Date palms require well-drained deep sandy loam soils with a pH of 8–11 (alkaline). The soil should have the ability to hold moisture and also be free of calcium carbonate.

=== Agricultural history ===
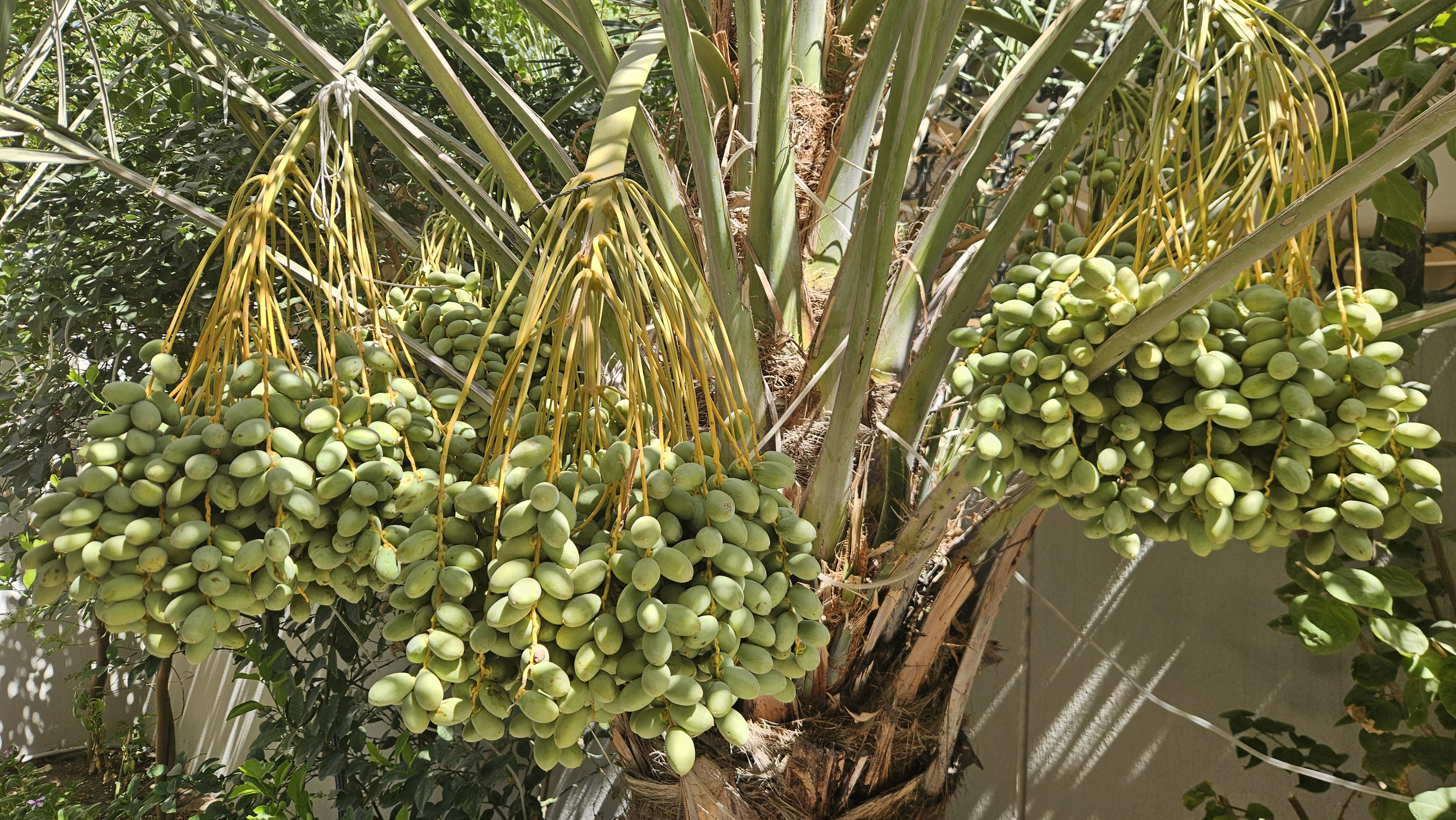
Unripe dates on a palm tree in Bahrain.

Dates have been cultivated in the Middle East and the Indus Valley for thousands of years, and there is archaeological evidence of date cultivation in Mehrgarh, a Neolithic civilisation in western Pakistan, around 7000 BCE and in eastern Arabia between 5530 and 5320 calBC. Dates have been cultivated since ancient times from Mesopotamia to prehistoric Egypt. The ancient Egyptians used the fruit to make date wine and ate dates at harvest. In the Levant, the earliest traces of dates appear during the Chalcolithic period, at sites such as Nahal Mishmar (Israel) and Teleilat el-Ghassul (Jordan). Evidence of cultivation is continually found throughout later civilisations in the Indus Valley, including the Harappan period from 2600 to 1900 BCE.

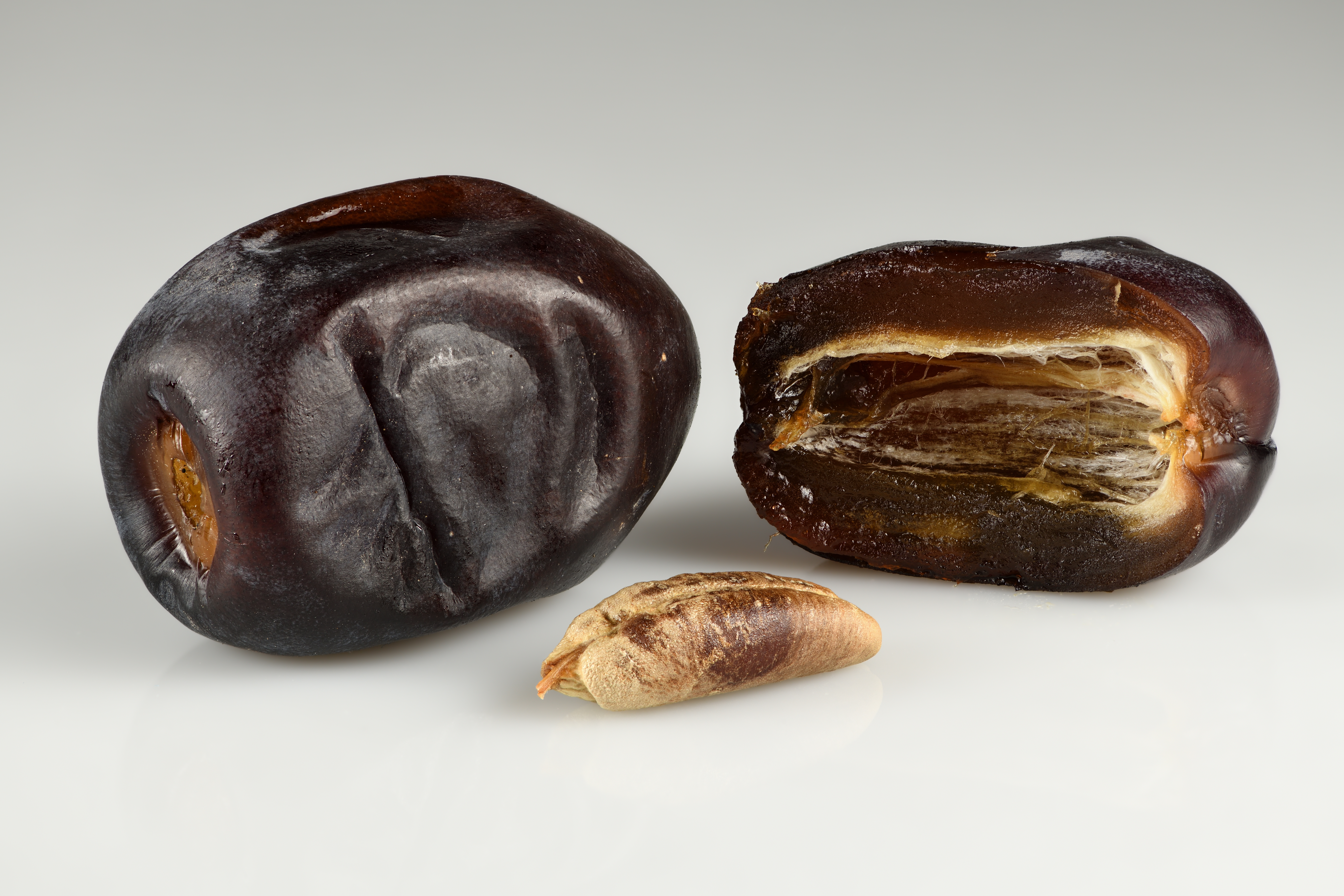
Mazafati dates

One cultivar, the Judean date palm, is renowned for its long-lived orthodox seed, which successfully sprouted after accidental storage for 2,000 years. In total seven seeds about 2000 years old have sprouted and turned into trees named Methuselah, Hannah, Adam, Judith, Boaz, Jonah and Uriel. The upper survival time limit of properly stored seeds remains unknown. A genomic study from New York University Abu Dhabi Center for Genomics and Systems Biology showed that domesticated date palm varieties from North Africa, including well-known varieties such as Medjool and Deglet Nour, share large parts of their genome with Middle East date palms and the Cretan wild palms, P. theophrasti, as well as Indian wild palms, Phoenix sylvestris.

An article on date palm tree cultivation is contained in Ibn al-'Awwam's 12th-century agricultural work, Book on Agriculture. In later times, traders spread dates around southwest Asia, northern Africa, and Spain. Dates were introduced into California by the Spaniards by 1769, existing by then around Mission San Diego de Alcalá, and were introduced to Mexico as early as the 16th century.

=== Cultivars ===
A large number of date cultivars and varieties emerged through history of its cultivation, but the exact number is difficult to assess. Hussain and El-Zeid (1975) have reported 400 varieties, while Nixon (1954) named around 250. Most of those are limited to a particular region, and only a few dozen have attained broader commercial importance. The most renowned cultivars worldwide include Deglet Noor, originally of Algeria; Yahidi and Hallawi of Iraq; Medjool of Morocco; Mazafati of Iran.

== Production ==
Dates production 2024, millions of tonnes
Saudi Arabia	1.9
Egypt	1.8
Algeria	1.3
Iran	1.2
Pakistan	0.7
Iraq	0.6
World	9.9
Source:UN Food and Agriculture Organization, Statistics Division

In 2024, world production of dates was 9.9 million tonnes, led by Saudi Arabia, Egypt, Algeria, and Iran, together accounting for 63% of the total (table).

Production of dates

Date yield

== Nutrition ==
Deglet noor dates
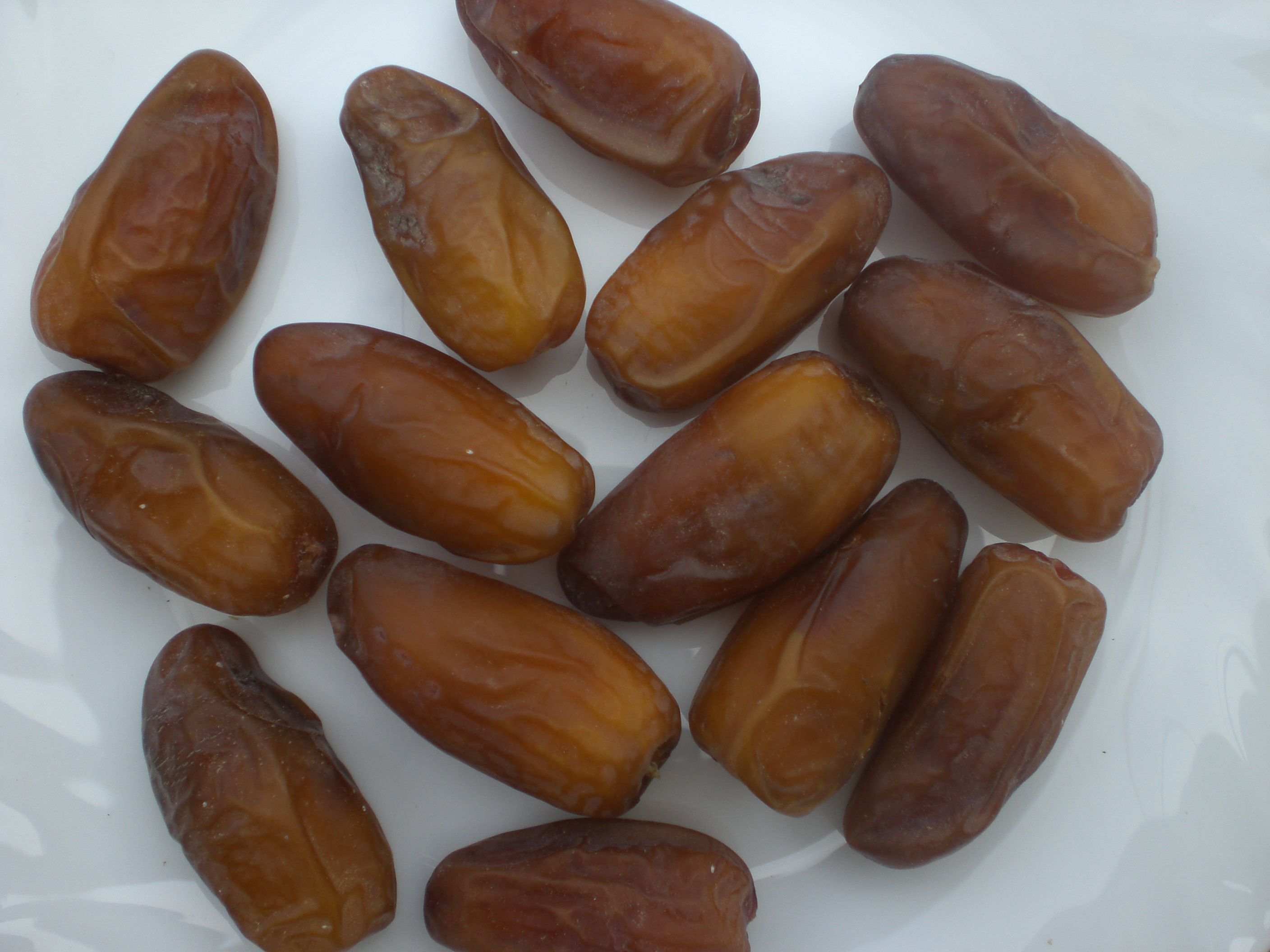

Nutritional value per 100 g (3.5 oz)
- Energy: 282 kcal (1,180 kJ)
- Carbohydrates: 75 g
- Sugars sucrose glucose fructose: 63 g 23.8 g 19.9 g 19.6 g
- Dietary fibre: 8 g
- Fat: 0.4 g
- Protein: 2.4 g
Vitamins and minerals
Vitamins	Quantity %DV^{†}
Vitamin A equiv. beta-Carotene lutein zeaxanthin	0% 6 μg 75 μg
Vitamin A	10 IU
Thiamine (B1)	4% 0.052 mg
Riboflavin (B2)	5% 0.066 mg
Niacin (B3)	8% 1.274 mg
Pantothenic acid (B5)	12% 0.589 mg
Vitamin B6	10% 0.165 mg
Folate (B9)	5% 19 μg
Vitamin C	0% 0.4 mg
Vitamin E	0% 0.05 mg
Vitamin K	2% 2.7 μg
Minerals	Quantity %DV^{†}
Calcium	3% 39 mg
Iron	6% 1.02 mg
Magnesium	10% 43 mg
Manganese	11% 0.262 mg
Phosphorus	5% 62 mg
Potassium	22% 656 mg
Sodium	0% 2 mg
Zinc	3% 0.29 mg
- Other constituents: Quantity
- Water: 20.5 g
- Link to USDA Database entry
- ^{†}Percentages estimated using US recommendations for adults, except for potassium, which is estimated based on expert recommendation from the National Academies.

Deglet noor dates are 21% water, 75% carbohydrates (63% sugars and 8% dietary fibre), 2% protein, and less than 1% fat (table). In a reference amount of 100 grams (3.5 oz), dates supply 1,180 kilojoules (280 kilocalories) of food energy, and are a rich source (20% or more of the Daily Value, DV) of potassium (22% DV) and a moderate source of pantothenic acid, vitamin B_{6}, and the dietary minerals magnesium and manganese (10–19% DV), with other micronutrients in low amounts (table). The primary carbohydrates are monosaccharides – glucose (20%), fructose (20%), and sucrose (24%) (table).

The glycemic index (GI) for different varieties of date palm fruit is in the range of 38–71, with 53 on average, indicating dates are a relatively low GI food source.

== Uses ==
=== Fruit ===
Dry or soft dates are eaten in-the-hand, or may be stoned and stuffed with fillings such as almonds, walnuts, pecans, candied orange and lemon peel, tahini, marzipan or cream cheese. Stoned dates are also referred to as pitted dates. Partially dried stoned dates may be glazed with glucose syrup for use as a snack food. Dates can also be chopped and used in a range of sweet and savory dishes, from tajines (tagines) in Morocco to puddings, ka'ak (types of Arab cookies) and other dessert items. Date nut bread, a type of cake, is very popular in the United States, especially around holidays. Dates are also processed into cubes, paste called 'ajwa, spread, date syrup or "honey" called "dibs" or rub in Libya, powder (date sugar), vinegar or alcohol. Vinegar made from dates was a traditional product of the Middle East. Recent innovations include chocolate-covered dates and products such as sparkling date juice, used in some Islamic countries as a non-alcoholic version of champagne, for special occasions and religious times such as Ramadan. When Muslims break fast in the evening meal of Ramadan, it is traditional to eat a date first.

Imported chopped dates are added to, or form the main basis of, a variety of traditional English dessert recipes including sticky toffee pudding and Christmas pudding. They are particularly available to eat whole at Christmas time. Dates are one of the ingredients of HP Sauce, a popular English condiment.

In Southeast Spain (where a large date plantation exists including UNESCO-protected Palmeral of Elche) dates (usually stoned with fried almond) are served wrapped in bacon and shallow-fried. In Israel date syrup, termed silan, is used while cooking chicken and also for sweets and desserts, and as a honey substitute. Dates are one of the ingredients of jallab, a Middle Eastern fruit syrup. In Pakistan, a viscous, thick syrup made from the ripe fruit is used as a coating for leather bags and pipes to prevent leaking.

==== Forks ====
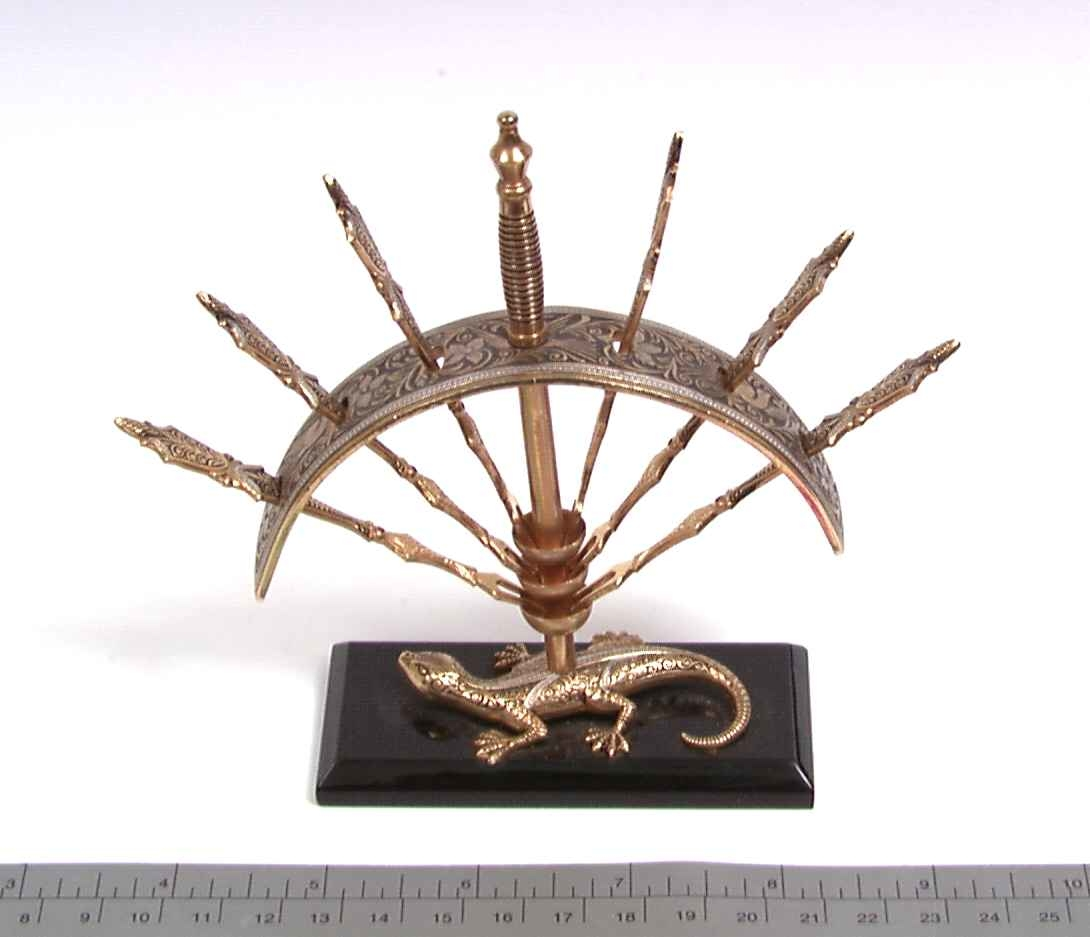
Antique date forks in rack

In the past, sticky dates were served using specialised small forks having two metal tines, called daddelgaffel in Scandinavia. Some designs were patented. These have generally been replaced by an inexpensive pale-colored knobbled plastic fork that resembles a date branch, which is traditionally included with numerous brands of prepackaged trays of dates, though this practice has declined in response to increased use of resealable packaging and calls for fewer single-use plastics.

=== Seeds ===
Date palm seeds contain 0.56–5.4% lauric acid and can also be processed chemically as a source of oxalic acid. Their oil, which contains lauric acid (36%) and oleic acid (41%), is suitable to be used in cosmetics and dermatological applications. The seeds can be soaked and ground up for animal feed. They can also be ground and used in the manner of coffee beans, or as an additive to coffee. Experimental studies have shown that feeding mice with the aqueous extract of date seeds exhibit anti-genotoxic effects and reduce DNA damage induced by N-nitroso-N-methylurea.

=== Fruit clusters ===
Stripped fruit clusters are used as brooms. Recently, the floral stalks have been found to be of ornamental value in households.

=== Sap ===
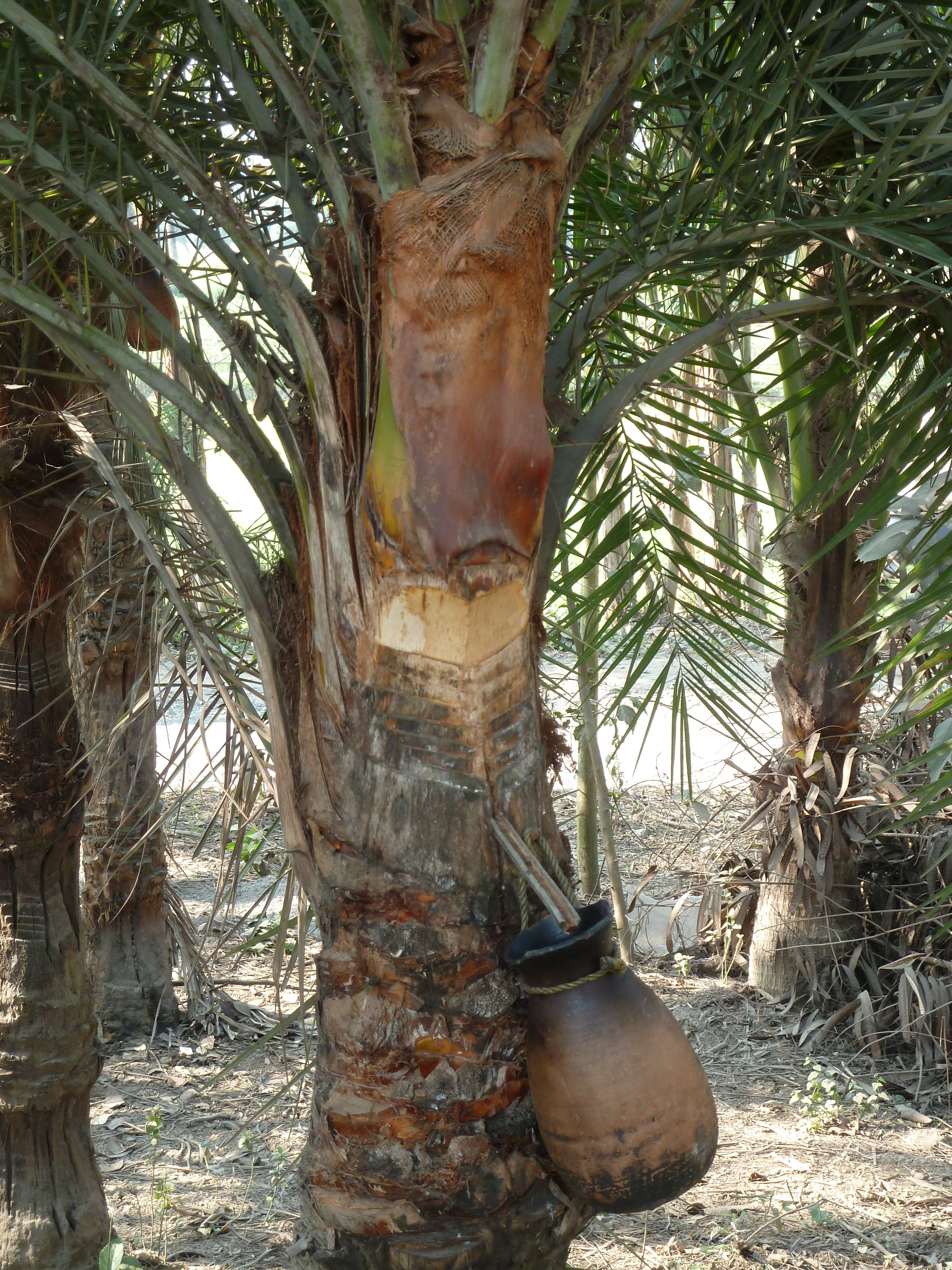
Sweet sap tapped from date palm in West Bengal, India

Apart from P. dactylifera, wild date palms such as Phoenix sylvestris and Phoenix reclinata, depending on the region, can be also tapped for sap.

The consumption of raw date palm sap is one of the means by which the deadly Nipah virus spreads from bats to humans. The virus can be inactivated by boiling the sap down to molasses.

=== Leaves ===
In North Africa, date palm leaves are commonly used for making huts. Mature leaves are also made into mats, screens, baskets, and fans. Processed leaves can be used for insulating board. Dried leaf petioles are a source of cellulose pulp, used for walking sticks, brooms, fishing floats, and fuel. Leaf sheaths are prized for their scent, and fibre from them is also used for rope, coarse cloth, and large hats.

Young date leaves are cooked and eaten as a vegetable, as is the terminal bud or heart, though its removal kills the palm. The finely ground seeds are mixed with flour to make bread in times of scarcity. The flowers of the date palm are also edible. Traditionally the female flowers are the most available for sale and weigh 300–400 grams (10 1/2–14 oz). The flower buds are used in salad or ground with dried fish to make a condiment for bread.

== In culture ==
Dates are mentioned more than 50 times in the Bible and 20 times in the Quran. Date palms holds great significance in Abrahamic religions. The tree was heavily cultivated as a food source in ancient Israel where Judaism and subsequently Christianity developed. Date palm leaves are used for Palm Sunday in the Christian religion.

=== Ancient Rome ===
In Ancient Rome, the palm fronds used in triumphal processions to symbolise victory were most likely those of P. dactylifera. The date palm was a popular garden plant in Roman peristyle gardens, though it would not bear fruit in the more temperate climate of Italy. It is recognisable in frescoes from Pompeii and elsewhere in Italy, including a garden scene from the House of the Wedding of Alexander.

=== Ancient Israel and Judaism ===
The date palm is one of the "Seven Species" (shivat haminim) traditionally associated with the Land of Israel and revered in Jewish tradition. The date palm has historically been considered a symbol of Judea and the Jewish people.

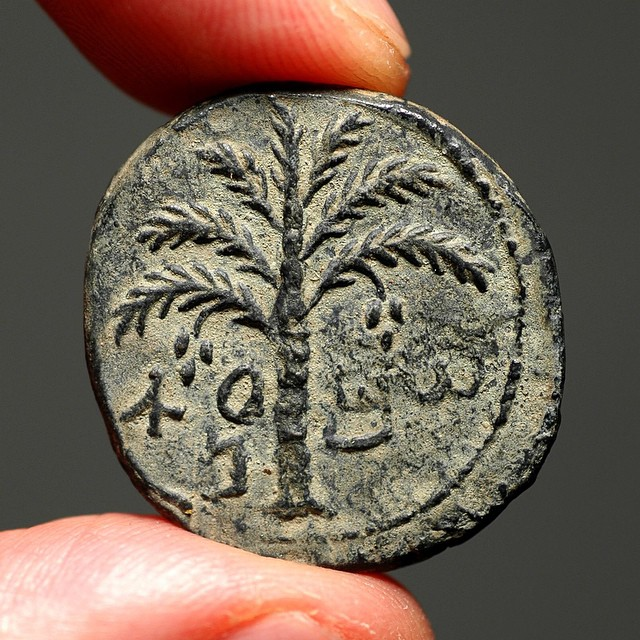
2nd-century Jewish coin minted in Judea, featuring a palm tree motif

The date palm is featured prominently in the Hebrew Bible. Scholars interpret the "honey" mentioned in Exodus 3, describing the Promised Land as "flowing with milk and honey", as a reference not to bee honey but to date syrup. Palm trees or their parts are mentioned in the Torah in connection with locations such as Elim, Jericho ("the city of palm trees"), and at Deborah's place of judgment in Judges. They are also listed among the agricultural blessings of the land (Joel 1:12), and their imagery is employed in biblical poetry to symbolise moral uprightness and stature, including in Psalm 92:12: "The righteous shall flourish like the palm tree", and in Song of Songs 7:8, where physical beauty is compared to the tree's form. According to the Bible, carved palm motifs decorated Solomon's Temple (1 Kings 6:29, 32, 35) and were part of the prophetic vision of the restored temple in Ezekiel (Ezek. 41:18–20). Outside of biblical texts, palm designs appear in the stone capitals and pilasters at several ancient Israelite sites, including Hazor, Megiddo, Samaria, Dan, and Ramat Rahel.

The palm tree became a broader emblem of Judea and its people, appearing on Jewish coinage and temple decorations. Palm branches occurred as iconography in sculpture ornamenting the Second Jewish Temple in Jerusalem, on Jewish coins, and in the sculpture of synagogues. In the Jewish festival of Sukkot (Feast of Tabernacles), date palm leaves serve two important functions. The lulav, a closed frond of the date palm, is one of the Four Species waved during prayers as part of the ritual observance. Palm leaves are also commonly used as s'chach, the natural roofing material placed atop the temporary outdoor hut known as a sukkah.

=== Islam ===
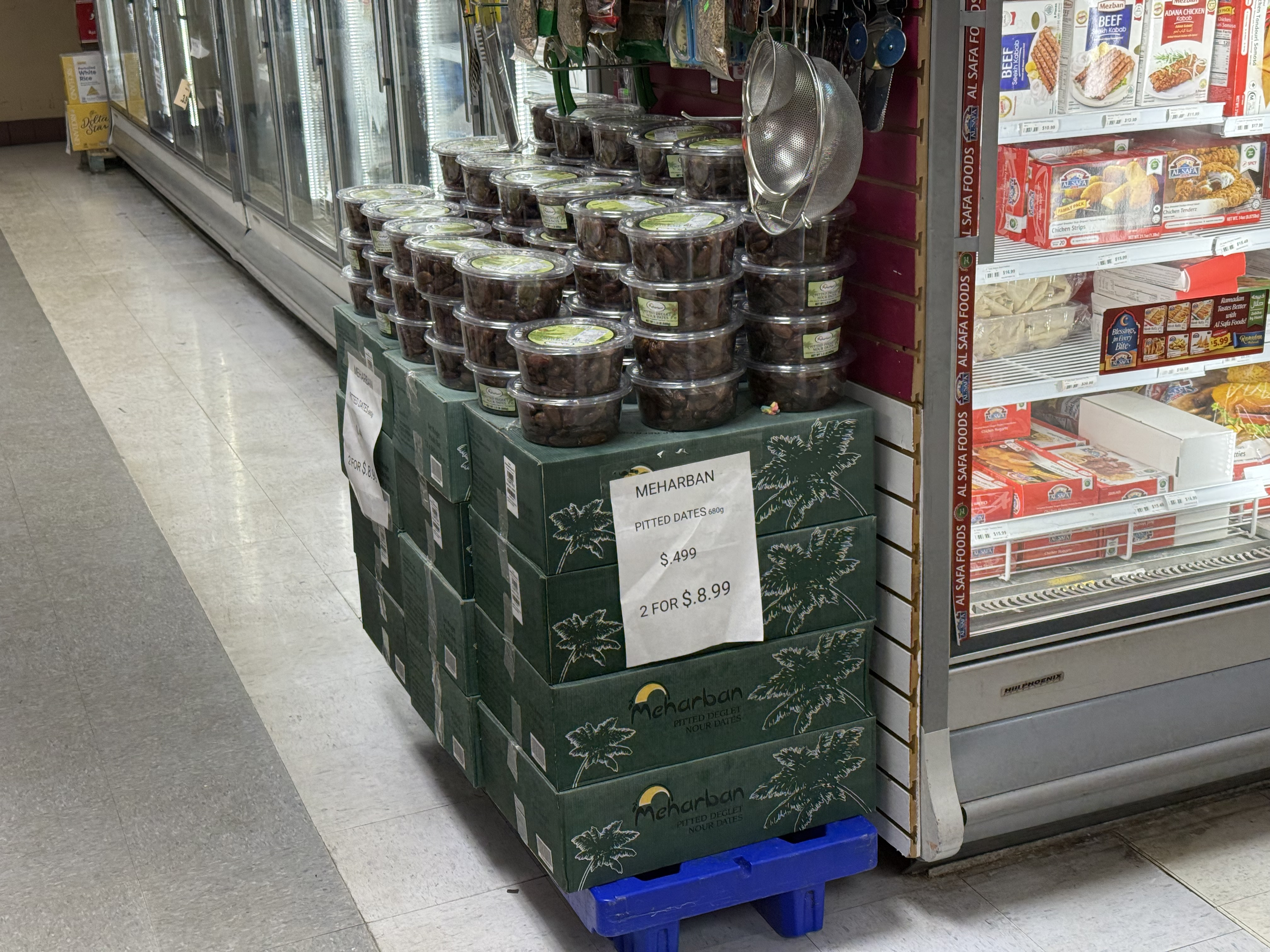
Meharban dates for sale at a store in preparation for Ramadan

In the Quran, Allah instructs Maryām (the Virgin Mary) to eat dates during labour pains when she gives birth to Isa (Jesus). In Islamic culture, dates and yogurt or milk are traditionally the first foods consumed for Iftar after the sun has set during Ramadan.

=== Mandaeism ===
In Mandaeism, the date palm (Mandaic: sindirka, which can refer to both the tree and its fruit) symbolises the cosmic tree and is often associated with the cosmic wellspring (Mandaic: aina). The date palm, associated with masculinity, and wellspring, associated with femininity, are often mentioned together as heavenly symbols in Mandaean texts.

== Gallery ==
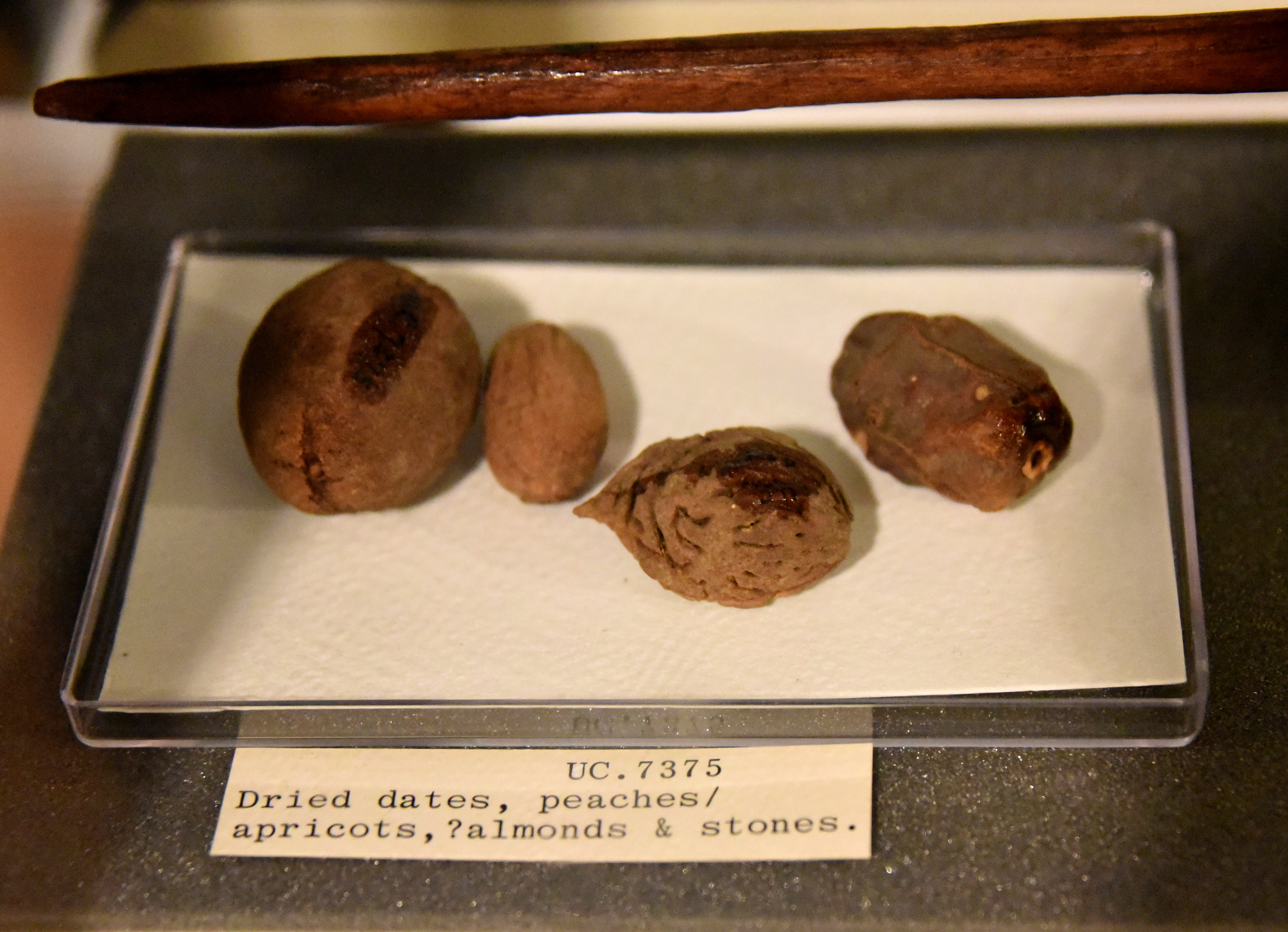
Dried date, peach, and apricot from Lahun, Fayum, Egypt. Late Middle Kingdom

Date palm in the emblem of Saudi Arabia

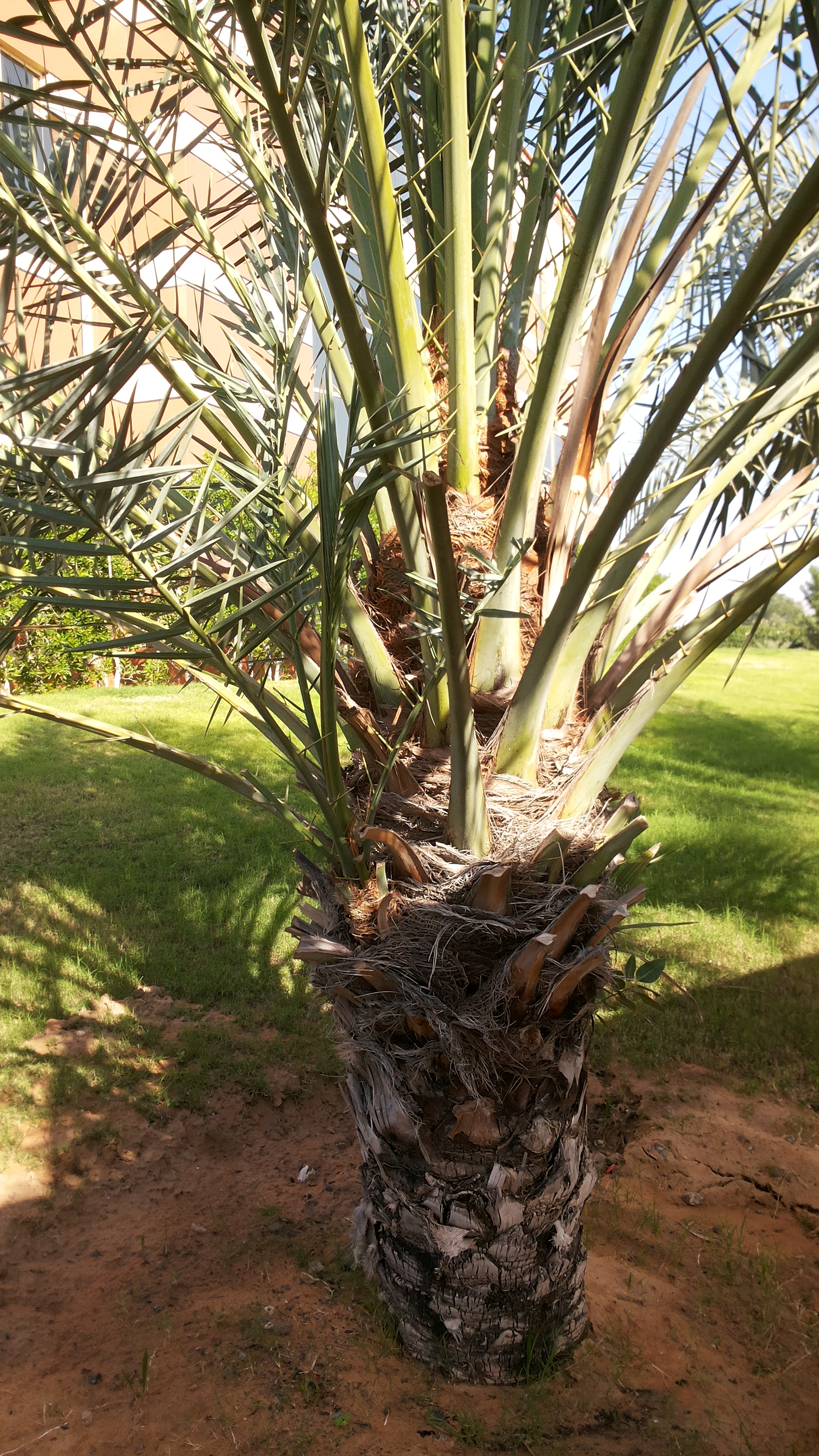
Date palm cutting growing on the trunk

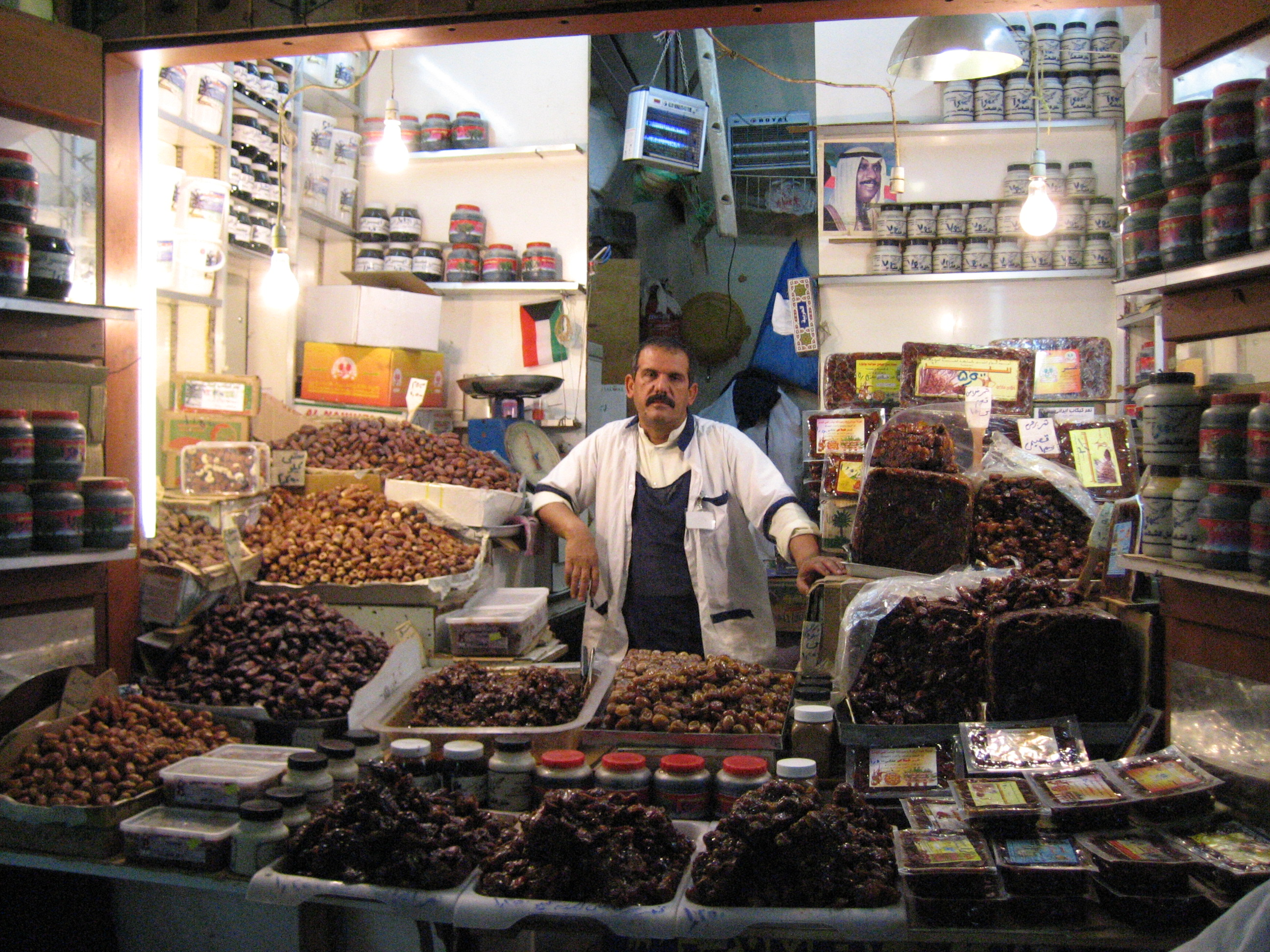
Date seller in the old souq in Kuwait City

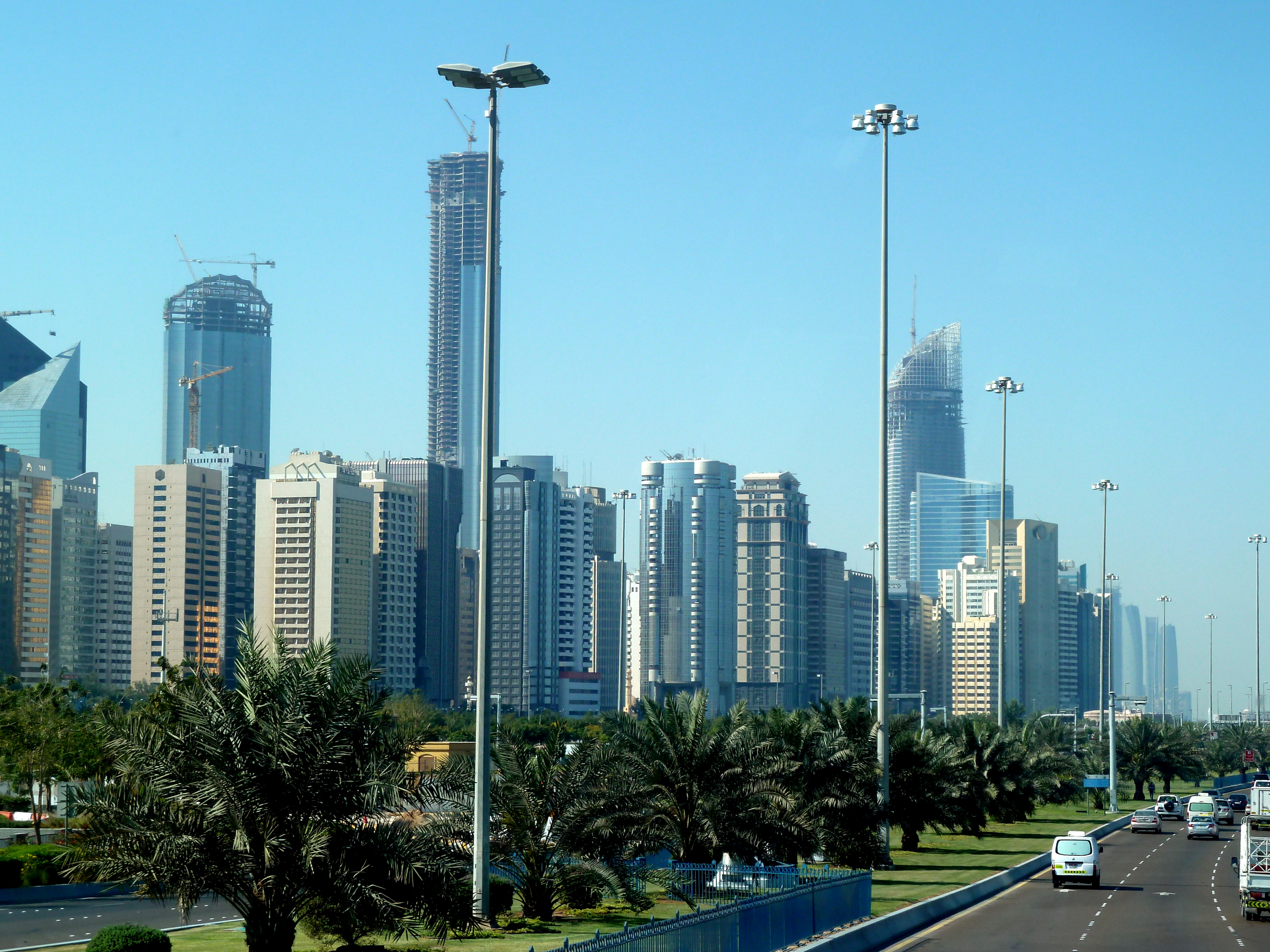
Palm trees and other trees in the road median in Abu Dhabi

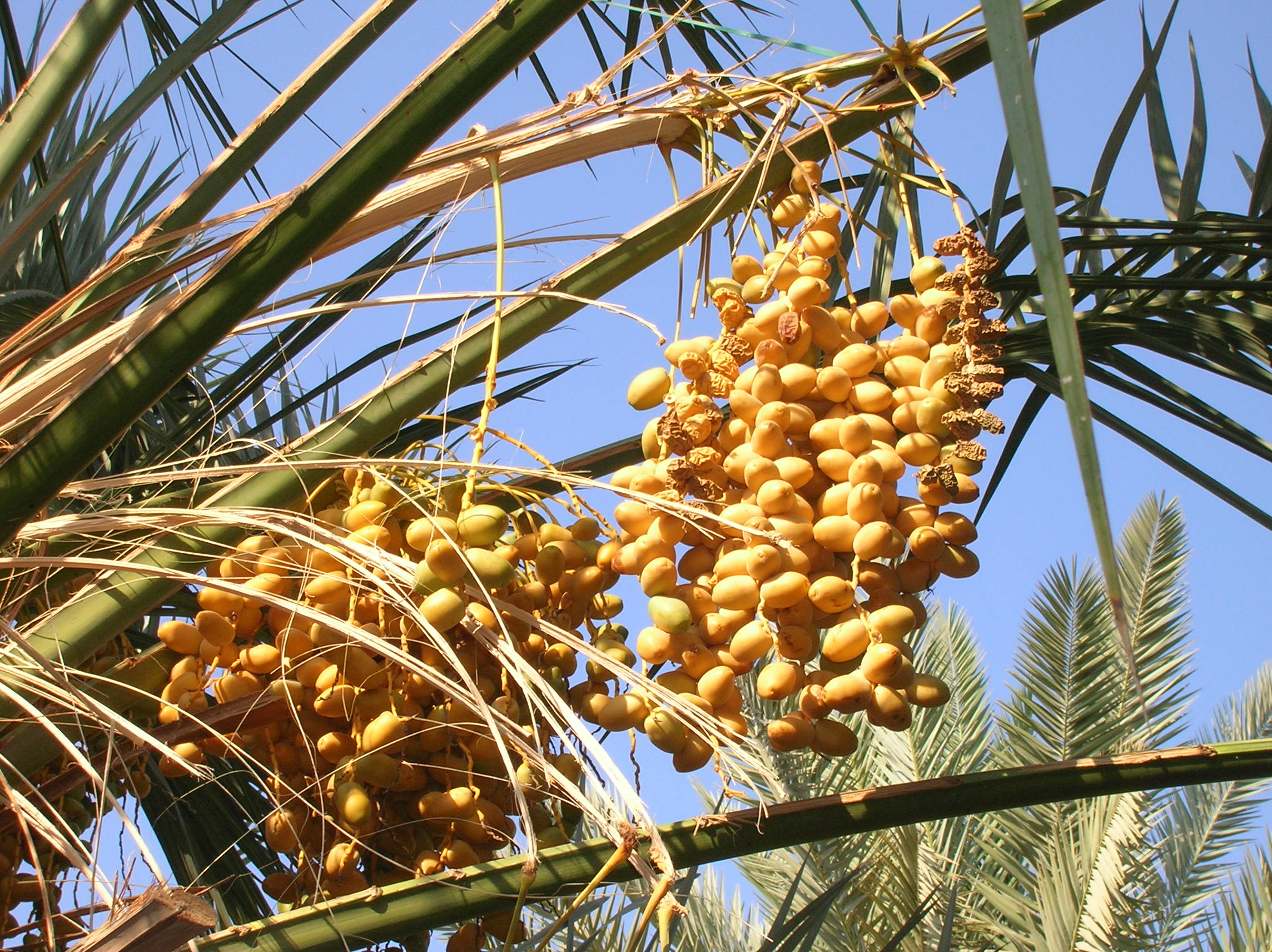
Fresh and dried dates on a date palm tree
