= The Amazing Race 1 =

Season of television series

- Season 1
- Region 1 DVD cover
- Presented by: Phil Keoghan
- No. of teams: 11
- Winners: Rob Frisbee and Brennan Swain
- No. of legs: 13
- Distance traveled: 35,000 mi (56,000 km)
- No. of episodes: 13

Release
- Original network: CBS
- Original release: September 5 – December 13, 2001

Additional information
- Filming dates: March 8 – April 8, 2001

Series chronology
- Next → Season 2

The Amazing Race 1 (originally broadcast under the name The Amazing Race) is the first season of the American reality competition series The Amazing Race. Hosted by Phil Keoghan, it featured eleven teams of two, each with a pre-existing relationship, competing in a race around the world. This season visited four continents and nine countries, traveling approximately 35,000 miles (56,000 km) over thirteen legs. Filming took place from March 8 to April 8, 2001. Starting in New York City, racers traveled through South Africa, Zambia, France, Tunisia, Italy, India, Thailand, and China, before returning to the United States, traveling through Alaska, and finishing in New York City. The season debuted on CBS on September 5, 2001, and concluded on December 13, 2001.

Lawyers and best friends Rob Frisbee and Brennan Swain were the winners, while separated parents Frank and Margarita Mesa finished in second place, and life partners Joe Baldassare and Bill Bartek finished in third place.

== Format ==
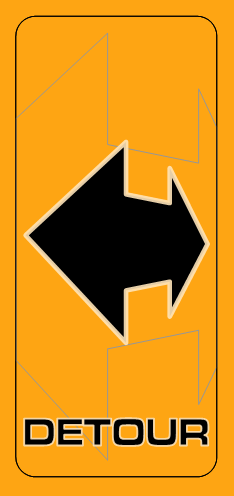
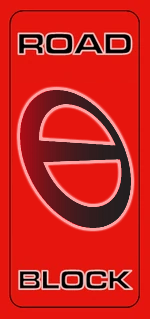
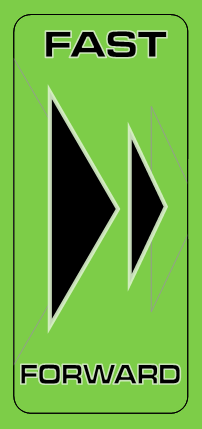
The clues which contestants receive during the course of the race generally fall into four categories: Route Info, Detour, Roadblock, and Fast Forward.

The Amazing Race is a reality television show created by Bertram van Munster and Elise Doganieri, and hosted by Phil Keoghan. The series follows teams of two competing in a race around the world. Each leg of the race requires teams to deduce clues, navigate foreign environments, interact with locals, perform physical and mental challenges, and travel on a limited budget provided by the show. At each stop during the leg, teams receive clues inside sealed envelopes, which fall into one of these categories:

- Route Info: These are simple instructions that teams must follow before they can receive their next clue.
- Detour: A Detour is a choice between two tasks. Teams may choose either task and switch tasks if they find one option too difficult. There is usually one Detour present on each leg.
- Roadblock: A Roadblock is a task that only one team member can complete. Teams must choose which member will complete the task based on a brief clue they receive before fully learning the details of the task. There is usually one Roadblock present on each leg.
- Fast Forward: A Fast Forward is a task that only one team may complete, which allows that team to skip all remaining tasks on the leg and go directly to the next Pit Stop. Teams may only claim one Fast Forward during the entire race.

Most teams who arrive last at the Pit Stop of each leg are progressively eliminated, while the first team to arrive at the finish line in the final episode wins the grand prize of US$1,000,000.

== Production ==
=== Development and filming ===
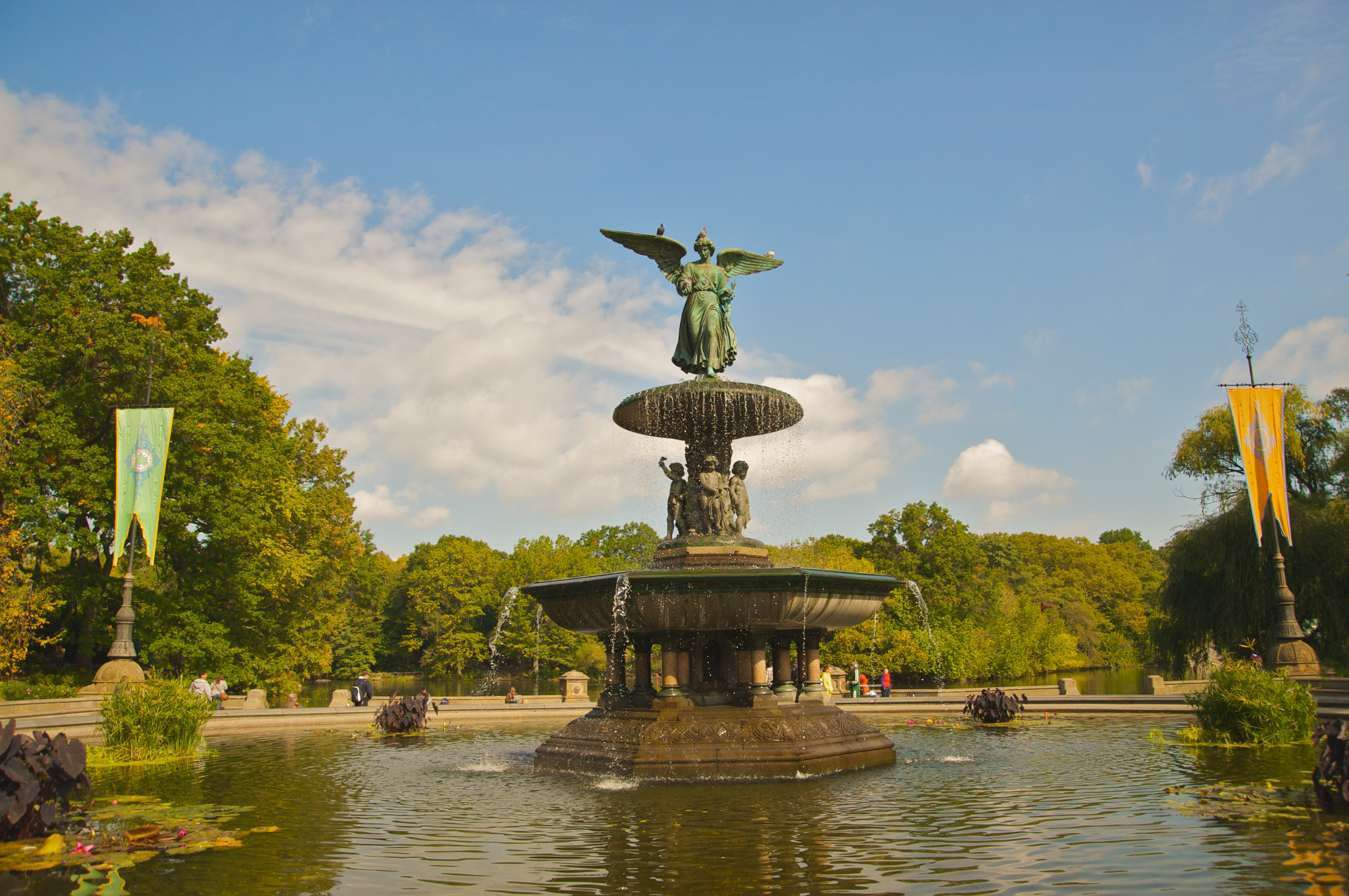
The Amazing Race began at Bethesda Fountain in New York City's Central Park.

On September 13, 2000, CBS announced that it was set to produce a new reality show, which would feature eight teams of two traveling to eleven international locations to win US$1 million. By December 2000, the show was under the working title of CBS Summer Global Adventure Series. Location scouting for the racecourse took place in January 2001. Filming for the first season began in March 2001 by which time the show had been renamed to The Amazing Race. The first season of The Amazing Race traveled 35,000 miles (56,000 km) in 39 days, spanning four continents and nine countries. The season was hit with multiple filming delays, including an airport strike in Rome and a sandstorm in Tunisia, the latter of which forced teams to begin the sixth leg in Gabès rather than the original Saharan desert Pit Stop. Filming concluded on April 8, 2001, at Flushing Meadows Park. The top of the World Trade Center was considered as the finish location for the season but was changed to Flushing Meadows Park after production was unable to secure needed permits.

Multiple aspects of filming were unique to the first season of the series. Host Phil Keoghan handed out clues at the beginning of some legs and only greeted the last-place team at each Pit Stop; all other teams were greeted and informed of their placements by local representatives. This changed in subsequent seasons; Keoghan informs all of the teams of their placements while accompanied by a local greeter in order to increase his involvement in the show and prevent him from appearing like a grim reaper. Each leg's Pit Stop mat featured a localized design, while subsequent seasons have used a single design. The teams were also not required to read their clues out loud on camera; this was made compulsory for all teams in subsequent seasons.

The Amazing Race was designed so that the final three teams would all reach the finish line. However, Joe and Bill were so far behind that they could not catch up and did not finish the competition. They were still completing leg 12 in Alaska while Rob and Brennan, and Frank and Margarita, were crossing the finish line in New York City.

== Contestants ==
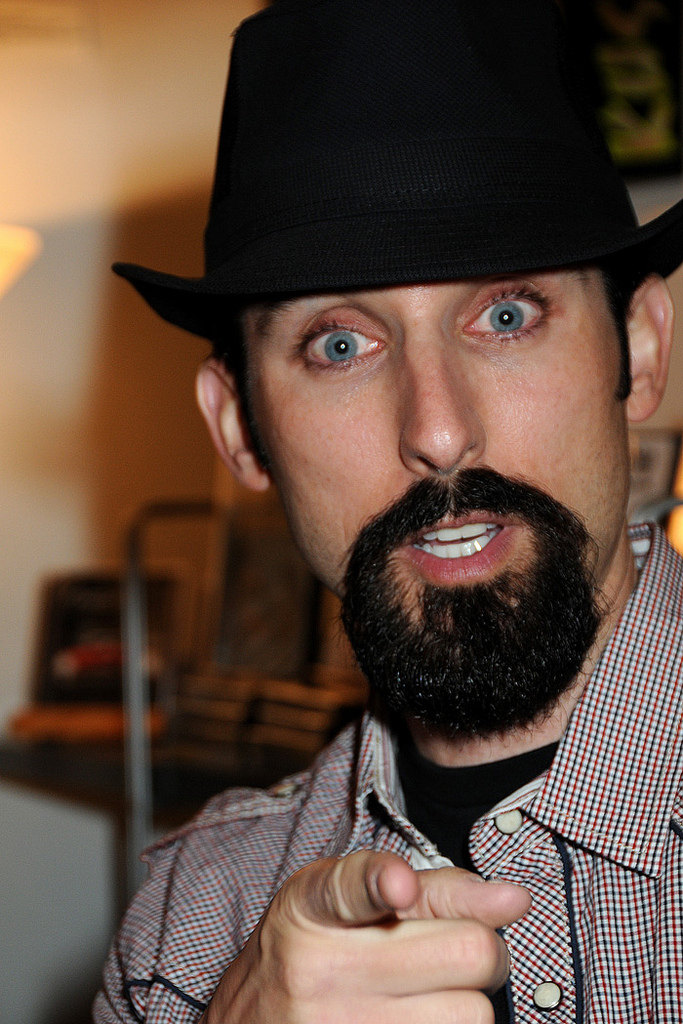
Paul Alessi

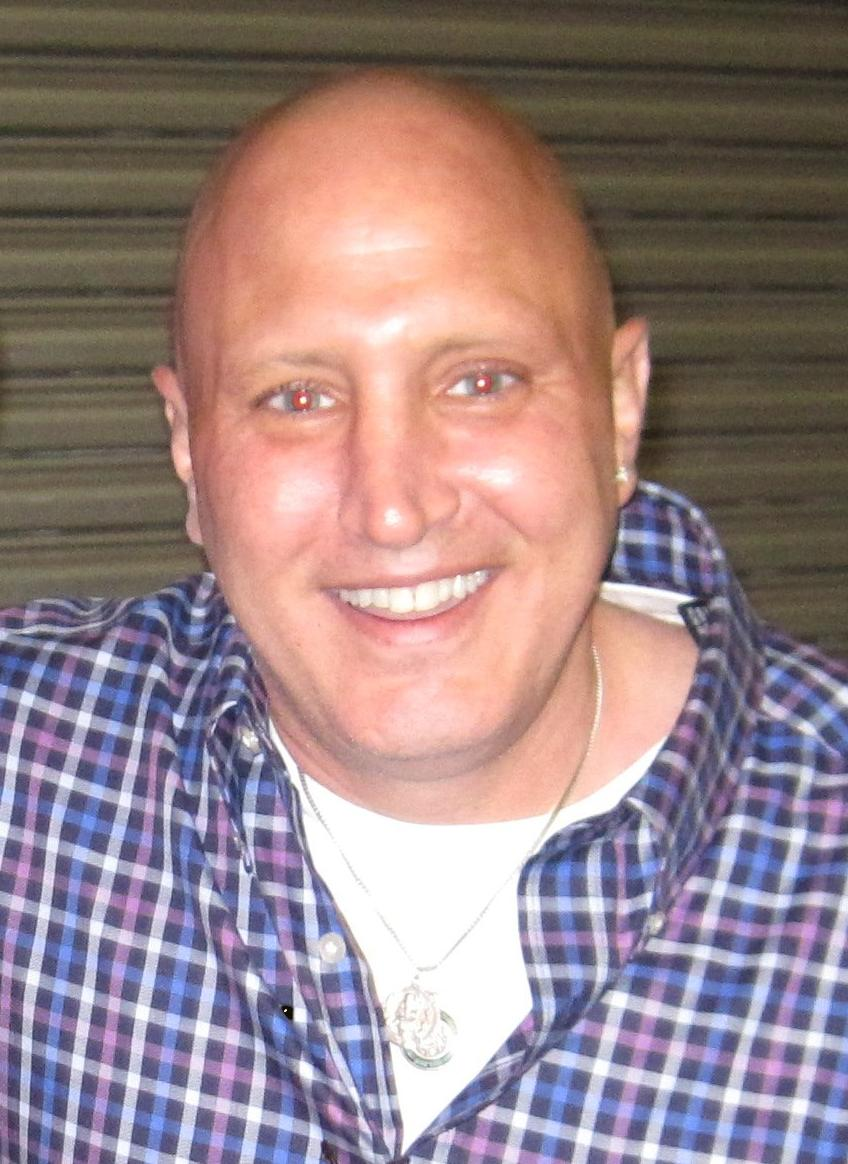
Drew Feinberg

Eleven teams participated in the first season of The Amazing Race.

| Contestants | Age | Relationship | Hometown | Status |
|---|---|---|---|---|
| Matt Robar | 28 | Married | Simsbury, Connecticut | Eliminated 1st (in Songwe Village, Zambia) |
| Ana Robar | 28 | Married | Simsbury, Connecticut | Eliminated 1st (in Songwe Village, Zambia) |
| Kim Smith | 28 | Teachers & Roommates | Baytown, Texas | Eliminated 2nd (in Paris, France) |
| Leslie Kellner | 27 | Teachers & Roommates | Baytown, Texas | Eliminated 2nd (in Paris, France) |
| Pat Pierce | 43 | Working Moms | Landenberg, Pennsylvania | Eliminated 3rd (in Les Baux-de-Provence, France) |
| Brenda Mehta | 42 | Working Moms | Elkton, Maryland | Eliminated 3rd (in Les Baux-de-Provence, France) |
| Dave Groark | 65 | Grandparents | Rockwall, Texas | Eliminated 4th (in El Djem, Tunisia) |
| Margaretta Groark | 60 | Grandparents | Rockwall, Texas | Eliminated 4th (in El Djem, Tunisia) |
| Paul Alessi | 32 | Engaged | Los Angeles, California | Eliminated 5th (in Jebil National Park, Tunisia) |
| Amie Barsky | 27 | Engaged | Los Angeles, California | Eliminated 5th (in Jebil National Park, Tunisia) |
| Lenny Hudson | 33 | Dating | New York City, New York | Eliminated 6th (in Agra, India) |
| Karyn Jefferson | 30 | Dating | New York City, New York | Eliminated 6th (in Agra, India) |
| Nancy Hoyt | 46 | Mother & Daughter | Waco, Texas | Eliminated 7th (in Krabi, Thailand) |
| Emily Hoyt | 21 | Mother & Daughter | Waco, Texas | Eliminated 7th (in Krabi, Thailand) |
| Kevin O'Connor | 34 | Fraternity Brothers | Bayonne, New Jersey | Eliminated 8th (in Beijing, China) |
| Drew Feinberg | 35 | Fraternity Brothers | Staten Island, New York | Eliminated 8th (in Beijing, China) |
| Joe Baldassare | 50 | Life Partners | Laguna Niguel, California | Third place |
| Bill Bartek | 47 | Life Partners | Laguna Niguel, California | Third place |
| Frank Mesa | 30 | Separated Parents | Queens, New York | Runners-up |
| Margarita Mesa | 28 | Separated Parents | Queens, New York | Runners-up |
| Rob Frisbee | 27 | Lawyers & Best Friends | Minneapolis, Minnesota | Winners |
| Brennan Swain | 29 | Lawyers & Best Friends | Rochester, New York | Winners |

Future appearances

Kevin and Drew made an appearance in The Amazing Race: Family Edition, handing out clues at a hot dog stand in New York City. Kevin and Drew and Joe and Bill, returned for the first All-Stars season. Frank Mesa made an appearance at the starting line of season 25. Rob and Brennan made an appearance at the starting line of season 27.

== Results ==
The following teams are listed with their placements at the end of each episode.

- A red placement with a dagger (†) indicates that the team was eliminated.
- An underlined blue placement with a double-dagger (‡) indicates that the team was the last to arrive at a Pit Stop in a non-elimination leg.
- A green ƒ indicates that the team won the Fast Forward.

Team placement (by episode)
| Team | 1 | 2 | 3 | 4 | 5 | 6 | 7 | 8 | 9 | 10 | 11 | 12 | 13 |
|---|---|---|---|---|---|---|---|---|---|---|---|---|---|
| Rob & Brennan | 1stƒ | 3rd | 3rd | 6th | 4th | 3rd | 3rd | 3rd | 1st | 1st | 2nd | 1st | 1st |
| Frank & Margarita | 3rd | 4th | 2nd | 5th | 5th | 1st | 1stƒ | 2nd | 2nd | 2nd | 1st | 2nd | 2nd |
| Joe & Bill | 2nd | 2nd | 4th | 1st | 2nd | 2nd | 2nd | 4th | 4thƒ | 4th‡ | 3rd | 3rd‡ | 3rd |
| Kevin & Drew | 9th | 5th | 1stƒ | 2nd | 1st | 4th | 4th | 1st | 3rd | 3rd | 4th† | | |
| Nancy & Emily | 10th | 7th | 8th | 3rd | 3rd | 5th | 5th | 5th‡ | 5th† (Note: Nancy and Emily initially arrived 4th, but they were issued a 24-hour penalty for failing to complete either Detour option and taking a taxi to the Roadblock. Joe and Bill checked in during this penalty time, dropping Nancy and Emily to last.) | | | | |
| Lenny & Karyn | 4th | 9th | 7th | 7th | 6th | 6th‡ | 6th† | | | | | | |
| Paul & Amie | 7th | 6th | 6th | 4th (Note: Paul and Amie checked in 5th at the end of this leg, but they departed the next leg 4th after being awarded a time credit.) | 7th† | | | | | | | | |
| Dave & Margaretta | 8th (Note: Dave and Margaretta initially arrived 7th, but they were penalized for not completing the Detour correctly. They departed the Pit Stop 8th.) | 8th (Note: Dave and Margaretta initially arrived 6th, but they were penalized for not completing the Roadblock correctly. They departed the Pit Stop 8th.) | 5th | 8th† | | | | | | | | | |
| Pat & Brenda | 5th | 1stƒ | 9th† | | | | | | | | | | |
| Kim & Leslie | 6th | 10th† | | | | | | | | | | | |
| Matt & Ana | 11th† | | | | | | | | | | | | |

== Race summary ==
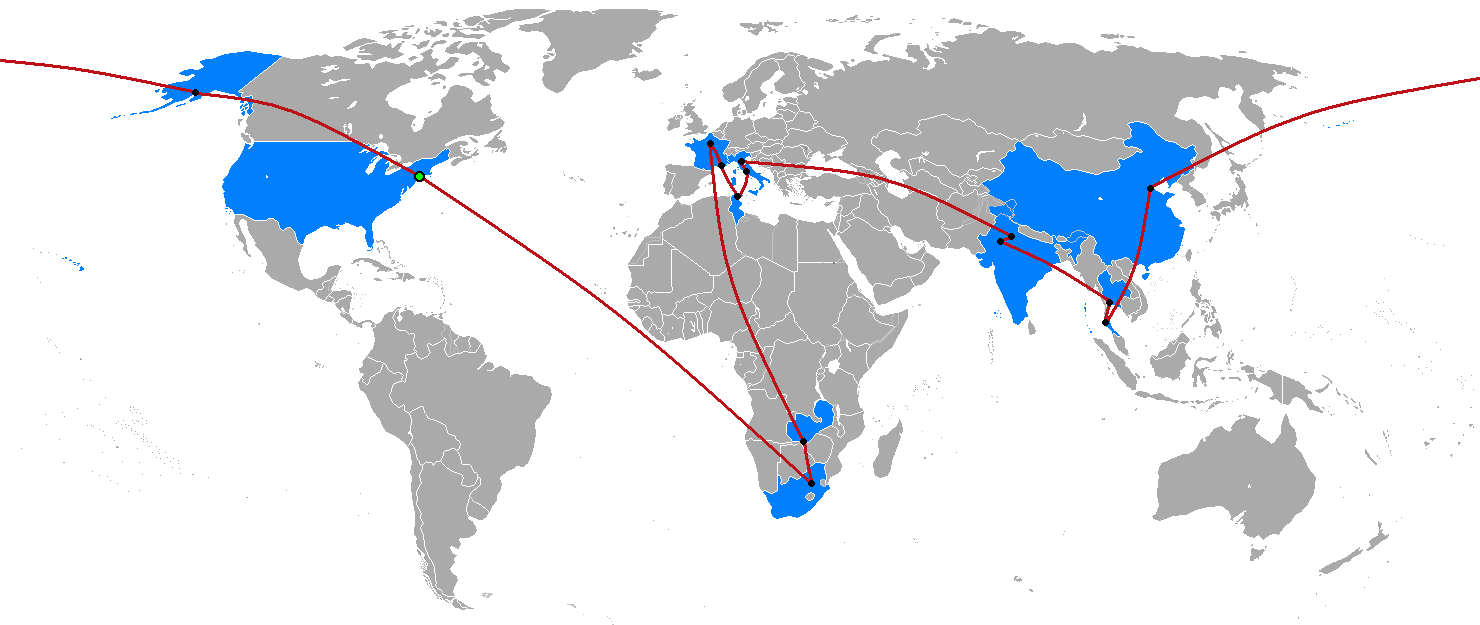
The route of The Amazing Race 1

| Destinations | Air travel Rail travel Water travel Bus travel Helicopter travel Bicycle travel Gondola travel |
| Route Markers | Detour Roadblock Fast Forward Pit Stop |

=== Leg 1 (United States → South Africa → Zambia) ===
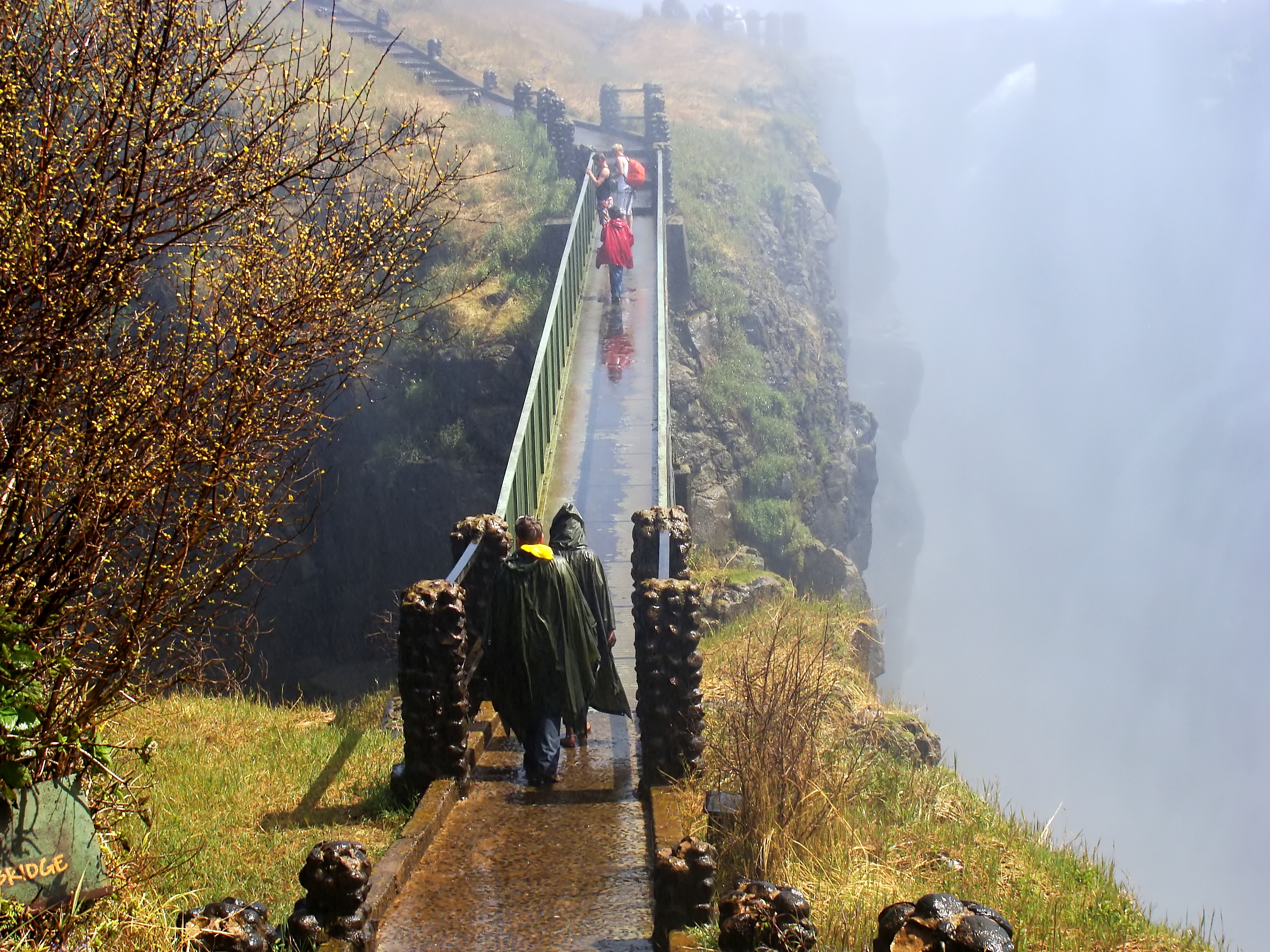
The Knife's Edge Bridge in the midst of Victoria Falls' inverted rain was the first location visited in The Amazing Race.

- Episode 1: "The Race Begins" (September 5, 2001)
- Eliminated: Matt and Ana

Locations

- New York City, New York (Central Park – Bethesda Fountain) (Starting Line)
- New York City → Johannesburg, South Africa (Johannesburg International Airport)
- Johannesburg → Livingstone, Zambia (Livingstone Airport)
- Mosi-oa-Tunya National Park (Victoria Falls – Knife's Edge Bridge)
- Mosi-oa-Tunya National Park (Victoria Falls – Boiling Pot)
- Livingstone District (Batoka Gorge – Abseil Zambia)
- Livingstone District (Songwe Village)

Episode summary

- Teams began the race from Central Park in New York City with instructions to fly on one of three flights to Johannesburg, South Africa. Once there, teams were directed to the Lanseria Airport, where they had to book one of four charter flights to an unknown destination (Livingstone, Zambia). Once there, teams had to locate a vehicle outside of the airport with instructions to find "the smoke that thunders," the local name for Victoria Falls. Teams could either drive themselves or hire a driver (who could not provide directions) to the falls, where they found their next clue.
- For the series' very first Fast Forward, one team had to hike down a canyon to the Boiling Pot on the Zambezi River. Rob and Brennan won the Fast Forward.
- Teams who did not attempt the Fast Forward had to travel to Abseil Zambia at Batoka Gorge and find their next clue.
- The series' very first Detour was a choice between Air or Land. In Air, teams had to ride a zipline across Batoka Gorge and then free-fall down on a gorge swing to their next clue. In Land, teams would have hiked down the rim of the gorge to their next clue. All teams chose Air.
- Teams had to check in at the Pit Stop: Songwe Village.

Additional notes

- Near Songwe Village, there was a Roadblock that required one team member to cook an ostrich egg, which both team members had to eat, before they could check in at the Pit Stop. This task was unaired, but it was shown as a bonus feature on the DVD.
- The gorge swing Detour at Batoka Gorge was revisited in season 27 as a Switchback in Zimbabwe.

=== Leg 2 (Zambia → South Africa → France) ===
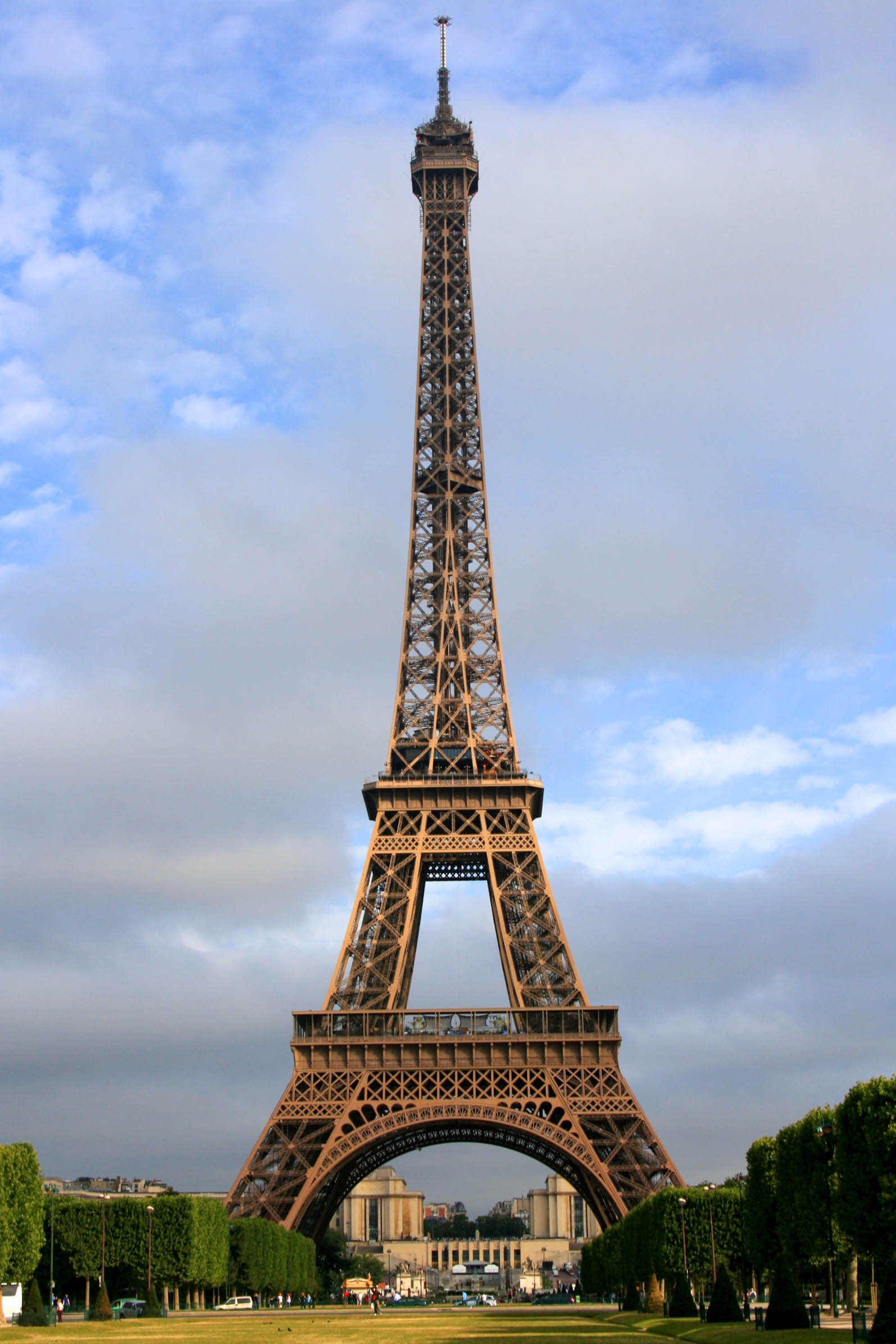
After arriving in Paris, teams visited the Eiffel Tower for the Roadblock.

Polaroid photo of contestants Rob and Brennan, along with Phil Keoghan and two members of the production crew, at the Arc de Triomphe in Paris. Contestants received Polaroid cameras at the beginning of leg 2 to photograph African animals.

- Episode 2: "Divide and Conquer" (September 19, 2001)
- Eliminated: Kim and Leslie

Locations

- Livingstone District (Songwe Village)
- Livingstone District (Songwe Museum)
- Livingstone (Bundu Adventures)
- Livingstone (Mosi-oa-Tunya National Park)
- Kazungula District (Mukuni Village)
- Livingstone → Johannesburg, South Africa
- Johannesburg → Paris, France
- Paris (Eiffel Tower)
- Paris (Arc de Triomphe)

Episode summary

- At the start of this leg, teams had to find the Songwe Museum located near the village, where they found instant cameras along with their next clue.
- For this leg's Fast Forward, one team had to whitewater raft down the Zambezi River. Pat and Brenda won the Fast Forward.
- This leg's Detour was a choice between Near or Far. In Near, teams had to go to Mosi-oa-Tunya National Park 20 kilometres (12 mi) away and photograph three hard-to-find animals from a list of five. In Far, teams would have had to go to Chobe National Park in Botswana 110 kilometres (68 mi) away and photograph a single elephant. All teams chose Near.
- After the Detour, teams had to travel to Mukuni Village, where they took part in a traditional welcome ceremony for honored guests. Teams then gave the village chief the photographs they took during the Detour in exchange for their next clue: a miniature model of the Eiffel Tower. Teams returned by charter flight to Johannesburg, South Africa, where they had to book flights to Paris, France. Once there, teams had to find their next clue beneath the Eiffel Tower.
- In this leg's Roadblock, one team member had to go by stairs to the second level of the Eiffel Tower and use a telescope to search the city's skyline for a monument with a Route Marker on top: the Arc de Triomphe, which was the Pit Stop for this leg.

Additional note

- This episode was originally scheduled to air on September 12, 2001, but was postponed due to the September 11 attacks.

=== Leg 3 (France) ===
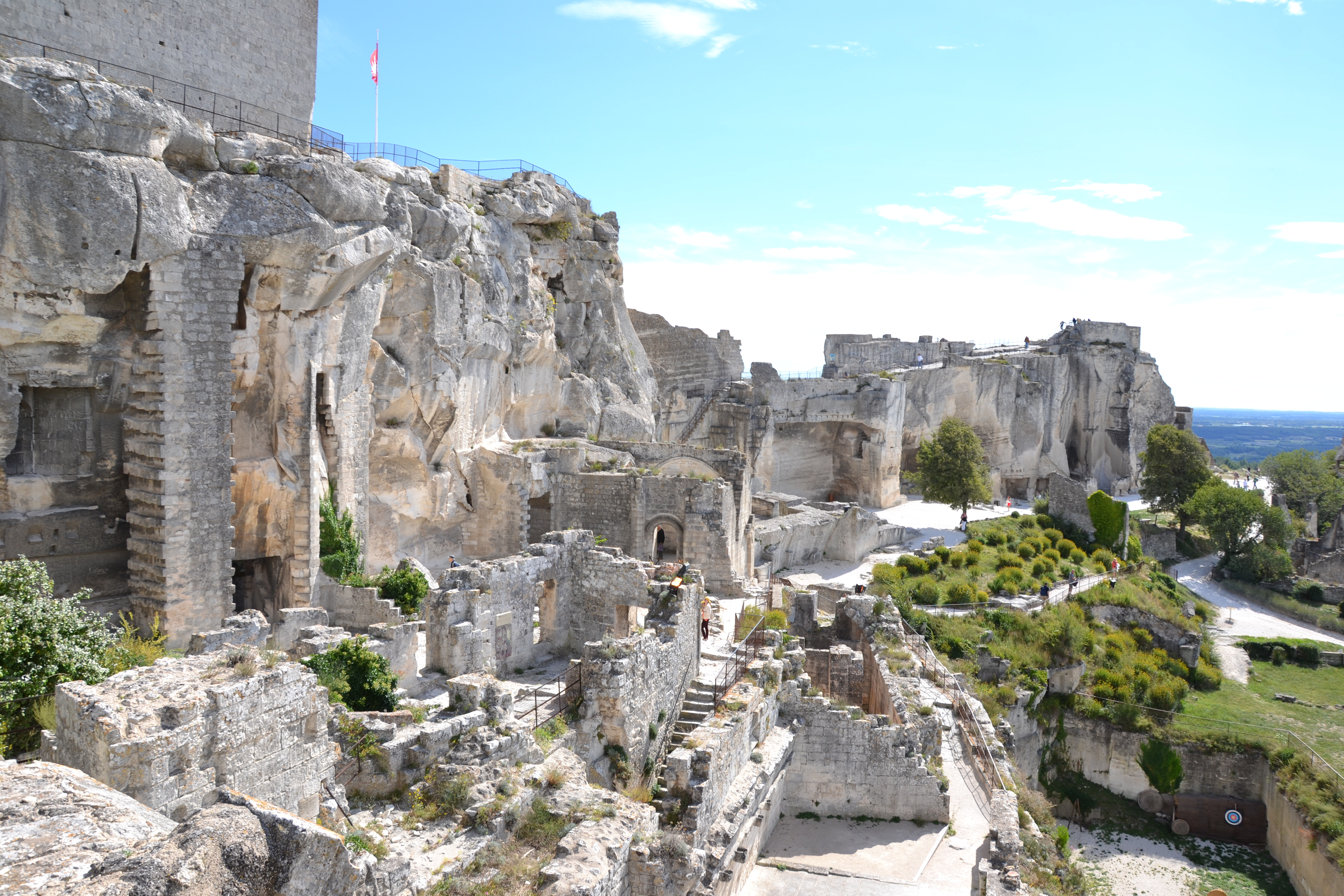
After leaving Paris, teams ended this leg in the ruins of the Château des Baux in the Alpilles mountains.

- Episode 3: "Home for Some" (September 26, 2001)
- Eliminated: Pat and Brenda

Locations

- Paris (Arc de Triomphe)
- Paris (Roue de Paris)
- Paris (Mariage Frères)
- Paris (Notre-Dame de Paris or Panthéon)
- Paris (Hôtel de Ville)
- Paris (Place du Châtelet)
- Paris → Avignon or Marseille
- Les Baux-de-Provence (Château des Baux)

Episode summary

- At the start of this leg, teams had to find "La Grande Roue" – "The Big Wheel" – and figure out that it was the nearby Roue de Paris, where they found their next clue.
- This leg's Fast Forward required one team to find the Mariage Frères tea shop in the Rive Gauche and ask for a specific tea. Kevin and Drew won the Fast Forward.
- This leg's Detour was a choice between Tough Climb or Easy Walk. In Tough Climb, teams had to travel to Notre-Dame de Paris and climb the cathedral's north tower to ring Quasimodo's bell and receive their next clue. In Easy Walk, teams had to locate the statue of a cat sitting next to Foucault's pendulum to find their next clue. However, there were two Foucault pendulums in Paris, but only the one at the Panthéon had a statue of a cat, while the one at the Museum of Arts and Crafts (French: Musée des Arts et Métiers) did not.
- After the Detour, teams had to find a man in a blue suit across from the Hôtel de Ville, who had their next clue.
- In this leg's Roadblock, one team member had to walk through the Paris sewers to the Place du Châtelet, where they found their next clue.
- After the Roadblock, teams had to travel by train and taxi to Les Baux-de-Provence, and then by foot to the Pit Stop at the Château des Baux.

=== Leg 4 (France → Tunisia) ===
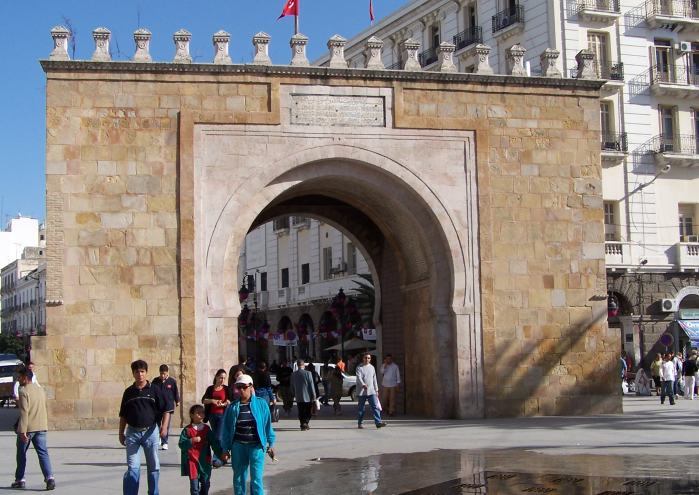
Once in Tunisia, teams had to find a man depicted in a photograph near the Bab el Bhar.

- Episode 4: "Colossal Showdown" (October 3, 2001)
- Eliminated: Dave and Margaretta

Locations

- Les Baux-de-Provence (Château des Baux)
- Marseille → Tunis, Tunisia
- Tunis (Bab el Bhar)
- Tunis (Medina of Tunis – Café Mnouchi or Hammam)
- El Djem (Amphitheatre of El Jem)

Episode summary

- At the start of this leg, teams were instructed to find a smaller version of the Arc de Triomphe in the country represented by a small flag:. Teams had to figure out that they had a Tunisian flag and that they needed to travel by ferry from Marseille to Tunis, Tunisia. Once there, they had to find the man depicted in a provided photograph near the Bab el Bhar and say a traditional greeting – As-salām (السلام) – to receive their next clue.
- This leg's Detour was a choice between Full Body Brew or Full Body Massage. In Full Body Brew, teams had to find the Café Mnouchi inside the Medina of Tunis and order two coffees to receive their next clue. In Full Body Massage, teams had to search for a massage parlor marked on a provided map and receive a 20-minute massage before they could receive their next clue.
- After the Detour, teams received a lighter marked with a picture of the Amphitheatre of El Jem with the words "Go Here" on the back.
- In this leg's Roadblock, one team member had to light a torch, navigate the amphitheatre, and find the pit of death. They then had to retrieve a sword above a pit, find their way out of the maze of tunnels, and bring it to the Pit Stop.

=== Leg 5 (Tunisia) ===
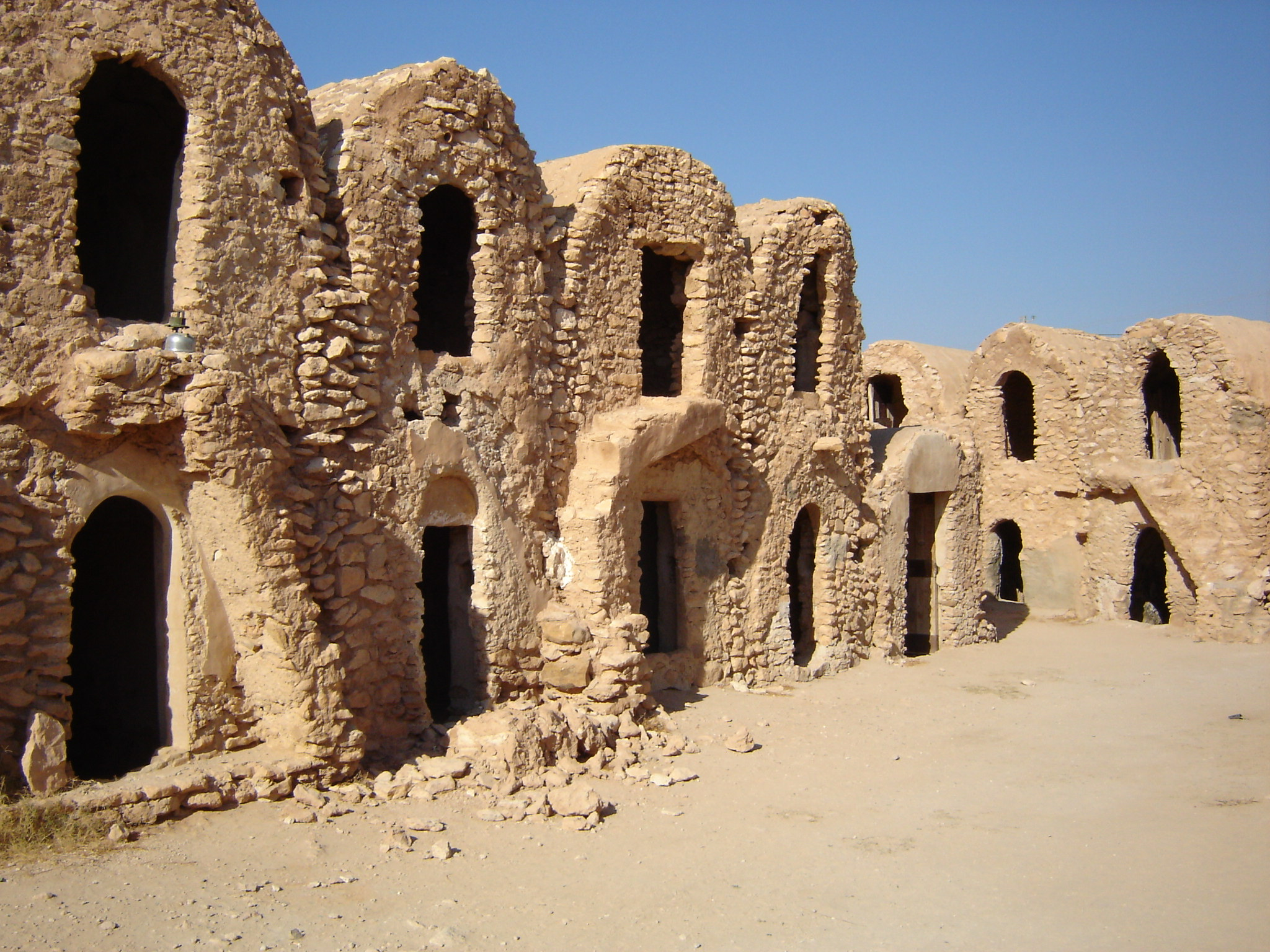
While in Tataouine, teams visited the ksars of Tunisia for the Detour.

- Episode 5: "Desert Storm" (October 10, 2001)
- Eliminated: Paul and Amie

Locations

- El Djem (Amphitheatre of El Jem)
- Tataouine (Monument to the Memory of the Earth)
- Tataouine Governorate (Ksar Hadada)
- Jebil National Park (Ksar Ghilane – Camel Outpost)
- Jebil National Park (Ksar Ghilane – Oasis)

Episode summary

- At the start of this leg, teams received a photograph of a globe monument – the Memory of the Earth (French: Memoire de la Terre) – and instructions to travel to Tataouine to find their next clue. Teams also found cars that served as their transportation for the rest of the leg. They could hire a driver for US$50, but drivers could not provide directions, so all teams had to navigate using a simple provided map.
- This leg's Detour was a choice between Listening or Puzzling. In Listening, teams had to find the Star Wars movie set Ksar Hadada and use a supplied walkie-talkie to locate the radio's counterpart hidden somewhere in the labyrinth of caves along with their next clue. In Puzzling, teams would have had to find Ksar Ouled Soltane and solve a simple dice game to receive their next clue. All teams chose Listening.
- After the Detour, teams had to use a map, a compass, and a series of painted stones to find an arrow located approximately one mile (1.6 km) north of Guermessa that directed them along a path across the Sahara to their next clue at Ksar Ghilane.
- In this leg's Roadblock, one team member had to ride a camel and use a set of compass directions to reach the flag visible in the distance in the middle of the desert. The non-participating member had to trek alongside on foot. Once they reached the route marker, teams found a new set of compass directions to the Pit Stop: the Ksar Ghilane oasis.

Additional note

- Paul and Amie missed the Roadblock entirely and became lost in the Sahara Desert. Hours after all of the other teams checked in, Paul happened to see the oasis in the distance and drove there, unaware that it was the Pit Stop.Production crew had also been driving through the desert looking for Paul and Amie's vehicle.

=== Leg 6 (Tunisia → Italy) ===
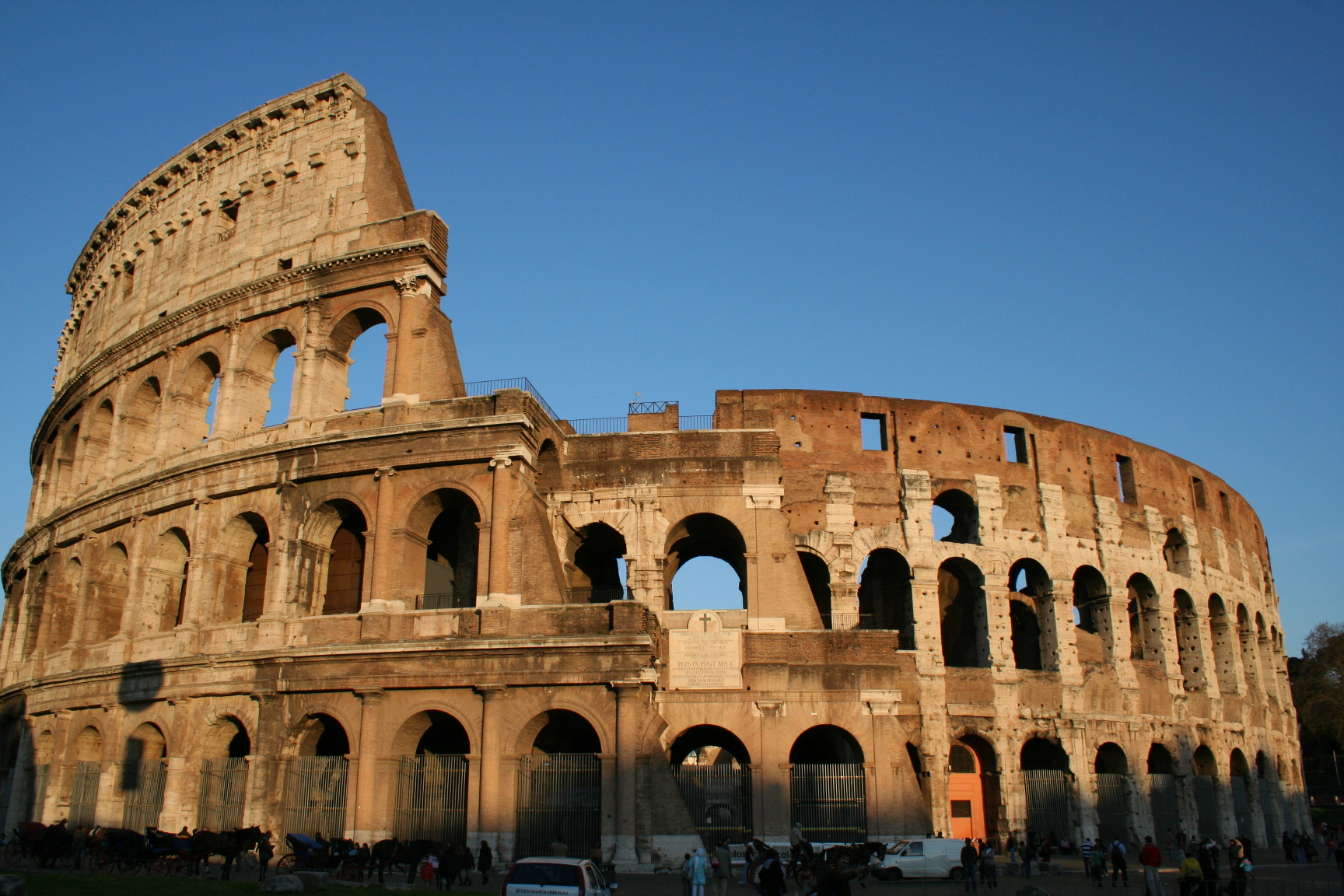
After arriving in Rome, teams found their first clue outside the Colosseum.

- Episode 6: "Whatever It Takes to Win" (October 17, 2001)

Locations

- Gabès (Streets of Gabès)
- La Marsa (Hôtel Le Palace)
- Tunis → Rome, Italy
- Rome (Colosseum)
- Rome (Palazzo dei Conservatori or Monumento Nazionale a Vittorio Emanuele II)
- Rome → Castelfranco Emilia
- San Cesario sul Panaro (Pagani Auto Factory)
- Sant'Agata Bolognese (Town Square)

Episode summary

- During the Pit Stop, a sandstorm forced the teams to move as a safety precaution to Gabès. At the start of this leg, teams had to travel to the Hôtel Le Palace near Tunis to find their next clue, which instructed them to fly to Rome, Italy, and find their next clue outside of the location on a provided photograph: the Colosseum.
- This leg's Detour was a choice between Foot or Hoof. In Foot, teams had to find a statue of a foot at the Palazzo dei Conservatori using a provided picture to find their next clue. In Hoof, teams were given a partial picture of a more obscure statue depicting the hoof of the equestrian statue of Vittorio Emanuele II. If teams completed this task, they found a line of taxis waiting for them.
- After the Detour, teams had to travel by train to Castelfranco Emilia and then by taxi to the Pagani Auto Factory, where they found their next clue.
- In this leg's Roadblock, one team member had to drive a Smart car to the town square of Sant'Agata Bolognese using a map written entirely in Italian. Their partner was driven to the square in a Pagani Zonda traveling at 180 miles per hour (290 km/h). Once team members were reunited, they could check in at the Pit Stop.

Additional notes

- Due to an airport strike in Rome, all flights to Rome were either fully booked or cancelled. As a result, teams had the option of either flying to another destination in Europe and taking a connecting flight or train to Rome, or risk waiting in Tunis until direct evening flights to Rome might become available.
- This was a non-elimination leg.

=== Leg 7 (Italy → India) ===
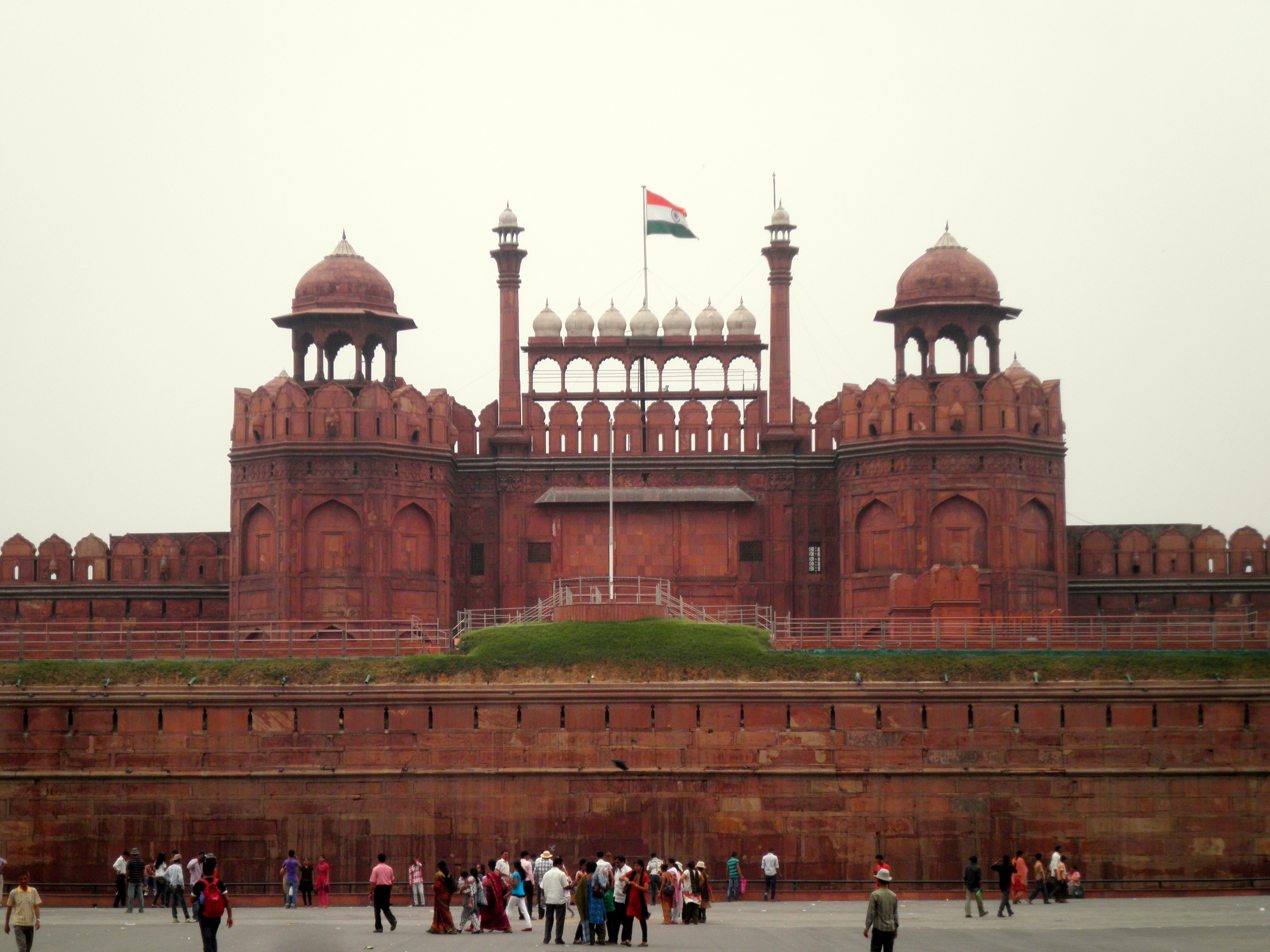
Once in Delhi, India, teams visited the Red Fort.

- Episode 7: "Triumph and Loss" (October 24, 2001)
- Eliminated: Lenny and Karyn

Locations

- Sant'Agata Bolognese (Town Square)
- Ferrara (Castello Estense)
- Ferrara (Aeroclub Volovelistico Ferrarese or Bicycle Shop)
- Ferrara (Ferrara railway station) → Rome or Milan
- Rome or Milan → Delhi, India
- Delhi (Red Fort)
- Delhi (Chandni Chowk)
- Agra (Taj Khema Hotel)

Episode summary

- This leg's Detour was a choice between Glide or Ride. In Glide, teams traveled to the town of Ferrara, where one team member rode in a glider with a professional glider pilot while their partner rode in the towing plane. Once completed, the team received a free taxi ride to the Ferrara railway station, where they found their next clue. In Ride, teams had to travel to a bicycle shop in Ferrara and then ride eight kilometres (5 mi) to the railway station following a street map to retrieve their next clue.
- This leg's Fast Forward required one team to find Castello Estense in Ferrara and row a boat around the castle's moat to find the Fast Forward award hidden in the wall. Frank and Margarita won the Fast Forward.
- After the Detour, teams were instructed to fly to Delhi, India, by catching a train to either Rome or Milan, from which they could fly to Delhi. Once there, teams found their next clue outside the Red Fort.
- In this leg's Roadblock, one team member had to hire a cycle rickshaw and find a specific shopkeeper in the Chandni Chowk market, who showed them a replica of the Taj Mahal along with their next clue, which directed them to the Pit Stop: the Taj Khema Hotel in Agra.

=== Leg 8 (India) ===
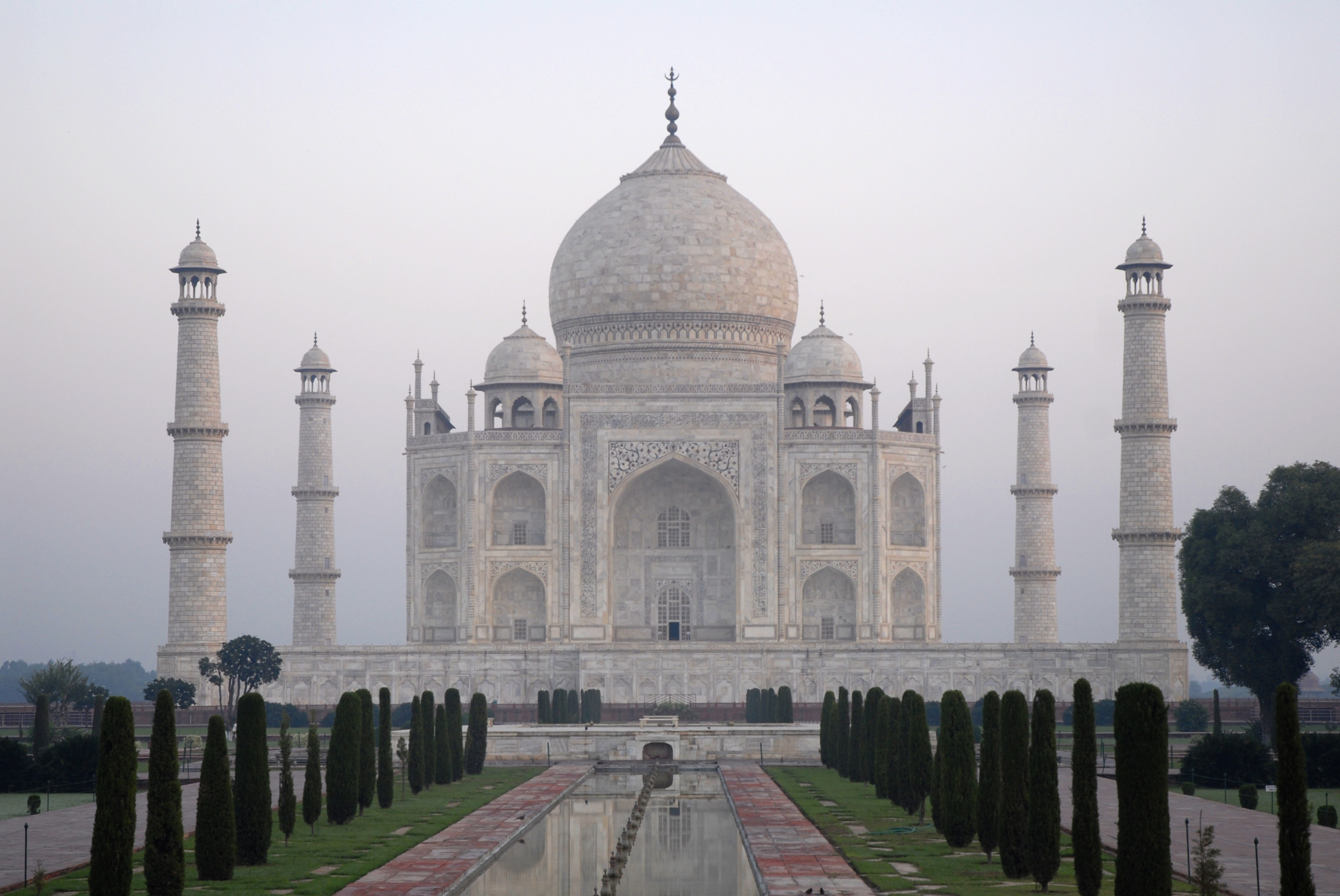
Teams visited the Taj Mahal in Agra during this leg.

- Episode 8: "Competition to the Fullest" (October 31, 2001)

Locations

- Agra (Taj Khema Hotel)
- Agra (Taj Mahal)
- Jaipur (Palace of the Winds)
- Amber (Amber Fort) or Jaipur (Jal Mahal)
- Jaipur → Bikaner
- Deshnoke (Karni Mata Temple)
- Bikaner (Laxmi Niwas Palace)

Episode summary

- At the start of this leg, teams had to search the grounds of the Taj Mahal for their next clue, which instructed them to travel to the Palace of the Winds in Jaipur.
- This leg's Detour was a choice between Elephant or Rowboat. In Elephant, teams had to ride an elephant up to the Amber Fort and then find a holy man who had their next clue. In Rowboat, teams had to reach the Jal Mahal water palace using a rowboat and then find a holy man who had their next clue.
- After the Detour, teams were instructed to travel by train to Bikaner and then travel to Karni Mata Temple, where they found their next clue.
- In this leg's Roadblock, one team member had to search the temple, filled with rodents which the locals consider holy, for a canister that contained their next clue. This directed them to the Pit Stop: the Laxmi Niwas Palace in Bikaner.

Additional note

- This was a non-elimination leg.

=== Leg 9 (India → Thailand) ===
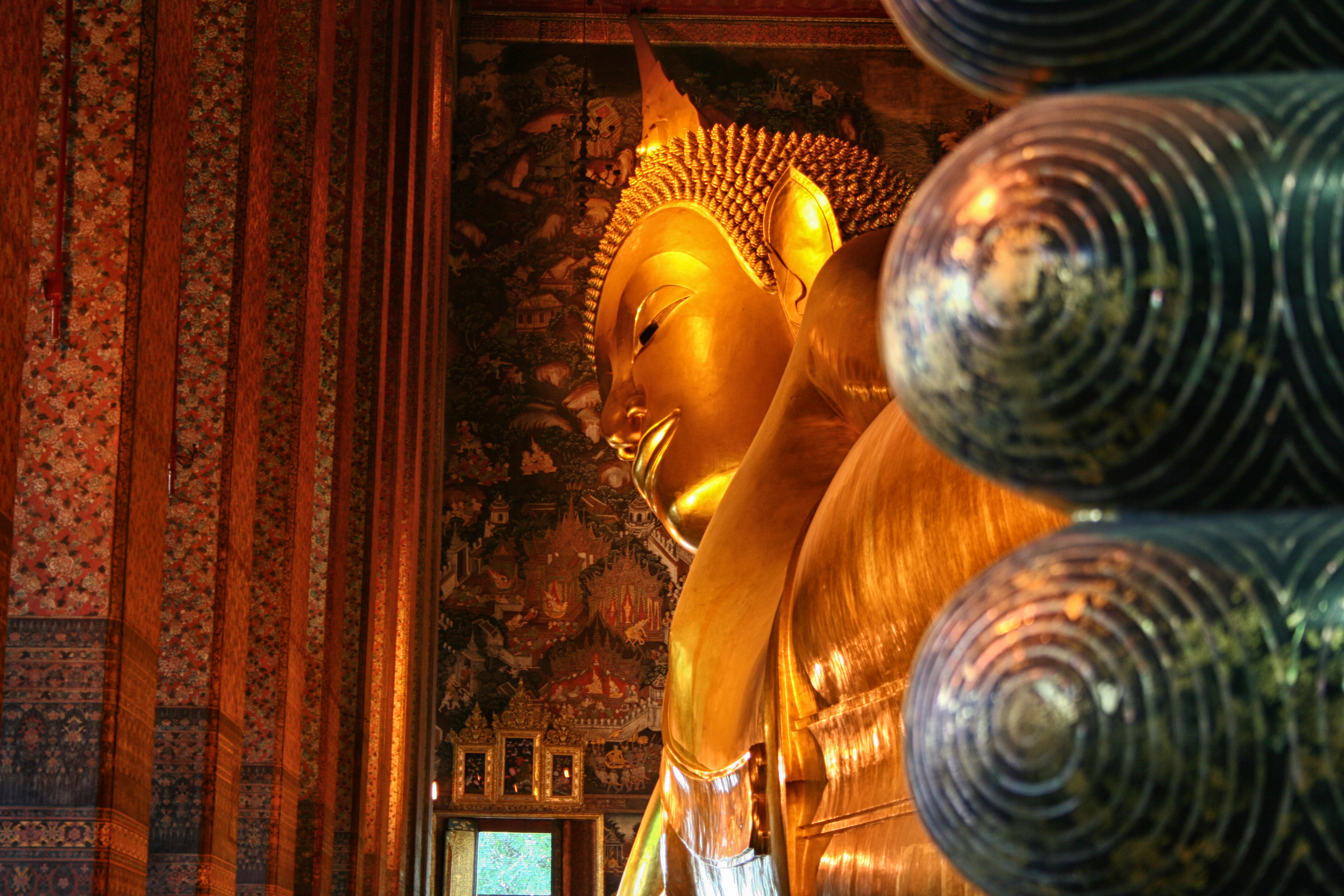
The Fast Forward in Bangkok took place at the Temple of the Reclining Buddha.

- Episode 9: "The Unexpected Twist" (November 14, 2001)
- Eliminated: Nancy and Emily

Locations

- Bikaner (Laxmi Niwas Palace)
- or Bikaner → Delhi
- Delhi → Bangkok, Thailand
- Bangkok (Temple of the Reclining Buddha)
- Bangkok (Temple of Dawn)
- Bangkok (Southern Bus Terminal or Bangkok Yai)
- Kanchanaburi (Buddhist Monastery)
- Krabi (Tiger Cave Temple)

Episode summary

- At the start of this leg, teams were instructed to travel by bus or train back to Delhi and then fly to Bangkok, Thailand.
- This season's final Fast Forward required teams to travel to the Temple of the Reclining Buddha and play a traditional Buddhist game using the 108 urns alongside the giant reclining Buddha. They had to choose a bowl of coins and drop exactly one coin in every urn. The first team to find the bowl with exactly 108 coins would win the Fast Forward. Joe and Bill defeated Nancy and Emily and won the Fast Forward.
- Teams who did not attempt the Fast Forward had to travel to the Temple of Dawn, where they found their next clue.
- This leg's Detour was a choice between Public or Private. Both tasks required teams to find transportation to Kanchanaburi. In Public, teams had to ride a public bus which left every 20 minutes, paying with their own money. In Private, teams had to find a specified private vehicle, using only a license plate number and a crude map of the nearby area, which would provide them a free ride to Kanchanaburi.
- In this leg's Roadblock, one team member had to dress like a Buddhist monk, walk through a pit of tigers, and retrieve their next clue, which directed them to the Pit Stop: the Tiger Cave Temple in Krabi.

Additional note

- Nancy and Emily became frustrated after spending hours searching fruitlessly for the private vehicle, and took a taxi to Kanchanaburi instead of completing the Detour, for which they incurred a 24-hour penalty and were thus eliminated from the race.

=== Leg 10 (Thailand) ===
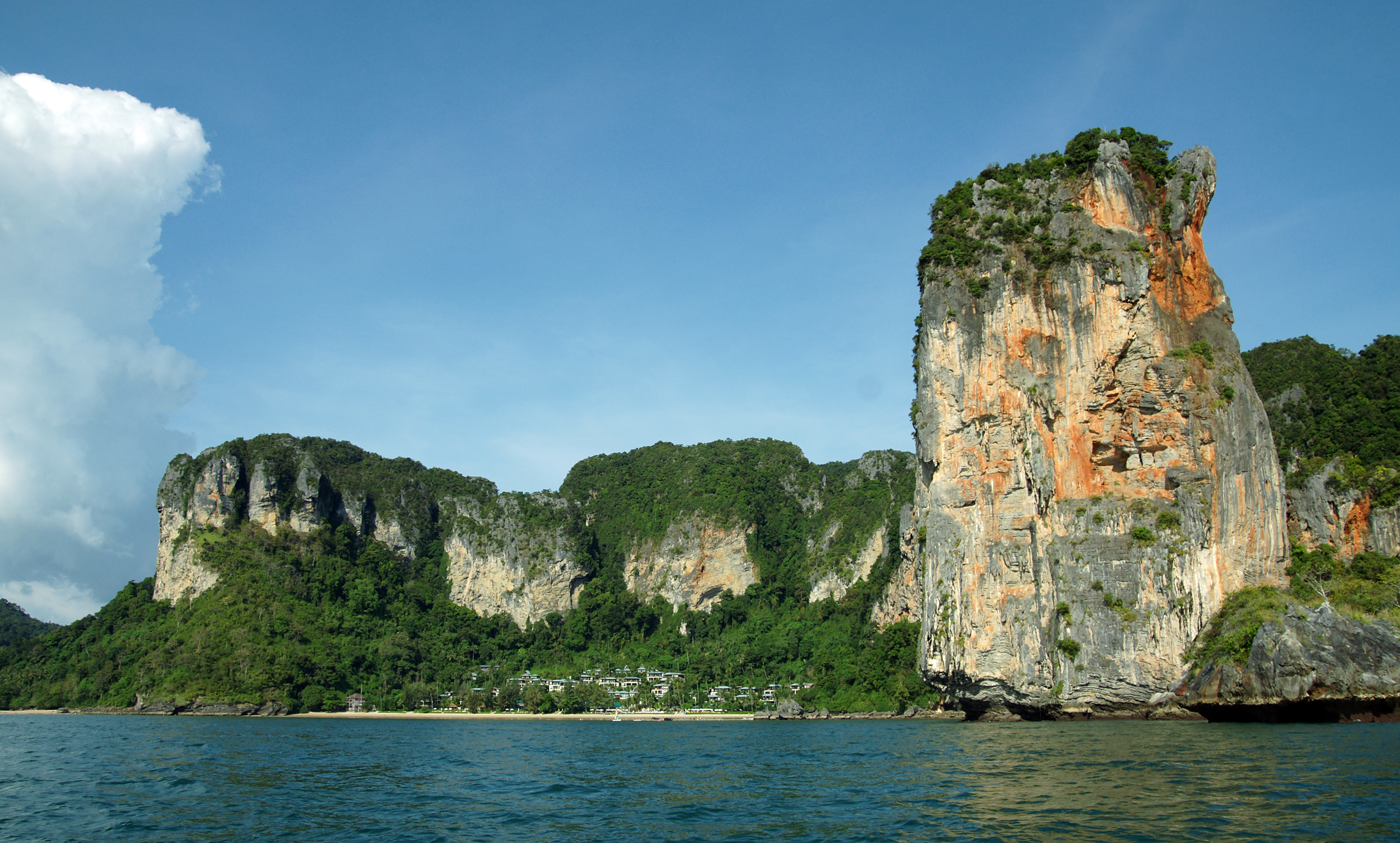
Teams ended this leg at Pai Plong Beach in the province of Krabi in southern Thailand.

- Episode 10: "To the Physical and Mental Limit" (November 21, 2001)

Locations

- Krabi (Tiger Cave Temple)
- Ao Phang Nga National Park (Railay Beach – King Climbers)
- Ao Phang Nga National Park (Thaiwand Wall)
- Ao Phang Nga National Park (Thaiwand Wall → Railay Beach)
- Ao Phang Nga National Park (Railay Beach) → Ao Nang (Ao Nang Beach)
- Ao Nang (Sea, Land & Trek)
- Ao Nang (Ao Nang Beach) → Ao Phang Nga National Park (Chicken Island)
- Ao Nang (Pai Plong Beach)

Episode summary

- At the start of this leg, teams were instructed to find "The King" at Railay Beach – the King Climbers rock climbing school – where they received rock-climbing equipment, and then hiked through the jungle to reach Thaiwand Wall and their next clue.
- This leg's Detour was a choice between Hike or Climb. In Hike, teams would have had to travel on a winding path up Thaiwand Wall to their next clue. In Climb, teams had to rock climb straight up Thaiwand Wall to their next clue. All teams chose Climb.
- After the Detour, teams had to rappel down to the boat that brought them back to Railay Beach, where they then proceeded to Sea, Land & Trek rafting company, where they found their next clue.
- In this leg's Roadblock, one team member had to paddle a kayak with their partner down the river in search of a route marker flag. Once spotted, they had to climb into a nearby cave, Tham Hua Kalok, where they found their next clue along with snorkeling gear.
- After the Roadblock, teams had to paddle back to Sea, Land & Trek. Teams then had to hire a boat at Ao Nang Beach and find a route marker bobbing in the water near Chicken Island, where they had to dive in the water and retrieve their next clue, which directed them to the Pit Stop: Pai Plong Beach.

Additional note

- This was a non-elimination leg.

=== Leg 11 (Thailand → China) ===
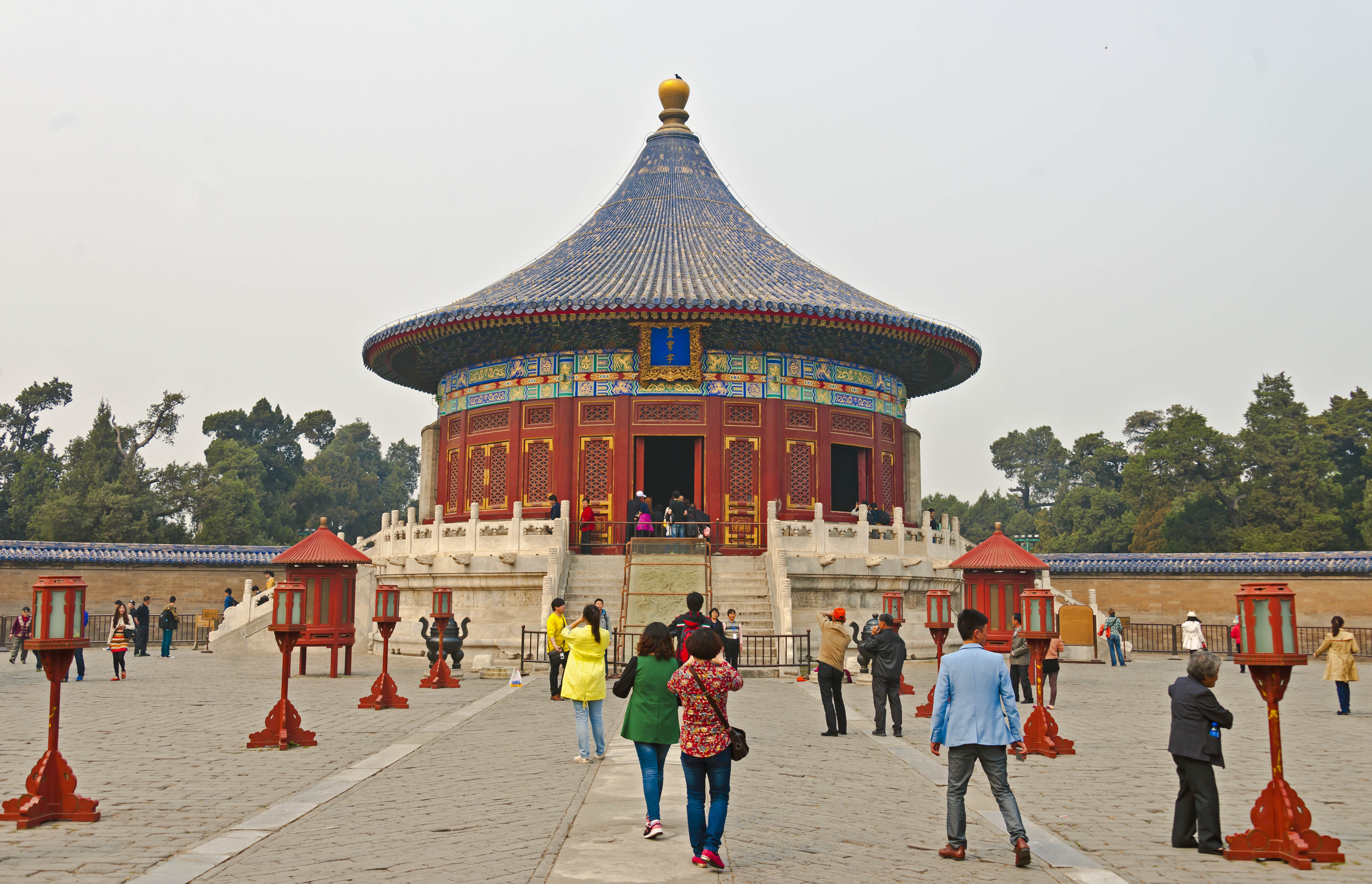
The southern gate of Tiantan Park in Beijing was the 11th Pit Stop of this season.

- Episode 11: "Fight to the Last Minute" (November 28, 2001)
- Eliminated: Kevin and Drew

Locations

- Ao Nang (Pai Plong Beach)
- Phuket → Beijing, China
- Beijing (Jingshan Park – Top Pavilion)
- Beijing (Community Center or Quan Xin Yuan Restaurant)
- Beijing (Hongqiao Market)
- Beijing (Donghuamen Night Market)
- Beijing (Tiantan Park)

Episode summary

- At the start of this leg, teams were instructed to fly to Beijing, China. Once there, teams found their next clue at Jingshan Park.
- This leg's Detour was a choice between Volley or Rally. In Volley, teams had to score five points in a game of ping-pong against a local champion to receive their next clue. In Rally, teams had to travel by three forms of local transportation – bus, motorcycle taxi, and pedicab – to Quan Xin Yuan Restaurant, where they found their next clue.
- After the Detour, teams had to retrieve a shopping list, written almost entirely in Mandarin Chinese, at the Hongqiao Market and use it to purchase five beetle larvae, one squid, and two chicken feet. Teams then traveled to the Donghuamen Night Market, where they found their next clue.
- In this leg's Roadblock, one team member had to give the items they'd just bought to a chef at the market for him to prepare and then eat all three dishes to receive their next clue, which directed them to the Pit Stop: the South Gate of Tiantan Park.

Additional note

- Frank and Margarita, and Rob and Brennan, caught a much earlier flight to Beijing than Joe and Bill, and Kevin and Drew. As a result, Joe and Bill, and Kevin and Drew, were almost a full day behind the other teams when they arrived in Beijing. Joe and Bill would remain almost a full day behind the remaining two teams for the rest of the race.

=== Leg 12 (China → United States) ===
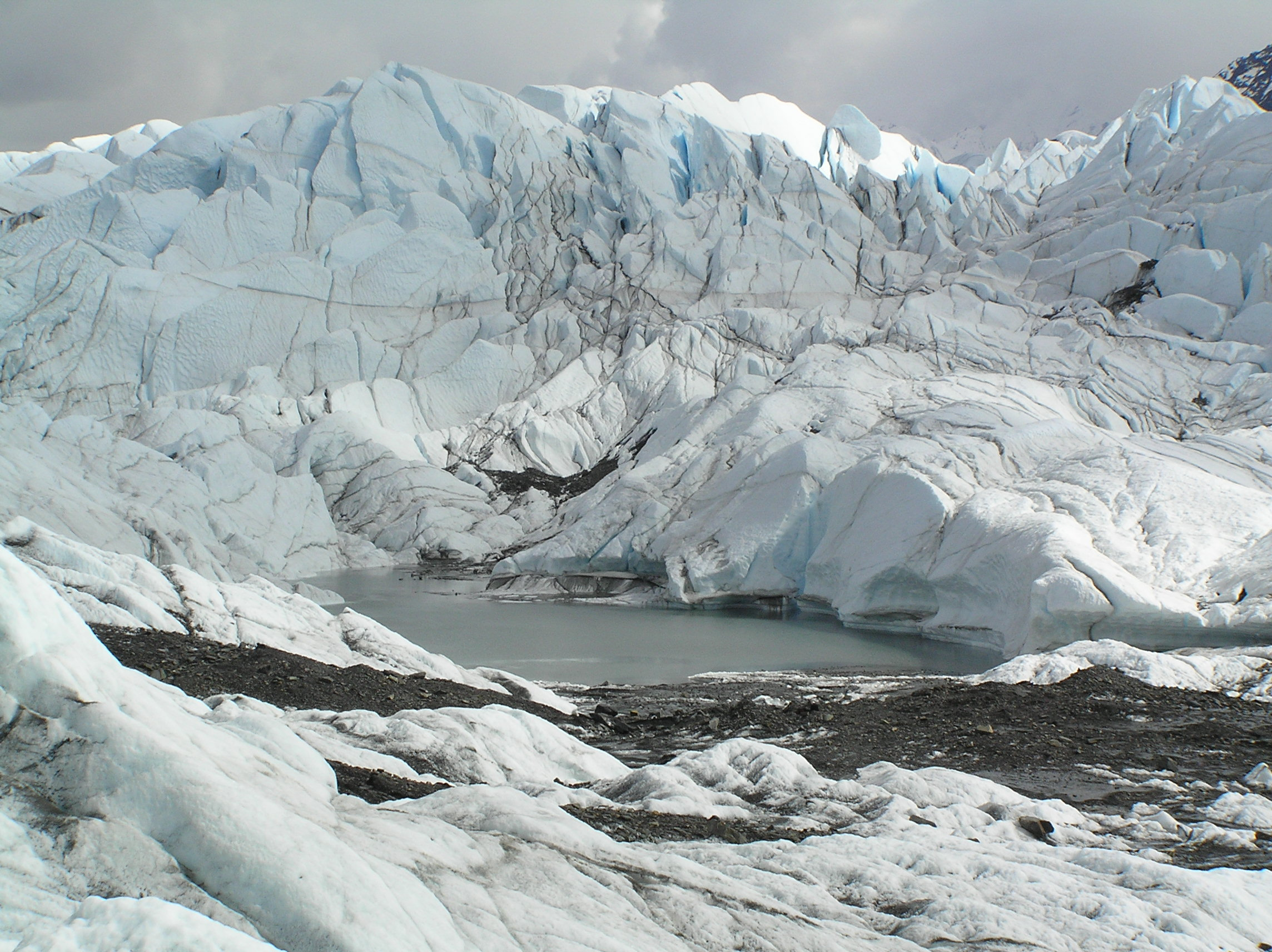
In Alaska, teams visited the Matanuska Glacier for the leg's Roadblock.

- Episode 12: "Race to the Finish – Part 1" (December 5, 2001)

Locations

- Beijing (Tiantan Park)
- Beijing (Great Wall of China – Juyong Pass)
- Beijing → Anchorage, Alaska
- Scotty Lake (North Country Bed and Breakfast)
- Glacier View (Matanuska Glacier)
- Trapper Creek (Highway Mile Marker 131)
- Trapper Creek (Wilderness Cabin)

Episode summary

- At the start of this leg, teams had to use a map to find three kite flyers in Tiantan Park with their next clue attached to the kites. Teams were then instructed to travel to the Great Wall of China to find their next clue.
- This leg's Detour at the Great Wall of China was a choice between Flat or Steep. In Flat, teams would have had to walk along a long, flat path to a faraway pavilion. In Steep, teams had to hike up a much shorter, but extremely steep, path to a closer pavilion, where they found their next clue. All teams chose Steep.
- Teams were instructed to fly to Anchorage, Alaska. Once there, teams were driven to North Country Bed and Breakfast in Scotty Lake, where they spent the night. The next morning, one team member had to participate in an Alaskan blanket toss known as Nalukataq and spot a nearby route marker on the ice, where they found their next clue, which directed them to the Matanuska Glacier.
- In this leg's Roadblock, one team member had to climb an ice wall and retrieve their next clue from the top of the glacier.
- After the Roadblock, teams had to drive to highway mile marker 131 near Denali State Park, where they rode snowmobiles to the Pit Stop at a wilderness cabin.

Additional note

- This was a non-elimination leg.

=== Leg 13 (United States) ===
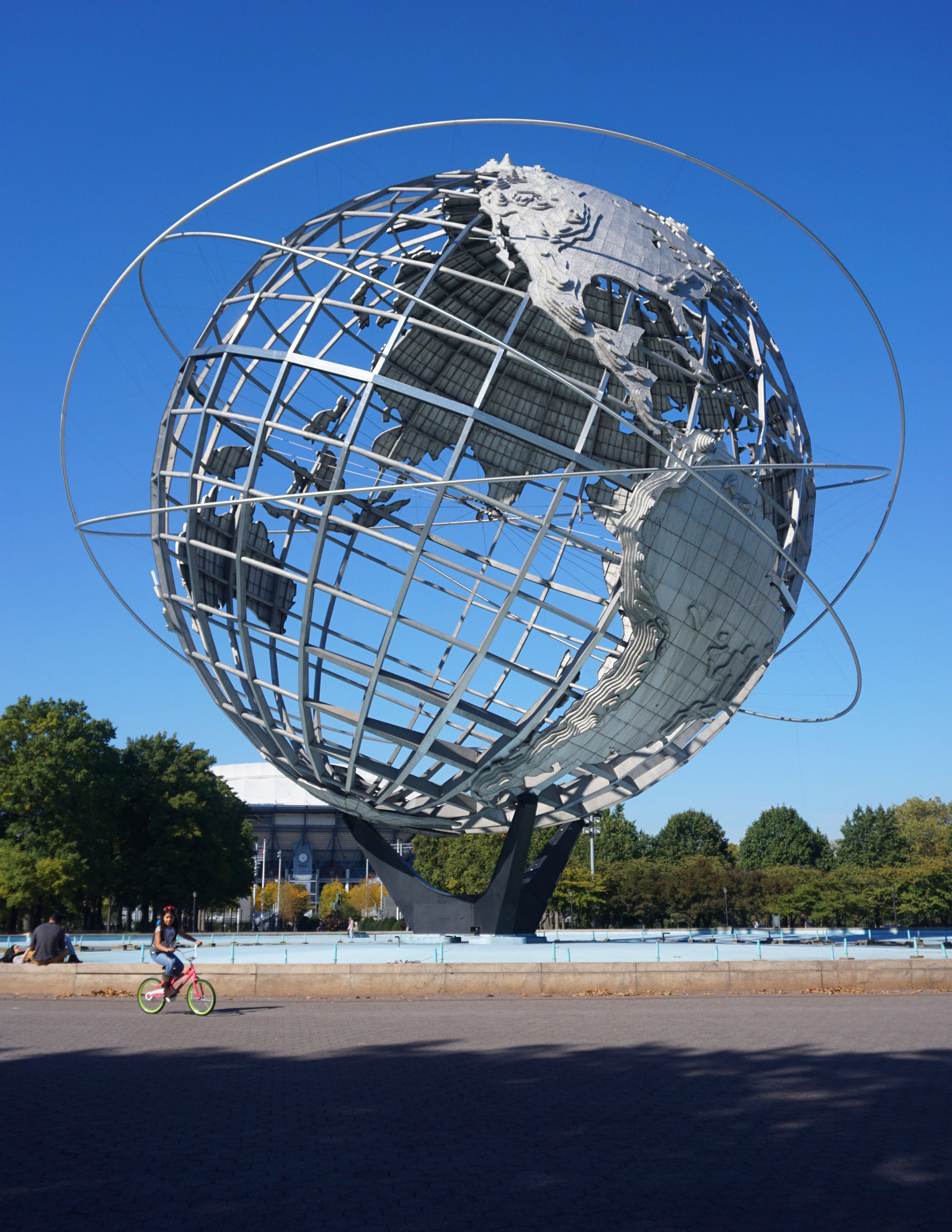
The Unisphere at Flushing Meadows Park in the New York borough of Queens was the finish line of the inaugural season of The Amazing Race.

- Episode 13: "Race to the Finish – Part 2" (December 13, 2001)
- Prize: US$1,000,000
- Winners: Rob and Brennan
- Runners-up: Frank and Margarita
- Third place: Joe and Bill

Locations

- Trapper Creek (Wilderness Cabin)
- Trapper Creek (Takosha Lodge)
- Talkeetna (Fish Lake)
- Anchorage → Newark, New Jersey
- New York City, New York (Vincent Daniels Square)
- New York City (52nd Street–Lincoln Avenue Station → Willets Point–Shea Stadium Station)
- New York City (Flushing Meadows Park – Unisphere)

Episode summary

- At the start of this leg, teams had to don snowshoes, follow flags 1/2 mile (800 m) to Takosha Lodge, and find their next clue.
- This season's final Detour was a choice between Dog Power or Horsepower. In Dog Power, teams had to ride dog sleds 11 miles (18 km) to their next clue. In Horsepower, teams would have ridden snowmobiles 30 miles (48 km) to their next clue. Both teams chose Dog Power.
- After the Detour, teams had to drive to Fish Lake, where they found their next clue.
- In this season's final Roadblock, one team member had to strip down, plunge into the lake, and retrieve their next clue.
- After the Roadblock, teams were instructed to fly to New York City. Once there, teams had to travel by taxi to Vincent Daniels Square in Queens and find their final clue. Teams were instructed to take the 7 train to the Willets Point–Shea Stadium Station and then follow the flags to the finish line: the Unisphere in Flushing Meadows Park.

Additional note

- Joe and Bill had fallen so far behind the other teams that by the time they began the leg in Alaska, Rob and Brennan and Frank and Margarita had already crossed the finish line in New York. Instead of receiving their next clue, Joe and Bill received notice that the race had ended when they opened their clue envelope at the Takosha Lodge.

== Reception ==
=== Critical response ===
The review aggregator Rotten Tomatoes reported an approval rating of 92%, based on 13 critics' reviews as of August 2023. The website's critical consensus reads, "The Amazing Race elevates reality television conventions with its globetrotting scale, making for a suspenseful competition and fascinating travelogue." Metacritic, which uses a weighted average, assigned a score of 72 out of 100 based on 24 critic reviews, indicating "generally favorable" reviews.

Following the season's premiere, Tom Shales of The Washington Post wrote, "[The Amazing Race] brings new energy and respectability to the 'reality' genre popularized by the same network's Survivor – and surpasses it in spectacle and human drama. Great TV lives." Michael Speier of Variety wrote, "Television gets back to real reality via The Amazing Race. With this thrilling trip around the world, CBS blows away the Summer of Rats – thank you Fear Factor – while creating a terrific companion piece to the net's comparatively tranquil Survivor." Linda Stasi of the New York Post wrote, "I never thought I'd love a reality show, because mostly I hated all those shows with their wannabe models, fat yutzes and half-wits who try to be as smart as the fat yutz from Survivor but are dumber than a family tree of Bushes. But this one actually is so good I am already addicted." Hal Boedeker of the Orlando Sentinel wrote, "Classier than Fear Factor, clearer than The Mole and swifter than Survivor, CBS' The Amazing Race jolts the reality format with tantalizing thrills. Rob Owen of the Pittsburgh Post-Gazette wrote, "An exhilarating, fast-paced competition filled with colorful characters, The Amazing Race is a pulse-pounding good time." Ed Bark of The Dallas Morning News wrote, "It all makes for a watchable feast of accidental tourists navigating various twists, turns and blind alleys. Amazing Race seems to be well-cast with vivid characters."

Conversely, following the show's premiere, Terry Kelleher of People called it a "half-decent start". Anita Gates of The New York Times wrote that while the show may be less mean-spirited than previous reality show, it "may not be what viewers who love reality shows want to see." Howard Rosenberg of the Los Angeles Times wrote that it had "all the interest and awareness of an air-conditioned tour bus roaring by Nantucket."

Following the season's conclusion, Linda Holmes of Television Without Pity wrote that she "was flat-out hooked for thirteen weeks, and the ending managed not to disappoint, which almost never happens." Matt Roush of TV Guide called this season "TV's best reality show". Allan Johnson of the Chicago Tribune called the first season "a satisfying race around the world". Dalton Ross of Entertainment Weekly called it "[2001's] most exciting reality adventure. The fast-paced editing, breathtaking scenery, and almost perfect casting made for truly pulse-racing programming." In 2015, Joe Reid of Decider wrote, "It really is a remarkably well-structured, well-edited, well-conceived, and well-cast season of reality television. This show made its reputation for a reason." In 2016, this season was ranked 5th out of the first 27 seasons by the Rob Has a Podcast Amazing Race correspondents. Kareem Gantt of Screen Rant wrote that this season "had a great cast, truly awesome locations, and challenges that kept the viewer on the edge". In 2021, Jane Andrews of Gossip Cop ranked this season as the fourth best. In 2022, Jason Shomer of Collider ranked this season among the show's top seven seasons. In 2022, Rhenn Taguiam of Game Rant ranked this season as the overall best season. In 2024, Taguiam's ranking was updated with this season remaining as the overall best season.

The DVD boxed set for season 1 was released on September 27, 2005. Kevin and Drew, Lenny and Karyn, Joe and Bill, and Rob and Brennan did commentary on four episodes.

=== Ratings ===
Ratings for season 1 fell short of expectations, as the series premiered six days prior to the September 11 attacks, after which viewership fell amid preemption for news coverage. The show was further hindered by the lack of media coverage and promotion as networks focused on news stories. Additionally, the show premiered and competed in the same time slot as with NBC's short-lived Lost, another travel reality game show with a similar premise. The show premiered with 11,800,000 viewers. By midseason, ratings had dropped with the sixth and seventh episodes pulling 8,370,000 and 9,170,000 viewers respectively. By the time of the finale, the show rebounded with 13,650,000 viewers.

| No. overall | No. in season | Title | Original release date | U.S. viewers (millions) | Rating/share (18–49) |
|---|---|---|---|---|---|
| 1 | 1 | "The Race Begins" | September 5, 2001 | 11.83 | 5.0/13 |
| 2 | 2 | "Divide and Conquer" | September 19, 2001 | 10.02 | 4.6/12 |
| 3 | 3 | "Home for Some" | September 26, 2001 | 8.62 | 3.6/9 |
| 4 | 4 | "Colossal Showdown" | October 3, 2001 | 8.70 | 3.9/10 |
| 5 | 5 | "Desert Storm" | October 10, 2001 | 8.28 | 3.7/9 |
| 6 | 6 | "Whatever It Takes to Win" | October 17, 2001 | 8.37 | 3.6/9 |
| 7 | 7 | "Triumph and Loss" | October 24, 2001 | 9.17 | 4.0/10 |
| 8 | 8 | "Competition to the Fullest" | October 31, 2001 | 8.40 | 3.6/9 |
| 9 | 9 | "The Unexpected Twist" | November 14, 2001 | 9.44 | 3.8/9 |
| 10 | 10 | "To the Physical and Mental Limit" | November 21, 2001 | 8.24 | 3.1/9 |
| 11 | 11 | "Fight to the Last Minute" | November 28, 2001 | 9.48 | 4.1/10 |
| 12 | 12 | "Race to the Finish – Part 1" | December 5, 2001 | 9.39 | 3.7/9 |
| 13 | 13 | "Race to the Finish – Part 2" | December 13, 2001 | 13.65 | 6.0/15 |

== Works cited ==
- Castro, Adam-Troy (2006). My Ox Is Broken!. BenBella Books. ISBN 978-1-932100-91-4.
