= Tiger Cave Temple =

Buddhist temple north-northeast of Krabi, Thailand

Coordinates: 8.1240°N 98.9252°E

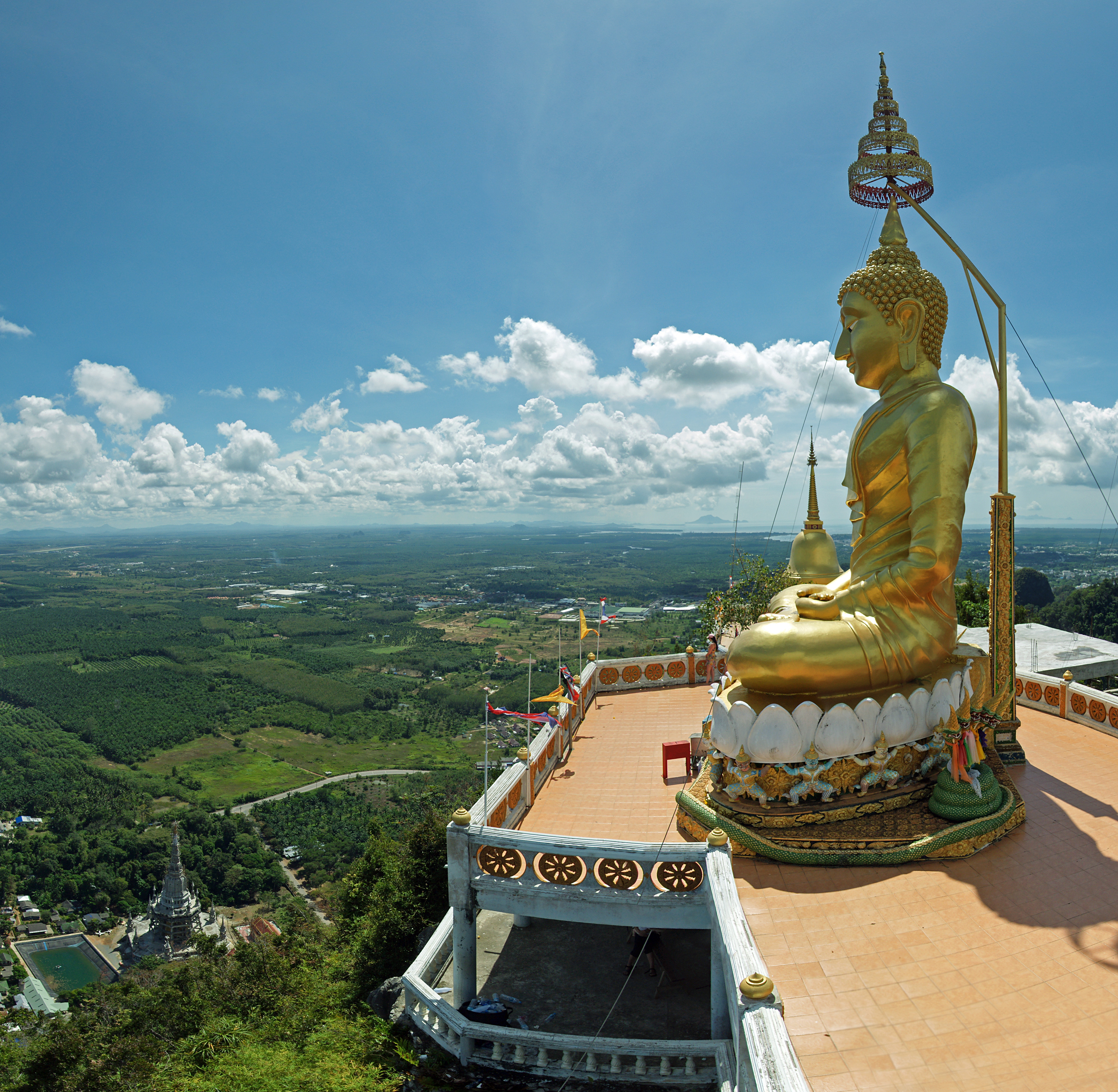
Summit at Tiger Cave Temple.

The Tiger Cave Temple (Thai: วัดถ้ำเสือ, RTGS: wat tham suea) is a Buddhist temple north-northeast of Krabi, Thailand. A sacred site, it is known for the tiger paw prints in the cave, tall Buddha statues and the strenuous flight of stairs to reach the summit.

== History ==
The foundation of the temple dates back to 1975 (B.E. 2518) when a Vipassana monk named Jumnean Seelasettho (Ajahn Jumnean) went to meditate in the cave. During his meditation, he witnessed tigers roaming around the cave. This discovery led to naming the temple Wat Tham Suea. Another legend says that an actual huge tiger used to live and roam the cave. The naming of the temple also comes from discoveries of a tiger paw prints on the cave walls, and also the bulge of the cave resembling a tiger's paw.

== Geography ==
The surroundings of Wat Tham Suea consist of a tropical rain forest including many old trees in the Kiriwong Valley. Caves to visit are Tum Khon Than, Tum Lod, Tum Chang Kaeo, and Tum Luk. Many Thanu ancient artifacts were found around the caves and temple grounds. Mountains also cover most of the land around the Tham Sua region along with many other small caves that are not accessible to tourists. In various parts of the temple, you can see human skeletons and decorated skulls.

The Tham Sua temple is a Thai Buddhist meditation center and also has places of archaeological and historical significance. Examples of these historical attractions are stone tools, pottery shards, and molded Buddha footprints.

== Staircase ==
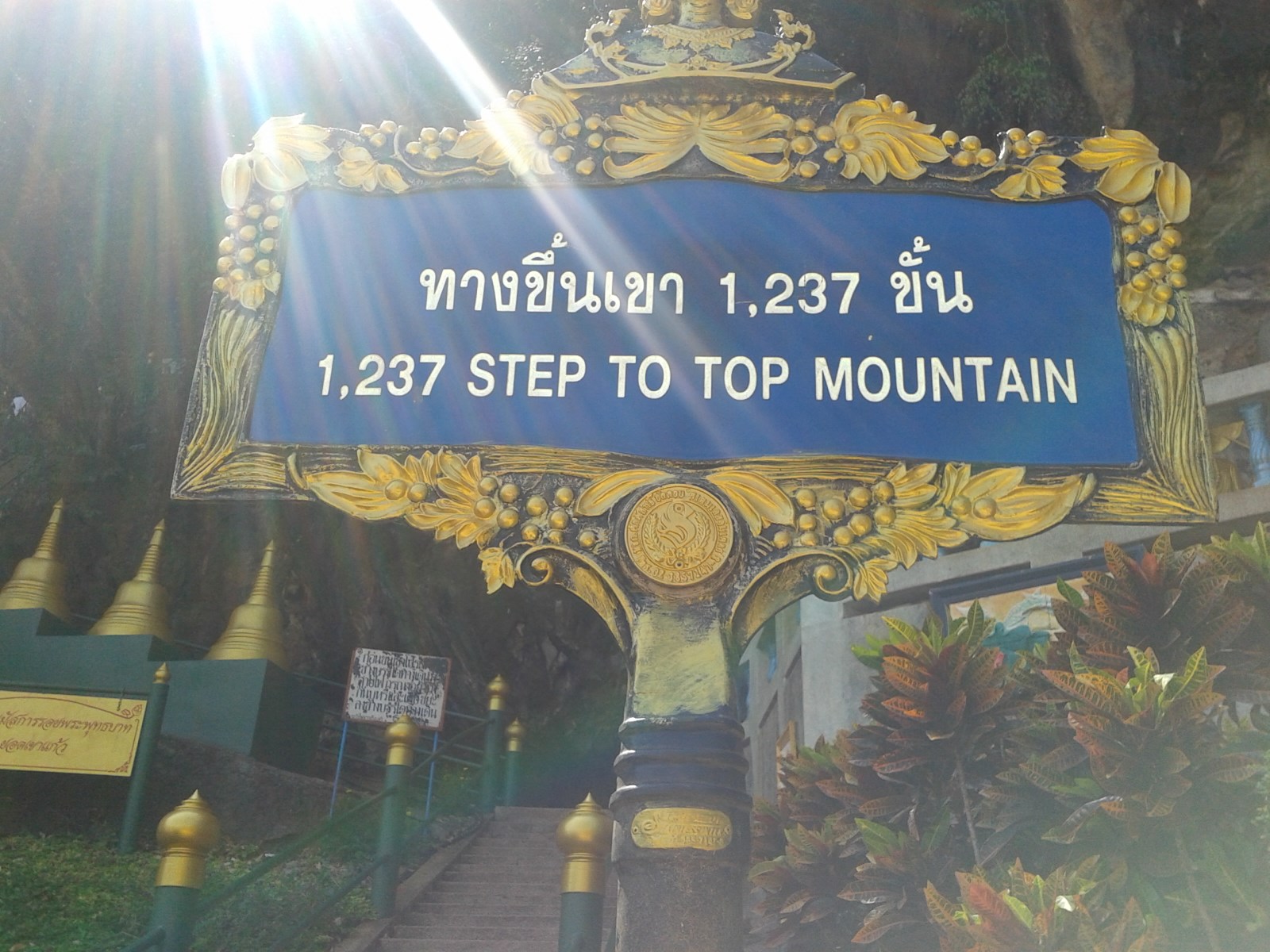
Sign, Wat Tham Suea, indicating the number of steps on the stairway to the top

Previously, the temple had one stairway with 1,237 steps leading to the summit (see photo). The stairs have been recently updated with a rebuilt section and now has 1,260 stairs leading to the summit. Some of the stair risers are more than a foot (30 cm) high. The top of the stairs is 278 meters' elevation. Elsewhere on the compound, 184 steps lead to the foothills area where monks live in the caves. Monkeys roam the lower stairs and temple grounds. Respect the monkeys and they will be disinterestedly hanging and resting in the stairs and in the jungle.

== Statues ==
At the top of the mountain there is a large golden Buddha statue. This statue, other temple buildings, and much of Krabi town can be seen from shrine at the top of the stairs.

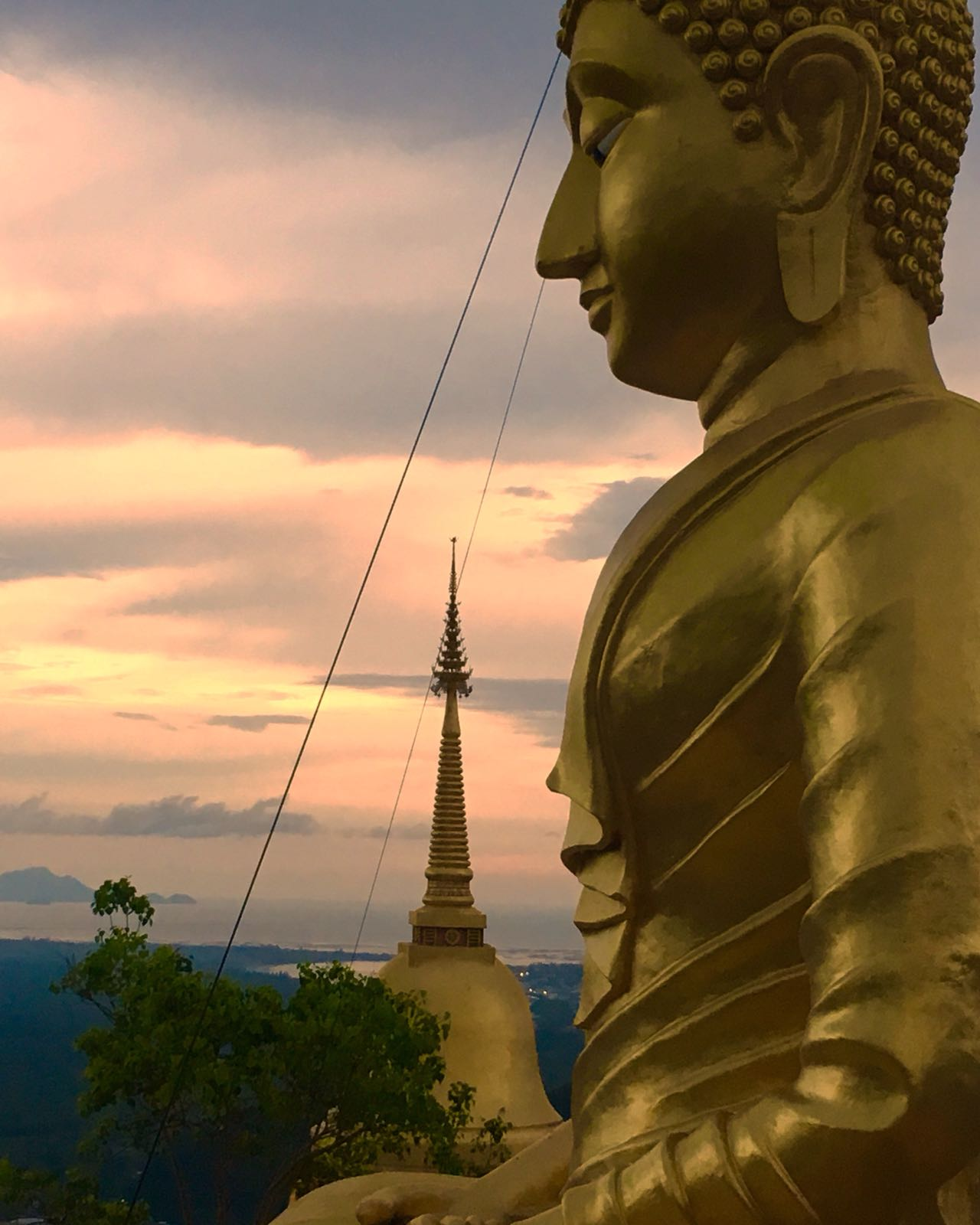
Sunset

== Gallery ==
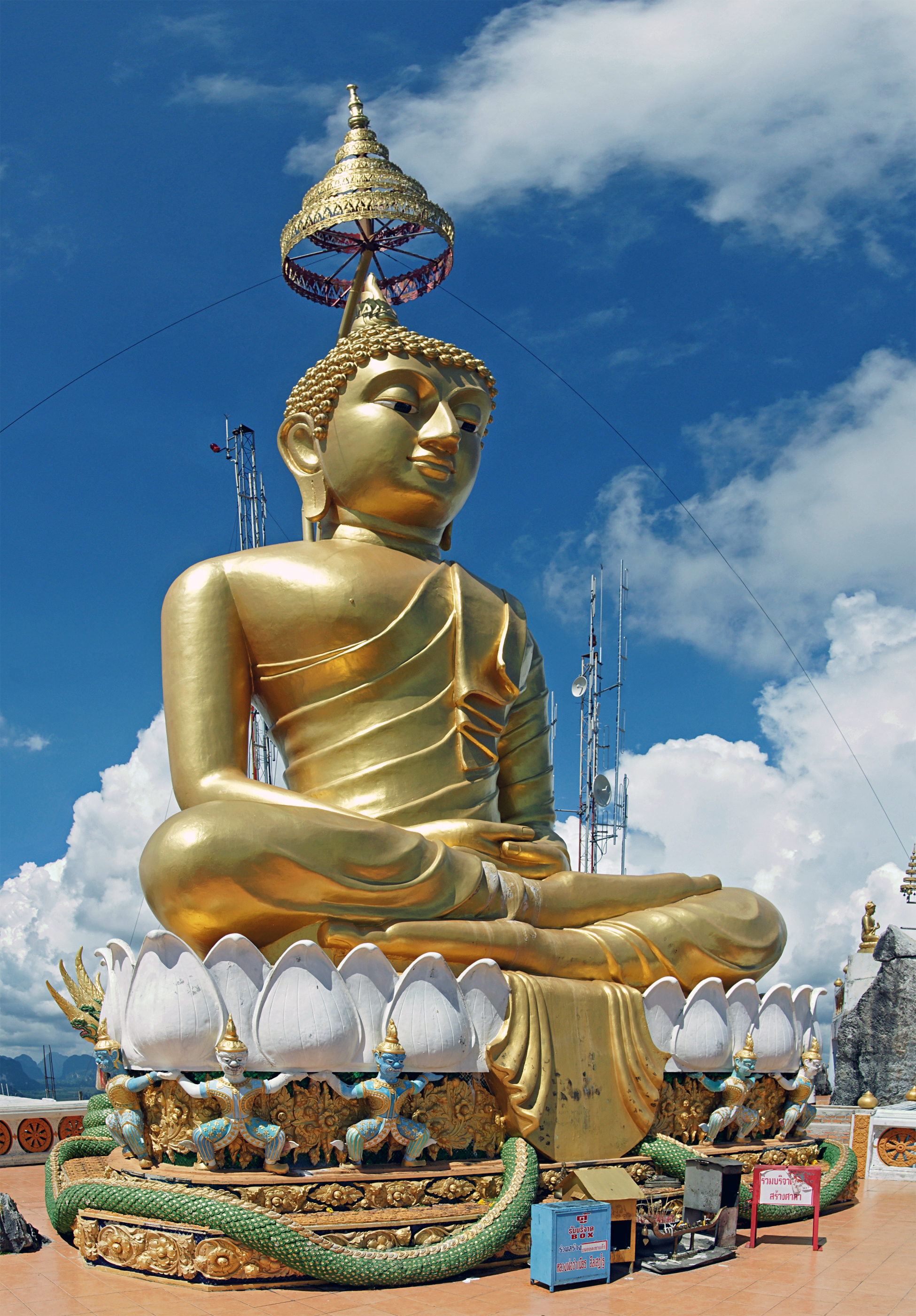
Statue at the top

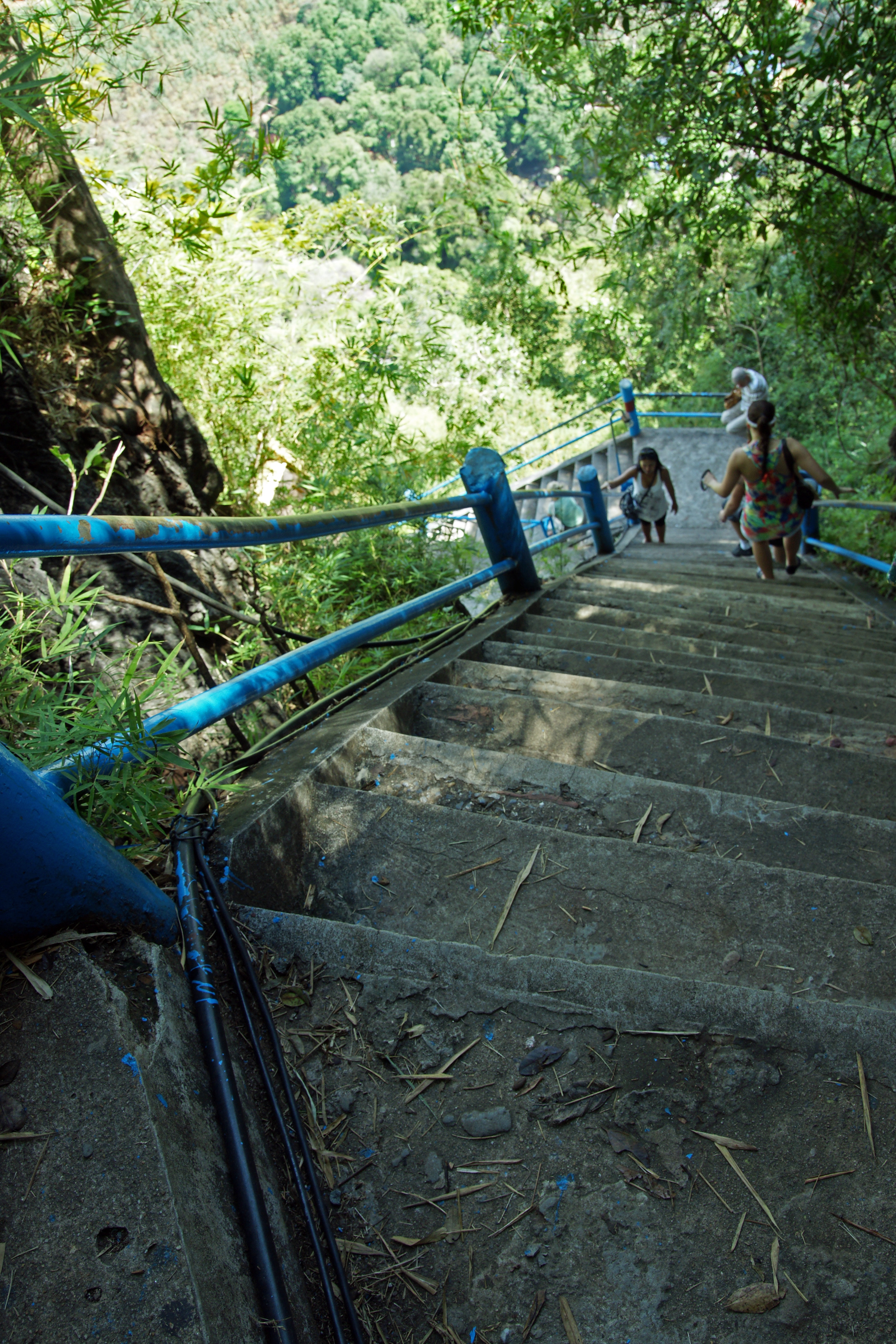
Stairs, Tiger Cave Temple

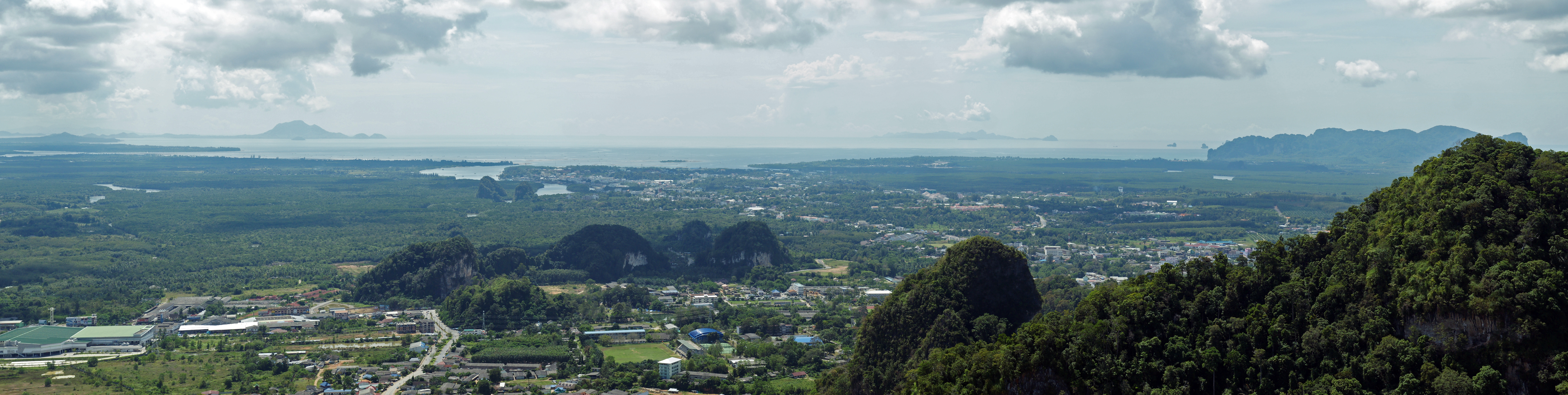
View of Krabi from Tiger Cave Temple
