= Krabi =

Coordinates: 8°3′33″N 98°55′8″E

Krabi กระบี่
- Town
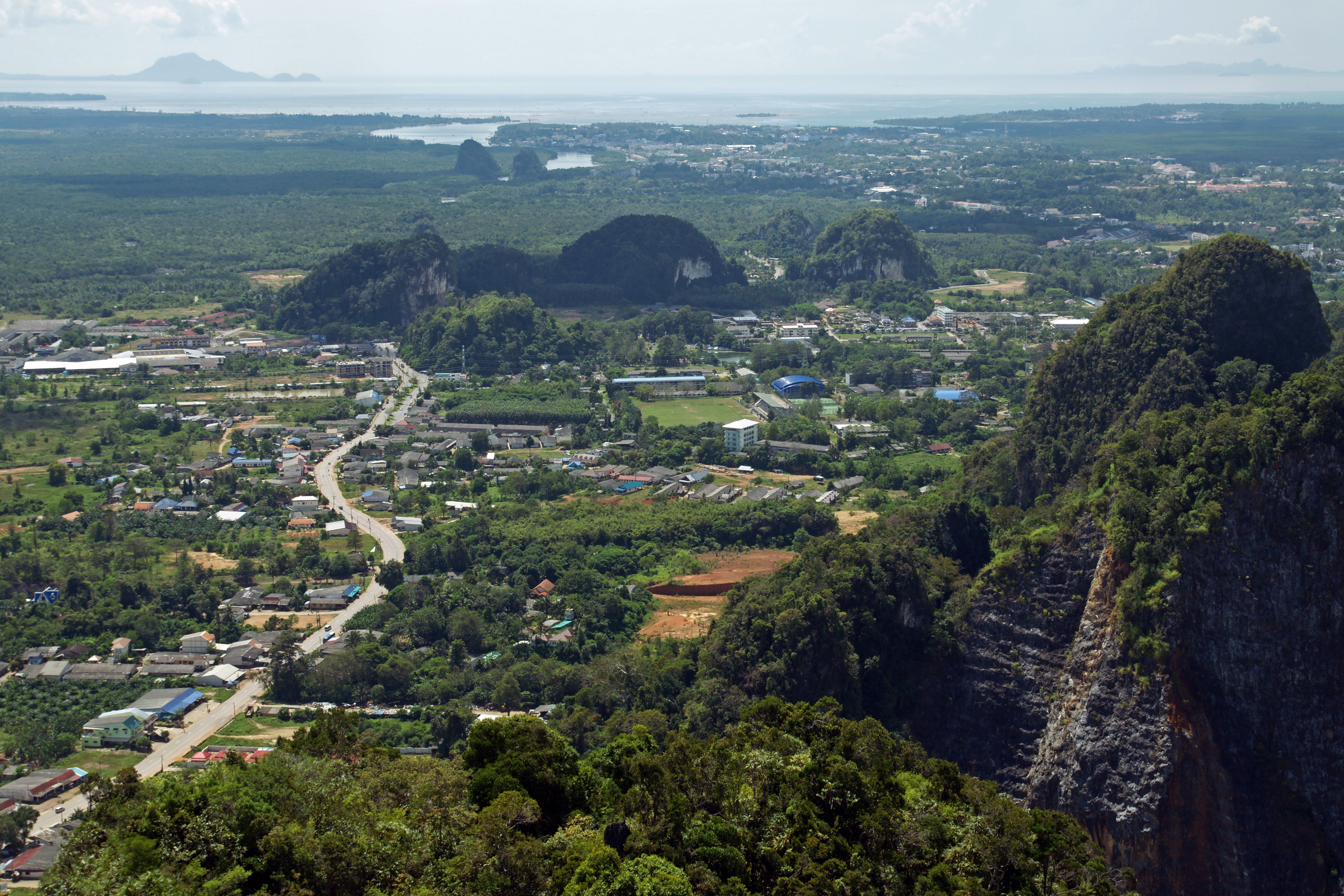

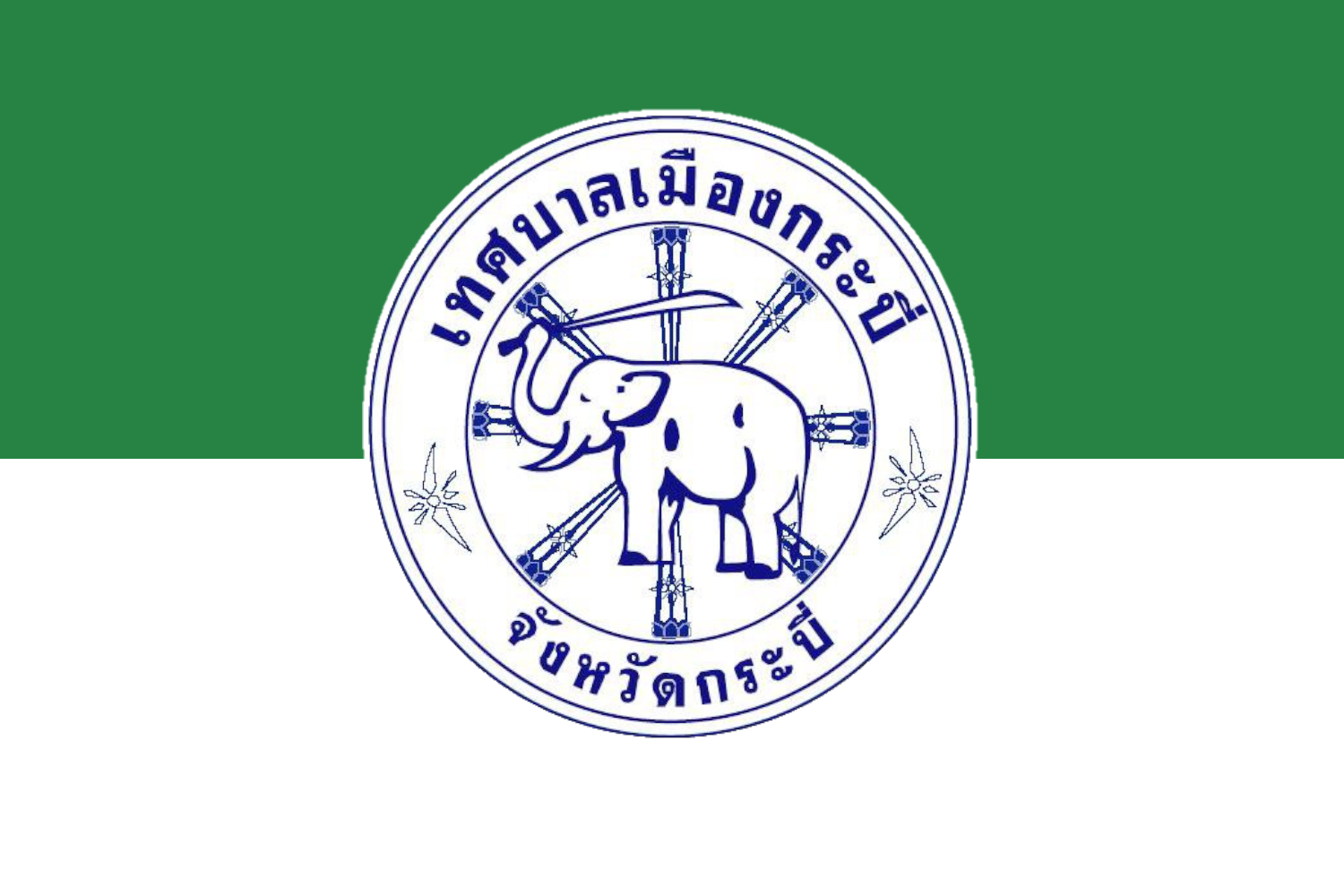
- Flag
- Interactive map of Krabi
- Country: Thailand
- Province: Krabi Province

Area
  - Land: 19 km^{2} (7.3 sq mi)

Population (2020)
  - Total: 32,644
- Time zone: UTC+7 (ICT)

Krabi (Thai: กระบี่, pronounced [krā.bìː]) is the capital of and main town in Krabi Province (thesaban mueang), on the west coast of southern Thailand, where the Krabi River flows into Phang Nga Bay. The town lies 650 km (400 mi) south of Bangkok, and as of 2020, has a population of 32,644. As in much of southern Thailand, the local economy centres largely on tourism.

== History ==
At the start of the Rattanakosin period in the late eighteenth century, when the capital was finally settled at Bangkok, an elephant kraal was established in Krabi by order of Chao Phraya Nakhon (Noi), the governor of Nakhon Si Thammarat, which was by then a part of the Thai Kingdom. He sent his vizier, the Phra Palad, to oversee this task, which was to ensure a regular supply of elephants for the larger town. So many followers immigrated in the steps of the Phra Palad that soon Krabi had a large community in three different boroughs: Pakasai, Khlong Pon, and Pak Lao. In 1872, King Chulalongkorn elevated these to town status, called Krabi, a word that preserves in its meaning the monkey symbolism of the old standard. The town's first governor was Luang Thep Sena, though it continued for a while as a dependency of Nakhon Si Thammarat. This was changed in 1875, when Krabi was raised to a fourth-level town in the old system of Thai government. Administrators then reported directly to the central government in Bangkok, and Krabi's history as an entity separate from other provinces had begun.

== Administration ==
The town covers the tambon Paknam and Krabi Yai of Krabi District, and is divided into 10 communities (chumchon).

== Climate ==
Facing the Andaman Sea, like Phuket, Krabi has a tropical monsoon climate, and is subject to a ten-month rainy season between March and December, often with sustained heavy rains for days at a time during the monsoons. Krabi's highest ever recorded temperature was 39.6 °C (103.3 °F) on 31 March 2023. Its lowest temperature was recorded on 11 January 2009: 15.3 °C (59.5 °F).

Climate data for Krabi (1981–2010, extremes 1994–2002, 2007–present)
Month	Jan	Feb	Mar	Apr	May	Jun	Jul	Aug	Sep	Oct	Nov	Dec	Year
Record high °C (°F)	36.3 (97.3)	38.2 (100.8)	39.6 (103.3)	40.0 (104.0)	38.9 (102.0)	35.0 (95.0)	34.5 (94.1)	35.1 (95.2)	35.9 (96.6)	36.8 (98.2)	37.0 (98.6)	37.2 (99.0)	40.0 (104.0)
Mean daily maximum °C (°F)	32.9 (91.2)	34.2 (93.6)	34.3 (93.7)	34.1 (93.4)	32.9 (91.2)	31.9 (89.4)	31.5 (88.7)	31.4 (88.5)	31.2 (88.2)	31.3 (88.3)	31.1 (88.0)	31.4 (88.5)	32.4 (90.3)
Daily mean °C (°F)	26.6 (79.9)	27.5 (81.5)	27.6 (81.7)	27.9 (82.2)	27.6 (81.7)	27.2 (81.0)	26.8 (80.2)	26.9 (80.4)	26.6 (79.9)	26.2 (79.2)	26.2 (79.2)	26.2 (79.2)	26.9 (80.4)
Mean daily minimum °C (°F)	21.6 (70.9)	22.0 (71.6)	23.0 (73.4)	23.6 (74.5)	23.7 (74.7)	23.3 (73.9)	23.0 (73.4)	22.9 (73.2)	22.9 (73.2)	22.4 (72.3)	22.5 (72.5)	21.7 (71.1)	22.7 (72.9)
Record low °C (°F)	15.3 (59.5)	15.7 (60.3)	18.0 (64.4)	19.5 (67.1)	19.2 (66.6)	19.0 (66.2)	18.2 (64.8)	18.0 (64.4)	19.0 (66.2)	18.6 (65.5)	17.7 (63.9)	18.0 (64.4)	15.3 (59.5)
Average rainfall mm (inches)	32.0 (1.26)	43.4 (1.71)	98.3 (3.87)	147.2 (5.80)	171.6 (6.76)	192.7 (7.59)	201.1 (7.92)	266.3 (10.48)	275.2 (10.83)	323.5 (12.74)	179.7 (7.07)	67.8 (2.67)	1,998.8 (78.69)
Average rainy days	5.3	4.5	8.7	11.7	15.9	15.8	18.3	18.0	18.5	21.5	17.6	10.1	165.9
Average relative humidity (%)	77	73	79	82	85	86	87	85	87	88	86	83	83
Mean monthly sunshine hours	198.4	214.7	201.5	183.0	155.0	150.0	155.0	151.9	144.0	108.5	138.0	179.8	1,979.8
Mean daily sunshine hours	6.4	7.6	6.5	6.1	5.0	5.0	5.0	4.9	4.8	3.5	4.6	5.8	5.4
Source 1: Thai Meteorological Department
Source 2: Office of Water Management and Hydrology, Royal Irrigation Department (sun and humidity)

== Demographics ==
Since 2005, the population of Krabi has been greatly increasing.

Estimation date	31 Dec 2005	31 Dec 2010	31 Dec 2015	31 Dec 2019
Population	24,986	27,333	31,378	32,644

== Tourism ==
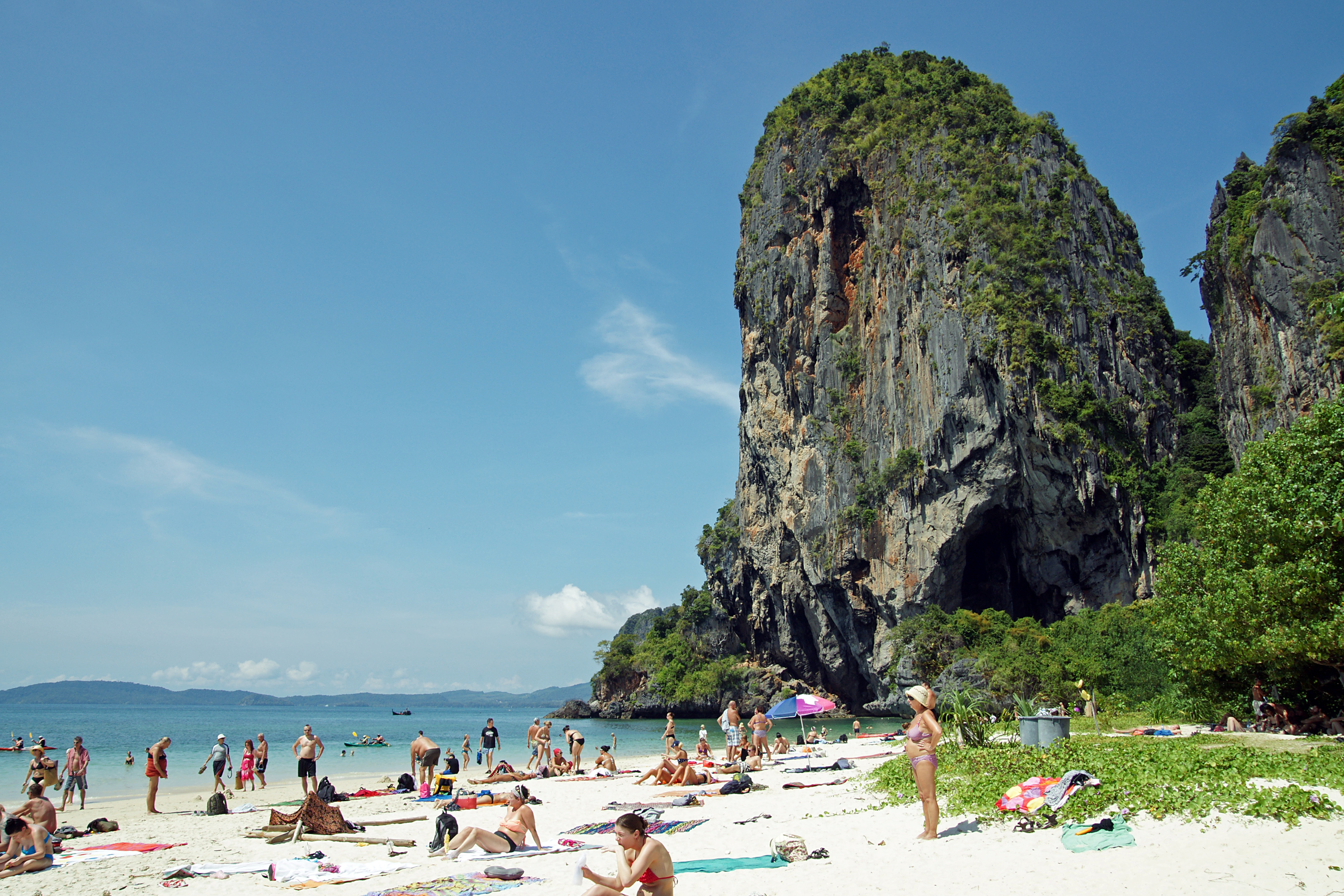
Phra Nang Beach covered with tourists.

Much of the province has been given over to several national parks. Top destinations are Hat Noppharat Thara - Mu Ko Phi Phi National Park, Ao Nang, Railay, and Ko Phi Phi. The province includes over 80 smaller islands such as Ko Lanta and Phi Phi, well known to adventurers, yachtsmen, scuba-divers, snorkelers, and day-trippers from Phuket. Krabi's beaches attract both native Thai people and foreigners alike.

Ko Lanta National Park, also in Krabi Province, includes several coral-fringed islands with well-known diving sites. The largest island, Ko Lanta Yai, is the site of park headquarters, and is also home to "Chao Le", or sea gypsies, who sustain themselves largely through fishing. The islands are best visited during the drier months of October through April.

Kayaking, sailing, bird watching, snorkeling are also among top activities. In the interior, two predominantly mainland national parks, Khao Phanom Bencha National Park and Than Bokkhorani, offer inland scenic attractions including waterfalls and caves, and opportunities for trekking, bird watching, and eco-tours.

The rock faces at Railay Beach near Ao Nang have attracted climbers from all over the world and each year are the venue for the Rock and Fire Festival in mid April. There are several rock climbing schools at Railay Beach. The rock is limestone and has characteristic pockets, overhangs and faces. Railay has numerous multi-pitch areas most of which start from the beach itself. A famous example is "Humanality". In addition, deep water soloing is popular on the numerous nearby rocky islands accessible by long-tail boat. Another popular destination is the Fossil Shell Beach located at Ban Laem Pho. The beach is famous for its fossilized snail shells, dwellers of the freshwater swamp that covered this area some 40 million years ago.

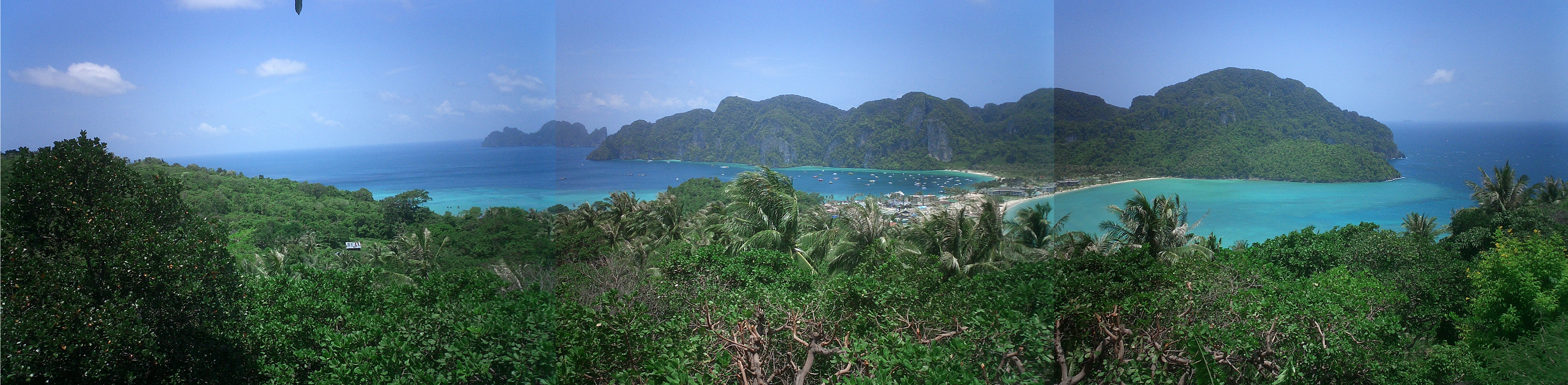
The Ko Phi Phi Don is the largest of the islands in the Ko Phi Phi archipelago
Ko Phi Phi Le
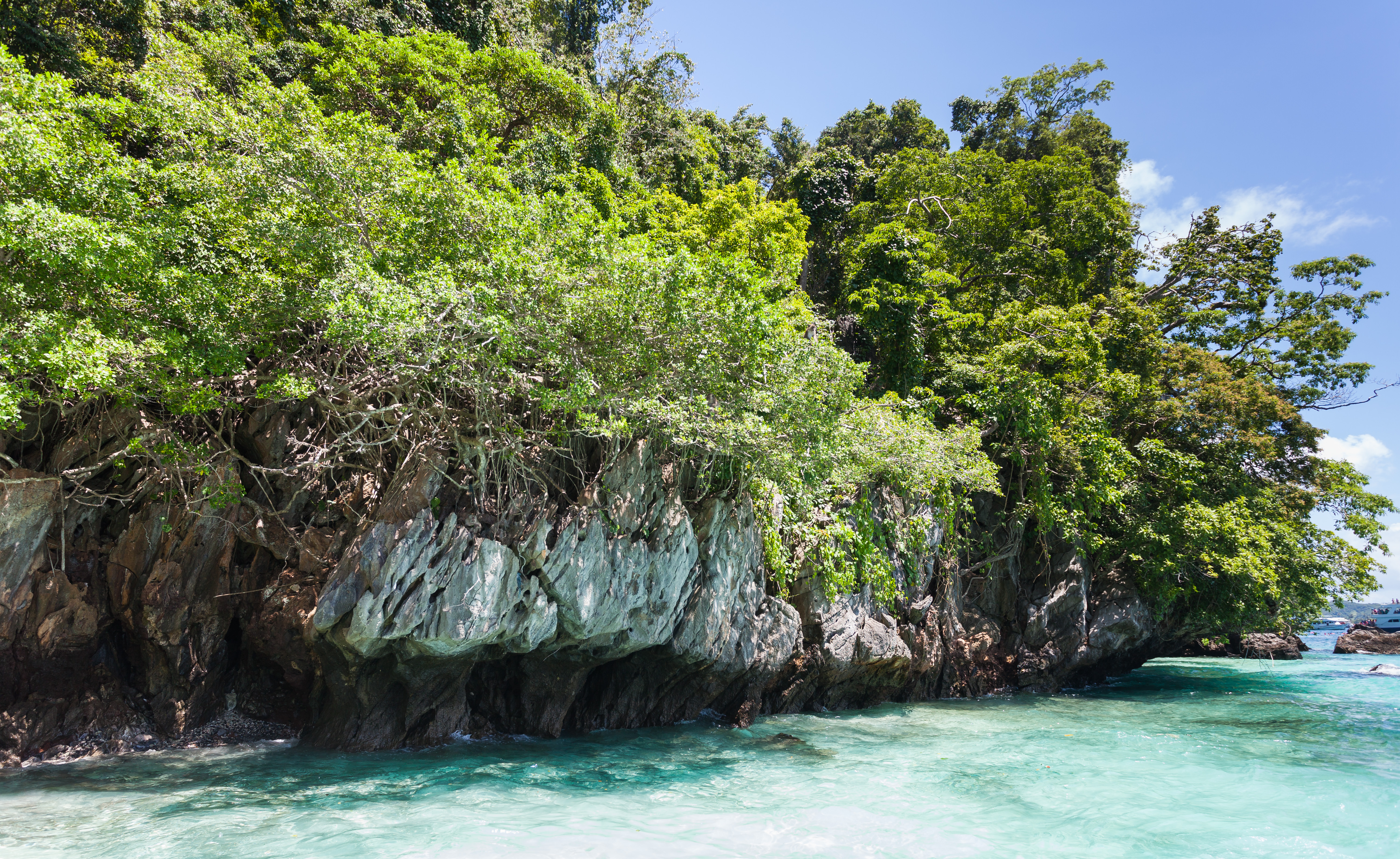

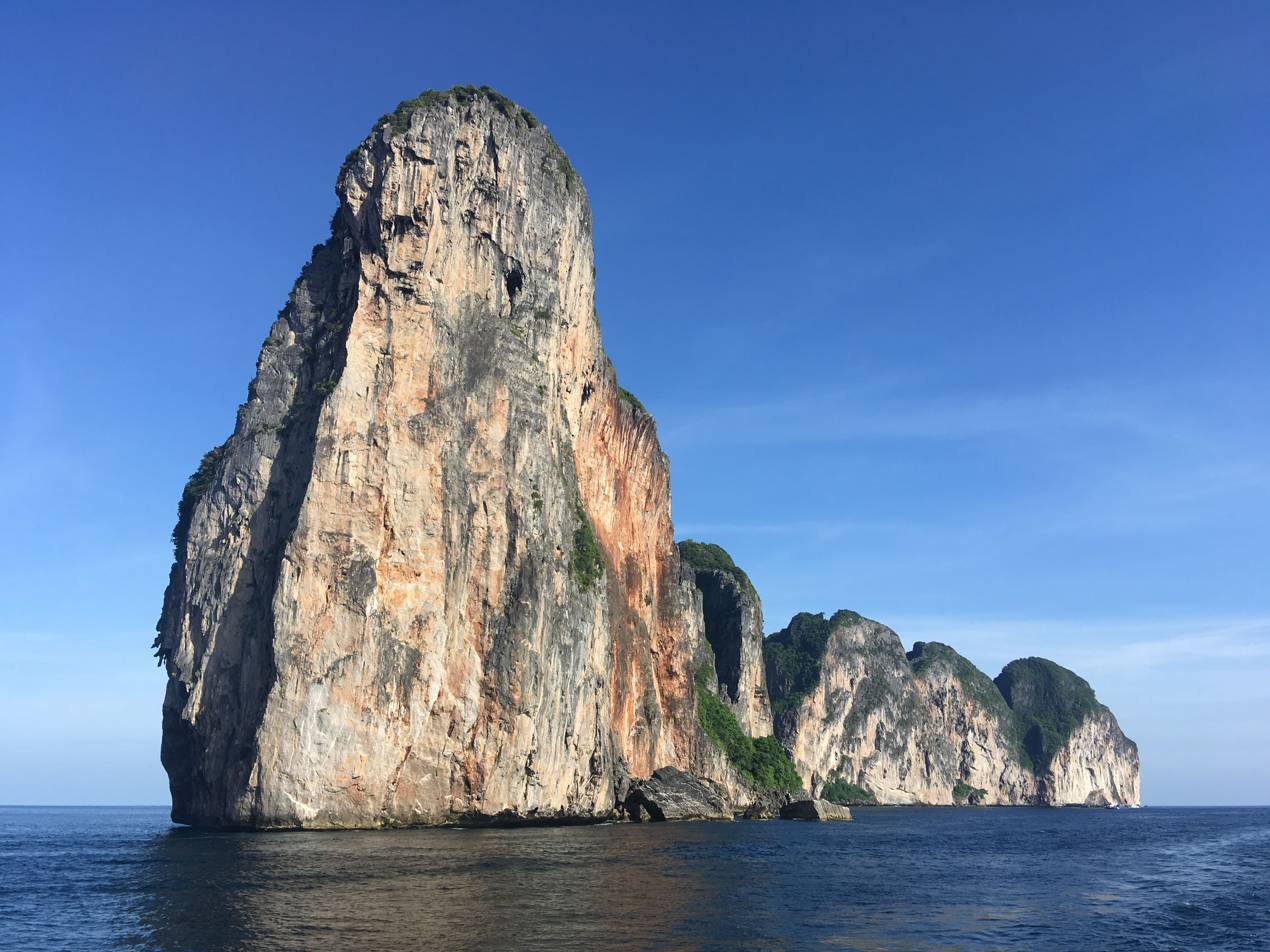
View of the northern part of Ko Phi Phi Le

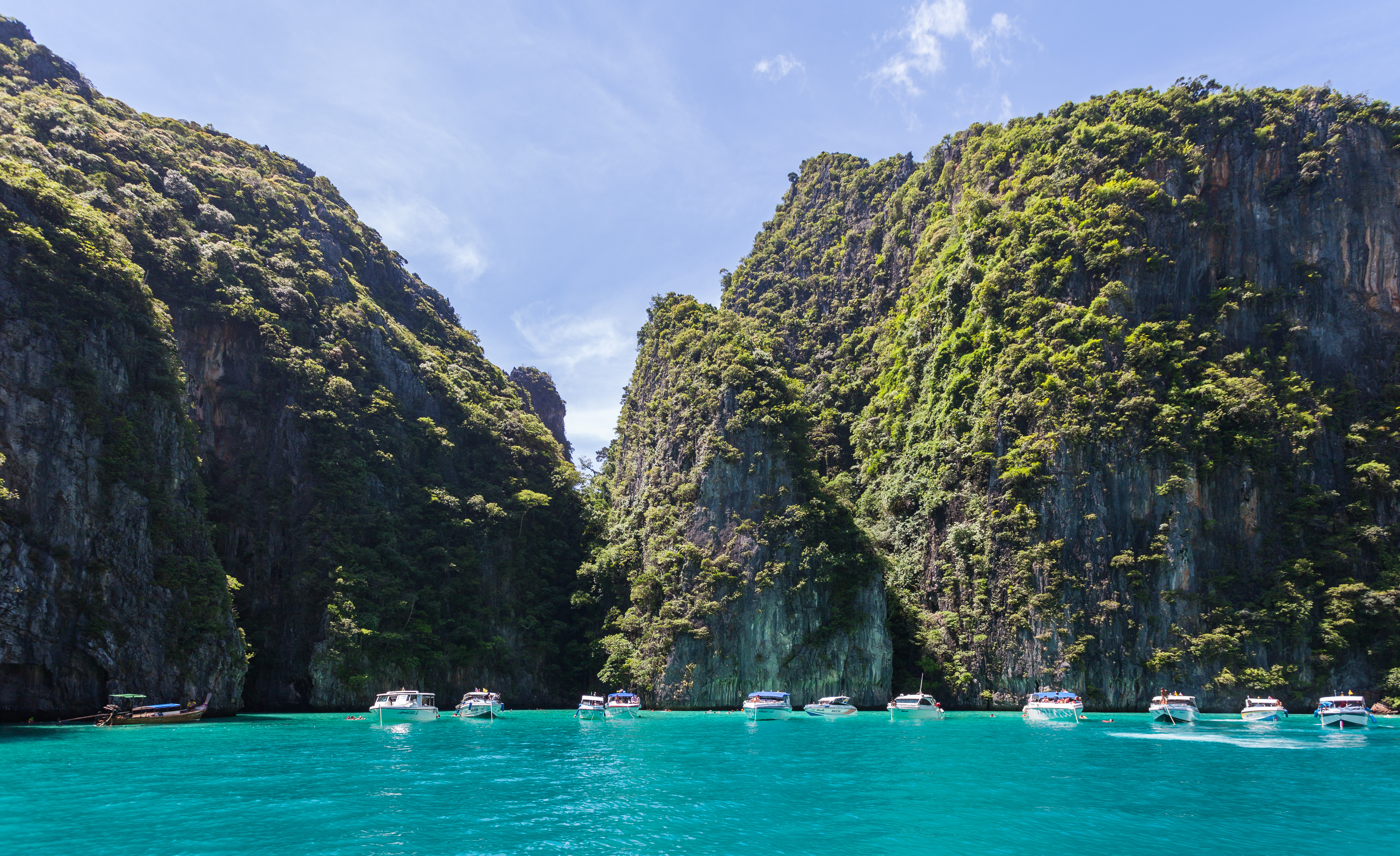
Phi Phi Le Island

== Transport ==
Since 1999, the town has been served by the international Krabi Airport. Passing through the town is Phetkasem Road (Thailand Route 4).

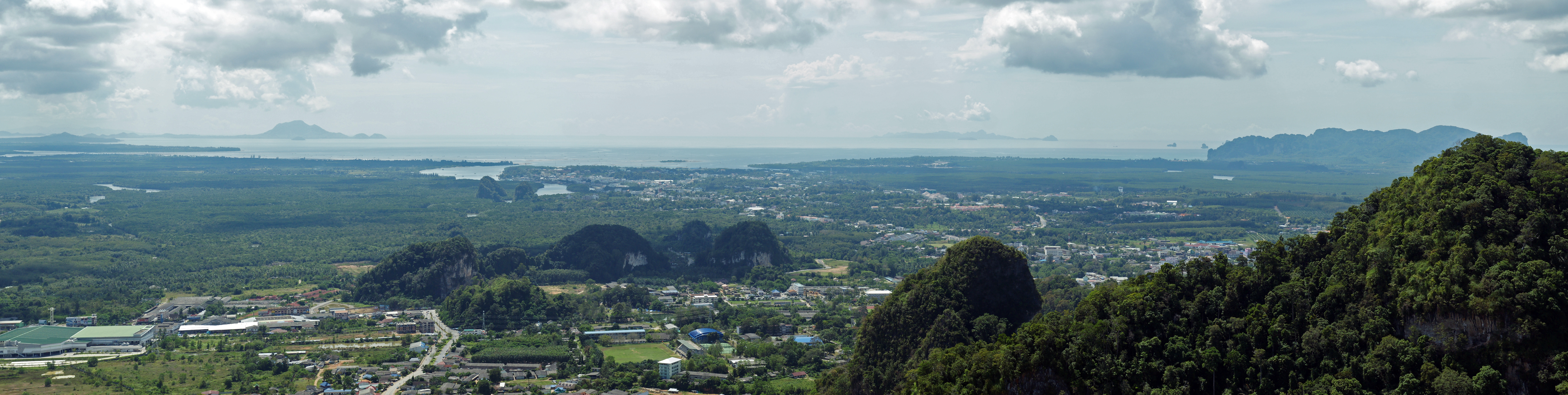
Panoramic view of Krabi from Tiger Cave Temple.
