= Jebel Dahar =

Low sandstone mountain chain of the Médenine Governorate of Tunisia

- Location within Tunisia

Highest point
- Peak: Djebel Zemertène
- Elevation: 713 m (2,339 ft)
- Coordinates: 33°23′30″N 10°08′00″E

Geography
- Country: Tunisia
- Region: Médenine Governorate

Jebel Dahar (French: Djebel Dahar) is a low sandstone mountain chain of the Médenine Governorate of Tunisia.

== Geography ==
The chain is oriented on a north-south axis, bisecting the south of Tunisia. At the northern end, it meets the east-west-oriented Jebel Tebaga. The Sahara lies to the south and west of it, and the fertile Jeffara plain to the east. It runs for over 100 kilometres (62 mi) south from Matmata, curving gently to the east to sink beneath the dunes of the Grand Erg Oriental near Tataouine. Foothills extend for a further 100 kilometres (62 mi) to the border with Libya, beyond which the chain continues as the Nafusa Mountains.

The peaks of Jebel Dahar are lower than those of the Dorsale and Atlas chains. The tallest is Djebel Zemertène, at 713 metres (2,339 ft). However, they are imposing in form: most are steep-sided mesas, separated by either narrow ravines or wide valleys.

== Climate and vegetation ==
The local climate is extremely arid with frequent wind. The temperature often falls below 0 °C (32 °F) at night during the winter, and rises as high as 45 °C (113 °F) during the day in summer. There are approximately 15–20 days of precipitation a year, primarily in winter and in the form of localised showers. There is little vegetation, consisting of lucerne, thorn bushes, and the occasional palm tree, giving the landscape a lunar appearance.

== Settlement and agriculture ==
Jebel Dahar has been inhabited for thousands of years by various Berber tribes, who farm the mountain slopes on terraced fields to retain runoff water from the rare rainfall. This is called the jessour system after the native word jessr and uses earth and rock dykes to define the terraces and hold water, with spillways to divert excess to a terrace below. Olive and fruit trees and vegetables are cultivated. A number of jessour fields can be seen around Matmata.

The mountains have served as a refuge for the Berbers of the plains following the Hilalian invasions of the 11th century. They built fortified villages (ksars) and cave dwellings to adapt to the harsh climate and for defence.

=== Cave dwellings ===
Jebel Dahar is known for its cave dwellings. These are excavated in two forms: dugouts and tunnels into the mountainside.

For a dugout dwelling, a shaft 5–9 metres (16–30 ft) deep and up to 12 metres (39 ft) in diameter is sunk, from the bottom of which horizontal tunnels radiate to serve as rooms; the openings to these are uncovered or covered only by a carpet. Shelves, racks, benches and beds are cut out of the walls. Sometimes further rooms are created which are reached by means of a rope and steps cut in the wall; these are used for storage and traditionally for the first week after a couple's marriage. A tunnel is dug from the inside to form an exit, with a slight downwards incline so that any rain water can run out of the dwelling. These exit tunnels are usually winding and have niches for stabling animals. The exit door is usually decorated with traditional symbols such as the hand of Fatima or a fish, and is often concealed between rocks and bushes. There is sometimes a nomads' tent and a shelter for animals nearby.

The more common and widespread type of cave dwelling is constructed by boring a tunnel into the side of the mountain; softer stone is excavated to form rooms, with the tailings sometimes being used in walls or terrace dykes, and the harder rock left in place to form ceilings and floors. Often several such tunnels are stacked one above the other, topped by a structure used for storage and defence.

The cave dwellings are well adapted to the climate, remaining cool in summer and retaining warmth in winter, and it is disputed how far they should be regarded as defensive as opposed to purely practical. Some have been equipped with electricity and running water. Nonetheless, few families remain in them. The majority, especially younger people, have moved into the new blocks of flats in urban areas, which are sometimes unpleasantly cold in winter and require air conditioning in summer, but offer electric stoves, washing machines, and other modern comforts. The ancient settlement of Matmata is thus increasingly being deserted in favour of Nouvelle (New) Matmata, 15 kilometres (9.3 mi) away. In addition to Matmata, some cave dwellers remain in Beni Aïssa und Beni Métir, approximately 10 to 20 kilometres (6.2 to 12.4 mi) away.

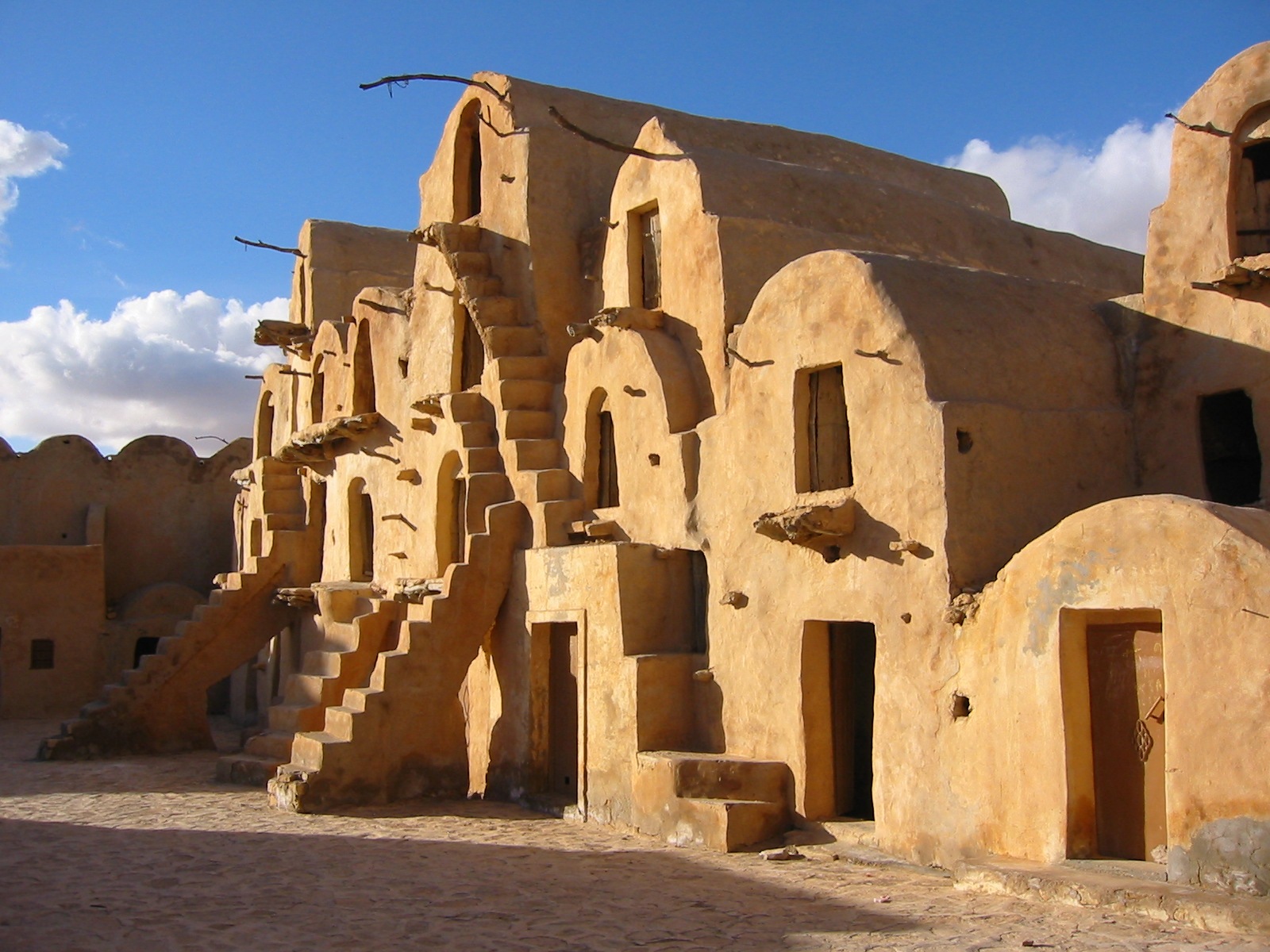
Ksar Ouled Soltane

=== Fortified settlements ===
As in all of south Tunisia, an alternative traditional building type is the ksar (plural ksour), an assemblage of usually multi-storey barrel-shaped storage buildings enclosing a rectangular courtyard, with the doors opening inwards so that the outside walls form a defence. These were used by the semi-nomadic Berbers to store their possessions together with grain, oil and animal feed. Generally a single watchman and his family, together with the aged and children, remained there while the remainder of the tribe moved around. In Jebel Dahar, they were often built on steep crags for additional defence; those on the plain are believed to have been constructed in relatively peaceful periods.

== Tourism ==
The largest number of ksour and the best examples are found around Tataouine, where there is a "route of the ksour" comparable to the "route of the kasbahs" in southern Morocco. The best preserved and most attractive ksar is in Chenini, approximately 20 kilometres (12 mi) west of Tataouine. Near there are Douiret, where there is the only underground mosque in The Dahar Region (at least 2 other subterranean mosques are on Djerba Island, one restored and functioning, all open to visits from non-Muslims); impressive storage buildings at Guermessa und Ksar Hadada; and Ksar Ouled Soltane, south of Tataouine.

The remaining cave dwellers have responded to increasing numbers of tourists by charging visitors to tour and take photographs of their homes, with what has been called "latent aggressiveness that is only too understandable in view of the hordes of tourists who invade their living spaces and privacy without respect".

Tourists are also increasingly drawn to the stark landscape for the effects of the light, particularly at sunrise and sunset. Many make daytrips from Djerba or Zarzis, and tours of Tunisia usually include a side trip to the mountains.

Jebel Dahar has also become internationally known as a site of filming in 1977 for Star Wars (near Matmata) and in 2000 for Star Wars: Episode II – Attack of the Clones. Local people were employed as cheap extras.
