= Daghaghra =

Ouderna fraction tribe of Ouled Slim from Ouerghemma confederation

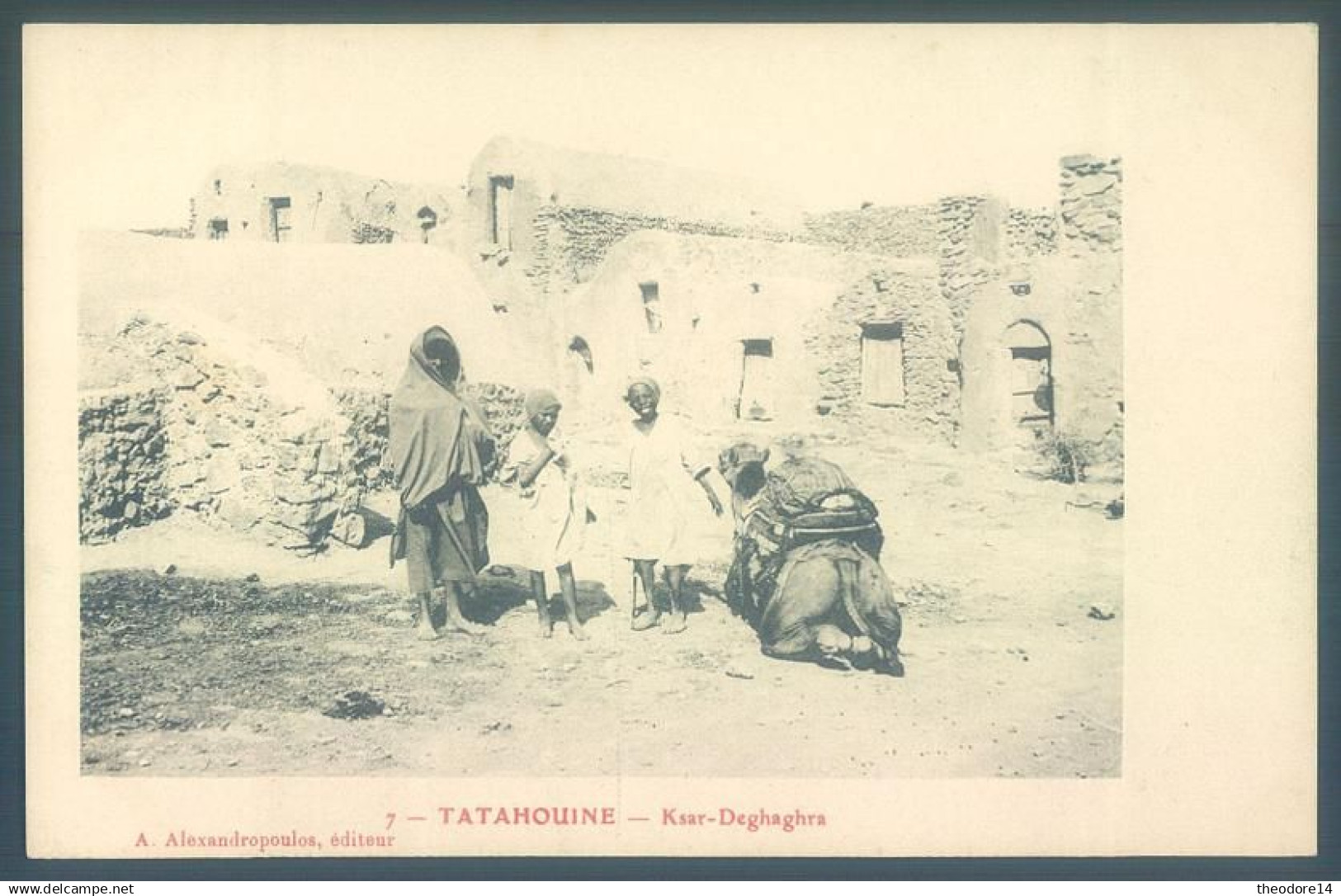
- Postal card of the Daghaghra's ksar
- Ethnicity: Ouerghemma
- Nisba: ad-Daghari
- Location: Tataouine, Tunisia
- Parent tribe: Ouled Selim of Ouderna
- Language: Tamazight, Arabic
- Religion: Sunni Islam

The Daghaghra, also spelled Deghaghra or Deghagha, are an tribe belonging to the Ouled Slim fraction of the Ouderna tribe in the region of Tataouine, southern Tunisia.

== Origins ==
The Daghaghra originate from the Ouled Slim fraction of the Ouderna tribe. They are a Bedouin tribe from the Bani Sulaym confederation, like many historian said, like Mohamed Bouzerara, a Tunisian historian from Tataouine. A legend tells that during the flight of the Ouled Yacoub, a woman from this tribe abandoned her child. The child was found by a man from the Ouled-Debbab, who entrusted him to his wife, who raised him as her own. When he became an adult, he worked as a laborer in a Berber village to earn a living and took a wife from the neighboring Aouadid tribe. This woman, while pregnant, asked her father for a piece of ox hide. She cut it into strips and demanded the land covered by these strips. Her father exclaimed, "Daghaghretni, you have deceived me!"; this is said to be the origin of the tribe's name.

== Etymology ==
Mentioned under the name "Dghrara" in medieval sources, "Ghrara" means goat hair in the Berber language of the region.

== History ==
Descended from the Ouled-Selim, along with the other clans that contributed to this fraction (Ouled-Debbab, Ouled-Chehida and Adjerda), they lived around the ksar of Guettoufa and had arable land, both located in the territory of the Ouled-Abd-el-Hamid, another fraction of the Ouderna. André Louis described them as lords due to their nomadic status, while sedentary people were described as serfs of the Bedouins. As members of the Ouderna confederation, the Daghaghra and other allied tribes were described at the beginning of the 20th century as great nomadic raiders much feared by their neighbors, before being sedentarized and becoming herders and farmers described as peaceful. The ksour among the Daghaghra are not living spaces like those of other tribes in the region, due to their nomadic and semi-nomadic lifestyle depending on the period. Instead, they serve only as warehouses, bearing the name of the tribe (explaining the origin of the Ksar Dghaghra), where food resources or other wealth are stored. Among tribes, these ksours (plural of ksar) were once a way to display power—the more one possessed, the greater their influence. The Daghaghra had six: Ksar Dghaghra, Ksar Ouled Abd'Allah, Ksar Bouziri, Ksar el-Mraa, Ksar Bhir, and Ksar Namous. The Daghaghra mounted strong resistance that made colonization difficult for the French administration. The Daghariyoun were led by the chief Mabrouk ben Ali ad-Daghari, partly because a portion of their territory was seized to establish a market controlled by the same administration. The ksar Bouziri, which Abdesmad Zaïed classifies among the "ancient Berber hilltop villages", is located at the foot of a hill in a defensive position and is not easily visible from afar. According to Zaïed, it is very old, while Kamel Laroussi dates its foundation back to the 18th century. On January 10, 2020, the Tunisian government proposed the site for future inclusion on the UNESCO World Heritage List.The Ksar was founded by a certain Bou Ziri, a name meaning "Moon" in the Berber language.

== Inter-tribal relationships ==
=== With Berber cheikhdoms of Sedra and Tazardanet ===
The Sedra and Tazardanet are little Berber tribes (known as a cheikhdoms) who were allies of Bedouin arab tribes who owned the lands, the Sedra were allies of the Daghaghra and Tazardanet of Ouled Chahida. The sedentary berbers cultivated and inhabited the land in exchange of the bedouin tribes who had the quality of warriors in the region.

== Subdivisions ==
The tribe consists of three sub-fractions, spread across several villages or encampments:

- Rakhaïsa
- Makaraa
- Ouled Abdallah

Each is composed of several smaller sub-tribes.

== Notable people ==
- Ahmed ben Amor Larbi, sheikh of the Daghaghra
- Ali ben Mabrouk, chaouch of the Oulad Abdallah
- Mohamed Bourkhis al-Daghari, poet of the Daghaghra
