= Ghorfa =

Vaulted room used by Berbers for storing grain

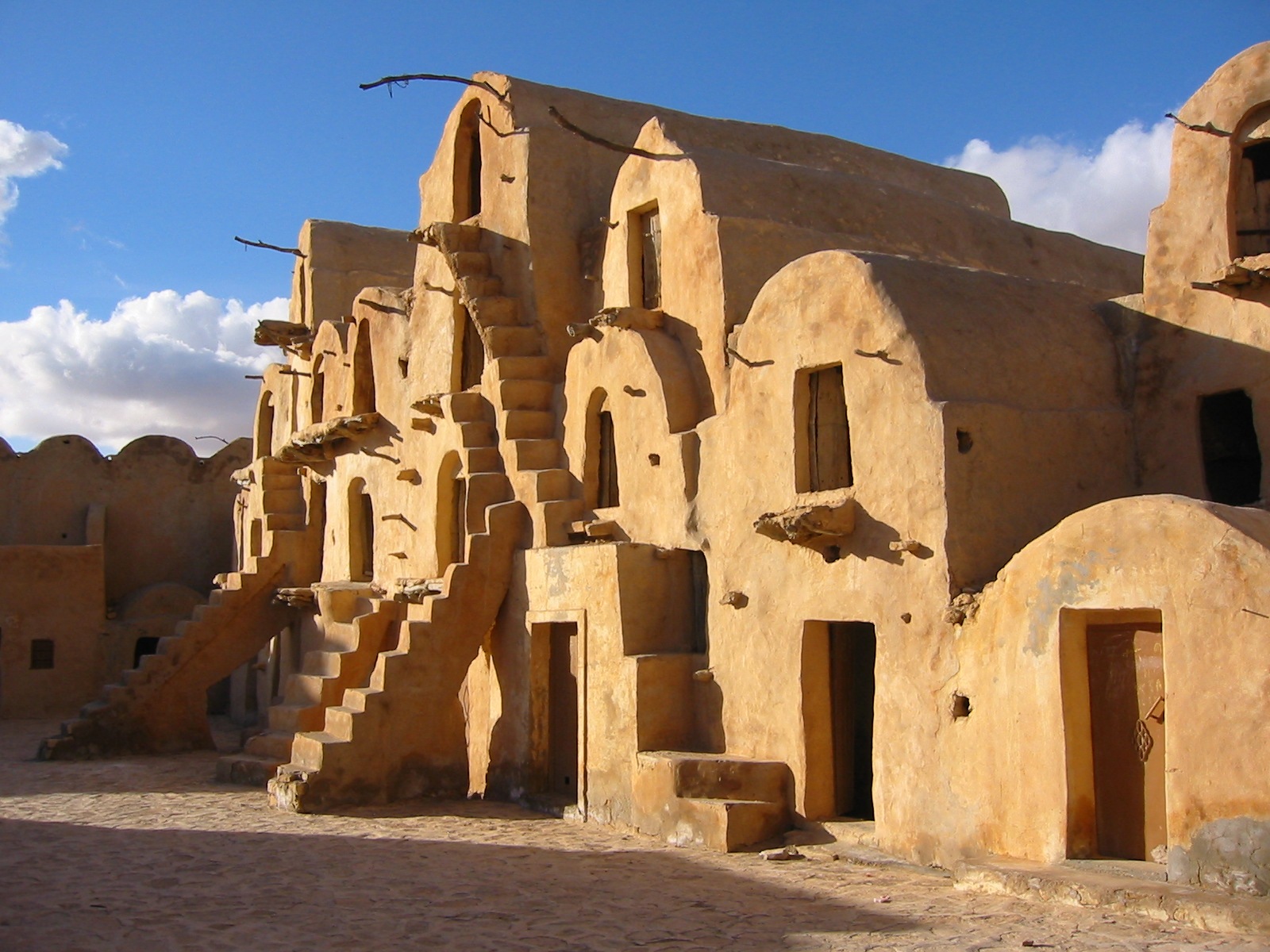
Multi-level ghorfas, as seen at Ksar Ouled Soltane in southern Tunisia

A ghorfa (Arabic: غرفة, lit. 'room') is a type of communal granary found mainly in southern Tunisia. Similar structures are also found in northeastern Libya. They are associated in particular with Berber settlements in these regions. They consist of a collection of vaulted rooms built in rows and stacked in multiple stories organized around an internal courtyard.

== Terminology ==
The Arabic word ghorfa (غرفة) refers in a more narrow sense to the individual rooms of the granary. The granary as a whole can also be known as a ksar (pl. ksour), the term used for fortified villages in the region. Some similar fortified granaries in Tunisia are referred to by the term kasbah.

== Historical background ==
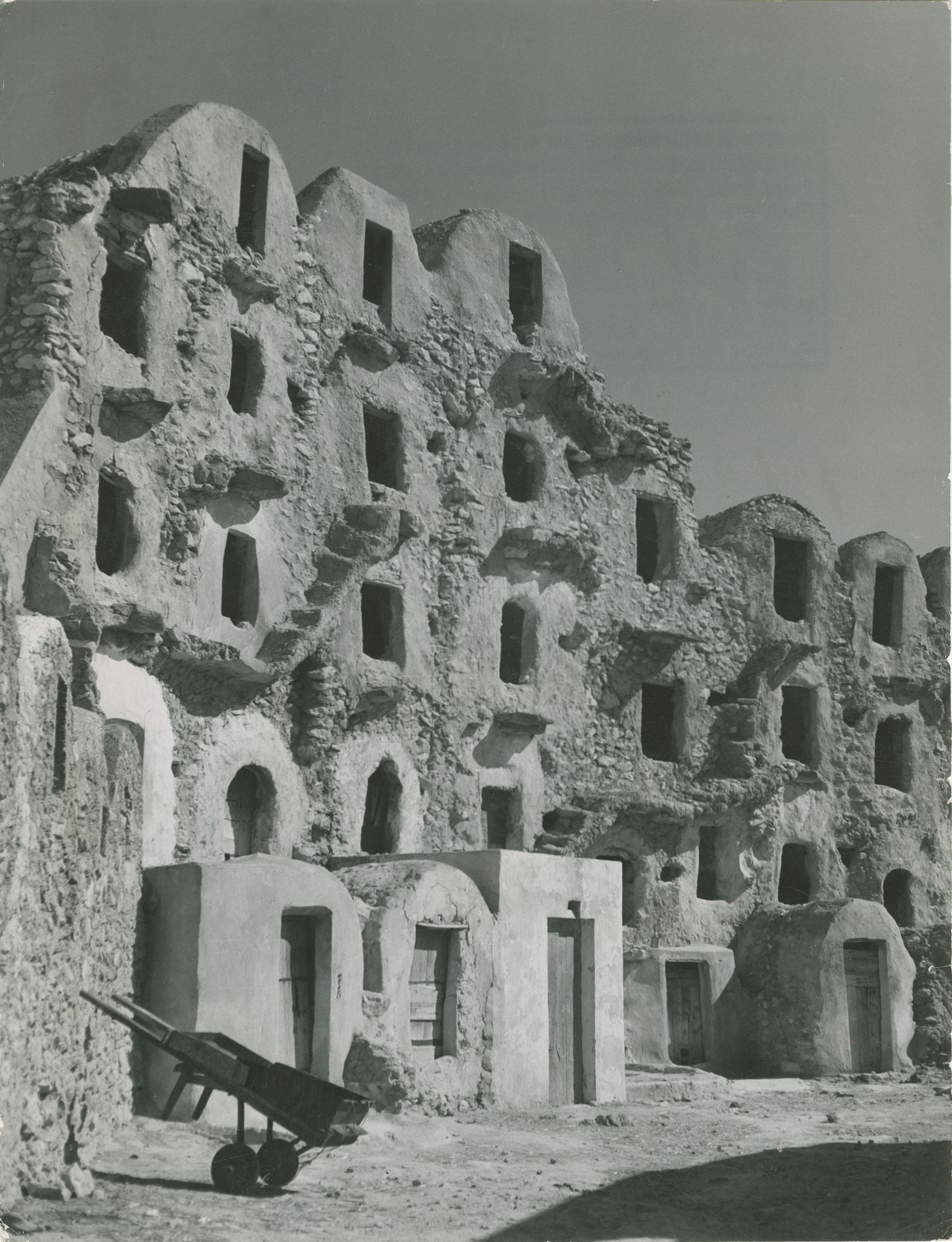
Ksar of Medenine, southern Tunisia, in 1957

The formation of the collective granaries in southern Tunisia and the Nafusa Mountains of Libya can be attributed generally to the 14th century. In more recent centuries, the number of ksour in southern Tunisia increased as local lifestyles became more uniform. At one time, some 6000 ghorfas existed in Tunisia. A large proportion of these have disappeared since Tunisian independence in the 20th century, as the rural economy in the region declined. In the Nafusa Mountains, most of the ksour were destroyed in the 19th century when the Ottomans suppressed a rebellion in the area.

== Architecture ==
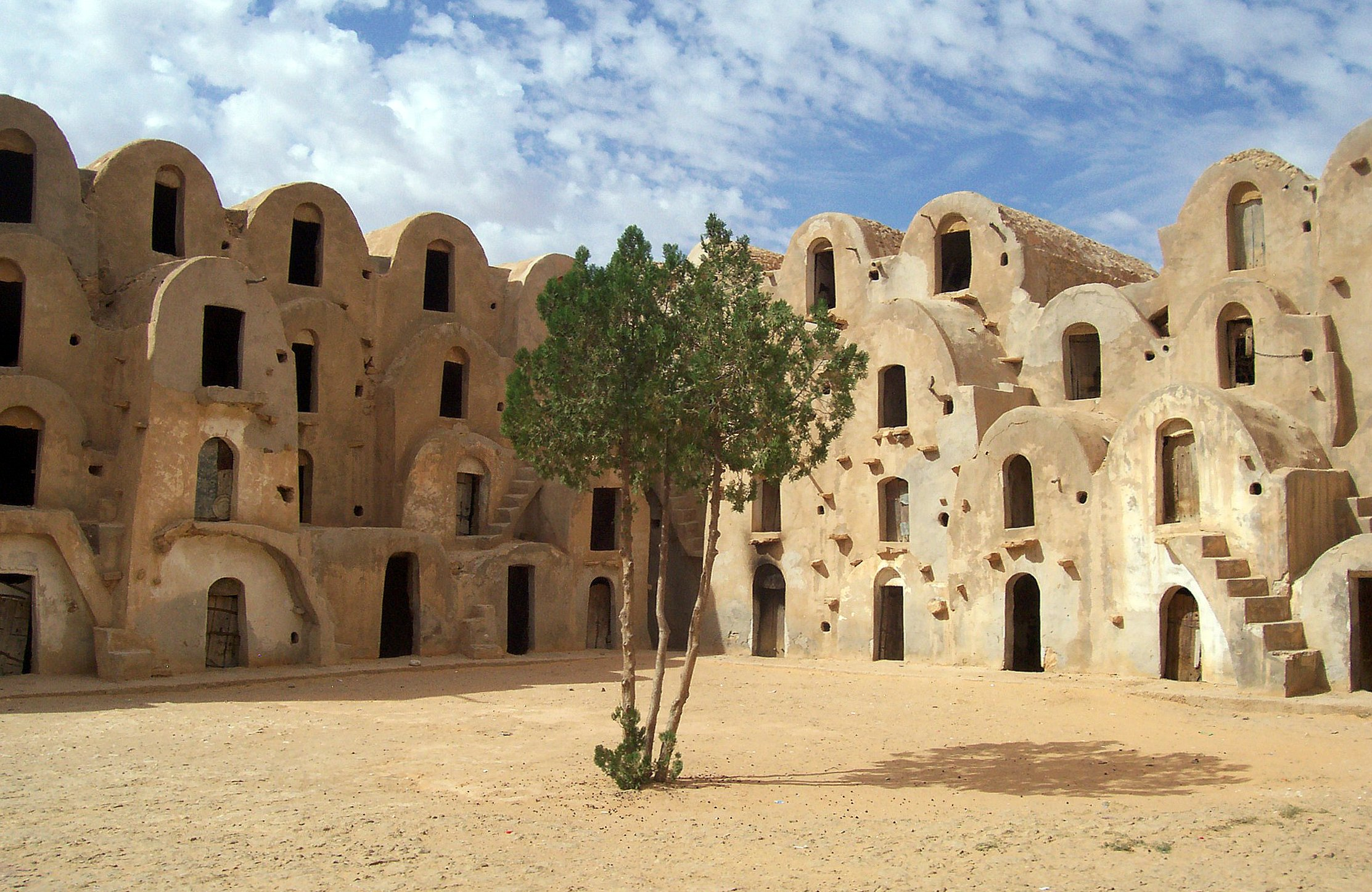
Interior of Ksar Ez Zahra in southern Tunisia

Ghorfa-type granaries consist of a series of barrel-vaulted rooms, each with a single door, built in rows and stacked on top of each other to form multiple stories. These are organized around an internal courtyard, usually quadrilateral in shape, from which the rooms are accessed. The tallest granaries can be up to four or five stories high. The rooms were used to store grain, dates, and other food or animal products. The rooms at the ground level could also be used as living quarters for guards and animals. The rooms above ground level are accessed by external staircases. Many of these structures were built using loose stones and clay.

== Notable examples ==
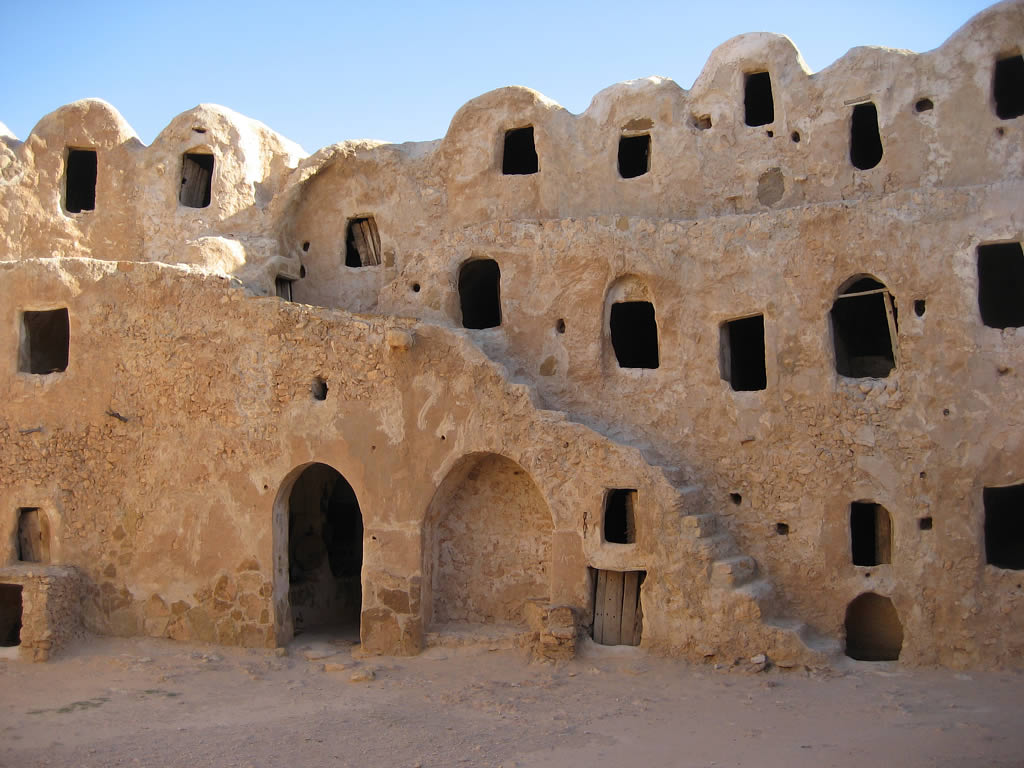
Interior of Gasr al-Hajj in Libya, a fortified granary with a circular layout

In Tunisia:

- Medenine
- Metameur
- Ksar Aouadid
- Ksar El Kedim (near Ksar Aouadid, also known as Ksar Zenata)
- Ksar Ouled Soltane
- Ksar Ez Zahra
- Ksar Ouled Debbab

In Libya:

- Gasr Al-Hajj

== In popular culture ==
Ghorfas were featured prominently in the film Star Wars: Episode I – The Phantom Menace as the slave quarters of Mos Espa, home to Anakin Skywalker. These scenes in the film show ghorfas from several locations in southern Tunisia, including Ksar Ouled Soltane and Ksar Hadada.

== See also ==
- Fortified Granaries of Aures
- Chenini
- Douiret
- Menzel (Djerba)
