= Menzel (Djerba) =

Tunisian housing type

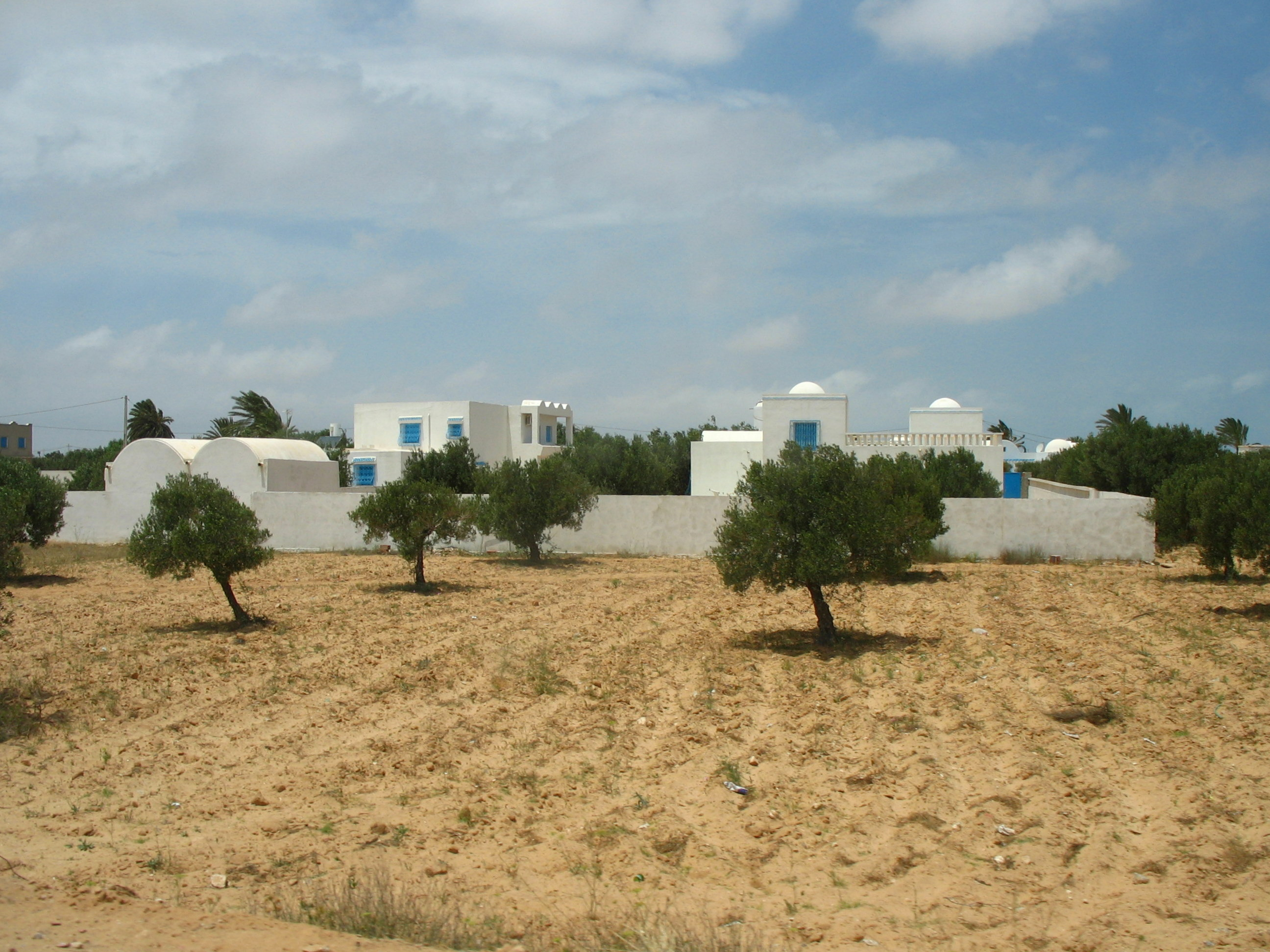
Outside view of a menzel

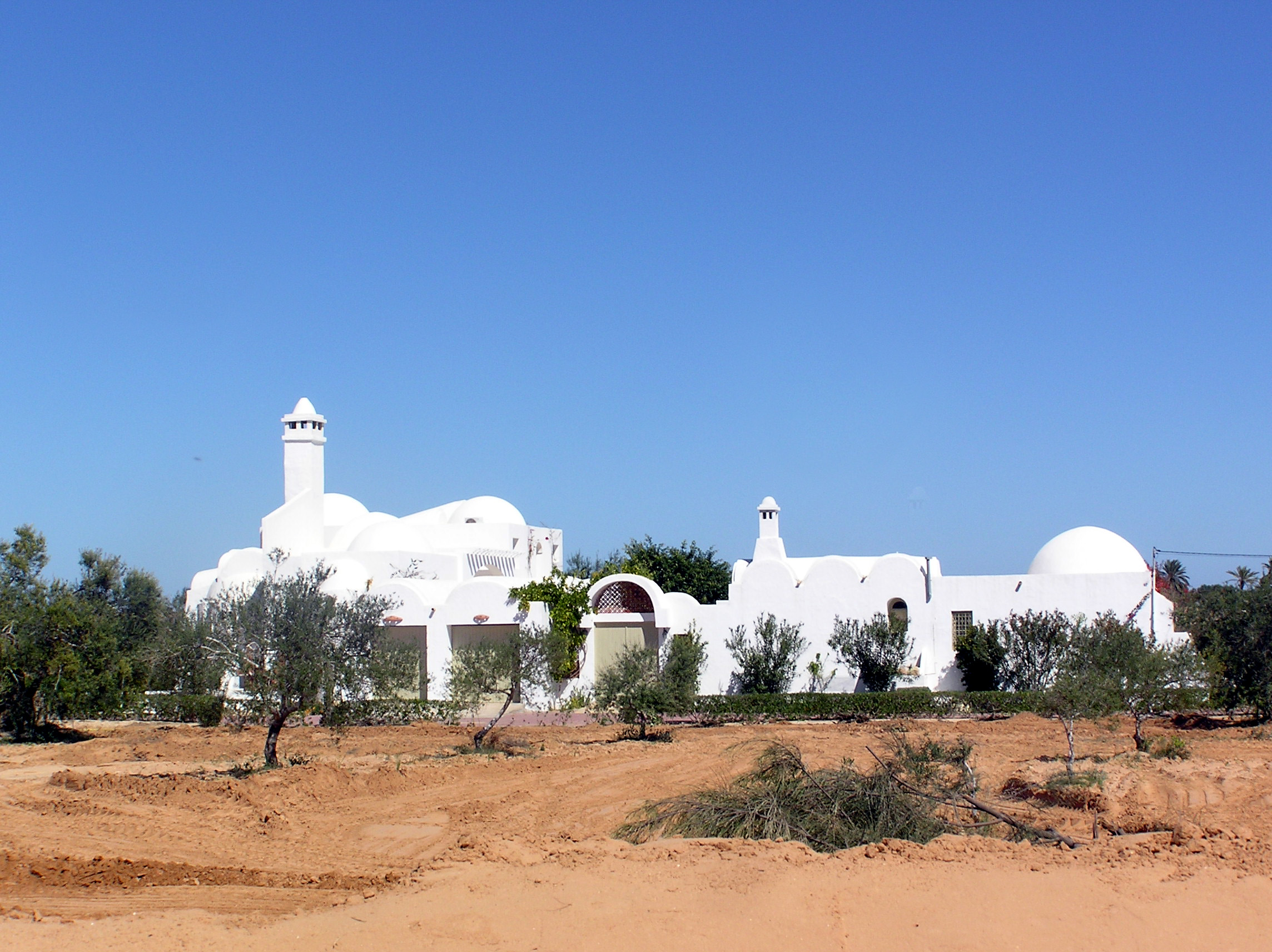
Another menzel

Menzel (Arabic: منزل, lit. "villa"; pronounced in Modern Standard Arabic as "manzul") is a type of dwelling and agricultural property typical of the Tunisian island of Djerba.

The spatial ensemble consisting of the dwelling and associated agricultural plots is usually owned by an extended family and typically occupies between two and five hectares planted with palm trees, olive trees, fruit trees, sorghum, cereals, and vegetable farming. Depending on the region where it is implanted, the menzel has one or several wells or cisterns for irrigating the fields.

== Description ==
A menzel is made up of several housing units (houch), surrounded by orchards and fields. Sometimes associated with the menzel are weaving workshops, barns, olive oil winery (often underground). Each menzel has a variable number of wells or cisterns and is surrounded by slopes (habia) with defensive functions, where palm trees, cactus hedges (prickly pear trees), agaves and aloes are planted that increase privacy and protect against dust and sand invasion. It is usually inhabited by three generations of the same family.

Historically, and similar to the peculiar mosques of Djerba, the menzels had defensive functions and therefore have characteristics of small fortresses. Some scholars suggest that the basic floor plan of the menzels may have originated from the Roman limes forts (fortified frontiers) that existed in southern Tunisia, what is now the province of Tataouine.

=== The houch ===
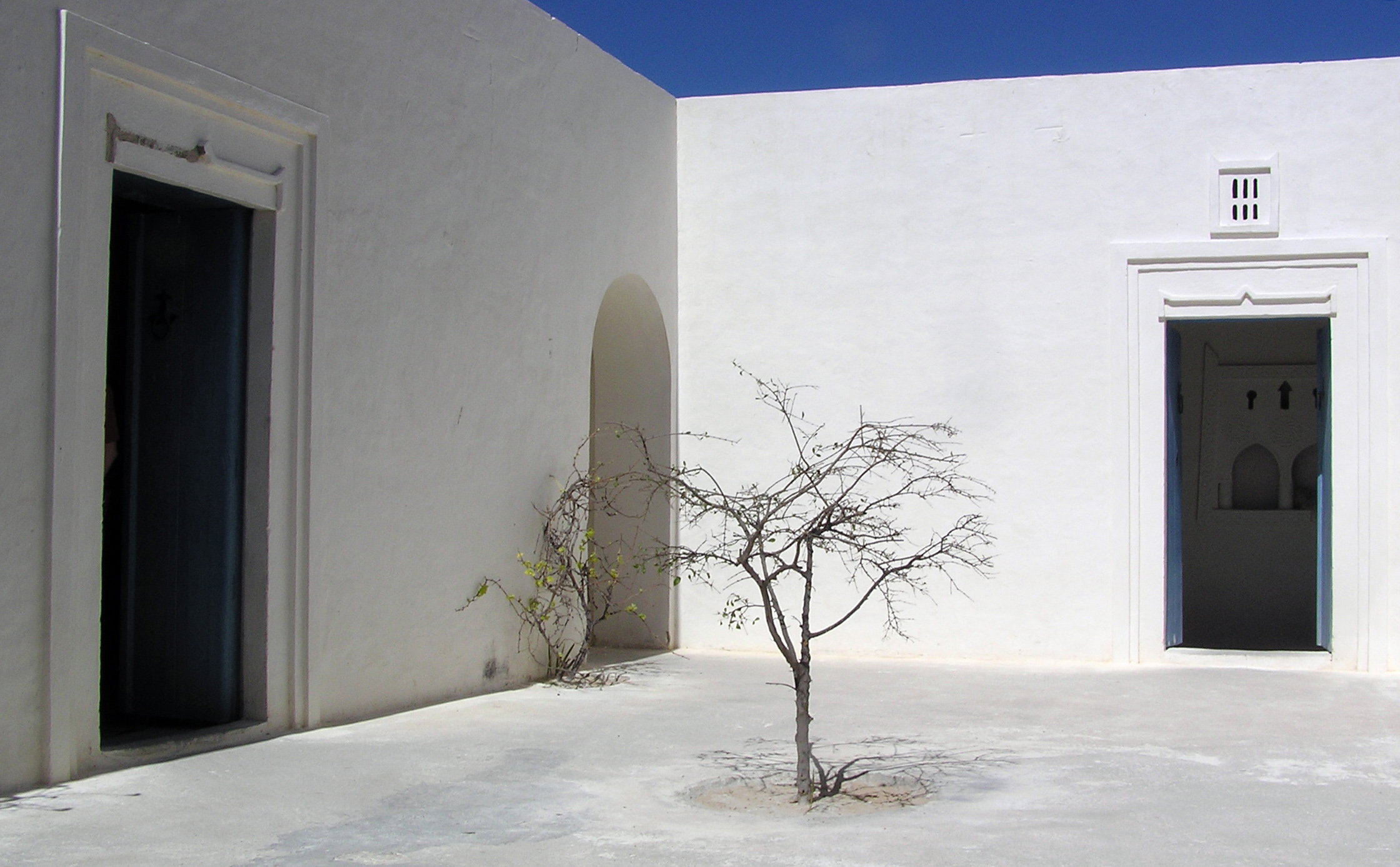
Central courtyard of a menzel with a hina plant

The houch, the menzel living areas, are square or rectangular, with no windows to the outside. The windows usually open into an inner courtyard, around which are two to four dwelling blocks (dar) of varying size, usually covered by vaults and domes, which provide very effective thermal insulation against heat. The dar can be divided by internal partitions, doors, or simple curtains (kella), where one finds the sedda or doukkana (sleeping rooms), magsoura (small rooms), el-khzana (pantry), and mesthan or moust-han (small bathrooms without toilet). The doukkana, the winter bedroom, has a vaulted ceiling and has an ed-dokkana, a raised bench-like platform about 50 cm high, which serves as a bed. Next to one of its extremities is a wall niche (taga) that serves as a bedside table. In one corner there is a small orifice to the outside, the el-midhouaya, which allows to see the sunrise, that is, to know when it is time to get up. The moust-han has a rudimentary shower, consisting of a clay pot (el-briq), hung between two stakes above head height. In the el-khzana, olive oil, date palms, and cereals were kept in large amphorae (sefri). In the past, boys who married obtained their own apartment in the houch from their parents.

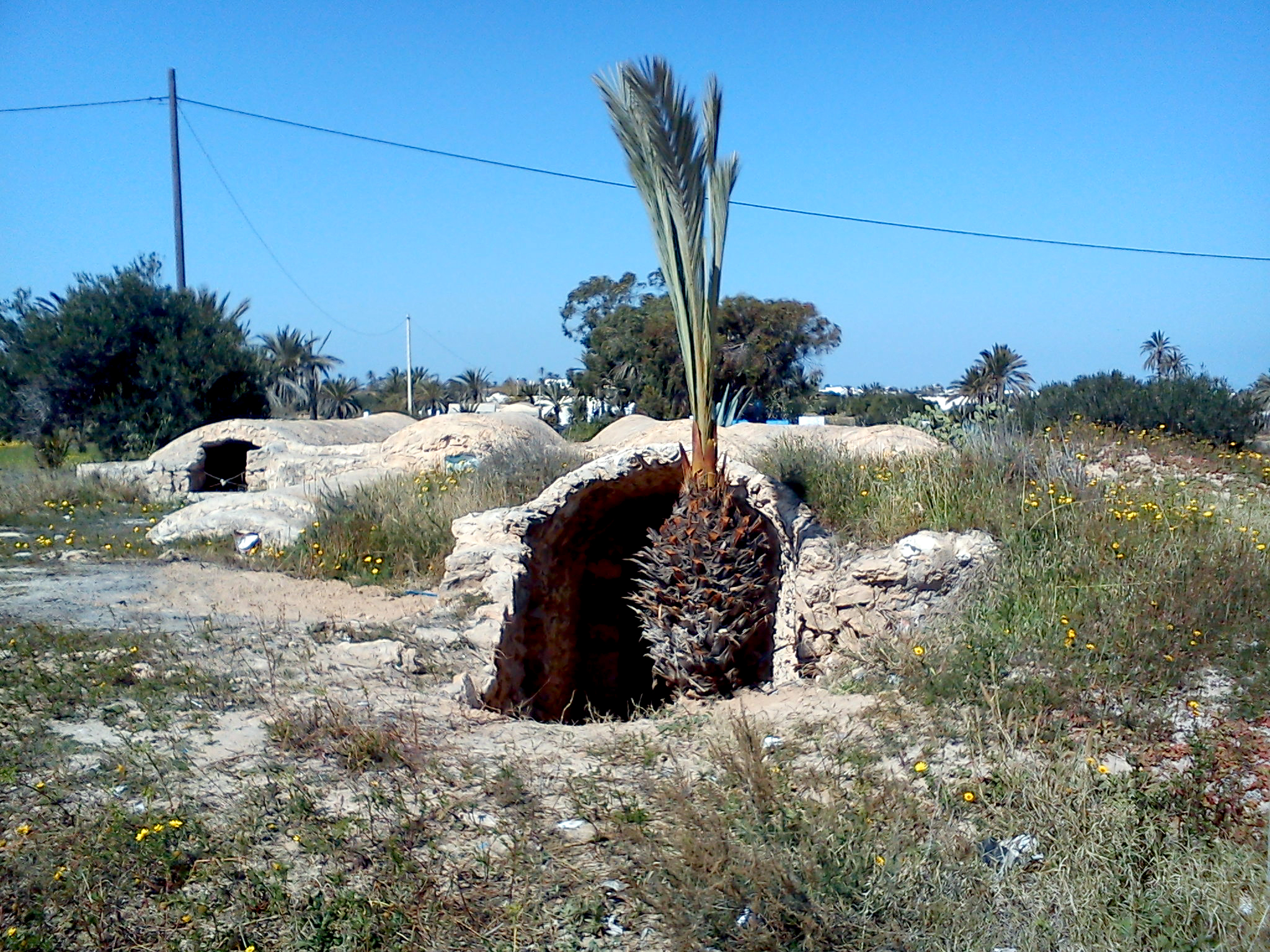
Underground olive oil winery in ruins

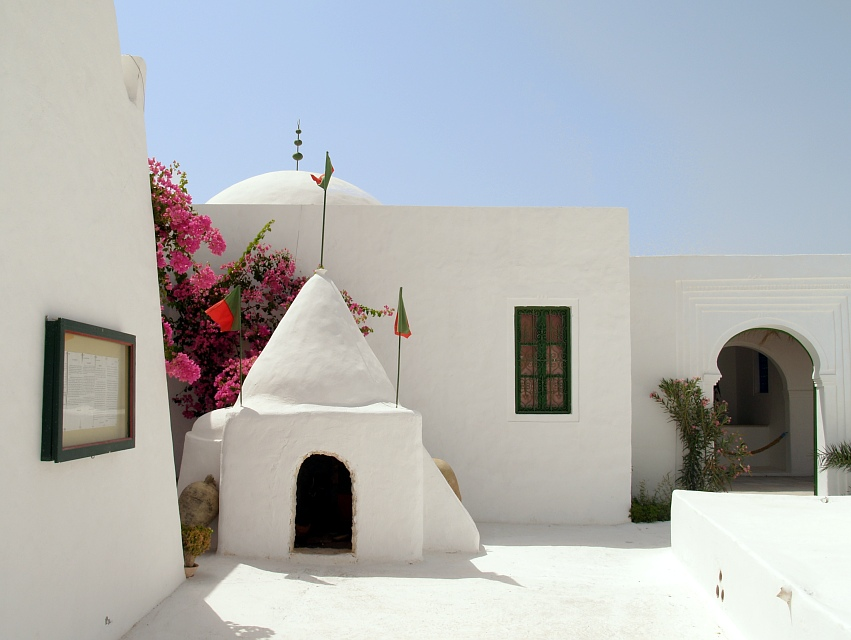
Reconstitution of part of a traditional houch at the Guellal Museum, whose building has the shape and style of a giant 'menzel'

The sqifa, located at the entrance, is the area of the menzel where its inhabitants gather and also serves to receive neighbors and less important visitors. For the more important visitors, wealthier families usually have a makhzin dhiafa, a block independent or attached to the houch, which often has an entrance to the outside. Another part of the menzel is the khouss, a construction made of palm trunks where the kitchen and the bathroom are located. The kitchen can also be a somewhat autonomous part, and is then called the matbakh. The bathroom with toilet is called knif or mihadh. The washing area, the houch el bir, where the pots of water - usually brackish - that is used in washing jobs that do not include detergents, are kept.

In some cases, in addition to these parts the houch has one or more ghorfas, (Note: The term ghorfa is usually associated with the alveoli, or cubicles that are the basic element of the Alcaciers of the Maghreb, a kind of barns and fortified warehouses, but in Djerba, when applied to menzels it has a different meaning.) towers or square blocks higher than the rest of the houch, situated at the corners. Access to the ghorfas is by a rigid internal staircase without handrail, under which there may be a deep niche (el-mkhaba) where the et-tass was kept, a small amphora with a wide neck where barley flour used as a base for zammita (or zommita), one of the most traditionally eaten dishes in Djerba, especially at breakfast. During the hot season, the menzels caps are used as sleeping quarters because of their coolness. They are the only parts of the menzel that have small openings facing outward, judiciously oriented so as to capture the sea breeze, which cools the interior.

=== Furniture ===
The furniture is generally simple and austere. The beds are simple mattresses placed directly on top of mats (h'sira) or on masonry platforms or stools (sedda or doukkana). There are chests or large pots for storing clothes, marfaa (kind of coat hangers), sofra or mida (kind of low tables where one eats sitting on mats or long, low cushions called gaada). Food reserves were kept in large baked clay pots (khabia, tass, zir or sefri), manufactured centuries ago in the village of Guellala, which is also the source of all the traditional dishes of Djerba. (Note: The type of dishes made in Guellal were already used by the Romans for the export of olive oil from Djerba to Rome.)

=== Cisterns ===
In view of the low rainfall (less than 250 mm per year) and the consequent lack of drinking water, the Djerbans have gained the habit of building cisterns to collect and store rainwater through impluviums. (Note: In a strict sense, an impluvium was an uncovered courtyard or tank existing in Ancient Roman houses where rainwater flowing from roofs was collected. In French, the Latin term is also used to denote other similar systems for collecting and storing rainwater. (see Impluvium in the French Wikipedia)) There are two types of cisterns: feskia or fesghia and majen or majel. The first ones are usually underground, rectangular or square in shape, and are located outside the houch. The second ones resemble huge, wide open carboys, and are mostly built inside the inner courtyard of the houch. The majen and feskia collect the rainwater that falls on the roof of the dwellings, terraces and courtyards, which are whitewashed with quicklime (jir) every year before the wet season in order to ensure some hygiene. This system of rainwater collection already existed in Roman times, and large cisterns were discovered in the ancient city of Meninx. In 1967 it was estimated that the area used by impluviums in Djerba was about 1,000,000 m².

== Bibliography ==
- Bernard, Élise (2002). "Djerba, tourisme international et nouvelles logiques migratoires". Revue Européenne des Migrations Internationales. 18: 102–103. doi:10.4000/remi.2629. ISSN 1777-5418.
- Bouslama, Abdelmajid (2010). Les portes du Menzel (in French). Paris: Éditions Abencérage; Cartago: Éditions cartaginoiseries. p. 344. ISBN 9789973704184.
- Morris, Peter (2001). The Rough Guide to Tunisia. London: Rough Guide. p. 503. ISBN 1-85828-748-0.
- Ouezdou, Hédi Ben (2007). Découvrir la Tunisie du Sud. Djerba. Perle de la Méditerranée (in French). Tunes. ISBN 9789973616043.
- Tlatli, Salah-Eddine (1967). Djerba. L'île des Lotophages (in French). Tunes: Cérès Productions. p. 191. OCLC 3206295.
- Stablo, René (1941). Les Djerbiens. Une communauté arabo-berbère dans une île de l'Afrique française. Tunes: SAPI. p. 164. OCLC 32421833.
- Éternelle Djerba (in French). Tunis: Association de sauvegarde de l’île de Djerba et Société tunisienne des arts graphiques; Société tunisienne des arts graphiques. 1998. OCLC 49614743.
