= Ramlibacter tataouinensis =

Scientific classification
- Domain: Bacteria
- Kingdom: Pseudomonadati
- Phylum: Pseudomonadota
- Class: Betaproteobacteria
- Order: Burkholderiales
- Family: Comamonadaceae
- Genus: Ramlibacter
- Species: R. tataouinensis

Binomial name
- Ramlibacter tataouinensis Heulin et al. 2003

Species of bacterium

Ramlibacter tataouinensis is a Gram-negative beta-proteobacterium. It was first isolated from meteorite fragments buried in the sands of a desert near Tataouine, Tunisia. The bacterium may exist as two forms: cyst and rod. Its morphology depends on the environment. During daytime when the desert environment is extremely hot and dry, Ramlibacter tataouinensis exist in cyst form. In its cyst form, Ramlibacter tataouinensis is well protected against desiccation. Remarkably, this novel desert bacterium has the highest known average G+C content among the beta-proteobacterium. G+C base pairs are known to have stronger hydrogen bonding interactions than A+T base pairing. Thus, a higher G+C content may prove to be a protective mechanism for life in harsh desert conditions.

== Light receptors ==
The genome of Ramlibacter tataouinensis encodes for numerous light receptors. The number of light receptors found in Ramlibacter tataouinensis, a chemolithotroph, is usually seen in phototrophic bacteria. A total of six genes encodes for light sensing proteins : 2 red/infrared sensing and 4 blue light sensing. These light sensing proteins would allow Ramlibacter tataouinensis to distinguish between night and day. A discrete ability to "tell time" may facilitate the growth pattern of the desert bacterium. During cold desert nights, dew forms and the availability of water confers Ramlibacter tataouinensis with limiting substrate i.e. water which may stimulate cell growth and division.

== Tolerance to oxidative stress and DNA repair mechanisms ==
Reactive oxygen species (ROS) are highly volatile and can damage living cells. Superoxide, an example of a ROS, can be transformed into less harmful molecules i.e. oxygen and hydrogen peroxide by an enzyme called superoxide dismutase. Ramlibacter tataouinensis possesses two forms of superoxide dismutase, one existing in the cytoplasm and the other in periplasm. Ramlibacter tataouinensis has genes encoding for carotenoid biosynthesis. Carotenoid are photosynthetic pigments usually found in chloroplasts of plants and in photosynthetic organisms like algae and fungus. These pigments assist in the transfer of light energy to the reactive centers during photosynthesis. Since Ramlibacter tataouinensis derives its energy from inorganic carbon compounds, the synthesis of carotenoids can be a means of quenching ROS. Three proteins may be responsible for repairing its DNA due to photo-damage. Two forms of deoxyribodipyrimidine photolyase and a conserved hypothetical protein(CHP) all assist in potentially repairing DNA.
