= Douiret =

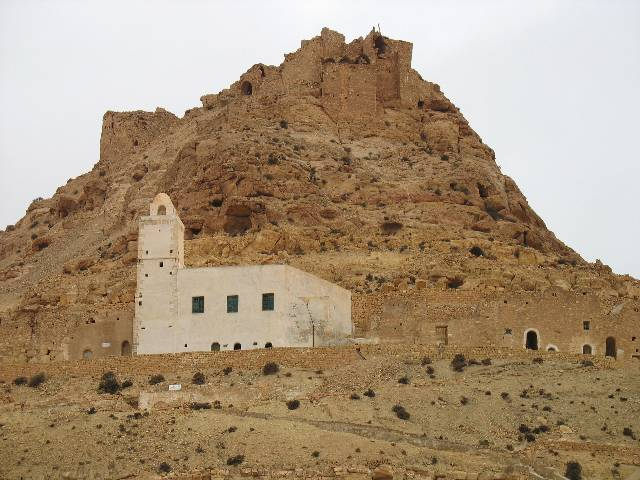
- Ruined Berber village of Douiret, with its prominent mosque. Photographed by Andy Carvin in November 2005.

- Location in Tunisia
- Coordinates: 32°52′N 10°17′E
- Country: Tunisia
- Governorate: Tataouine Governorate
- Time zone: UTC1 (CET)

Douiret (Berber: Eddwirat or igherman, Arabic: دويرات) is a ruined Berber village in the Tataouine district in southern Tunisia. Located on a hilltop near a modern village of the same name, Douiret was a fortified granary, or ksar (plural ksour.) Like other ksour created by North African Berber communities, Douiret was built on a hilltop to help protect it from raiding parties. Douiret is a regular stop on southern Tunisia's ksar trail, along with the villages of Chenini, Ksar Ouled Soltane and Ksar Hadada.

The old village of Douiret is located 22 km southwest of Tataouine in a rugged mountainous region. The old village transformed into ruins is surmounted by its citadel or ksar overlooking troglodyte houses dug in the mountain and aligned in a meandering fashion along its cliff. A path of about 3 km is lined up with abandoned dwellings mostly in ruins with the exception of the eye-catching white mosque (known as 'the palm tree mosque' or Jamaa ennakhla) at midway and a couple of renovated dwellings serving as a showcase and/or an atypical motel to host visitors and tourists.

== History ==
The ancestry of Douiret is believed to be traced back to a founding father with the name of Ghazi Ben Douaieb Bou Kenana, who migrated to the region more than 600 years ago – possibly coming from the Moroccan region of Tafilalet (Louis, A. 1975. Douiret: Étrange Cité Berbère. Societé Tunisienne de Diffusion, Tunis). In 1850, Douiret population was around 3500 inhabitants. It has been an important caravan stop between Gabès to the north and the Libyan city of Ghdamès to the south. In 1882, Douiret was chosen temporarily by colonial France as the center for its military administrative authority in the southern part of Tunisia before abandoning it in favor of Tataouine soon after that. In the 20th century, Douiret had seen its population progressively decrease as many of its inhabitants migrated mainly to the Tunisian capitol Tunis. By the close of the 20th century and the beginning of the 21st century, the old village of Douiret has virtually transformed into a ghost town in ruins as the few remaining families opted to move to the new village of Douiret built at the mountain foothills not far from their ancestors' historic site.

Source: Douiret.net

== Language ==
Douiri language is one of the many closely related varieties the Berber language, a branch of the Afro-Asiatic language family. Today's Douiri language is infused with many Arabic words as well as Tunisian dialect with a myriad of foreign terms namely French and Italian. All inhabitants of Douiret, however, do speak Arabic as well.

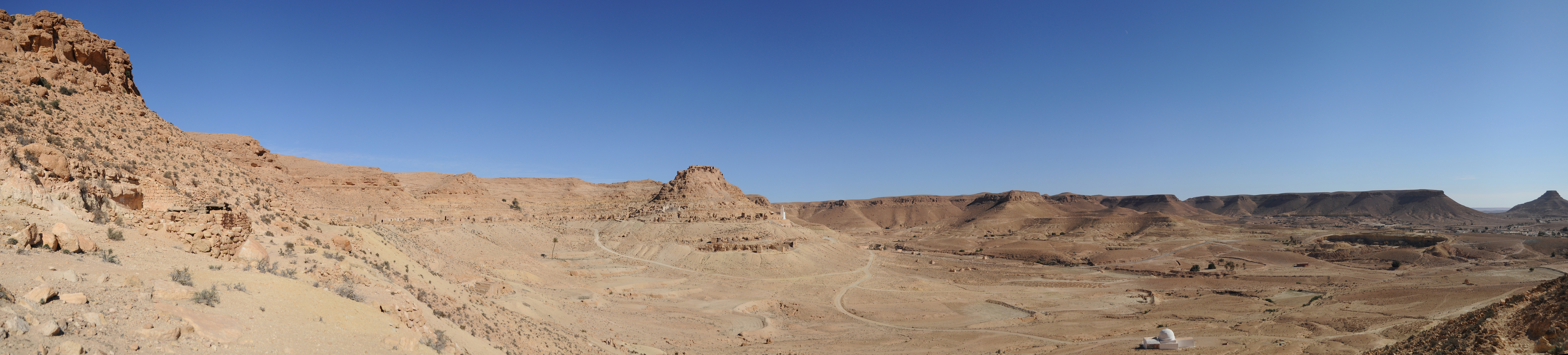
Panorama of the Douiret Berber village site, January 2011.
