= Chenini =

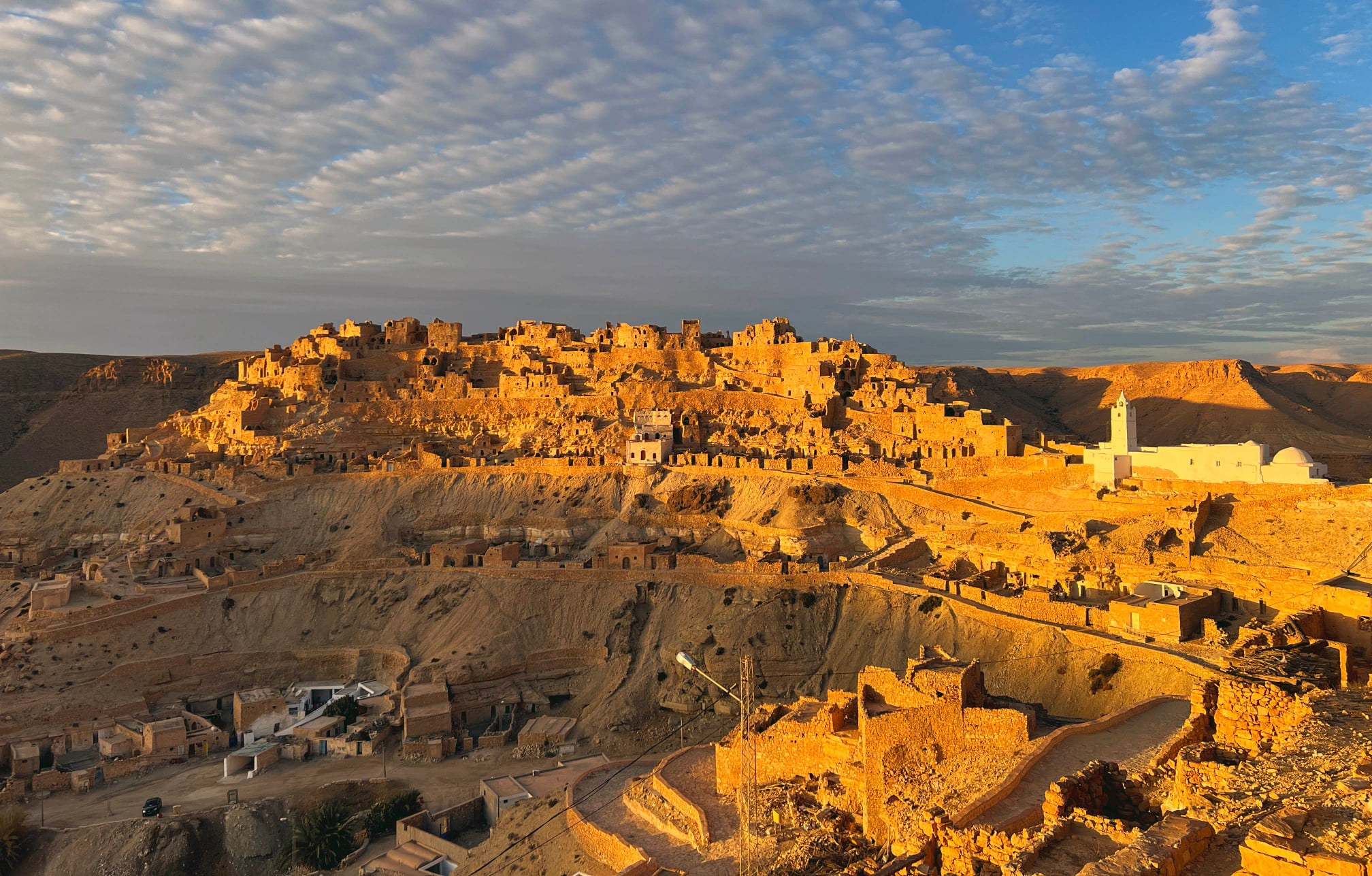
- Ruined Berber village of Chenini, with its prominent mosque.

- Location in Tunisia
- Coordinates: 32°54′37″N 10°15′44″E
- Country: Tunisia
- Governorate: Tataouine Governorate
- Time zone: UTC1 (CET)

Chenini (Arabic: شنيني) is a ruined Berber village in the Tataouine district in southern Tunisia. Located on a hilltop near a modern village of the same name, Chenini was a fortified granary, or ksar (plural ksour).

== History ==
Like other ksour created by North African Berber communities, Chenini was built on a hilltop - in this instance, between two hilltop ridges - to help protect it from raiding parties. The oldest structures on the hillside date back to the 12th century; some of the buildings are still used to store grain for the villagers living in the valley below.

=== Modern times ===
Chenini and the surrounding Tataouine district are also associated with the Star Wars film series. Many scenes for the movies were filmed in the area; one of the moons of the home planet of Luke Skywalker was named Chenini.

As of 2023, Chenini was inhabited by around 500 Berber farmers and herders who live in caves carved out of rock, many of which have been modernized. The village is facing a demographic decline as younger generations leave for Tunis and Europe in search of work. Chenini has limited amenities, and did not have Internet access until 2013. For high school education and medical emergencies, residents must travel to Tataouine, about half an hour away.

The village has a modern counterpart called New Chenini, which has running water and electricity and was home to around 120 families as of 2023.

Chenini is a regular stop on southern Tunisia's ksar trail, along with the villages of Douiret, Ksar Ouled Soltane and Ksar Hadada.

The village is home to the Mosquée de Sept Dormants, 'Mosque of the Seven Sleepers', one of several sites associated with the pious legend.

== Genetic findings ==
A genetic sample of Arabs from Chenini showed a 100% prevalence of the Berber-associated sub-haplogroup E-M183, a sub-haplogroup of E-Z827.

== Gallery ==
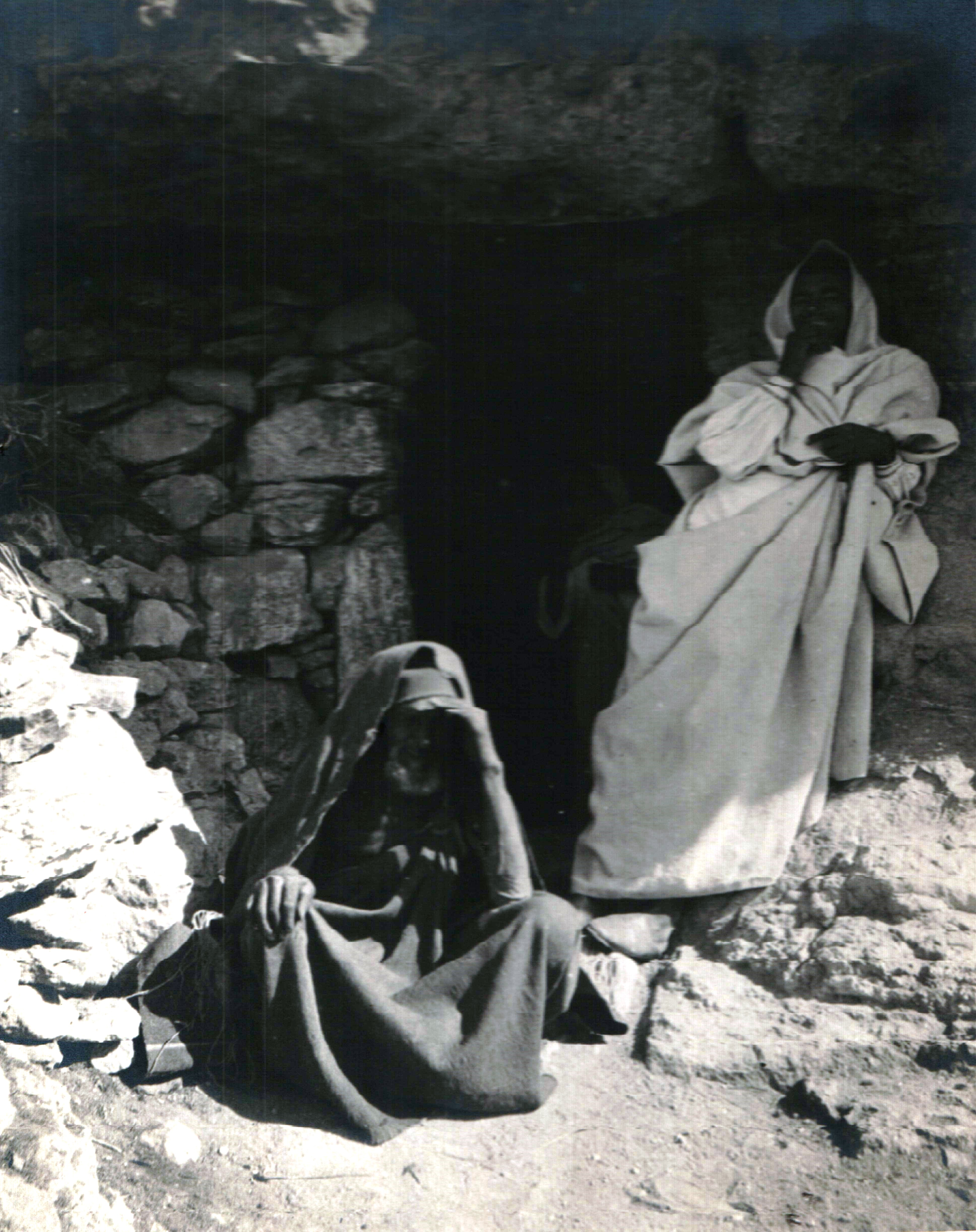
House in Chenini

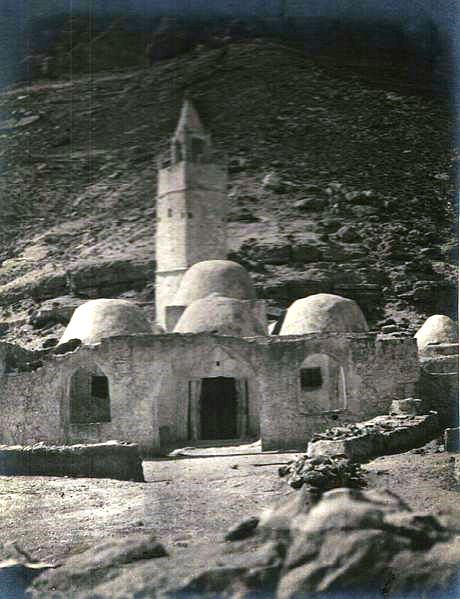
Cemetery in Chenini

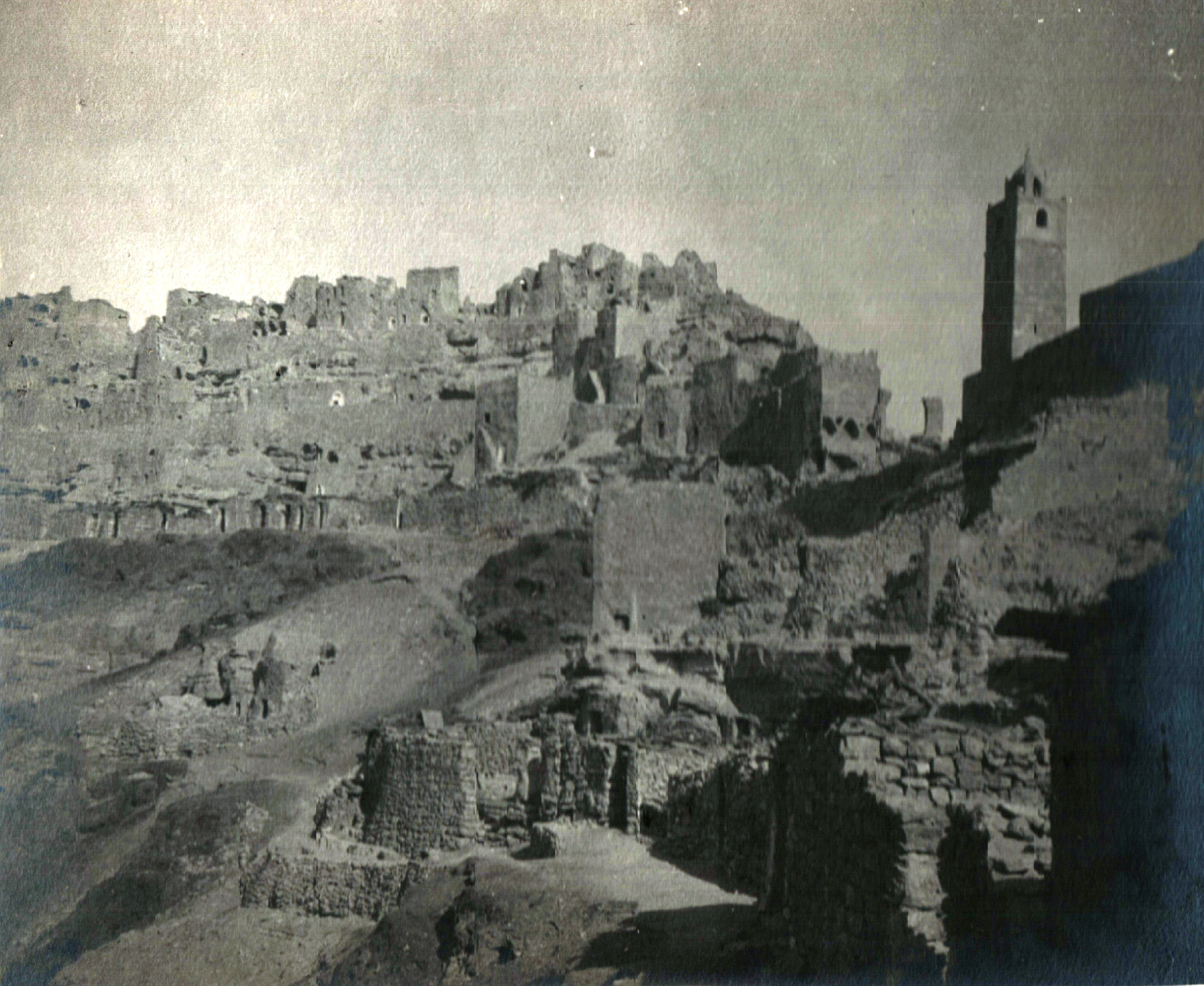
View of Chenini

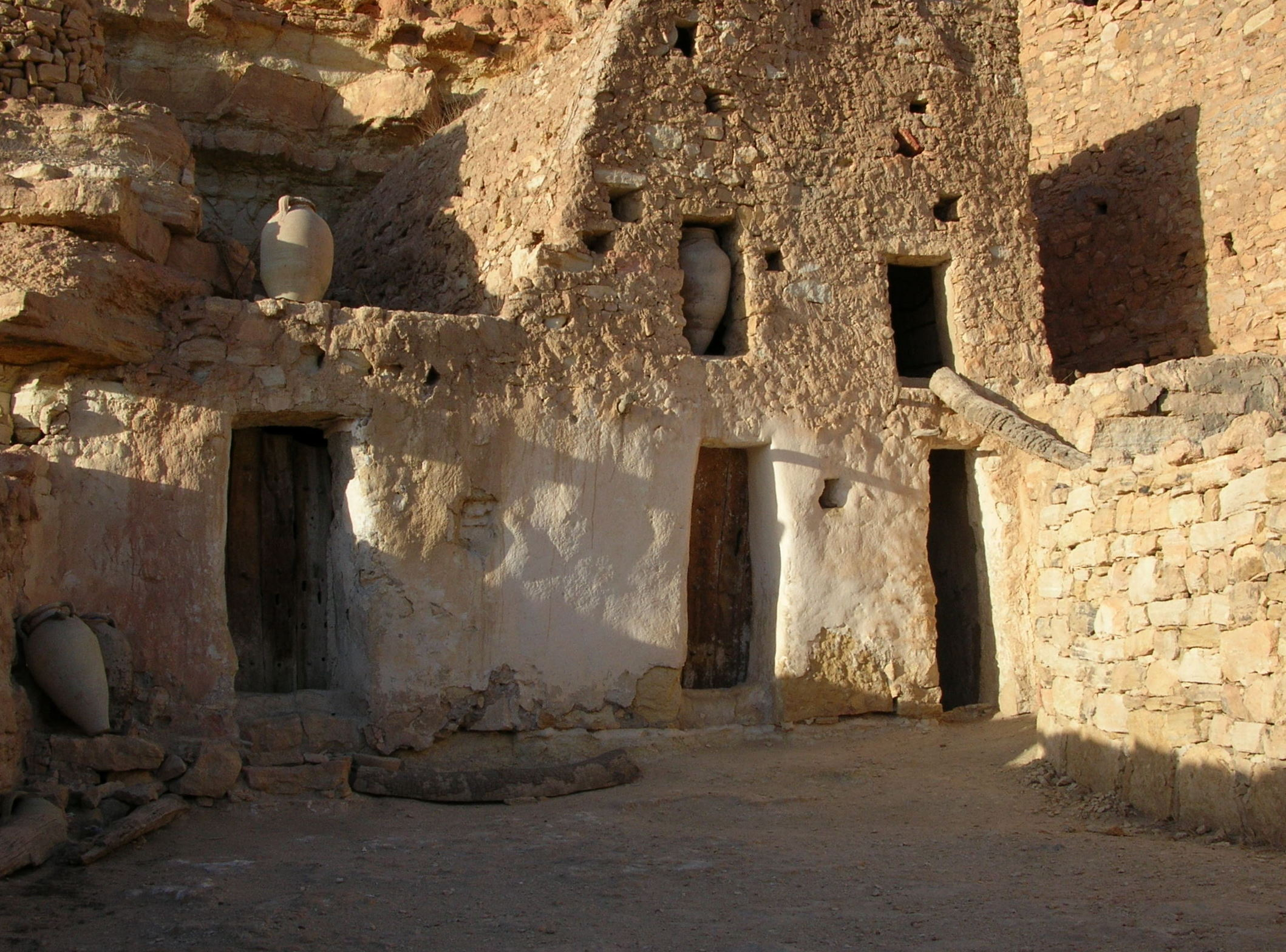
Entrances of an old dwelling

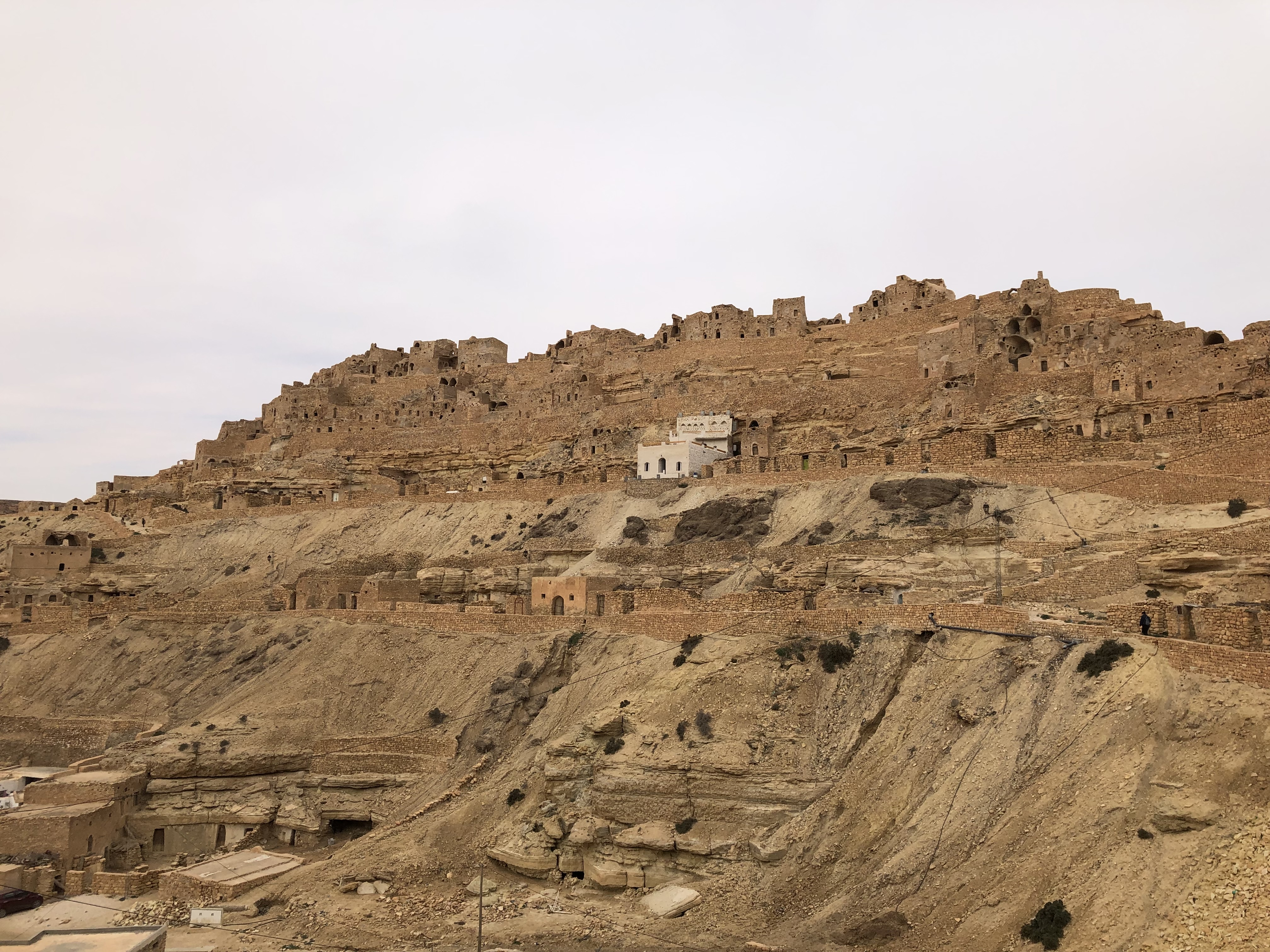
Ksar Chenini
