= Ksar Ouled Soltane =

Ksar in Tunisia

Coordinates: 32.788492°N 10.515037°E

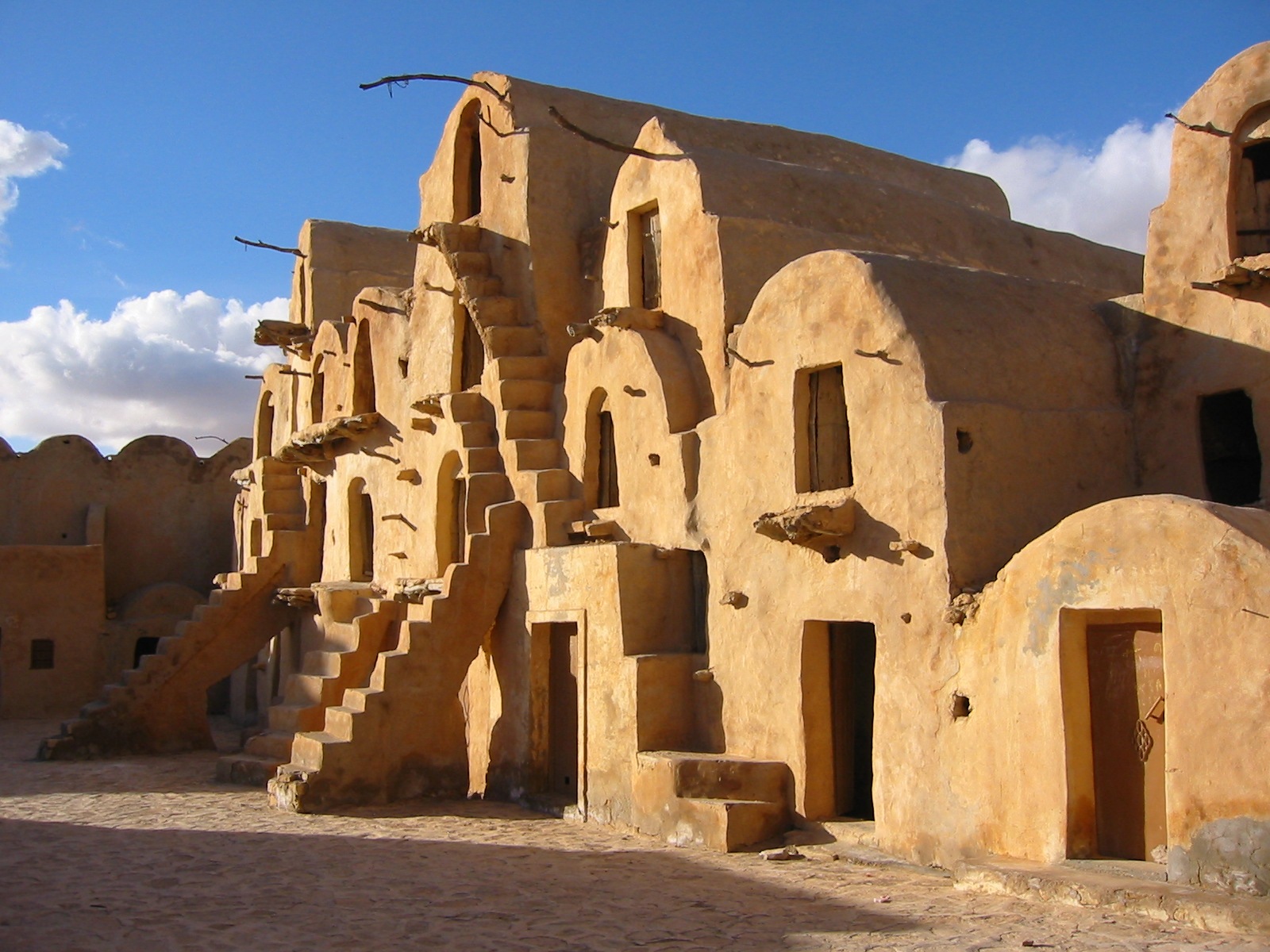
Ksar Ouled Soltane ghorfas

Ksar Ouled Soltane (Arabic: قصر أولاد سلطان) is a fortified granary, or ksar, located in the Tataouine district in southern Tunisia. The ksar is spread out over two courtyards, each of which has a perimeter of multi-story vaulted granary cellars, or ghorfas. Like other ksour (plural of ksar) built by Berber communities Ksar Ouled Soltane, is located on a hilltop, to help protect it from raiding parties in previous centuries. Kamel Laroussi dates its earliest construction to 1699.

Ksar Ouled Soltane is now a tourist destination, with visitors coming to see its well-preserved granary vaults. It was also featured in the film Star Wars: Episode I – The Phantom Menace in some of the scenes used to represent the slave quarters of Mos Espa, where the character Anakin Skywalker lived as a boy.

== See also ==
- List of ksour in Tunisia
