= Fortified granaries of Aures =

Fortress of Ath Mansour
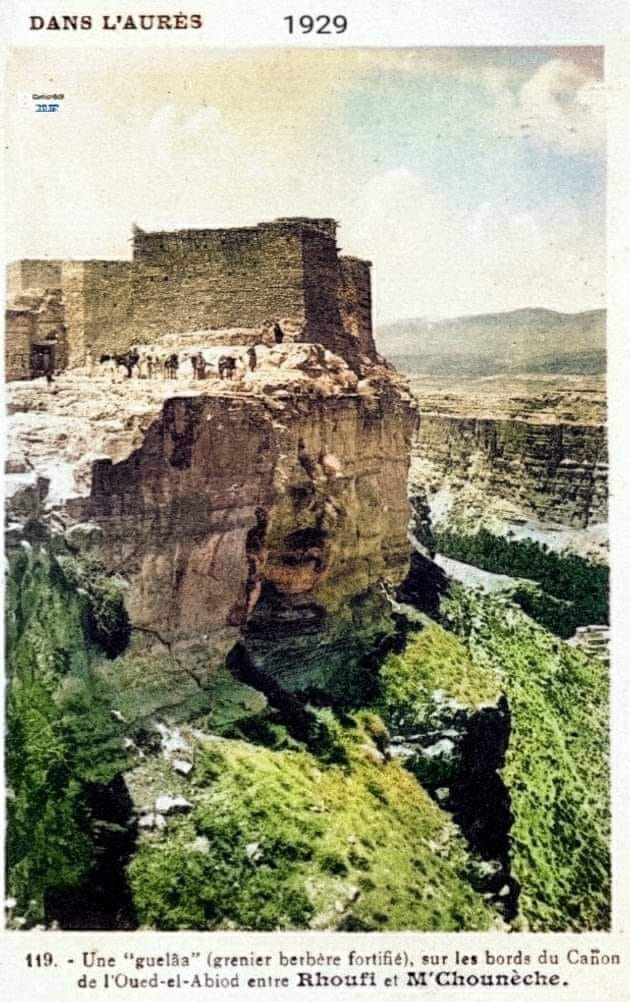
- Aures 1929

- Location within Algeria
- 35°05′25.0″N 6°01′51.6″E
- Type: fortified granaries
- Cultures: Chaoui people
- Location: Batna Province, Algeria

History
- Abandoned: 20th century

Site notes
- Material: Stone
- Condition: In ruins
- Public access: Available

The Fortified granaries of Aures known as "taq'liath" in Shawiya, are multi-storied defensible structures used for storing crops as well as a refuge during times of conflict. They were described in ancient times by Roman and Arab sources alike. 11th century Andalusian historian, Al-Bakri, specified that Aures had a large number of fortresses surrounded by water streams, These were dwellings of the Miknasa and Houara Berber tribes. in 1878, the fortresses were rediscovered by French anthropologist Émile Masqueray who produced a picturesque description of these "Eagle nests".

== Etymology ==
The term "Guelaa/Kalaa: plural:"taq'liath" is derived from the Arabic word for "citadel" or "fort", Similar structures across North Africa have different names: in the Moroccan Sous region, they are called "Agadir", a loan-word from phoenician that mean "wall", while in southern Tunisia, they are referred to as "ghorfa" meaning "room". These variations in terminology highlight the cultural specificity of these structures.

== Development ==
A close examination of Auresian dwellings reveals a continuum of architectural evolution from simple caves to the multi-storied stone granaries, The development of the fortified granaries of Aures is thus rooted in the agricultural and security needs of the Auresian people. In ancient times, the open crop fields were vulnerable to raids by camel marauders, prompting the cultivation of land closer to high altitude fortified granaries and the construction of terrace gardens for irrigation.

The Auresians often attribute their agricultural techniques to the Romans, whose ruins are scattered across the region. However, the influence likely extends to earlier civilizations that refined existing agricultural methods in North Africa, as historians have often identified fortified granaries, such as those in Ath Mansur and Jellal, with the ancient Numidian strongholds, with villages perched on rocky hills and accessible only by narrow paths. These structures, with single gateways, demonstrate a modern example of Jugurtha's treasure houses described by Sallust in antiquity.

Historian Jean Despois notes that these granaries are emblematic of the Auresian political, social, and economic structures. In Aures, power resided with the heads of families within clans and fractions, or with their elected representatives, reflecting a highly organized and egalitarian society. These "Berber republics" resisted central control and Arabization, with the granaries symbolizing the cohesion and independence of these small, autonomous communities.

While the use of granaries as dwellings has diminished under French colonial rule, they remain a significant part of the Aures Mountains' cultural heritage. One notable example is the Ait Daoud clan. Their granary, which stands eight stories high, continued to be a place of veneration for their ancestral saints. Each month of May, members go there to perform a pledge of fertility, sacrifice animals, and eat a communion meal.

=== Design ===
The fortified granaries of Aures are predominantly stone-built, with roofs reinforced by palm tree trunks. These granaries, often square in shape, sometimes include openings for ventilation and light, adorned with symbolic decorations that reflect the community's deep connection to agriculture and nature. High-elevation springs were used to fill reservoirs at night. Water was then channeled to terrace gardens through a network of miniature canals, ensuring efficient irrigation and crop maintenance.

The size of the granary depends on the prestige of the clan, The leading family often selects a caretaker, typically a poorer member who doesn't own land. This caretaker stays at the granary, maintaining order. They clear the snow, report water infiltrations, and assist with unloading grain, of which they take a portion as payment. The main gate stays closed, and the guard only opens it after being alerted by their dog's barking and verifying the visitor.

=== Defensive role ===
Centuries after Sallust's description of the fortified treasure houses, the Byzantine historian Procopius shed light on these structures again, noting their use by Iaudas, the ruler of the Aures kingdom, against the invading Romans. Procopius describes how water canals were employed to divert water and repel the Roman forces.

The tactics used by Iaudas were echoed in the 17th century in the same region. This time, the Auresians diverted water streams to flood the fields surrounding their granaries, successfully massacring the invading Arab Bedouins in the process.

== Preservation efforts ==
The fortified granaries of Aures, despite their notable importance to the heritage of the region and Algeria as a whole, remain largely neglected and vulnerable. In 2023, advocacy efforts from local activists have drawn the attention of an Italian mission from the University of Padua which later toured the region to inspect these structures.
