= Tataouine =

City in Tataouine Governorate, Tunisia

Tataouine: Tiṭṭawin (Berber languages); تطاوين (Arabic)
- City
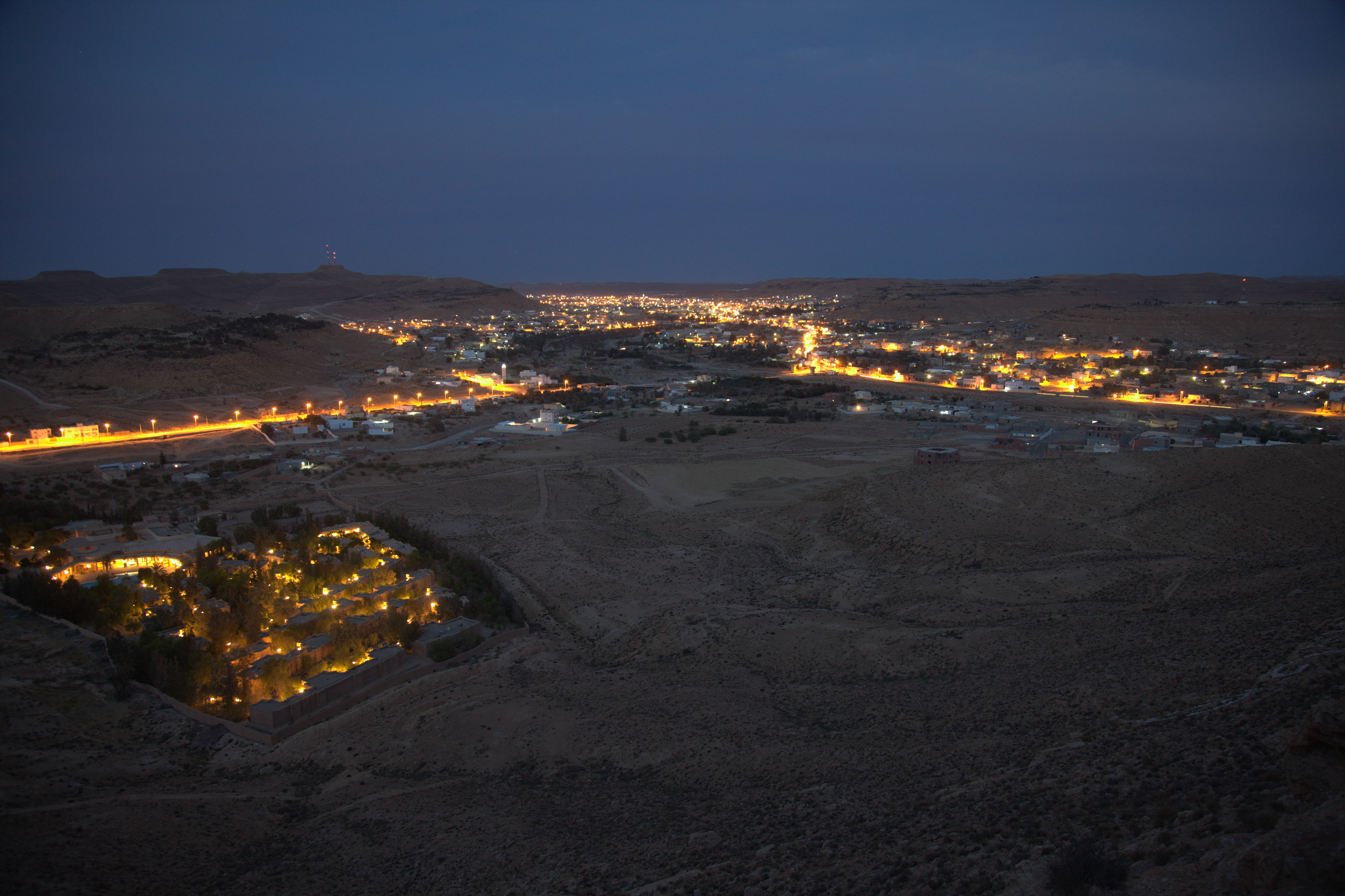
- Tataouine by night

- Location in Tunisia
- Coordinates: 32°55′50″N 10°27′00″E
- Country: Tunisia
- Governorate: Tataouine Governorate
- Delegation(s): Tataouine North, Tataouine South

Government
  - Mayor: Boubaker Souid (Ennahda)

Population (2022)
  - Total: 70,224
- Time zone: UTC1 (CET)

Tataouine (Berber languages: Tiṭṭawin; Arabic: تطاوين) is a city in southern Tunisia. It is the capital of the Tataouine Governorate. The below-ground "cave dwellings" of the native Amazigh population, designed for coolness and protection, render the city and the area around it as a tourist and film makers' attraction. Nearby fortified settlements (ksars), manifestations of Amazigh architecture, such as Ksar Ouled Soltane, Chenini, Douiret, and Ksar Hadada, are popular tourist sites.

== Etymology ==
The name Taṭaouine means 'water springs' in the Amazigh language. It is sometimes transliterated in European languages as Tatahouine, Tatahouïne, Tatawin or Tatooine. The names "Tataouine", "Tatahouine" and "Foum Tatahouine" all appeared in the postcards portraying the city in the 1920s.

The city used to be called Fum Taṭāwīn (فم تطاوين), alternatively spelled Fumm Tattauin, Foum Tatahouine, Fum Tatawin, or Foum Tataouine, which means 'mouth of the springs'.

== History ==
From 1892 to 1951, Tataouine was the garrison town of the French penal military unit known as the "Battalion of Light Infantry of Africa". After the French established the town, a mosque (built in 1898) and homes were built in Tataouine.

On 27 June 1931, a meteorite of unusual achondrite type and green color impacted at Tataouine; about 12 kilograms (26 lb) of fragments were found. The meteorite consists largely of the mineral enstatite, and is of the rare Diogenite type.

In March 2015, it was reported that ISIL was using Tataouine as a military base, but these claims were denied by the Tunisian government.

In September 2016, a new oil field was found south of the town by the Italian company Eni.

== Climate ==
Climate data for Tataouine (1991–2020, extremes 1989–present)
Month	Jan	Feb	Mar	Apr	May	Jun	Jul	Aug	Sep	Oct	Nov	Dec	Year
Record high °C (°F)	26.6 (79.9)	36.2 (97.2)	38.7 (101.7)	40.3 (104.5)	45.6 (114.1)	47.2 (117.0)	48.6 (119.5)	47.4 (117.3)	45.0 (113.0)	42.8 (109.0)	36.8 (98.2)	31.5 (88.7)	48.6 (119.5)
Mean daily maximum °C (°F)	17.5 (63.5)	18.9 (66.0)	22.7 (72.9)	26.6 (79.9)	30.9 (87.6)	35.1 (95.2)	37.9 (100.2)	37.7 (99.9)	34.2 (93.6)	29.9 (85.8)	23.2 (73.8)	18.5 (65.3)	27.7 (81.9)
Daily mean °C (°F)	12.8 (55.0)	13.7 (56.7)	17.0 (62.6)	20.2 (68.4)	24.1 (75.4)	27.8 (82.0)	30.5 (86.9)	30.6 (87.1)	28.1 (82.6)	24.2 (75.6)	18.3 (64.9)	14.0 (57.2)	21.8 (71.2)
Mean daily minimum °C (°F)	8.0 (46.4)	8.6 (47.5)	11.3 (52.3)	13.9 (57.0)	17.3 (63.1)	20.6 (69.1)	23.0 (73.4)	23.6 (74.5)	22.0 (71.6)	18.5 (65.3)	13.3 (55.9)	9.5 (49.1)	15.8 (60.4)
Record low °C (°F)	1.0 (33.8)	−1.8 (28.8)	2.0 (35.6)	4.2 (39.6)	8.4 (47.1)	9.4 (48.9)	16.1 (61.0)	17.8 (64.0)	12.8 (55.0)	8.2 (46.8)	5.3 (41.5)	1.0 (33.8)	−1.8 (28.8)
Average precipitation mm (inches)	16.3 (0.64)	17.4 (0.69)	19.6 (0.77)	9.0 (0.35)	5.7 (0.22)	3.0 (0.12)	0.4 (0.02)	7.9 (0.31)	11.3 (0.44)	15.6 (0.61)	19.6 (0.77)	14.3 (0.56)	140.1 (5.52)
Average precipitation days (≥ 1.0 mm)	2.2	2.1	2.3	1.5	1.1	0.3	0.1	0.4	1.6	1.6	2.1	2.2	17.6
Average relative humidity (%)	66.0	58.0	59.4	55.4	54.6	53.4	50.9	52.4	56.4	53.8	62.4	66.5	57.4
Source 1: Institut National de la Météorologie (humidity 1961–1990) (Note: The Station ID for Tataouine is 57272111.)
Source 2: NOAA

== Culture ==
The Ksour Festival (French: Festival international des ksour sahariens) is an annual festival held in Tataouine in March. In Tataouine some people speak a Berber dialect.

=== Tataouine in scientific names ===
==== Meteorite (Tatahouine) ====
On 27 June 1931, at 1:30 am, a meteorite of an estimated weight of 50 kilograms (110 lb) fell 4 kilometres (2.5 mi) north of the city. Due to a transcription error, it is recorded in the Meteoretical Society international database under the name Tatahouine (with an added h). It is a rare diogenite originating from 4 Vesta in the asteroid belt.

==== Bacteria (Ramlibacter tataouinensis) ====
On observing fragments of the Tatahouine meteorite, researchers noticed rod-like structures. Upon further investigation, those turned out to be a kind of bacteria which was named Ramlibacter tataouinensis (from Raml meaning sand in Arabic, bacter meaning bacteria in Latin, and the adjective referring to the town of Tatatouine) and which survive in the desert soil of the region despite harsh conditions. This bacteria and another closely related one which was named Ramlibacter henchirensis (from Henchir meaning in Tunisian dialect a field surrounded by stones or antique ruins) have the peculiar feature to be spherical during the day (forming a microbial cyst with a thick wall protecting them from desiccation, the extreme heat and the sun's UV) and become rod-like during the night when they need less protection, thus becoming able to move and colonize even the smallest cracks in rocks. The discovery and research around Ramlibacter tataouinensis is scientifically significant because it demonstrated that rod-like structures observed in another meteorite, the ALH 84001 discovered in Antarctica, and thought for a time to be of extraterrestrial origin, could actually be terrestrial bacteria from the ground which had contaminated and then colonized the sample.

==== Dinosaur (Tataouinea hannibalis) ====
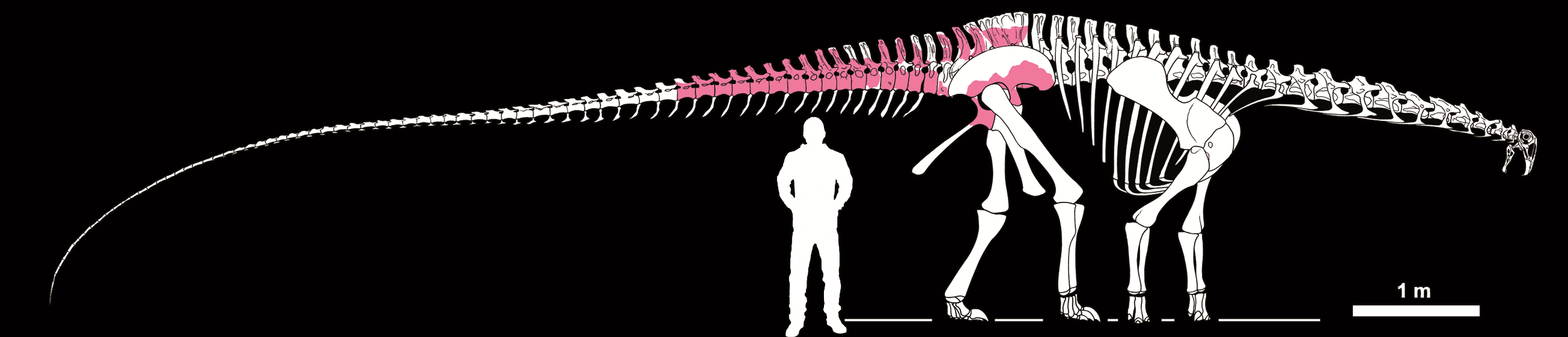
Reconstructed skeleton of Tataouinea, with known elements in pink

Numerous fossils, including vegetal, trees, animals, and dinosaurs footprints have been found in the region, several being exhibited at the local Museum of Earth Memory. Among dinosaurs, Tataouinea is a genus of rebbachisaurid dinosaurs with avian-like bone structures described in 2013. Additional fossil material was described in 2015. The generic name, "Tataouinea", references the city of Tataouine, while the specific name, "hannibalis", honors the Carthaginian general Hannibal Barca.

=== Popular culture ===
- Tataouine's name became famous worldwide when George Lucas, who shot the original Star Wars film in various locations in Tunisia, named Luke Skywalker's fictional home planet Tatooine.
- Tataouine appeared in the end of the film The X-Files as Foum Tataouine, where an extraterrestrial viral experiment facility was located.
- Tataouine appeared in the fifth episode of The Amazing Race 1.

== Image gallery ==
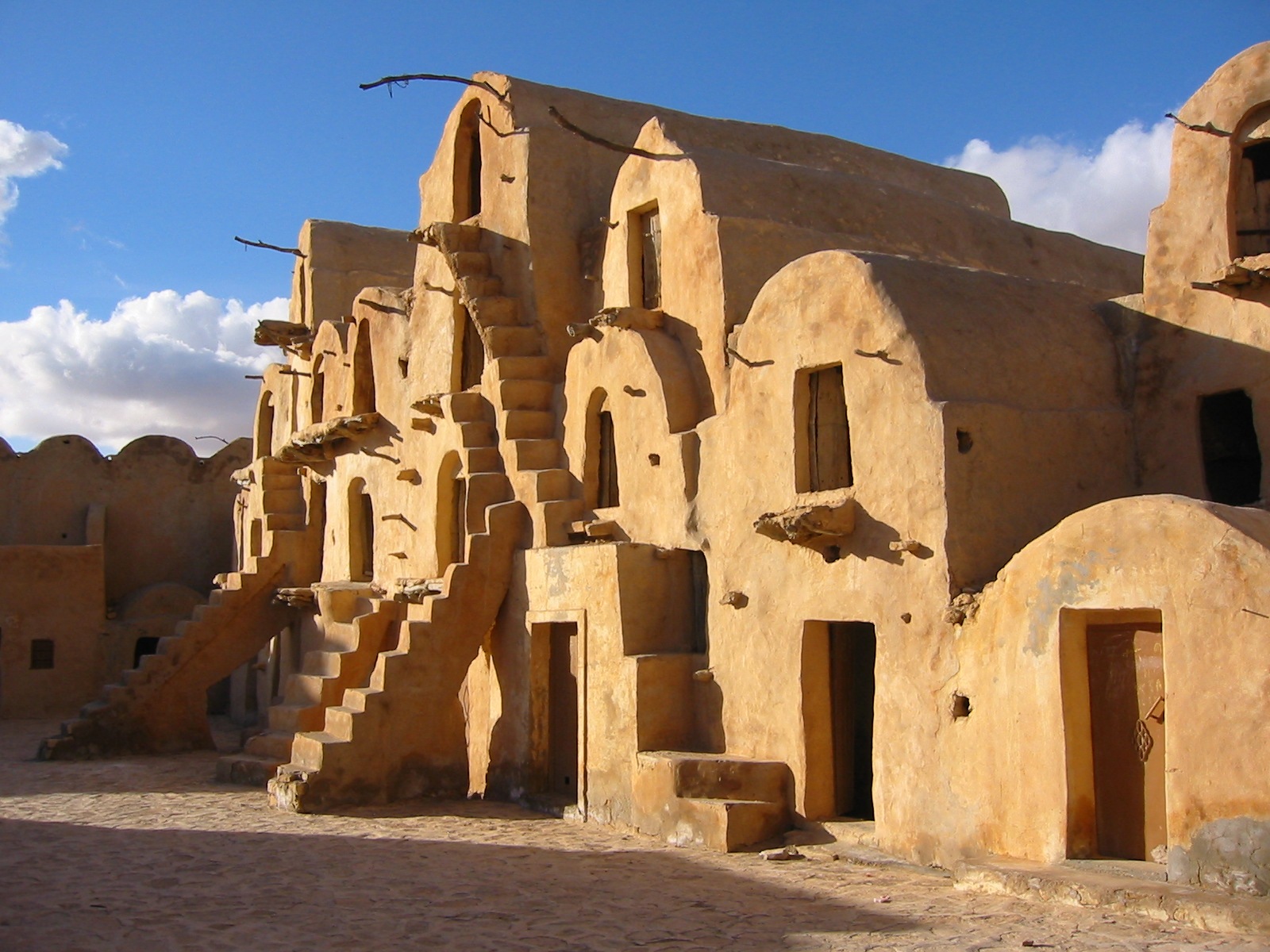

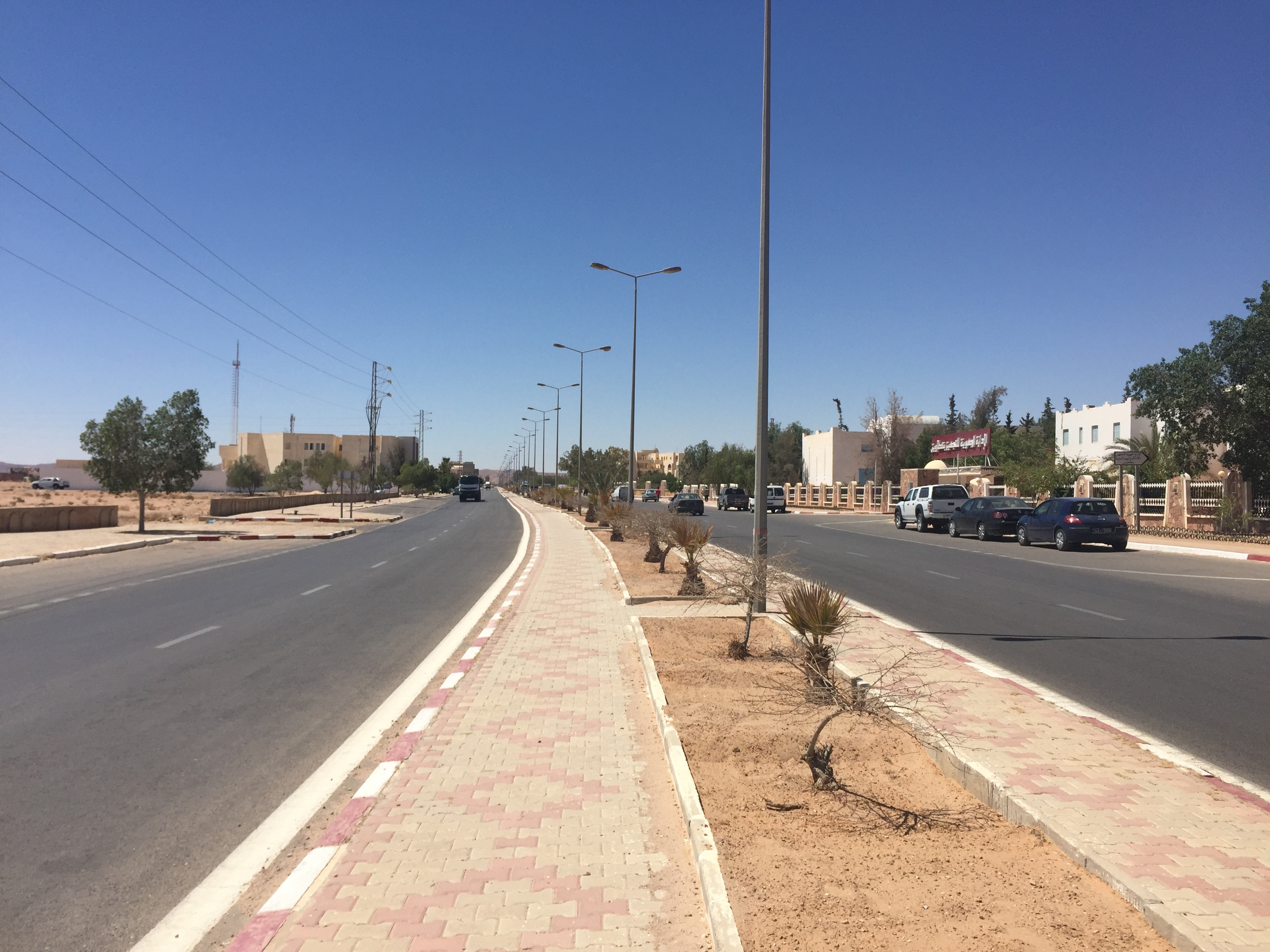

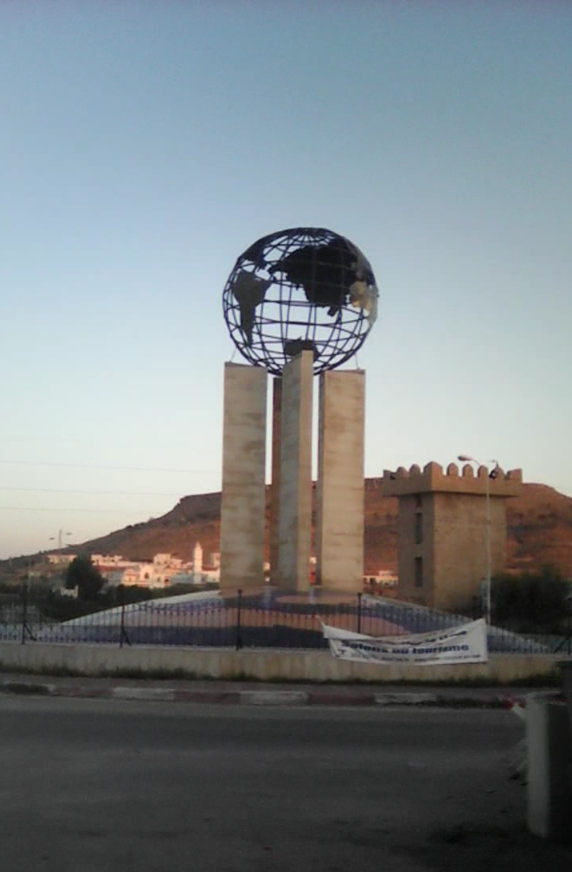

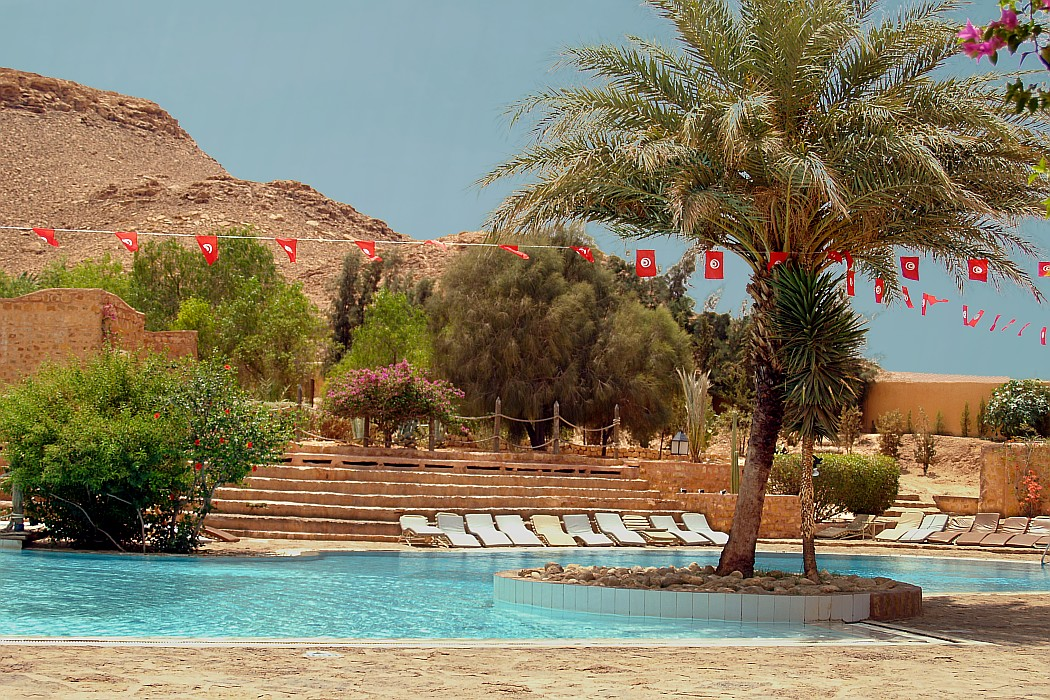

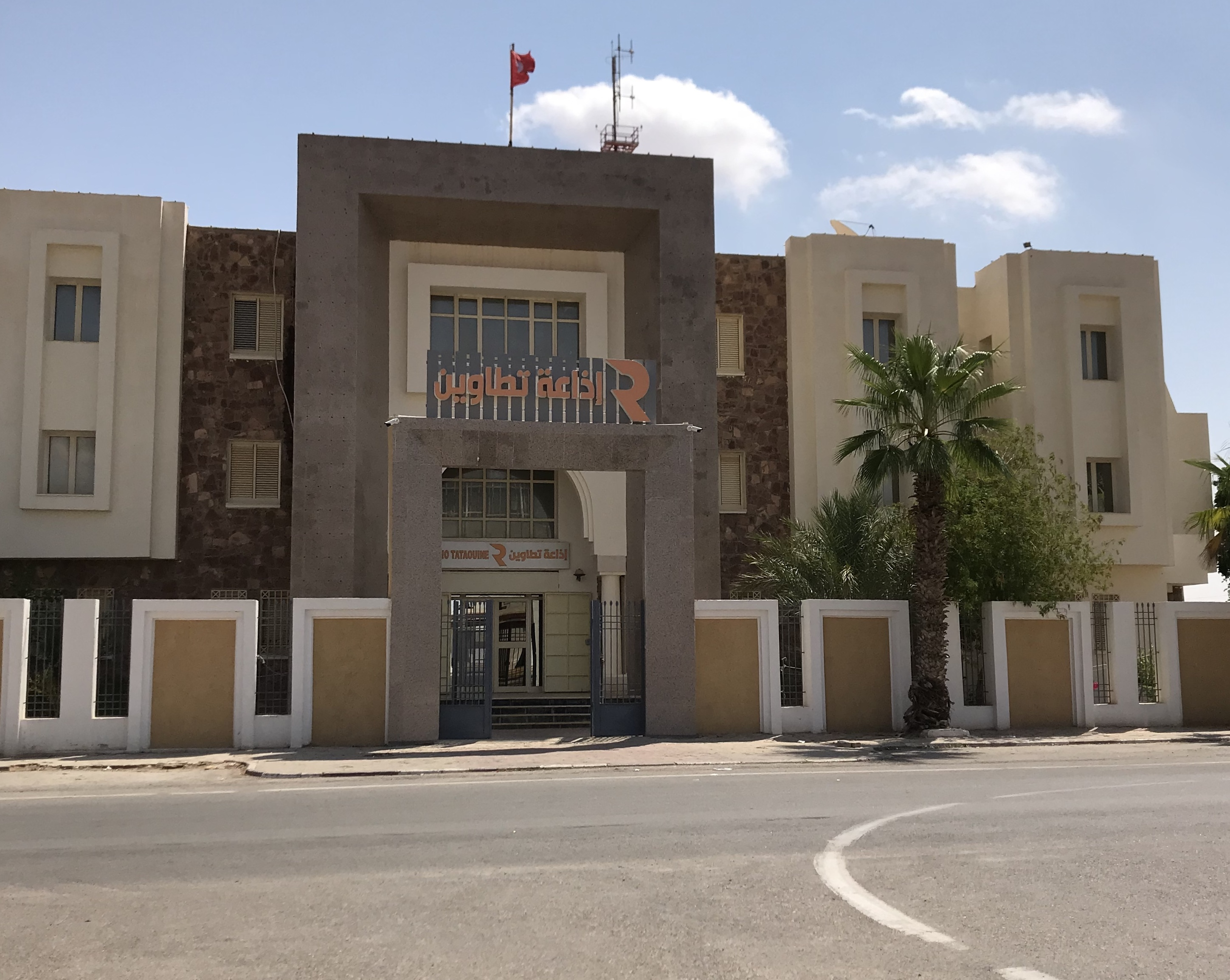

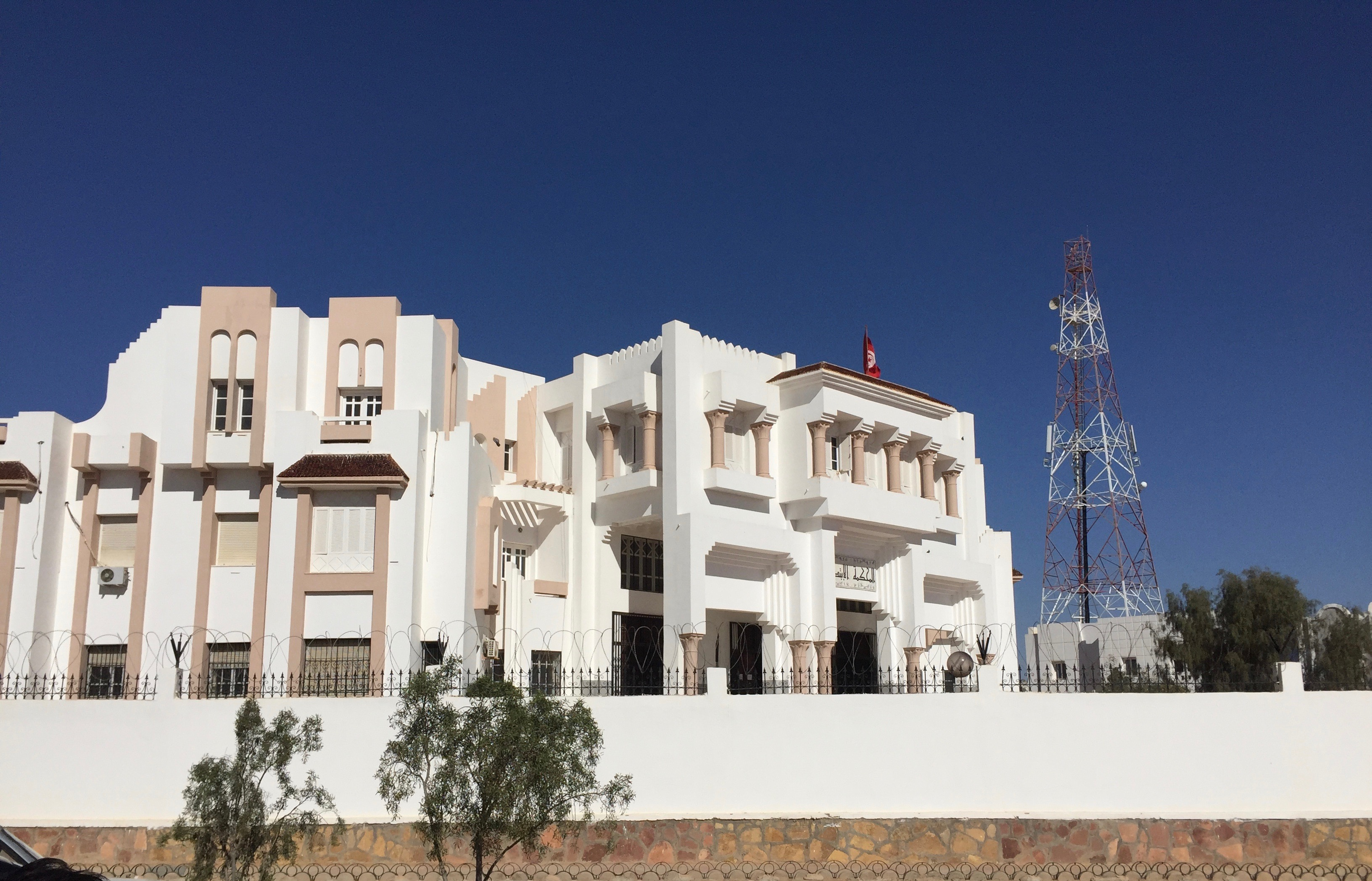
