= List of ksour in Tunisia =

The list of ksars (Arabic: ksour) in Tunisia is established by Herbert Popp and Abdelfettah Kassah and published in their book Les ksour du Sud tunisien : atlas illustré d'un patrimoine culturel in 2010.

It lists 92 ksour, i.e. almost all of the country's buildings – distributed between the governorates of Medenine and Tataouine over an area between Koutine to the north, Ksar Zorgane to the east, Remada to the south and Beni Khedache to the west – except for a few isolated works such as Ksar Sidi Makhlouf, Ksar Morra or Ksar Dhehibat.

== Medenine Governorate ==
=== Beni Khedache Delegation ===
Name	Other names	Picture	Coordinates	Closest location	Status	References
Ksar Boulassouar		Ksar Boulassouar	33°19.043′N 10°08.495′E	Moggor	In ruins	
Ksar El Bhayra		Ksar El Bhayra	33°19.107′N 10°13.491′E	El Bhayra	Good condition	
Ksar Jedid Gharbi		Ksar Jedid Gharbi	33°18.055′N 10°17.651′E	Ksar Jedid	Restored	
Ksar Jedid Chergui		Ksar Jedid Chergui	33°18.065′N 10°17.708′E	Ksar Jedid	Partially restored	
Ksar Hallouf	Ksar El Hallouf	Ksar Hallouf	33°17.471′N 10°09.429′E	El Medhhar	Partially restored	
Ksar Barzalia		Ksar Barzalia	33°16.577′N 10°10.224′E	Zammour	Partially collapsed	
Ksar Ouled Ben Youssef		Ksar Ouled Ben Youssef	33°16.360′N 10°15.001′E	Demmer	Completely ruined	
Ksar Zammour	Ksar Zemmour, Ksar Ras Zammour	Ksar Zammour	33°16.081′N 10°11.953′E	Zammour	Restored	
Ksar El Khyr	Ksar El Khir, Ksar El Khiyir	Ksar El Khyr	33°15.118′N 10°09.582′E	El Khyr	In ruins	
Ksar Ouled Brahim		Ksar Ouled Brahim	33°15.712′N 10°10.329′E	El Khyr	More or less in ruins	
Ksar Beni Khedache		Ksar Beni Khedache	33°15.036′N 10°12.022′E	Beni Khedache	Good condition	
Ksar El Kharba	Ksar Kherba, Ksar Khirba, Ksar El Khirba, Ksar Jedid El Lemalma	Ksar El Kharba	33°16.787′N 10°13.025′E	Demmer	Partially in ruins	
Ksar Jouamaa		Ksar Jouamaa	33°15.049′N 10°15.486′E	Beni Khedache	Partially in ruins	
Ksar Krikrya	Ksar Kerikeria, Ksar Kroukiria, Ksar Krakria	Ksar Krikrya	33°14.595′N 10°20.0442′E	Kroukiria	Good condition	
Ksar Ouled Bouabid	Ksar El Fjayej	Ksar Ouled Bouabid	33°14.281′N 10°10.262′E	Beni Khedache	Completely ruined	
Ksar El Mhadha	Ksar El Krerada	Ksar El Mhadha	33°12.756′N 10°11.262′E	Mhadha	Completely ruined	
Ksar Smoumnia		Ksar Smoumnia	33°12.662′N 10°19.481′E	Ouerjijen	Completely ruined	
Ksar Ouerjijen	Ksar Mansour, Ksar Ourjijen, Ksar Werjijen	Ksar Ouerjijen	33°12.580′N 10°21.672′E	Ouerjijen	Good condition	
Ksar Abiar Oued El Khil		Ksar Abiar Oued El Khil	33°10.820′N 10°15.265′E	Ksar Abiar Oued El Khil	Good condition	
Ksar El Kherachfa	Ksar Krerachefa	Ksar El Kherachfa	33°11.313′N 10°17.554′E	Ksar Abiar Oued El Khil	Degraded	
Ksar Ouled Mohamed Ben Ammar	Ksar Mohamed Ben Ammar Mahdaoui, Ksar Ouled Mehdi	Ksar Ouled Mohamed Ben Ammar	33°11.014′N 10°17.098′E	Ksar Abiar Oued El Khil	In ruins	
Ksar Jra		Ksar Jra	33°08.862′N 10°13.542′E	Jraa	Degraded	
Ksar Ouled Mehdi	Ksar El Ouzeghna	Ksar Ouled Mehdi	33°09.466′N 10°14.201′E	Jraa	Partially in ruins	

=== Medenine Nord Delegation ===
Name	Other names	Picture	Coordinates	Closest location	Status	References
Ksar Ghbonten	Ksar Eghbenten, Ksar Reboutin	Ksar Ghbonten	33°23.592′N 10°26.329′E	Koutine	In ruins	
Ksar Ouled Abdallah	Ksar Gueblaoui	Ksar Ouled Abdallah	33°22.138′N 10°26.220′E	Metameur	Partially restored	
Ksar El Khoukha		Ksar El Khoukha	33°22.179′N 10°26.224′E	Metameur	Completely ruined	
Ksar Essouk		Ksar Essouk	33°22.206′N 10°26.221′E	Metameur	Degraded	
Ksar El Ghoula		Ksar El Ghoula	33°22.111′N 10°26.184′E	Metameur	Completely ruined	
Ksar Ouled Meftah		Ksar Ouled Meftah	33°22.164′N 10°26.250′E	Metameur	Partially restored	
Ksar Ouled Brahim	Ksar Medenine, Ksar Touazine, Ksar Orouch	Ksar Ouled Brahim	33°20.830′N 10°29.549′E	Medenine	Completely restored	
Ksar Ommarsia		Ksar Ommarsia	33°20.847′N 10°29.524′E	Medenine	Well restored	
Ksar Lobbeira		Ksar Lobbeira	33°20.847′N 10°29.490′E	Medenine	Well restored	

== Tataouine Governorate ==
=== Bir Lahmar Delegation ===
Name	Other names	Picture	Coordinates	Closest location	Status	References
Ksar Bir Lahmar	Ksar Ababsa	Ksar Bir Lahmar	33°10.750′N 10°26.564′E	Bir Lahmar	Good condition	
Ksar Temzayet	Ksar Ababsa	Ksar Temzayet	33°08.849′N 10°21.750′E	Bir Lahmar	Partially in ruins	
Ksar Laaraf		Ksar Laaraf	33°08.063′N 10°23.023′E	Bir Lahmar	Degraded	
Ksar Ouled Boubaker		Ksar Ouled Boubaker	33°08.885′N 10°26.899′E	Bir Lahmar	Good condition	
Ksar Bayouli (Oued Graguer)		Ksar Bayouli (Oued Graguer)	33°07.108′N 10°24.261′E	Graguer	In ruins	
Ksar Zhahfa	Ksar Ababsa, Ksar El Zhahfeh, Ksar Zhaifa	Ksar Zhahfa	33°06.479′N 10°23.295′E	Bir Lahmar	Degraded	

=== Ghomrassen Delegation ===
Name	Other names	Picture	Coordinates	Closest location	Status	References
Ksar Hadada	Ksar Hadadda	Ksar Hadada	33°06.016′N 10°18.848′E	Ksar Hadada	Well restored	
Ksar Beni Ghedir	Ksar Beni Khedir	Ksar Beni Ghédir	33°05.152′N 10°21.145′E	Ghomrassen	Good condition	
Ksar Bayouli		]Ksar Bayouli	33°05.086′N 10°22.200′E	Ghomrassen	Degraded	
Ksar Boughali		Ksar Boughali	33°03.650′N 10°20.267′E	Ghomrassen	Degraded	
Ksar El Rosfa	Ksar Lesafri, Ksar Rousfa	Ksar El Rosfa	33°03.204′N 10°20.081′E	Ghomrassen	Good condition	
Ksar Mrabtine		Ksar Mrabtine	33°01.921′N 10°22.653′E	El Mrabtine	Completely restored	
Ksar El Ferch		Ksar El Ferch	33°00.394′N 10°20.573′E	Ghomrassen	Partially restored	
Ksar Guermessa	Ksar Guermassa	Ksar Guermessa	32°59.049′N 10°15.117′E	Guermessa	In ruins	

=== Smar Delegation ===
Name	Other names	Picture	Coordinates	Closest location	Status	References
Ksar El Gaah	Ksar El Ghaar, Ksar Ouled El Haj	Ksar El Gaah	33°03.935′N 10°48.592′E	Kerchaou	In ruins	
Ksar Bougoffa	Ksar Bougouffa	Ksar Bougoffa	33°03.351′N 10°55.669′E	Kerchaou	In ruins	
Ksar Kerchaou	Ksar Khirchaou, Ksar Kerchaw	Ksar Kerchaou	33°02.013′N 10°47.822′E	Kerchaou	Good condition	
Ksar Kerrouz		Ksar Kerrouz	33°01.287′N 10°50.182′E	Smar	Good condition	
Ksar Ghariani	Ksar Nfaissia	Ksar Ghariani	32°59.726′N 10°54.476′E	Smar	Partially restored	
Ksar Bhir	Ksar B'Hir	Ksar Bhir	32°58.216′N 10°39.672′E	Bhir	Good condition	
Ksar Beni Mhira (El Ataya)	Ksar El Ataya	Ksar Beni Mhira (El Ataya)	32°52.365′N 10°49.217′E	Beni Mhira	Degraded	
Ksar Beni Mhira (Zorgane)	Ksar Ouled Mheri	Ksar Beni Mhira (Zorgane)	32°52.435′N 10°49.558′E	Beni Mhira	Degraded	
Ksar El Amerna	El Amerna (Beni Mhira)	Ksar El Amerna	32°51.930′N 10°52.258′E	Beni Mhira	Degraded	
Ksar Ouled Oun (Beni Mhira)	Ksar El Guein	Ksar Ouled Oun	32°52.057′N 10°53.156′E	Beni Mhira	Good condition	
Ksar El Ain	Ksar El Dhibbene, Ksar Ech Charchera	Ksar El Ain	32°54.469′N 10°57.125′E	Beni Mhira	Partially restored	

=== Tataouine Nord Delegation ===
Name	Other names	Picture	Coordinates	Closest location	Status	References
Ksar Tlalet Ech Chehbane	Ksar Ech Chehbane, Ksar Tlelet, Ksar Tlalet	Ksar Tlalet Ech Chehbane	32°59.027′N 10°23.050′E	Tlalet	Completely restored	
Ksar Ajerda	Ksar Jelidet	Ksar Ajerda	32°53.890′N 10°29.265′E	Gattoufa	Degraded	
Ksar Jlalta		Ksar Jlalta	32°53.824′N 10°29.359′E	Gattoufa	Partially restored	
Ksar Ouled Abdelwahed	Ksar Ouled Abd El Ouahaa	Ksar Ouled Abdelwahed	32°54.237′N 10°31.429′E	New Gattoufa	Partially restored	
Ksar Ouled Boujlida	Ksar Ouesti, Ksar El Rousti, Ksar Abdallah, Ksar El Wostani	Ksar Ouled Boujlida	32°54.237′N 10°31.429′E	New Gattoufa	Partially restored	
Ksar Ouled M'hemed	Ksar Ouled Mahmed, Ksar Beni Blel	Ksar Ouled M'hemed	32°53.872′N 10°31.508′E	New Gattoufa	Partially restored	
Ksar Khatma	Ksar El M'hamid, Ksar Hamedia, Ksar Hriza	Ksar Khatma	32°51.063′N 10°32.549′E	El Khatma	Degraded	
Ksar Bou Harida	Ksar Bou-H'Rida, Ksar Zorgane	Ksar Bou Harida	32°52.123′N 10°33.539′E	El Khatma	In ruins	
Ksar Beni Yakhzer	Ksar Ben Khezer, Ksar Ikhzeur	Ksar Beni Yakhzer	32°51.053′N 10°34.710′E	El Khatma	Completely ruined	
Ksar Rodha	Khirba of Zitarna	Ksar Rodha	32°49.246′N 10°33.814′E	Ez Zahra	Completely ruined	
Ksar Ez Zahra	Ksar Kherba, Ksar Krachoua, Ksar Krachwa	Ksar Ez Zahra	32°49.009′N 10°33.953′E	Ez Zahra	Restored	
Ksar Essaada	Ksar Ajej	Ksar Essaada	32°48.223′N 10°40.536′E	Essaada	Good condition	
Ksar Zorgane	Ksar Chgeyeg, Ksar Jedid	Ksar Zorgane	32°40.651′N 10°53.937′E	Beni Mhira	Partially restored	
Ksar Chgeyeg (Hamidia)		Ksar Chgeyeg (Hamidia)	32°39.406′N 10°52.244′E	Beni Mhira	Good condition	
Ksar Chgeyeg (Krechoua)		Ksar Chgeyeg (Krechoua)	32°39.478′N 10°52.184′E	Beni Mhira	Good condition	

=== Tataouine Sud Delegation ===
Name	Other names	Picture	Coordinates	Closest location	Status	References
Ksar Meguebla	Ksar Mguebleh	Ksar Meguebla	32°55.573′N 10°25.603′E	Tataouine	Restored	
Ksar Dghaghra (Ouled Abdallah)	Ksar Tataouine	Ksar Dghaghra (Ouled Abdallah)	32°55.269′N 10°26.521′E	Tataouine	Completely restored	
Ksar Chenini		Ksar Chenini	32°54.738′N 10°15.725′E	Chenini	Degraded	
Ksar Ghorghar		]Ksar Ghorghar	32°54.484′N 10°26.498′E	Tataouine	Degraded	
Ksar Boujlida		Ksar Boujlida	32°54.485′N 10°26.455′E	Tataouine	Degraded	
Ksar Beni Barka		Ksar Beni Barka	32°53.177′N 10°26.047′E	Maztouria	Completely ruined	
Ksar Tounket		Ksar Tounket	32°52.941′N 10°29.895′E	Tounket	Degraded	
Ksar Douiret		Ksar Douiret	32°52.135′N 10°17.187′E	Douiret	Completely ruined	
Ksar Ouled Debbab		Ksar Ouled Debbab	32°52.176′N 10°22.904′E	Masreb	Partially restored	
Ksar Ouled Oun (Maztouria)	Ksar Zenndag	Ksar Ouled Oun	32°51.826′N 10°28.325′E	Maztouria	Restored	
Ksar Aouadid		Ksar Aouadid	32°51.889′N 10°28.262′E	Maztouria	Completely restored	
Ksar El Kedim	Ksar of Zenata, Ksar Khalifa Zenati	Ksar El Kedim	32°50.868′N 10°28.062′E	Maztouria	Restored	
Ksar Dghaghra	Ksar Rekhaissa	Ksar Dghaghra	32°50.489′N 10°28.094′E	Maztouria	Completely restored	
Ksar Maaned	Ksar M'Aned	Ksar Maaned	32°49.579′N 10°30.994′E	Ez Zahra	Degraded	
Ksar Bouziri		Ksar Bouziri	32°48.374′N 10°27.305′E	Bouziri	In ruins	
Ksar Ouled Abd Essayed	Ksar Sirfine	Ksar Ouled Abd Essayed	32°48.455′N 10°28.882′E	Sirfine	Degraded	
Ksar Tamelest	Ksar El Ghoula, Ksar Ouled Chehida	Ksar Tamelest	32°47.629′N 10°28.360′E	Tamelest	In ruins	
Ksar Ouled Soltane		Ksar Ouled Soltane	32°47.312′N 10°30.874′E	Ouled Soltane	Completely restored	
Ksar Remtha		Ksar Remtha	32°44.050′N 10°28.729′E	Remtha	Good condition	
Ksar El Mourra Dghaghra	Ksar Dghaghra, Ksar El Mourra	Ksar El Mourra Dghaghra	32°30.935′N 10°23.768′E	Bir Mourra	Completely restored	

== Bibliography ==
- Popp, Herbert; Kassah, Abdelfettah (2010). Les ksour du Sud tunisien : atlas illustré d'un patrimoine culturel (in French). Bayreuth: Naturwissenschaftliche Gesellschaft Bayreuth. ISBN 978-3-939-14604-9.
