= Yahyaoui =

Yahyaoui may refer to:

== People ==
- Abdelmalik Yahyaoui (born 1998), French rapper
- Amira Yahyaoui (born 1984), Tunisian entrepreneur, blogger and human rights activist
- Insaf Yahyaoui (born 1981), Tunisian judoka
- Mokhtar Yahyaoui (1952–2015), Tunisian judge and human rights activist
- Zouhair Yahyaoui (1967–2005), Tunisian blogger

== Other uses ==
- Yahyaoui barbel, species of fish
