= Abdallah al-Tijani =

14th-century Moroccan official and author

Abū Muḥammad ʿAbd Allāh ibn Muḥammad ibn Aḥmad al-Tijānī (fl. 1275–1311) was a chancery official and author in the Hafsid Caliphate. He is best known for his Riḥla, an account of his travels in 1306–1309 and a detailed description of the land between Tunis and Tripoli.

== Life ==
Al-Tijānī's family was of Moroccan origin. His great-great-grandfather Abu ʾl-Qāsim is said to have come to Tunis after it was conquered by the Almohad caliph Abd al-Mu'min in 1159. The last known member of the family, Aḥmad ibn Muḥammad al-Tijānī, died in 1464.

Al-Tijānī studied first under his father and later under Abū Bakr ibn ʿAbd al-Karīm al-ʿŪfī; Abu ʾl-Qāsim al-Kalāʿī, author of the Sīra al-kalāʿiyya; and Abū ʿAlī ʿUmar. He had an ample personal library and access to the Hafsid library. Among works he is known to have possessed are the Sīra al-nabawiyya of Ibn Isḥāq, Yaḥyā ibn Sallām's commentary on the Qurʾān and the ʿUmda of Ibn Rashīq.

Al-Tijānī entered the Hafsid chancery during the reign of Abū ʿAṣīda Muḥammad II (1295–1309). He left to become a secretary and later chief secretary for Abū Yaḥyā Zakariyyāʾ al-Liḥyānī. He accompanied al-Liḥyānī as his chief secretary on his military expedition in 1306–1307. In July or August 1308, when al-Liḥyānī set out from Tripoli on his Ḥajj, al-Tijānī returned to Tunis. When al-Liḥyānī was acclaimed caliph in November 1311, he named al-Tijānī as the head of the chancery. This is the last that is heard of al-Tijānī and it has been mooted that he may have died in the battle of Siliana in 1318.

== Works ==
Al-Tijānī is known to have written at least nine works, but six are thought to be lost. Of the remaining three, two have been published.

=== Riḥla ===
The Riḥla belongs to the genre of the same name. It is an account of al-Tijānī's 32-month journey from Tunis to Tripoli and back, first published with a French translation in 1852–1853 and in a critical edition by Hassan Husni Abd al-Wahhab in 1958. It includes valuable quotations from lost works and documents, including the works of some poets of Tunis.

The original plan behind the journey was that al-Liḥyānī would conduct military operations and then meet a caravan returning from Morocco and travel with it to Egypt before continuing on to Mecca. The Riḥla begins with the march of the army from Tunis to Gabès in two weeks in late 1306. From January to April 1307, campaigns were launched against Djerba and Tozeur. On 1 May, the army was sent back to Tunis while al-Tijānī remained with al-Liḥyānī in the vicinity of Gabès. Because of an outbreak of disease at Gabès, al-Liḥyānī accepted the invitation of the chief of the Mahāmīd to host them at Ghomrassen, a four days' journey away. They first followed the coastal road for two days through Teboulbou and Mareth to a place called Ajāss near Metameur. They then turned inland. Finding Ghomrassen ill-suited to camping after a month, they built a permanent house and stayed there another two months.

At Ghomrassen, al-Liḥyānī fell ill and reports were received of a serious epidemic between Tripoli and Barqa. They were also informed that the Moroccan sultan, Abū Yaʿqūb Yūsuf, had been assassinated, almost certainly delaying the return of the diplomatic caravan. In September, the party set out for Tripoli to await the caravan there. They travelled for four days eastwards to Tādhir in Jawārī territory. Accepting the invitation of the Jawārī chief, al-Liḥyānī detoured to Zanzūr, five days away. Al-Tijānī describes the villages and zāwiyas and the ruins of Sabratha that they passed along the way.

At Zanzūr, al-Liḥyānī was informed by the chief of the Banū Sālim that his safety could not be guaranteed through his territory on account of rebellions. He decided to move his party to Tripoli, where it stayed in the dilapidated citadel for the next eighteen months. Al-Tijānī describes the city in great detail. In June 1309, the caravan arrived from Morocco and the party set out for Egypt. Five days later, al-Tijānī fell ill. The entire caravan camped for five days waiting for him to recover before al-Liḥyānī advised him to go home. He travelled on the next day, but was unable to mount a horse and chose to return to Tunis. He was escorted back by the same escort that had accompanied the caravan from Tunis. The return journey took four weeks. He calculated his absence from Tunis as 970 days.

=== Other works ===
- Tuhfat al-ʿarūs wa-nuzhat mutʿat al-nufūs, a work of advice on choosing a beautiful wife and attaining marital happiness, first published with a French translation in 1848 and more recently in 1992
- al-Wafāʿ bi-bayān fawāʿid al-Shifāʿ (unpublished), a commentary on the Shifāʿ bi-tarʿīf ḥuqūq al-Muṣṭafā of Qāḍī ʿIyāḍ
- Adāʾ al-lāzim (lost), a commentary in 1000 lines on Ḥāzim al-Karṭājannī's poem praising the Hafsid caliph al-Mustanṣir
- al-Durr al-nāẓim fi ʾl-adab wa ʾl-tarājim (lost), on Hafsid poets and belletrists
- Nafaḥāt al-nisrīn (lost), a collection of his correspondence with Ibn Shibrīn
- ʿAlāmat al-karāma fī karāmat al-ʿalāma (lost), on Hafsid secretaries and secretaryship
- Aḥkām al-nikāḥ (lost)
- a lost collection of notes on the Ṣaḥīḥ al-Bukhārī and Ṣaḥīḥ Muslim

== Bibliography ==
- Brett, Michael (1976). "The Journey of al-Tijānī to Tripoli at the Beginning of the Fourteenth Century A.D./Eighth Century A.H.". Libyan Studies. 7: 41–51. doi:10.1017/s0263718900008992. S2CID 164780725.
- Garnier, Sébastien (2008). "Le récit de voyage d'Abdallah Tijani (1306–1309) est-il un ouvrage politique ?". In Henri Bresc; Denis Menjot (eds.). Les voyageurs au Moyen Âge. Comité des travaux historiques et scientifiques. pp. 61–70.
- King, Matthew (2018). The Norman Kingdom of Africa and the Medieval Mediterranean (PDF) (PhD diss.). University of Minnesota.
- Plessner, M. & El Achèche, Taïeb (2000). "al-Tid̲j̲ānī". In Bearman, P. J.; Bianquis, Th.; Bosworth, C. E.; van Donzel, E. & Heinrichs, W. P. (eds.). The Encyclopaedia of Islam, Second Edition. Volume X: T–U. Leiden: E. J. Brill. pp. 462–463. ISBN 978-90-04-11211-7.
- Rousseau, Alphonse, ed. (1853). Voyage du Scheikh et-Tidjani dans la régence de Tunis, pendant les années 706, 707 et 708 de l'Hégire (1306–1309). Imprimerie Impériale.
