= Alice Barbe =

French social entrepreneur (born 1987)

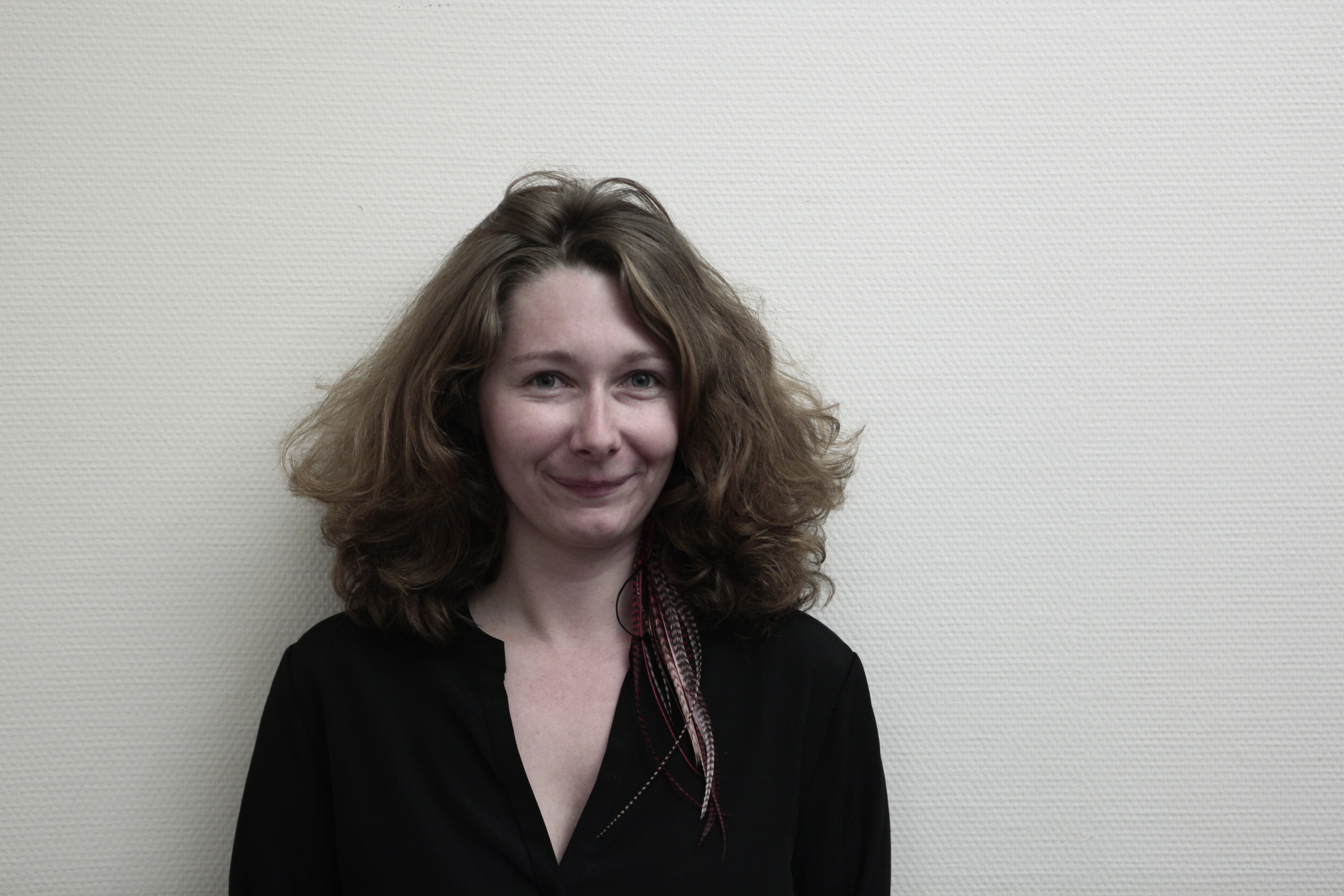
- Born: Alice Barbe; 9 June 1987 (age 39); Paris, France
- Occupation: Social entrepreneur
- Known for: community worker

Alice Barbe (born 9 June 1987) is a French social entrepreneur, currently President of the Academy for Future Leaders in France. She is known in particular for her social and feminist commitments, in favor of refugees and against cyber-harassment. Her work has been recognised by the Obama Foundation, where she participated in the very first cohort of Obama Scholars at Columbia University in 2018–2019; Ashoka Foundation and Aga Khan Foundation.

Alice Barbe is particularly known for having co-founded SINGA, an international non profit that promotes civic engagement on migration led innovation.

She is an author and recognised as an expert in the field of inclusion and good global governance.

== Early life and education ==
Born in Paris on 9 June 1987, Alice grew up next to Béziers. She holds a law degree from the University of Law Montpellier, completed with the Erasmus Programme at the University of Political Sciences of Copenhagen, and a European master's degree in Political Sciences that she completed in the Universities of Siena, Kraków, Montpellier and the Institute of European Studies in Strasbourg. She worked at the Secretariat of the Convention for Biological Diversity in Montreal, for the United Nations Environment Programme before launching SINGA in France.

== Career ==
=== Singa ===
In 2012, she joined Nathanael Molle and Guillaume Capelle who have just launched SINGA, after having been disappointed by her experience at the UN. They start Singa as a movement to promote migration led innovation, including digital innovations, which led to the creation of the first hosting platform for refugees in 2015 in France. Singa becomes an international organization as it scales in several European countries and creates incubators to support entrepreneurship in migration, addressing specifically entrepreneurs with a migrant background. In 2022, Singa counts chapters in 7 countries and more than 100 employees.

In 2018, Alice receives the Social Entrepreneur Award from the Office Franco-Québécois pour la jeunesse (OFQJ) and is selected as Obama Scholar, Emerging Leader by the Obama Foundation, which offers her a sabbatical year in New York at Columbia University. In 2019, she accepted the Global Pluralism Award by the Global Pluralism Center in Ottawa on behalf of SINGA.

Barbe served as the CEO of Singa France until 2020 and CEO of Singa Global, the organization's central office, that was created after the scaling of Singa in 7 countries in Europe and Canada. She regularly speaks out to denounce refugees' stigmatization, and to encourage more inclusion for entrepreneurs with a migrant background. On International Women Day in 2019, President Barack Obama highlights her work on Twitter.

=== Activism ===
Alice Barbe is a regular speaker at public events such as TED conferences, the 2019 edition of Solidays Festival and various podcasts, including Missing America hosted by Ben Rhodes, Obama's former speech writer. In addition, she was a civil society candidate in the 2015 French regional elections on the list of the French Green Party, Europe Écologie - Les Verts (EÉLV). She is particularly committed to the environmental cause and a more responsible society, notably with the ″Crazy Toad movement″, for which she participated in the drafting of the ″Manifeste du crapaud fou″ (Manifesto of the Crazy Toad) along with Thanh Nghiem and Cédric Villani.

She also participated in the creation of the association #StopHarcèlementdeRue in Paris, which launched a campaign against harassment in public transports in 2015, leading to a national plan to combat this phenomenon by the French High Council for Gender Equality. As a result of her various positions, Alice Barbe regularly receives numerous cyber-harassment attacks and in 2016, following an interview with the French media Libération, the article is shared by Fdesouche, a far-right website, which led her to receive nearly 360 death and rape threats within a few hours. Following her complaint, she won her case against five defendants accused of public insult on the grounds of sex.

In 2020, Alice Barbe was elected to the board of directors of Mouvement Impact France and works to promote social business in the private and public sectors.

Following the tragic incident in Moria refugee camp in June 2020, she called for French mayors to take the initiative to welcome refugees directly from the camp.

In 2021, Barbe was featured in the documentary #SalePute, by Florence Hainaut and Myriam Leroy to raise awareness on online misogyny.

Her first book was published by Éditions de L'Observatoire in 2021, in French, titled "On ne naît pas engagé, on le devient - Nous avons tous le choix ", i.e. We are not born engaged, we become - We all have the choice. Barbe strongly defends the inclusion in society of migrants and refugees, as a tremendous opportunity and an essential human commitment. “The world today has 70 million refugees. In 2050, they will be 300 million. How to move from welcoming to cohesion? Between sensationalist hashtags that divide more than they unite and a political world often tempted by hypernationalist rhetoric, the alternatives are numerous." Alice Barbe notes in her book.

In August 2021, Barbe helped the French government in evacuating afghan refugees, and participated to the rescue of nearly 120 afghan people. In 2022, she launches a civic led mobilization to support evacuation for people fleeing Ukraine.

=== Launch of the Academy for Future Leaders ===
In 2022, Alice Barbe leaves her position of CEO of SINGA, handling over to former presidential candidate Benoit Hamon, and co-found a new organization with Michka Bengio, the Academy for Future Leaders, to support civic leaders willing to enter politics. For this, she received the award of Young Positive Leader from Jacques Attali in February 2022. With the academy, they intend to support civic leaders with track record in fighting for social justice to enter the political arena. The first cohort counts 13 participants, including Priscillia Ludosky, co-founder of the Yellow Vests movement, Clélia Compas, a humanitarian activist, or Stephane Ravacley, a baker famous for his hunger strike to protest against deportation of his apprentice.

The academy offers intensive classes on public policy, leadership, personal development, and hosts sessions with political leaders such as former French President François Hollande, co-founder of Justice Democrats Zack Exley, or Tunisian activist Omezzine Khelifa.

== Publications ==
- "On ne nait pas engagé, on le devient", Editions de l'Observatoire, 2021
- Le numérique pour repenser l’impact de la migration, Enjeux Numériques n°6, Les Annales des Mines, 2019.
- Le manifeste du crapaud fou (ouvrage collectif), 2018. ISBN 979-1097160043
- Révolution responsable: Partageons les solutions d'aujourd'hui aux problèmes de demain (ouvrage collectif), 2017.
- Alice Barbe, Health and Biodiversity: the political imperative for Rio+20, Economologos, vol. III, année II, September 2012.
- Alice Barbe, Natural Capitalism and Biodiversity's protection in the EU, Economologos, vol. II, année II, February 2012.
