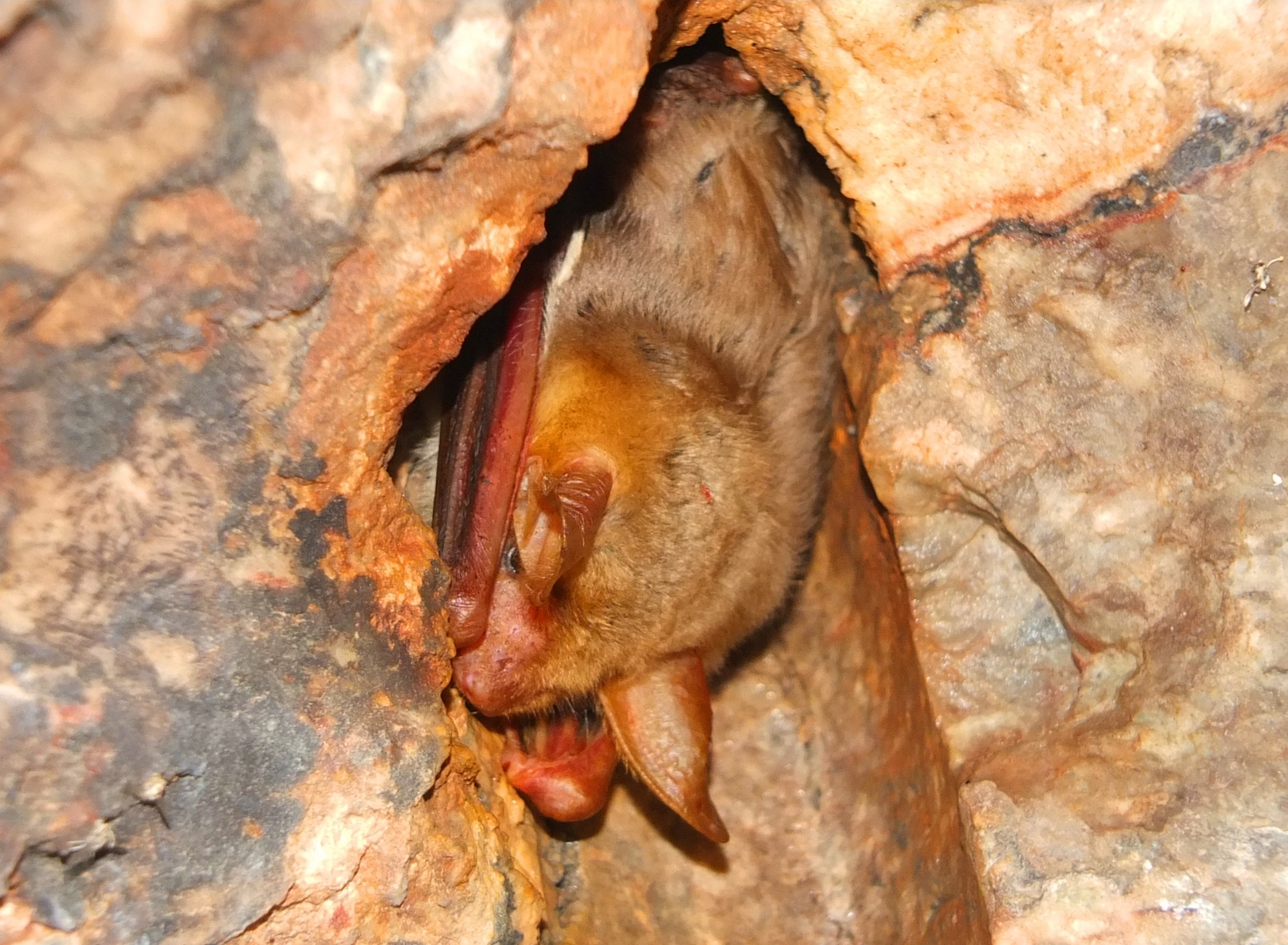

Conservation status
- Data Deficient (IUCN 3.1)

Scientific classification
- Kingdom: Animalia
- Phylum: Chordata
- Class: Mammalia
- Order: Chiroptera
- Family: Vespertilionidae
- Genus: Myotis
- Species: M. punicus

Binomial name
- Myotis punicus Felten, 1977
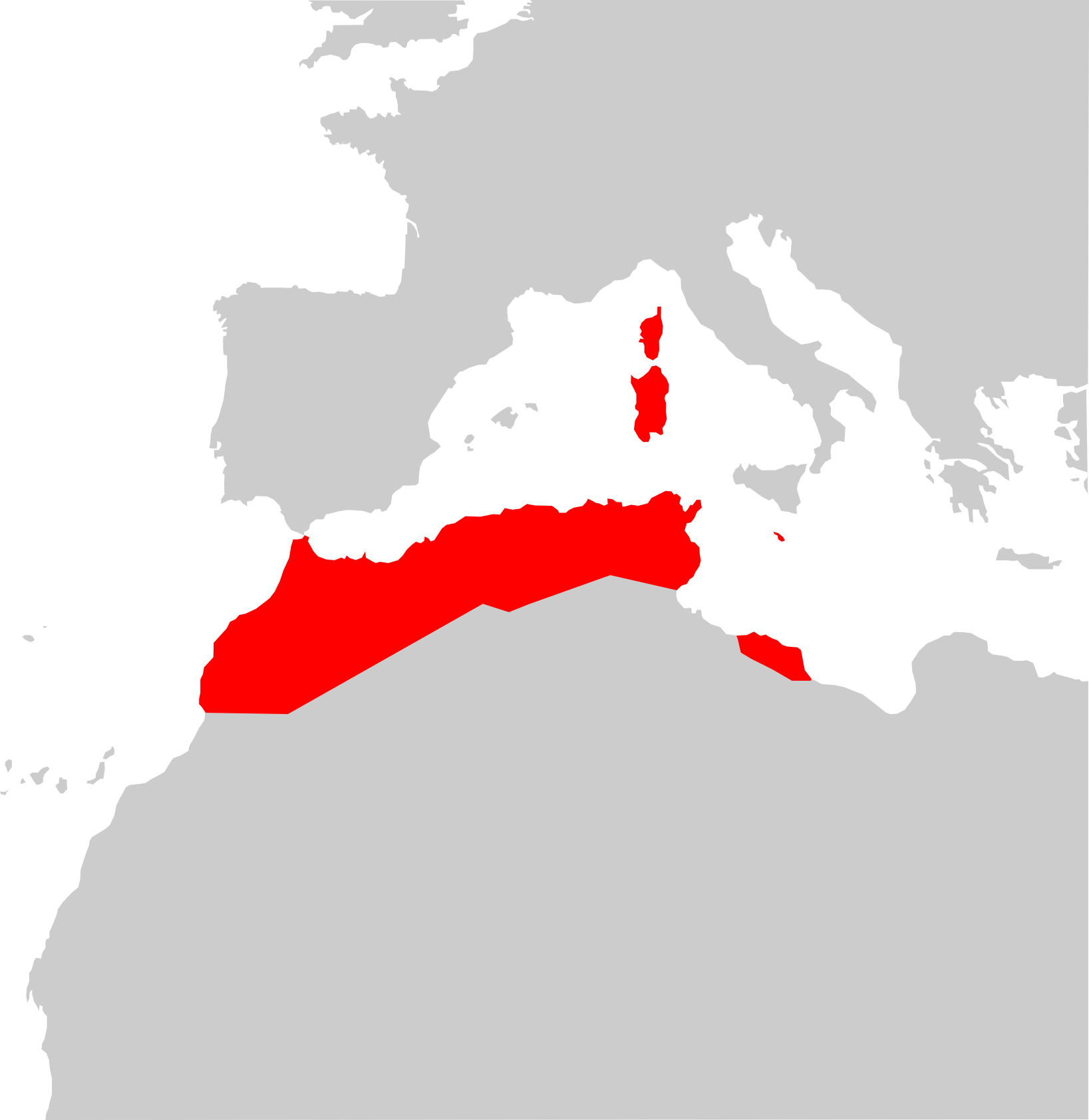

= Felten's myotis =

Species of bat

The Felten's myotis (Myotis punicus) is a species of vesper bat.

== Taxonomy and evolution ==
Myotis blythii punicus was first described by Felten in 1977 as a subspecies of Myotis blythii based on differences in the teeth. Later genetic and geometric morphometric analyses elevated it to a full species based on genetic differences and skull shape. Genetic analysis suggests that the two species diverged over 3 million years ago, in the Pliocene.

== Distribution ==
It is found in Northern Africa in Algeria, Libya, Malta, Morocco, Tunisia; and the islands of Corsica, Sardinia, and Malta. The north African population is genetically and morphologically distinct from the island population, and the east African population genetically distinct from the west African. Genetic data suggests that it colonized the islands from mainland Africa.

The total population is over 10,000 individuals, but the precise number is unclear, and it is listed as a data deficient species by the IUCN. The Sardinian population consisted of an estimated 19 large colonies in 1999, while the Corsican one is 4 colonies (an estimated 3000 individual bats). The Maltese population was estimated at only 200 individuals in 2009.

Its natural habitats are temperate forests, temperate shrubland, subtropical or tropical dry shrubland, Mediterranean-type shrubby vegetation, temperate grassland, caves, subterranean habitats (other than caves), arable land, rural gardens, and irrigated land. The habitat range extends to the border of the Sahara desert. In Tunisia, the species has been observed as far south as Ghomrassen or the Bou-Hedma National Park.

== Behaviour and ecology ==
The species - at least as far as specimens roosting in Northern Tunisia are concerned - seems able to give birth much earlier in the spring than the closely related species Myotis myotis or M. blythii in Europe or Western Asia: Individuals born that year and able to fly were observed in el Haouariya caves May 24, 2011, (i.e. these juveniles were born between 3 and 4 weeks prior).

Hybrids of Felten's myotis and M. blythii punicus have sometimes been found in the wild.

Felten's myotis primarily hunts beetles and other hardbodied insects. It roosts in caves during the day, and forms colonies of 300 to 500 bats.
