= Boubaker El Akhzouri =

Tunisian theologian and politician

Boubaker El Akhzouri (born 1 November 1948 in Béni Khedache) is a Tunisian theologian and politician. He was appointed Minister of Religious Affairs in the Ghannouchi government on 10 November 2004. In an interview with Assabah, he stated that the hijab is not consistent with Tunisian traditions, which caused considerable controversy in the Arabic media. Following the unrest in the region of Sidi Bouzid, a cabinet reshuffle was decided on 29 December 2010, which saw him replaced with Kamel Omrane.
