= Tieret =

- Location in Tunisia
- Coordinates: 31°02′N 10°11′E
- Country: Tunisia
- Governorate: Tataouine Governorate
- Time zone: UTC1 (CET)

Tieret is a city in Tunisia, part of Tataouine Governorate, located at 31.03°N, 10.17°E, elevation : 1220 ft
