= Omezzine Khelifa =

Tunisian politician

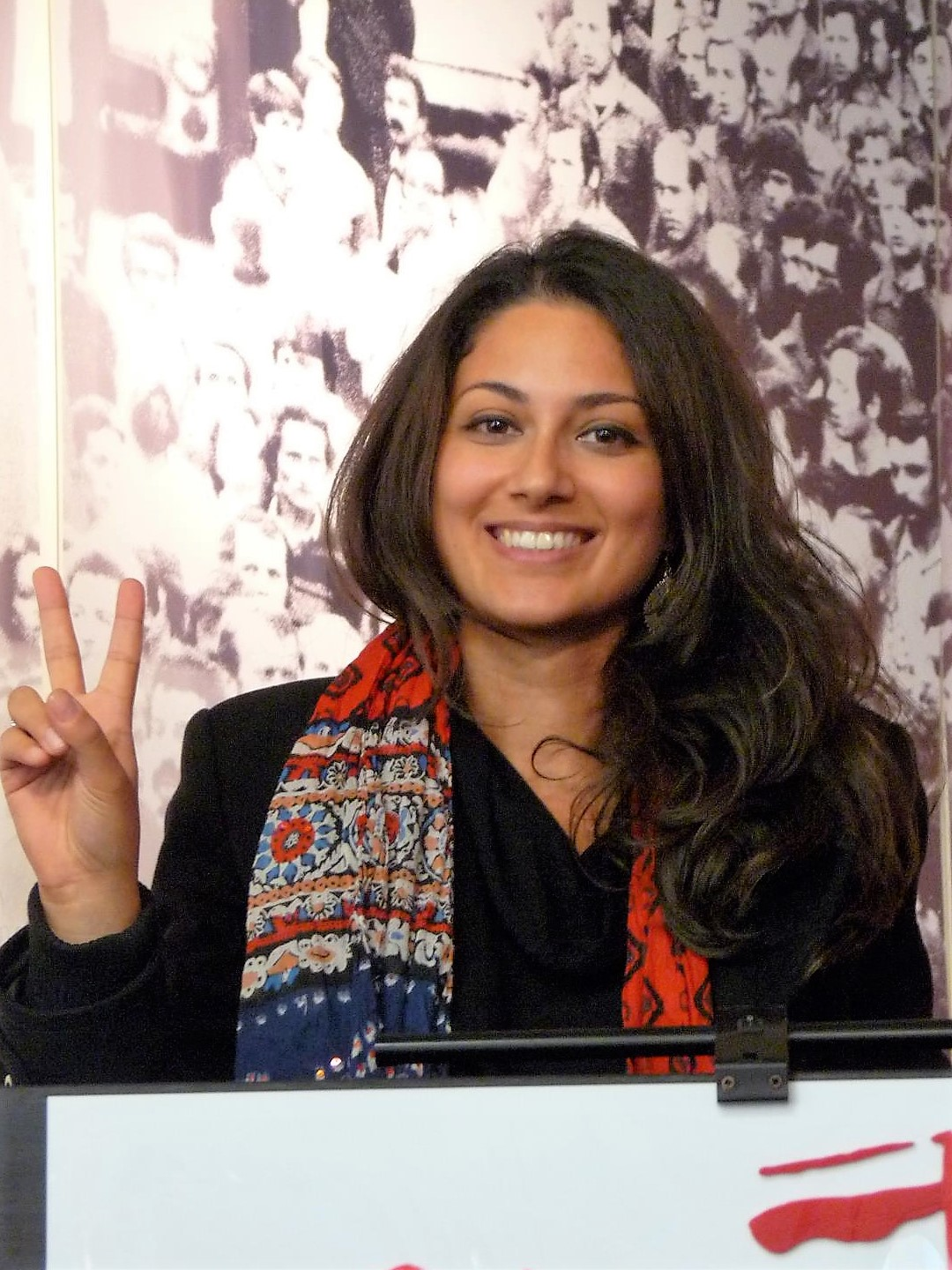
Omezzine Khelifa

Omezzine Khelifa (Arabic: أم الزين خليفة) is a Tunisian politician, activist, and social entrepreneur. Born on 7 July 1982 in Carthage she was raised in La Marsa in the northern suburb of Tunis. After earning her high school diploma in mathematics, she moved to France where she finished her studies as a telecommunications and computer science engineer, specialized in networks and distributed applications. She worked in the finance field as a consultant for Société Générale Investment Banking and fintech companies.

== Family ==
Omezzine was born and raised in a family of academia. Her father, Mounir Khelifa, is an English Literature Professor in the Faculty of Literature, Arts and Humanities in Tunis. Her mother, Amina Arfaoui, is a writer and a German Literature Professor. She has one brother, Melik Melek Khelifa who is a doctor and a singer, a guitar player and a music composer. Her brother along with his wife, Jelena Dobric, created Persona; a female fronted metal band in Tunisia.

== Political engagement and achievements ==
In 2011, Khelifa moved back to Tunisia after involving in the Tunisian Revolution. She joined the Tunisian political party Ettakatol, one of the Government coalition on that time. After twice running for Parliament and becoming an elected member of the political bureau, she was appointed adviser to the ministers of Tourism (2012–2013) and Finance (2013–2014). She served during two different transition governments formed after the first free and fair elections in the history of the country. Then, she became a Finance Consultant with the World Bank and coordinated the largest multi-donor trust fund assisting the Tunisian government in strengthening the financial sector, improving governance, and local governments.

As part of Khelifa's engagement in women's rights; she co-founded the women's branch of her political party then took part in 2013 in setting up Tha'era, an Arab Women Network for parity and solidarity. In March of the same year, she was announced by the Diplomatic Courrier as one of the Top Global Women. In 2015, she took part as well in setting the Women's Alliance for Security Leadership (WASL).

In 2014, The World Economic Forum released its new list of Young Global Leaders in which Omezzine Khelifa was announced as a YGL from the MENA region. Khelifa was the first Tunisian woman YGL she was followed by Lina Ben Mhenni in 2015, Amira Yahyaoui and the parliamentarian Wafa Makhlouf in 2016 and the Former Secretary of State, Ministry of Youth and Sports Faten Kallel in 2017.

In 2015, she became a Hammamet Conference Series fellow. Then she became a New Voices fellow in the Aspen Institute in the 2017 class and spoke in the Aspen Ideas Spotlight Health Festival about quelling violent extremism Omezzine Khelifa received the award of "Leaders for Democracy" given by the organisation Project on Middle East Democracy in 2012.

In 2016, Khelifa founded a social impact and civic innovation organization to think, mobilize and act for youth social, economic and political inclusion through arts, culture, sports and technology. Through Mobdiun - Creative Youth, they fight violent extremism by giving youth, issued from working-class neighborhoods in Tunis, a platform to perform and create new life opportunities.

In 2018 she became part of the inaugural group of Obama Foundation Scholars at Columbia University.

Omezzine Khelifa published her political views on several topics such as extremism in the World Economic Forum website and in Open Democracy. She also published a paper in the [Wilson International Center for Scholars] about Gender Equality after the Arab Uprising.

== Publications ==
=== Reports ===
- "Circular Power Politics, A Politician’s Guide to Five Opportunities to Lead With and For the People", co-authored with Jon Alexander with the Apolitical Foundation published on the Foundation's website, 2024
- "Leaders or Latecomers? Exploring the role of politicians in democratic innovation", co-authored with Jon Alexander with the Apolitical Foundation published on the Foundation's website, 2024
- "Being a teenager in Kram Ouest, Seven Years after the Revolution of January 14th, 2011 in Tunisia - A study on adolescence in a working-class neighborhood of Tunis", Mobdiun - Creative Youth, 2018 also published on the website of the Tunisian National Commission Fighting Terrorism CNLCT in its French version.

=== Articles ===
- "A Diplomatic Winter?", the Project Syndicate, 2022
- "Art saved me from jihad’ – tackling Tunisia’s extremism problem", the World Economic Forum, 2017
- "Eradicating violent extremism from Tunisia? Dry up the sources", Open Democracy, 2015
- "Reflections on Women in the Arab Spring", The Wilson Center, 2012
- "Universities first test for the Tunisian Constituent Assembly", the Daily News, 2012

=== Podcasts ===
- "Reimagining Government: Government in the Year of Elections", Centre for Public Impact, 2024
- "Crowd Wisdom and Optimism in Reshaping Democratic Processes", A Political Hope podcast with Australian MP Kate Chaney, 2024
- "Founding a Ministry of Citizen Participation", A Political Hope podcast with Ximena Peredo, 2023
- "Humility and Listening in Politics and Revolution", A Political Hope podcast, 2023
- "Is democracy in danger?", ELIAMEP Institute, 2023
- "Risks to Tunisia's Democracy", Carnegie Endowment for International Peace and POMED, 2019
