= Remada Air Base =

Air base in Tunisia

- IATA: none; ICAO: DTTD

Summary
- Airport type: Military
- Serves: Remada
- Elevation AMSL: 1,004 ft / 306 m
- Coordinates: 32°18′20″N 10°23′00″E

Map
- Location of the airport in Tunisia

Runways
Direction	Length		Surface
Direction	ft	m	Surface
02/20	7,875	2,400	Asphalt
- Source: Google Maps

Remada Air Base (ICAO: DTTD) is a military airport serving Remada in Tunisia.

== See also ==
- Transport in Tunisia
