= Ksar Hadada =

Village in Tunisia

Coordinates: 33°06′00″N 10°18′50″E

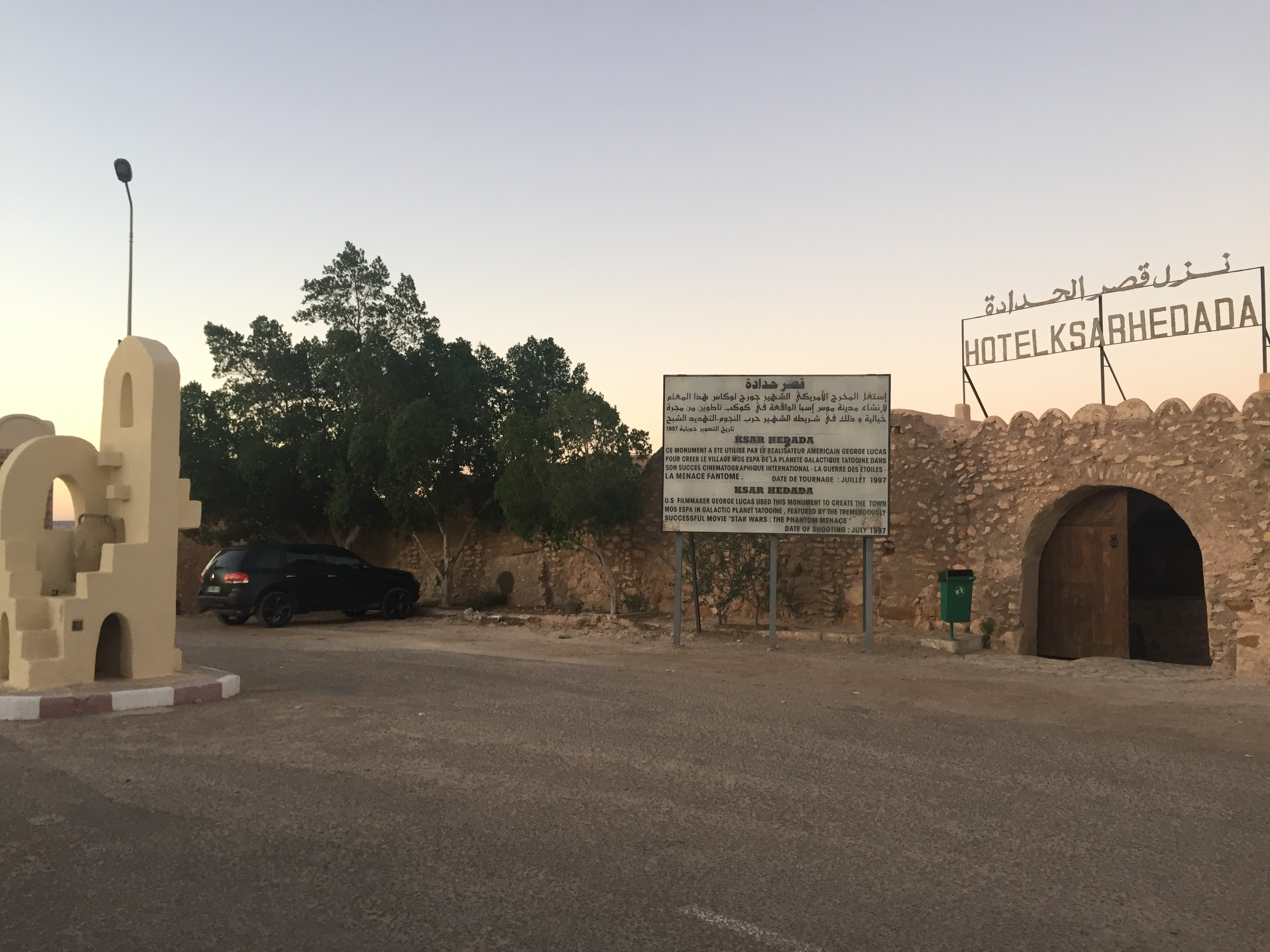
Center of Ksar Hadada village in 2016.

Ksar Hadada (Arabic: قصر حدادة), sometimes known as Ksar Hedada, is a village in southeastern Tunisia. It is well known as being a filming location for 1999 film Star Wars: Episode I – The Phantom Menace. The population at the 2004 census was 1298, and 1142 in 2014.

== Geography ==
Ksar Hadada is surrounded by a mountain range. The village is also home to a valley between 25 and 50 meters deep called Gattar.

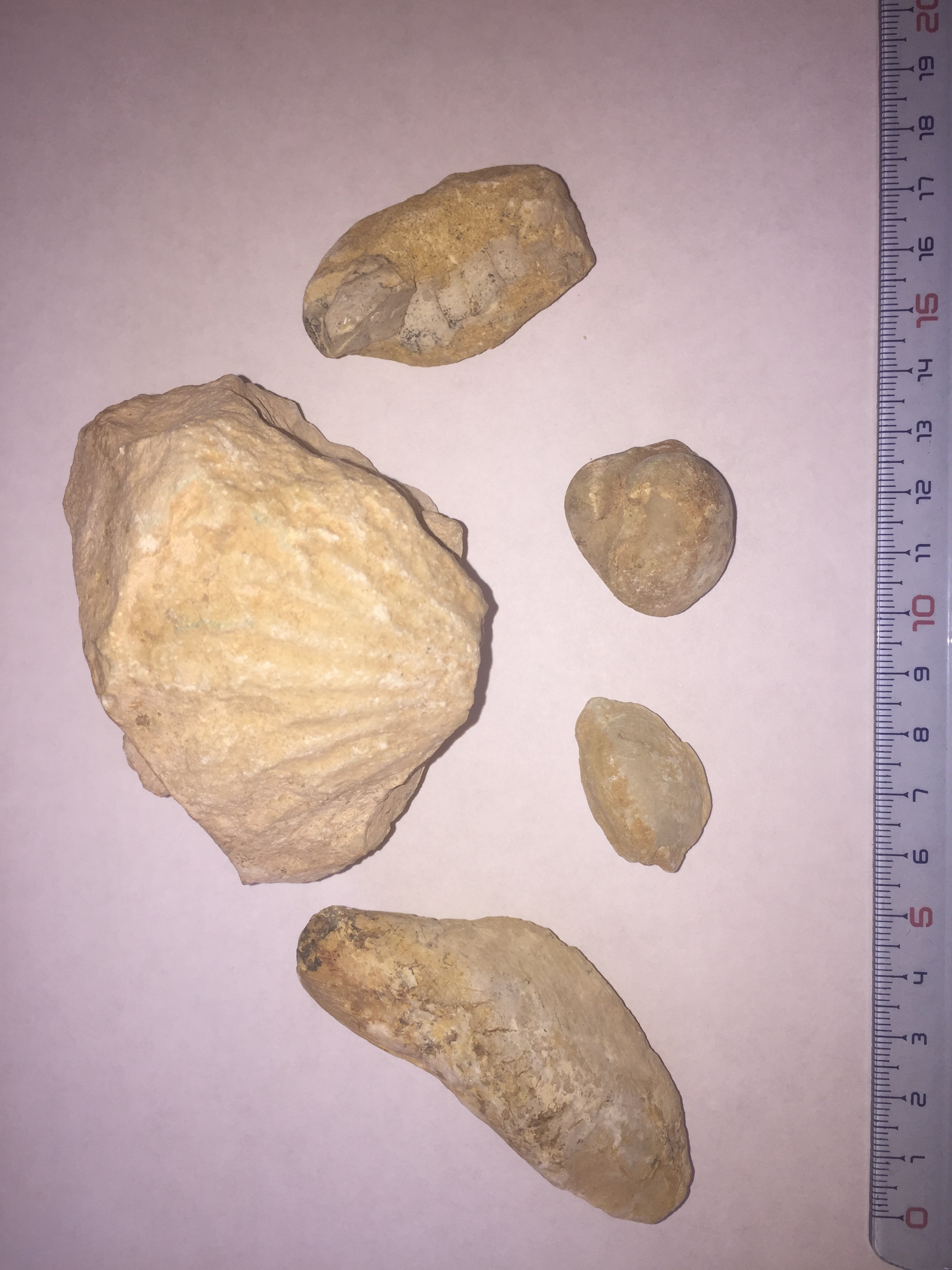
Fossils found in Ksar Hadada

Several fossils have been found in and around the village.

=== Climate ===
The climate is semi-arid, as the Sahara is only fifty kilometers away, and rain is rare but abundant when it does occur. Temperatures can reach 48 °C during the day in summer and go down to 0 °C at night in winter.

== Architecture and education ==
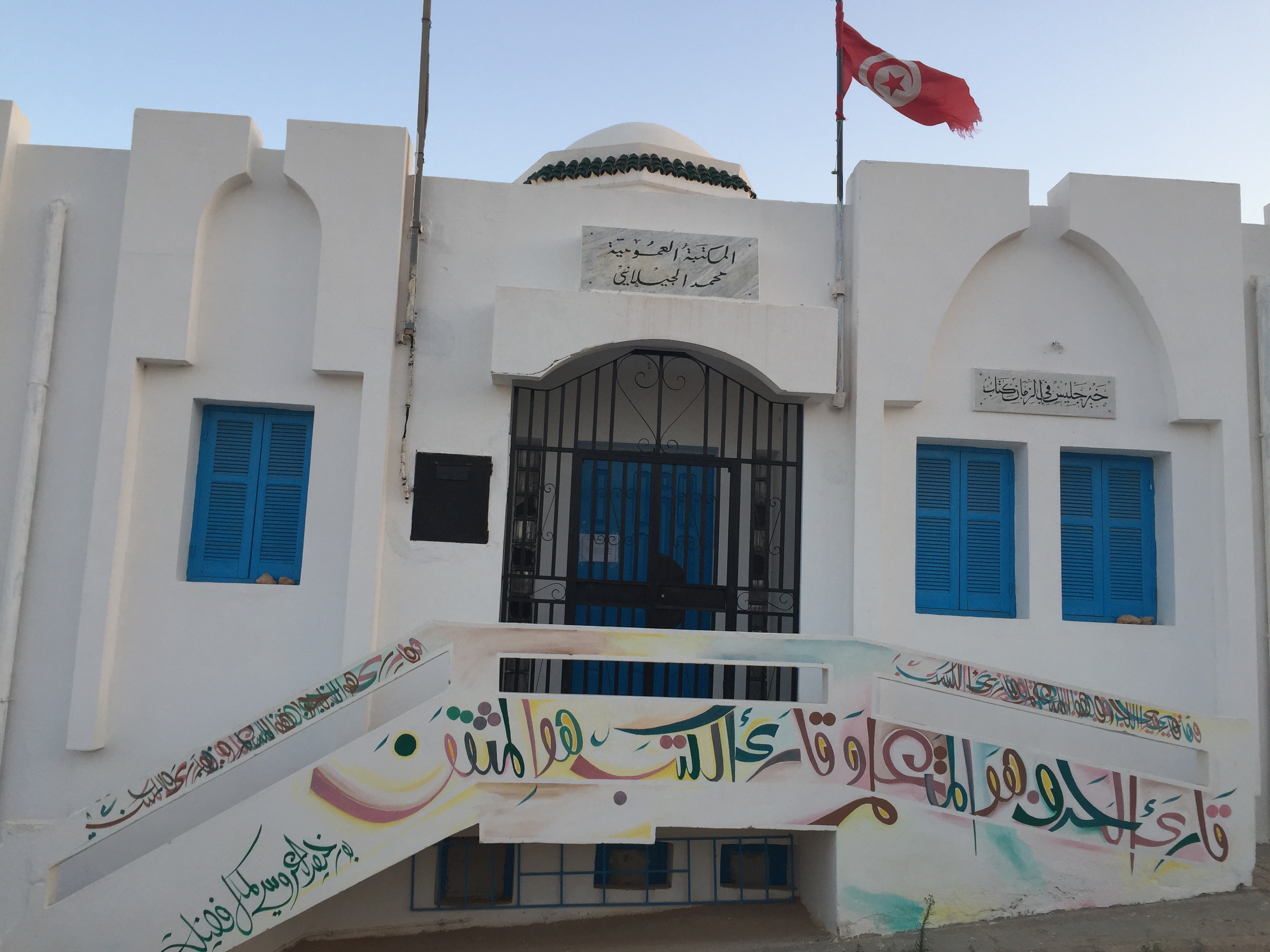
Ksar Hadada public library

A mosque was built in the 1950s. There are also two cafés, a post office, a library, a football stadium and a dozen shops.

The village has a kindergarten and a primary school. On the other hand, the ksar does not have a middle or high school, but there are relationships established to link the village with the two middle schools and two high schools of the town of Ghomrassen.

== Politics ==
=== Government ===
Ksar Hadada is run by a mayor and a village council. Seeing as almost all local government is located in Ghomrassen, projects concerning the village are discussed with the mayor of Ghomrassen and the town's council, and occasionally with the governor of Tataouine.

Mayor	From	To	Political party
Mohamed Yahiaoui	circa 1991	2011	Democratic Constitutional Rally
2011-2014: no mayor, only the village council
Tarek Yahiaoui	2014	2016	Independent
Abdelmonem Yahiaoui	2016	incumbent	Independent

=== Elections ===
Election	Year	First place		Second place		Participation	Ref.
Presidential	2014	Moncef Marzouki	91.11%	Beji Caid Essebsi	8.22%	61.53%	
Legislative	2014	Ennahda	63.09%	Chaâb Yourid (independent list)	10.41%	64.17%	
Legislative	2011	Ennahda	61.8%	Progressive Democratic Party	8.4%	86.6%	

== Economy ==
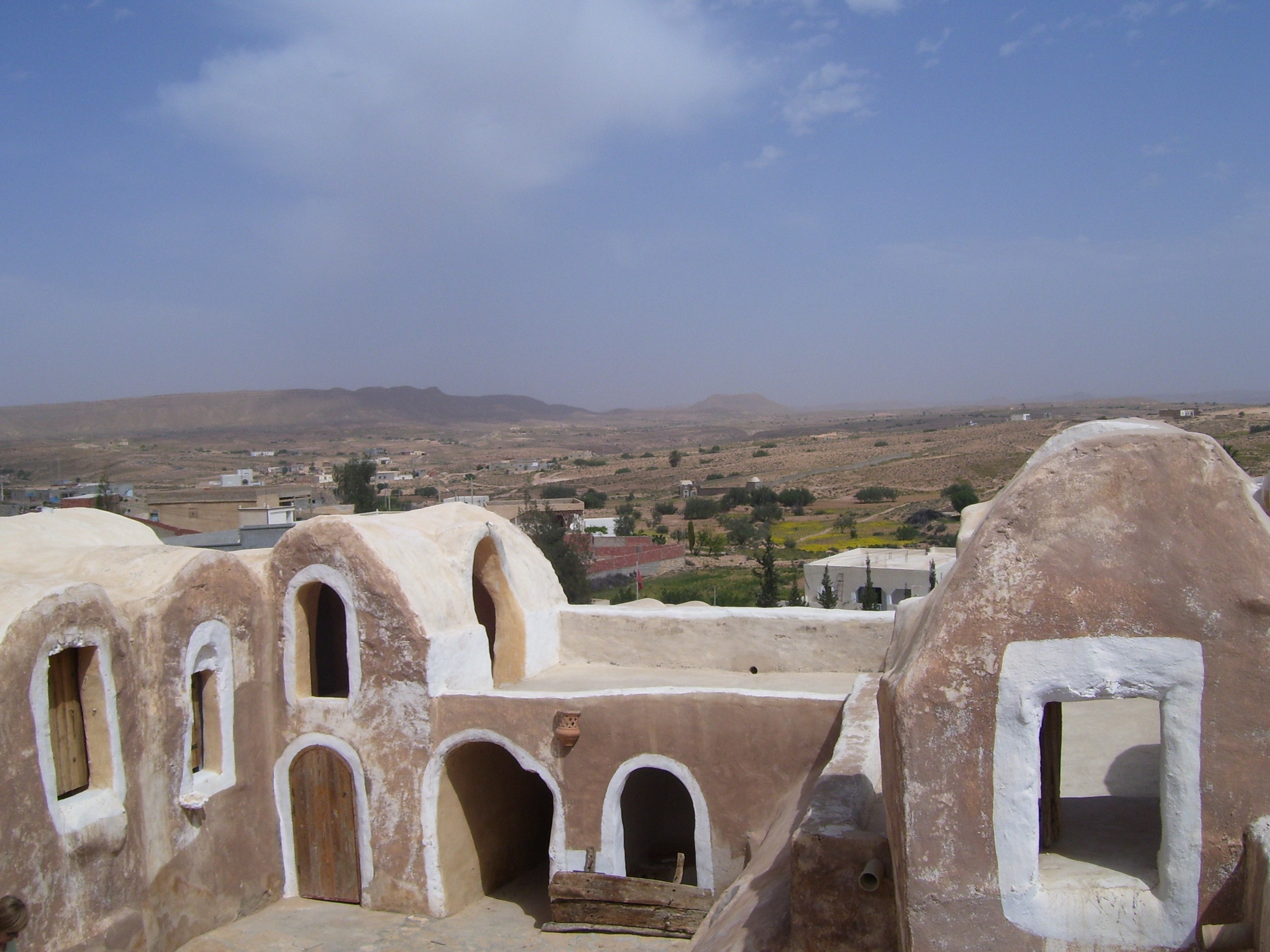
A view of Ksar Hadada

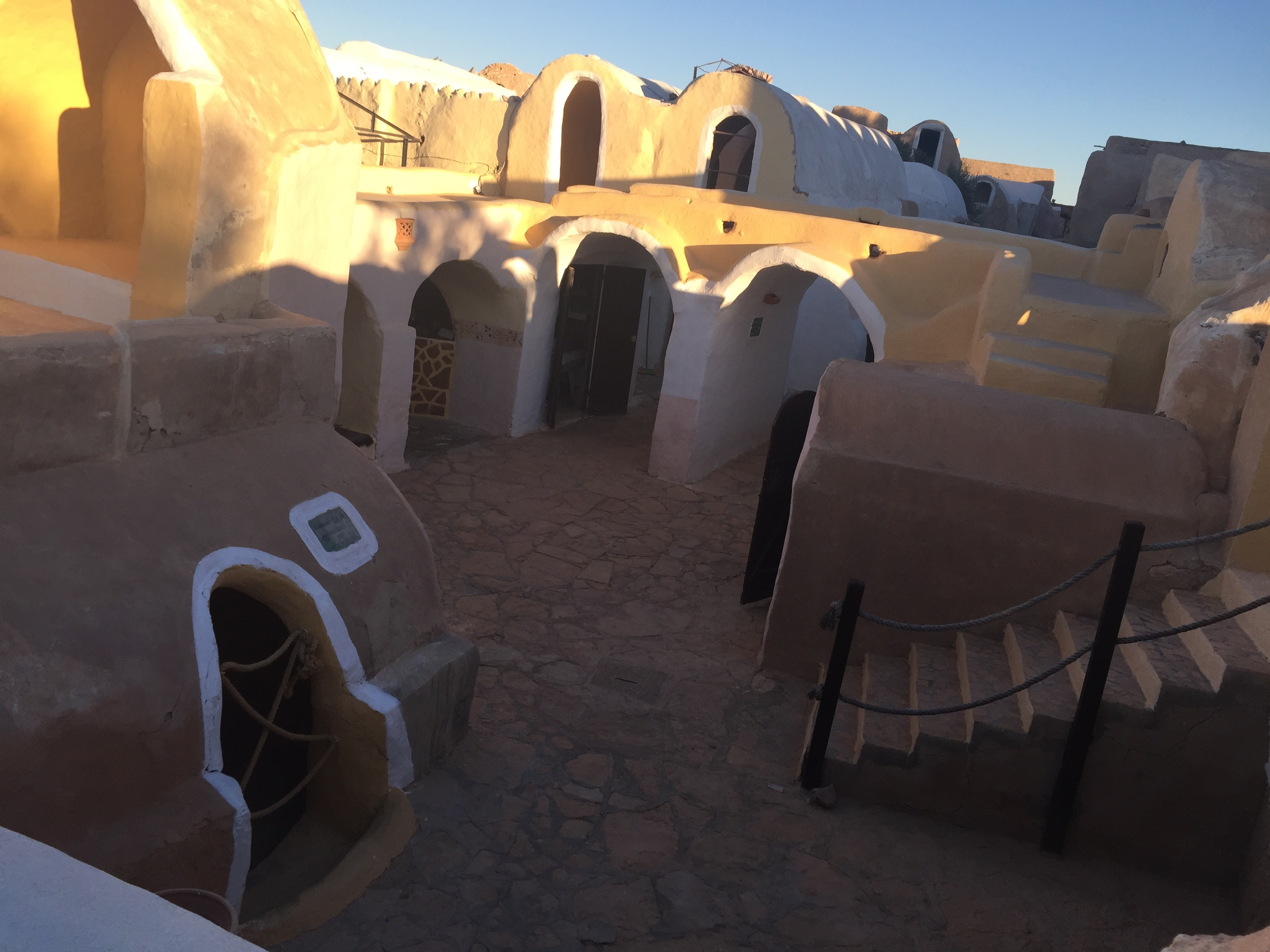
A view of Ksar Hadada

The local economy depends mainly on olive cultivation as well as goat and sheep farming. Most of the village's residents no longer live there and only return during the holidays; this emigration is caused by a lack of employment. Ksar Hadada remains strongly tied to the nearby town of Ghomrassen, as it is the seat of the municipality.

Part of the ksar has been turned into a hotel where tourists can stay. In June 1997, American film director George Lucas used the area to shoot on-location scenes for Star Wars: Episode I – The Phantom Menace (1999) to represent Mos Espa on the planet Tatooine, the birthplace of Anakin Skywalker.

== Famous people ==
- Amira Yahyaoui (1984- ), activist and founder of the NGO Al Bawsala (daughter of Mokhtar)
- Mokhtar Yahyaoui (1952–2015), judge and human rights activist before the revolution
- Zouhair Yahyaoui (1967–2005), cyber-dissident active in favor of freedom of expression under the regime of Zine el-Abidine Ben Ali, dead following torture (cousin of Amira)

== Tribute ==
An onshore oil field in the south of Tunisia is named Ksar Hadada.
