= Mokhtar Yahyaoui =

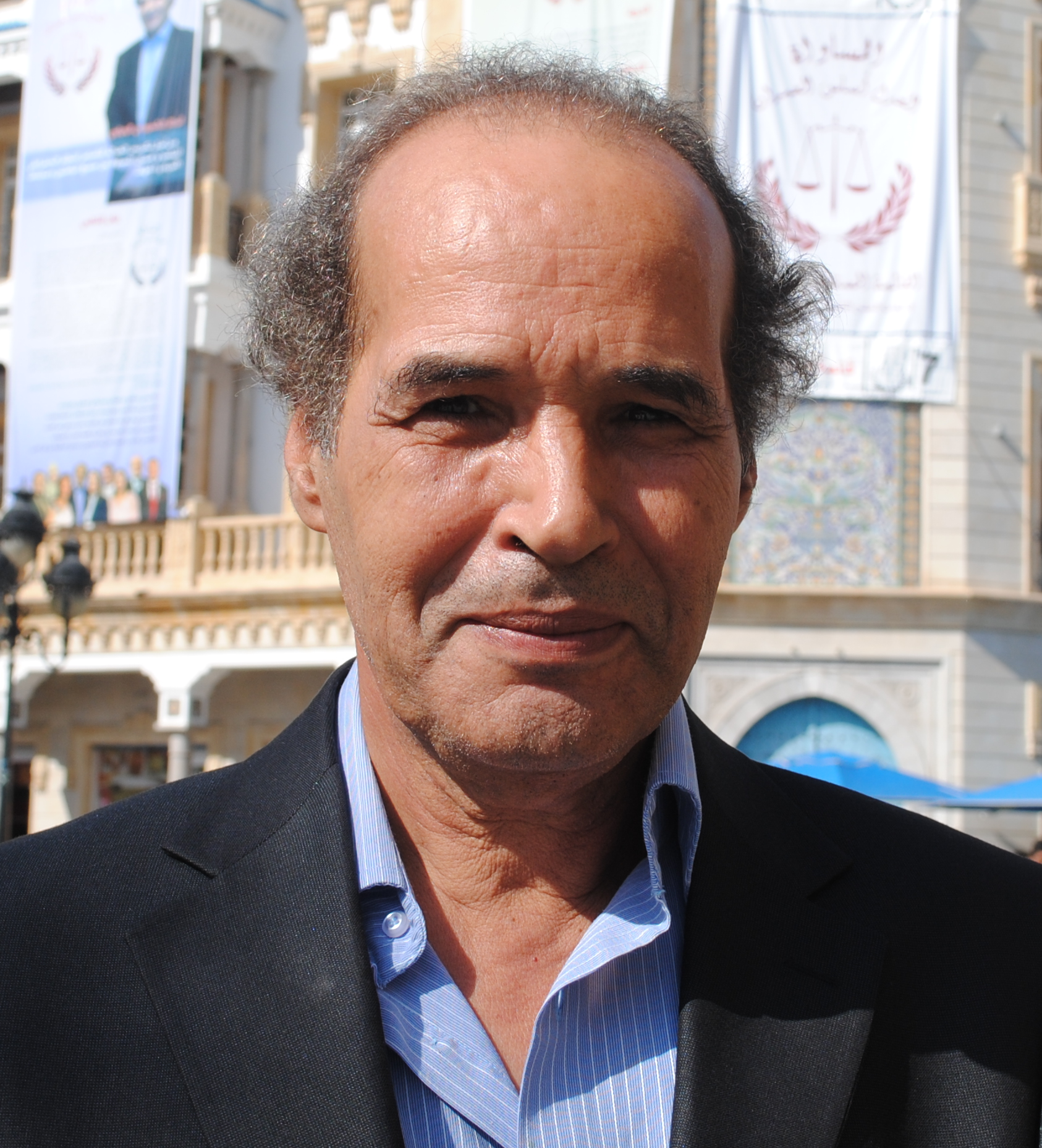
- Mokhtar Yahyaoui
- Born: June 1, 1952; Ksar Hadada, Tataouine Governorate, Tunisia
- Died: September 22, 2015 (aged 63); Bizerte Governorate, Tunisia
- Occupation: Tunisian judge

Mokhtar Yahyaoui (Arabic: مختار اليحياوي) was a human rights activist and a Tunisian judge. He was opposed to the system of former Tunisian President Zine El Abidine Ben Ali. Yahyaoui was born on June 1, 1952, in the village of Ksar Hadada in southern Tunisia, and died on September 22, 2015, in Teskrayah in the village of Ghazaleh from the region of Bizerte.

He was isolated in 2001 from the judiciary and his property was confiscated after sending a message to President Ben Ali criticizing the Tunisian judiciary mode. After the Tunisian revolution, the Administrative Court overturned, on March 23, 2011, the judgement against him in 2001. Following the court decision, he returned to the legal profession.

== Activities ==
Following the Tunisian revolution, Yahyaoui became a national figure a member of the Higher Authority for Realisation of the Objectives of the Revolution, Political Reform and Democratic Transition in 2011. In February 2012 he was appointed Chairman of the National Commission for the Protection of Personal Data.

== Personal life ==
Judge Yahyaoui has a daughter Amira Yahyaoui who is an activist and the founder of the watchdog NGO Al Bawsala. His nephew is the famous blogger Zouhair Yahyaoui, the founder of a satirical website TUNeZINE; he is the first cyber-dissident who died as a result of torture in 2005.

== Death ==
Yahyaoui died according to a preliminary medical report cardiac arrest on September 22, 2015, in Teskrayah in the village of Ghazaleh from the region of Bizerte. He was transferred to the regional hospital Al Habib Boktefh in Bizerte and then to the Charles Nicolle Hospital in Tunis.

He was buried on September 23. Most of Tunisian political faces attended his funeral, including the former President of the Republic of Tunisia Moncef Marzouki, the former head of government Ali Laarayedh, the current Minister of Employment Zied Ladhari and the current Minister of communication technologies and the digital economy Noomane Fehri as well, and the President of the Bar Abderrazak Kilani, as well to the former Minister Samir Dilou, Abdul Wahab Matar, Abdellatif Mekki and Rafik Abdessalem, as well as politicians Rached Ghannouchi, Ahmed Mestiri, Hamma Hammami, Iyed Dahmani, Adnan Mansar, Issam Chebbi, Mohamed Abbou, Abderraouf Ayadi and Mahmoud Baroudi.
Judges in all courts and judicial institutions and the Department of Accounting in Tunisia stopped for a minute of silence before the start of the sessions in memory of the spirit of Judge Mokhtar Yahyaoui, and according to what the Association of Tunisian Judges said that this stance is a touch of fulfillment for the judge Mokhtar Yahyaoui and for the struggle he went through before the Tunisian revolution for independence of the judiciary and to defeat corruption.

== Honors and awards ==
- After his death on October 7, 2015, his family received the second class of the Order of the Republic of Tunisia by the President of the Republic of Tunisia Beji Caid Essebsi.

== See also ==
- 18 October Coalition for Rights and Freedoms
