= Kamel Omrane =

Tunisian scholar of Islam and politician

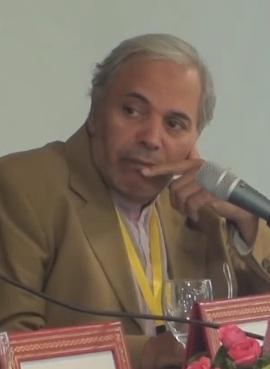
- Kamel Omrane in a public appearance, 16 September 2017
- Born: January 18, 1951; Tunis
- Died: May 14, 2018 (aged 67); Tunis
- Occupations: Islamic scholar, academic and politician
- Years active: 1999-2018

Kamel Omrane (Arabic: كمال عمران; January 18, 1951 – May 14, 2018) was a Tunisian scholar of Islam and politician. He was the Tunisian Minister of Religious Affairs.

== Biography ==
He studied at Bardo High School and then at the École Normale Supérieure of Tunis where he obtained a master's degree in Arabic Language and Literature in 1973. In 1980, he received an M.A. in Arabic literature from the Ecole Normale Supérieure de Tunis in 1973 and the agrégation in Arabic language in 1980. He received a PhD in Muslim Civilization in 1994.

He was a university professor from 1999 to 2018, has published a number of publications on Arab-Muslim thought and has participated in several conferences in Tunisia and abroad.

He held several positions including adviser to the Minister of Higher Education, Director of the Higher Institute of Documentation, Director General of Radio Stations of Tunisia, Special Advisor and Advisor to the Minister of Education, and Director General of the Quranic radio Zitouna. He was also a member of the Higher Islamic Council, the Higher Council of Culture, the Economic and Social Council, and the executive board of UNESCO. He also hosted a program on cultural radio about Islam in his dealings with modernity, reform, east–west relations.

== Honours ==
- Officier of the Order of the Republic of Tunisia
- Officer of the National Order of Merit of Tunisia

== Publications ==
- (ar) The translation and its theories (الترجمة ونظرياتها), ed. Beït El Hikma, Carthage, 1989
- (ar) Reading the religious text (في قراءة النص الديني), ed. Maison tunisienne de l'édition, Tunis, 1990
- (ar) Conclusion and rejection in Islamic culture (الإبرام والنقض: قراءة في الثقافة الإسلامية), ed. Maison tunisienne de l'édition, Tunis, 1992
- (ar) Renewal and experimentation in Islamic culture (التجديد والتجريب في الثقافة الإسلامية), ed. Maison tunisienne de l'édition, Tunis, 1993
- (ar) The human being and his destiny in modern Arab-Islamic thought (الإنسان ومصيره في الفكر العربي الإسلامي الحديث), ed. Publications de la faculté des lettres de la Manouba, La Manouba, 2001
- (ar) Tunisia and its saints in the corpus of Sufis (تونس وأولياؤها الصالحون في مدونة المناقب الصوفية), ed. Publications de la faculté des lettres de la Manouba, La Manouba, 2008
- (ar) Passion of the text: approach of the civilizational texts (شغاف النص: في مقاربة النص ذي الطابع الحضاري), ed. Centre de publication universitaire, Tunis, 2008
- (ar) Cultural approaches (مداخل إلى الثقافة), ed. Ministry of Culture, Tunis, 2008
