= Ksar Hallouf =

Coordinates: 33°17′28″N 10°09′26″E

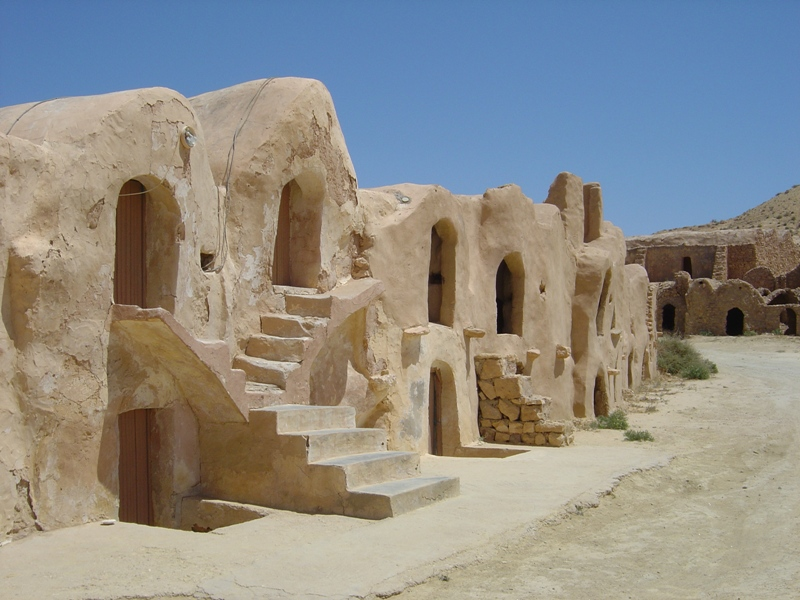
Ghorfas in Ksar Hallouf

Ksar Hallouf, also known as Ksar El Hallouf, is a fortified village (ksar) in the Médenine Governorate, Tunisia.

== Description ==
The ksar (translatable to fortified village) was built in the 13th century. The village was expanded during the mid 19th century, but had fallen into disrepair by the early 20th-century. The site was partially restored in 2006, and the village now serves as a tourist attraction. Some of the village's Ghorfas are partially collapsed.

In 2020 Ksar Hallouf was one of several Tunisian villages nominated to be UNESCO World Heritage sites by the Tunisian government.
