= Wafa Makhlouf =

Tunisian politician

Wafa Makhlouf Arabic: وفاء مخلوف
- Born: 1975 (age 50–51)
- Education: Member of the Tunisian Parliament
- Known for: Entrepreneurship

Wafa Makhlouf ( Arabic: وفاء مخلوف ) is a Tunisian politician, the co-founder and member of the executive committee of Nidaa Tounes since 2012 and the Executive Director of CEED Tunisia. Makhlouf has a diploma in Finance. She founded her own business initiative, an environmental company. Proclean focuses on household refuse collection and mechanized beach cleaning in 2003.

== Life and career ==
Makhlouf is the Executive Director of the organisation CEED. She was a member of the Jeune Chambre Economique in Hammam Chott from 2003 until 2005, a member of the CJD (Centre des Jeunes Dirigeants) – Young CEO Centre in Tunisia in 2005 and its president in 2011. She initiated the first women entrepreneurs incubator and the initiative Wajjahni.

She was the Chairwoman of the Board of Enactus Tunisia.

== Political life and nominations ==
Wafa Makhlouf is one of the founders of the Tunisian Political Party Nidaa Tounes. She was elected in the 2014 parliamentary election and joined the National Assembly. In 2017, she announced her will to run for presidential elections supported by her party.

In 2015, she was nominated by Arabian Business as one of the 100 most powerful Arabs under 40.

In 2016, Wafa was nominated along with Amira Yahyaoui, as a Young Global Leader by the World Economic Forum.
