= Bir Lahmar =

Coordinates: 33.1787°N 10.4421°E

Bir Lahmar (بئر الأحمر)
- Commune and town
- Interactive map of Bir Lahmar
- Country: Tunisia
- Governorate: Tataouine Governorate

Population (2014)
  - Total: 7,955
- Time zone: UTC+1 (CET)

Bir Lahmar is a town and commune in the Tataouine Governorate, Tunisia. As of 2004 it had a population of 8,418. It is surrounded by the mountains of Djebel Dahar to the west and the coastal plain of Djeffara to the east.

As the name implies ("red well" in Arabic), the city developed around a source of water, a precious element in a desert region traditionally traveled by caravans.

== Population ==
2014 Census (Municipal)
Homes	Families	Males	Females	Total
3127	1942	3617	4338	7955

== See also ==
- List of cities in Tunisia
