= Censorship in Tunisia =

Censorship in Tunisia has been an issue since the country gained independence in 1956. Though considered relatively mild under President Habib Bourguiba (1957–1987), censorship and other forms of repression became common under his successor, President Zine El Abidine Ben Ali (November 1987 – January 2011). Ben Ali was listed as one of the "10 Worst Enemies of the Press" by the Committee to Protect Journalists starting in 1998. Reporters Without Borders named Ben Ali as a leading "Predator of Press Freedom". However, the Tunisia Monitoring Group reports that the situation with respect to censorship has improved dramatically since the overthrow of Ben Ali in early 2011.

== Ben Ali era: Legal provisions ==
Article 8 of the Tunisian Constitution states "the liberties of opinion, expression, the press, publication, assembly, and association are guaranteed and exercised within the conditions defined by the law." Article 1 of the Press Code provides for "freedom of the press, publishing, printing, distributing and sale of books and publications."

The main reference for the information in this section is the "IFLA/FAIFE Report on IFEX-TMG Mission to Tunis".

=== Books ===
The Press Code requires a receipt from the Ministry of the Interior before distributing books in the country. Islam and human rights are two frequent points of contention. Frequently banned authors include Mohamed Talbi, Hamma Hammami, Sihem Bensedrine, Moncef Marzouki, and Taoufik Ben Brik. The League of Free Writers believes that 40 books were censored in the decade 1995–2005.

Tunisia has 380 public libraries, which include a regional branch for each of the 23 regions and a National Library in Tunis. It is estimated that 200–300 new titles for adults are published each year. The National Library has depository rights to four copies of each work published in the country.

=== Newspapers ===
All major newspapers essentially follow the government line and tend to report uncritically on the activities of the President. Certain editions of foreign—principally French—newspapers that criticise the human rights situation or alleged electoral fraud, such as Le Monde, Libération, La Croix, Le Figaro are often banned or censored, when they publish articles unfriendly to the Tunisian regime. Charlie Hebdo and Le Canard enchaîné, both satirical newspapers, are banned on a permanent basis. In order to avoid accusations of censorship, Ben Ali's regime authorized only a very limited number of editions of foreign newspapers.

Some banned editions are available "behind the counter" at libraries and must be requested. Twelve editions of Le Monde have been censored since 2006 according to RSF. Libération was censored in February 2007 following the publication of an article by Taoufik Ben Brik; it was the first time since 1992 that Tunis had censored it.

=== Television ===
The state exercises a monopoly on domestic television transmissions, although satellite dishes are popular and offer access to foreign broadcasts.

=== Radio ===
There is a small number of private radio stations, but they do not independently report news. A permit is required to establish a radio station. Electoral endorsements of candidates are not permitted in the private media.

=== Internet ===
Internet censorship in Tunisia significantly decreased in January 2011, following the ouster of President Zine El Abidine Ben Ali, as the new acting government:

- proclaimed complete freedom of information and expression as a fundamental principle,
- abolished the information ministry, and
- removed filters on social networking sites such as Facebook and YouTube.

Some Internet censorship reemerged when in May 2011:

- the Permanent Military Tribunal of Tunis ordered four Facebook pages blocked for attempting "to damage the reputation of the military institution and, its leaders, by the publishing of video clips and, the circulation of comments and, articles that aim to destabilize the trust of citizens in the national army, and spread disorder and chaos in the country", and
- a court ordered the Tunisian Internet Agency (ATI) to block porn sites on the grounds that they posed a threat to minors and Muslim values.

In 2012 the OpenNet Initiative found no evidence of Internet filtering in the political, social, conflict/security, and Internet tools areas. Tunisia is listed as "Under Surveillance" by Reporters Without Borders in 2011.

Prior to January 2011 the Ben Ali regime had blocked thousands of websites (such as pornography, mail, search engine cached pages, online documents conversion and translation services) and peer-to-peer and FTP transfer using a transparent proxy and port blocking. Cyber dissidents including pro-democracy lawyer Mohammed Abbou were jailed by the Tunisian government for their online activities.

== Post-Ben Ali ==
Following the resignation of President Ben Ali in the 2011 Tunisian Revolution, press reports indicated that books banned under the previous regime, including La régente de Carthage and L'assassinat de Salah Ben Youssef, had appeared in bookstores and were openly circulating.

In 2012, Tunisian activists and human rights groups expressed concerns following several high-profile cases that the nation's Islamist leadership was cracking down on freedom of expression. Tabloid publisher Nassredine Ben Saida was jailed for eight days in February after publishing a photograph from GQ of footballer Sami Khedira's naked girlfriend, while the head of a private television station was charged with blasphemy for showing the animated film Persepolis. In March, Ghazi Beji and Jabeur Mejri were sentenced to seven and a half years' imprisonment for uploading a text to Facebook criticizing Mohammad and including a naked caricature of him. The Associated Press described the severity of the sentence as having "shocked many Tunisians" and as "a sign of the new importance of Islam in Tunisia". Mentally ill 25-year-old Ramzi Abcha was sentenced to four years' imprisonment in April after he desecrated Korans in several mosques. Amnesty International designated Abcha, Beji, and Mejri as prisoners of conscience.

== Specific cases ==
=== Hamadi Jebali ===
Hamadi Jebali is a journalist and former editor of Al-Fajr, the publication of the banned Islamist party An-Nahda. He was sentenced to one year in prison in January 1991 after his newspaper called for reform of the military justice system. In August 1992 he was given a much harsher 16-year sentence by a military court for insurrection and membership in an illegal organisation. He was tried with 279 other suspected An-Nahda members or sympathisers. The trials were heavily criticised by foreign human rights monitoring groups. Hamadi Jebali remained in prison until 2006,^{1} and Jebali was considered a prisoner of conscience by Amnesty International. In 2011, he became the nation's prime minister.

=== Taoufik Ben Brik ===
Taoufik Ben Brik, who followed in 2000 a 42 days hunger strike in protest against Ben Ali's regime, published in February 2007 articles criticizing Ben Ali in the French press. Tunis responded by censoring the 23 February 2007 edition of Le Monde, which published an article from Ben Brik titled "Qui écrit encore à Tunis?" (Who Still Writes in Tunis?) and two editions of Le Nouvel Observateur (8 and 21 February 2007). The 8 February 2007 article criticized the display of wealth in Tunisia, which contrasted with the real misery of its inhabitants The 20 February 2007 article used boxing metaphors to talk about his life during the past three years

Libération's website was blocked starting on 21 February 2007, following the publication by Taoufik Ben Brik of an article titled "En 2009 je « vote » pour Ben Ali" (In 2009, I "vote" for Ben Ali). www.leblogmedias.com is also censored since Ben Brik wrote for it, as well as the review Médias.

=== Sihem Bensedrine ===
Sihem Bensedrine is a journalist active in the political opposition. For her work in advancing human rights and press freedom, she was shortlisted for the Sakharov Prize in 2002 and was awarded an International Press Freedom Award from Canadian Journalists for Free Expression in 2004. She filed a request with the government to publish the magazine Kalima in 1999 and did not receive a response.^{2} In June 2001 Bensedrine was arrested and imprisoned for six weeks for making comments critical of the judiciary on a private London television station; she was released in August.^{3} In January 2004 she was assaulted by alleged plainclothes police and had her third attempt to register Kalima rejected.^{4}

The Index on Censorship reported in mid-2005 that Bensedrine had become "the target of a viciously obscene campaign of hate" in the pro-government media, which it attributes to pressure from the government. An editorial in the newspaper As-Shouruq charged her with "selling her conscience ... to foreigners ... and to Zionists in particular." She was described in other publications as "hysterical," "delirious," and a "political prostitute." In the past, a photograph of Bensedrine's face had been superimposed onto pornographic images. These and similar notions, widely regarded abroad as spurious and insulting, have led censorship experts such as Rohan Jayasekera to hail Bensedrine as "a friend to media freedom."^{5}

Sihem Bensedrine currently publishes Kalima on the Internet, as it remains banned in print after four attempts to register. The government has had mixed success in blocking the electronic version. Bensedrine collaborates with Naziha Réjiba, alias Om Zeid, who was harassed by customs police in September 2003 for bringing a small amount of foreign currency from abroad.^{6}

=== Tunisian Workers' Communist Party ===
The Tunisian Workers' Communist Party (Parti communiste des ouvriers tunisiens, PCOT) is a proscribed communist political party led by Hamma Hammami. PCOT is described by its co-thinkers in France as "constituting the most important opposition force" in Tunisia. Hammami was arrested and sentenced to over four years in prison for contempt of court, and reports that he was "savagely tortured." He was given additional sentences of eleven years and five years for, among other things, membership in an illegal organisation and distribution of propaganda.^{7} At least ten of his books are banned. Hammami's wife, Radhia Nasraoui, a human rights lawyer and also an outspoken opponent of President Ben Ali, went on a 57-day hunger strike in late 2003 to protest official surveillance of her home and communications.^{8}

=== Abdallah Zouari ===
Abdallah Zouari is a journalist (formerly of Al-Fajr) who was sentenced to eleven years in prison in 1991 for membership in an illegal organisation. He was released in June 2002 but continued to serve five years of "administrative control" in a remote desert town in southern Tunisia.^{9} He was re-arrested in August the same year and charged with possession of illegal weapons. He was again released in September 2004.

=== Zouhair Yahyaoui ===
Zouhair Yahyaoui, alias Ettounsi, founded and edited one of the first open discussion forums on the internet the satirical website TUNeZINE (http://www.tunezine.com). This 'Zine' (a play on words connecting the genre to the President) drew participants from across the political spectrum discussing women's issues, human rights, economic problems, freedom of expression as well as religion. The site itself was often censored, access to it could be difficult if at all possible, and though he used a pseudo, Yahyaoui himself was tracked down and arrested for creating the site. Imprisoned for a few years in the Borj al Amri prison, there were numerous campaigns for his release (he was sentenced to a couple of years). Shortly after being released he died of a heart attack on March 13, 2005. He was severely tortured and developed several health problems in prison.^{10}

== WAN controversy ==
In July 1996 the World Association of Newspapers (WAN) suspended the Tunisian Newspaper Association for not speaking out about attacks on the press. The TNA was expelled in June 1997 following an investigation into press freedom.^{11}

== WSIS controversy ==
Tunis hosted the 2005 World Summit on the Information Society, a global conference on the development of information technology. Many observers felt that the choice of country was inappropriate given the Ben Ali government's repression of independent voices.

== See also ==
- Tunisia Monitoring Group
- Human rights in Tunisia
