= Amira Yahyaoui =

Tunisian entrepreneur and activist (born 1984)

Amira Yahyaoui أميرة اليحياوي
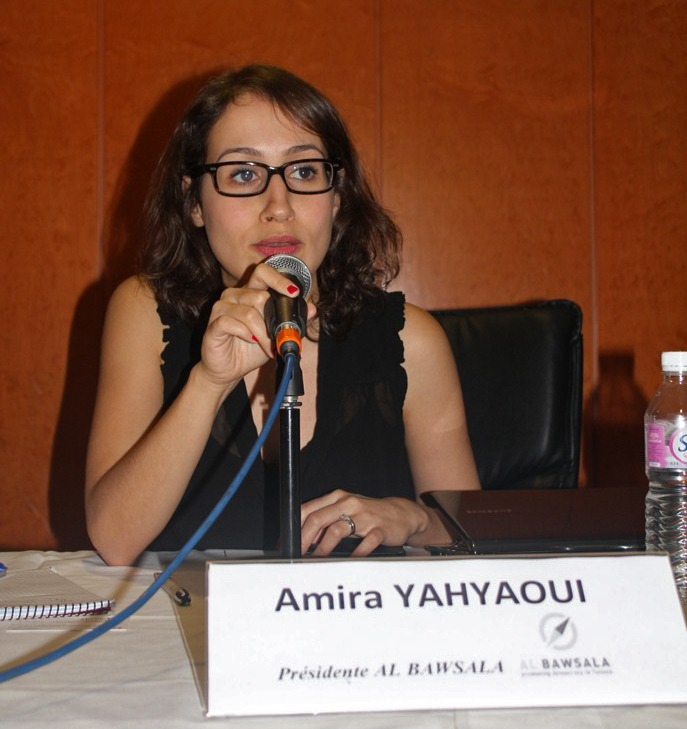
- Born: August 6, 1984 (age 42); Tunis, (native Ksar Hadada)

Amira Yahyaoui (Arabic: أميرة اليحياوي; born August 6, 1984) is a Tunisian entrepreneur, blogger and human rights activist. She was previously the Founder and President of Al Bawsala, a multi-awarded transparency and accountability NGO.

Yahyaoui is a 2016 Young Global Leader at the World Economic Forum, a Middle East and North Africa advisor for Amnesty International and a board member of UNHCR’s Advisory Group on Gender, Forced Displacement, and Protection. She has received many international awards for her activism, including Vital Voices Trailblazer Female Leadership award, the Foundation Chirac Prize for Conflict Prevention, and has been recognized multiple times as one world’s most influential Arab/African women.

== Early life ==
Amira Yahyaoui was born in Tunis, from a family native of Ksar Hadada. She is the daughter of Tunisian judge Mokhtar Yahyaoui.

Yahyaoui comes from a family of human rights activists. Her father Mokhtar Yahyaoui was an opponent to the government of former Tunisian President Ben Ali. He was dismissed after writing about the lack of justice in Tunisia, and put under constant house surveillance for years. Her cousin Zouhair Yahyaoui was an economist who founded the satirical website TUNeZINE. He died in 2005 after being persecuted and tortured by the government for his objections to censorship in Tunisia.

== Human rights activist career ==
=== Dissident under Ben Ali's Regime ===
When she was 16, Yahyaoui started a blog criticizing the regime of Ben Ali and highlighting its human rights abuses. She gained prominence in Tunisia as an anti censorship and pro freedom of expression activist. Due to her attacks on the government, she was repeatedly targeted by government agencies. While still a teenager, she was monitored by the state’s secret police and beaten for her activism.

After being exiled from Tunisia, at age 18, Amira Yahyaoui fled to France and studied there while continuing to protest against Ben Ali's presidency and to raise awareness about his autocratic excesses. During those years, she was stateless and became part of the Tunisian "human rights diaspora".

=== Tunisian revolution ===
While in exile, Amira Yahyaoui cofounded the Nhar 3la 3mmar, a protest against censorship that took place in many cities around the world in May 2010. The event was organized to promote visibility around the human rights issue of freedom of expression, and even though it was not originally presented as a demonstration against the government, it became the most prominent movement for freedom of expression in Tunisia. It was very closely followed by the Tunisian police, and several activists were arrested.

During the Tunisian revolution that started on December 17, 2010, Amira Yahyaoui used her online platform to raise awareness about human rights abuses and executions in her country, debating Ben Ali's representatives on TV and lobbying the international community to stand by the Tunisian protesters.

As Ben Ali fled the country on January 14, 2011, Amira got her passport back exactly the same day and moved back to Tunisia right away.

New elections were called to form a new Tunisian Parliament and write a constitution for the new democratic regime. Several months after coming back to Tunisia, Yahyaoui ran in the 2011 Constituent Assembly election as an independent candidate to raise awareness about the importance of the constitutional debate. Her campaign list used multiple media channels to call out the lack of attention political parties were paying to the writing of the new Tunisian Constitution.

=== Al Bawsala ===
Yahyaoui founded the NGO Al Bawsala (translated to "The Compass" in Arabic) in 2012., to monitor the work of the Constituent Assembly. In the following years, Al Bawsala became one of the most prominent NGOs in the Middle East. Al Bawsala's use of technology for social progress has been recognized by many awards from international organizations such as the World Summit Award.

Al Bawsala promotes government transparency and accountability, monitors the Tunisian legislative process and advocates for individual freedoms. During the constituent assembly process, Al Bawsala used technology to render the debate around the writing of the Tunisian constitution accessible to every citizen in Tunisia. The NGO was at the center of debates around access to information, gender equality, and other key issues for the nascent Tunisian democracy.

=== Co-Chair of 2016 Davos Conference ===
Amira Yahyaoui was named co-chair of the World Economic Forum 2016 Annual Meeting, around the theme of the Fourth Industrial Revolution. She led the forum alongside business leaders including Mary Barra (CEO, General Motors), Satya Nadella (CEO, Microsoft), Hiroaki Nakanishi (chairman and CEO, Hitachi), and Tidjane Thiam (CEO, Credit Suisse).

The Fourth Industrial Revolution became a much debated theme in the business and policy circles after the forum. Multiple books were published on the subject, and on October 10, 2016, the World Economic Forum announced the opening of its new Centre for the Fourth Industrial Revolution in San Francisco.

== Mos ==
Yahyaoui founded Mos, which began in 2017 as a way for U.S. students to obtain financial aid. Mos received $4 million in seed funding from Garrett Camp, John Doerr, and other investors. The company expanded in 2022 to become a neobank, offering additional financial services targeted primarily at Generation Z. The company was named after Mos Espa from the Star Wars universe, for which Yahyaoui's hometown served as a filming location. Since 2018, the company said that 400,000 students had used Mos to obtain an average of $16,430 in financial aid.

In 2023, Mos laid off about half of its approximately 50-person staff and shut down its banking service, refocusing on its financial aid products. The company faced scrutiny of its metrics from a New York Times investigation, and from some of its investors. Sequoia Capital, which had invested in Mos, encouraged Yahyaoui to hire an outside firm to verify that its bank accounts belonged to real people. Three people told The New York Times that Yahyoui asked employees to use pseudonyms and stock photographs in testimonials for Mos's marketing. In response to an inquiry about Mos's user count in 2023, Yahyaoui posted on social media that female founders were often presumed guilty while male founders were presumed innocent.

== Honors and awards ==
Amira Yahyaoui has received a number of internationally recognized awards for her work promoting human rights and democracy in the Middle East and North Africa region.

- In 2012, was awarded the Global Trailblazers Award at the 2012 Vital Voices Global Leadership Awards (she was re-selected in 2015 for a Global Leadership Award).
- In 2013 and 2014, was selected for Arabian Business’s list of the Most Powerful Arab Women in the World.
- In 2014, became a Meredith Greenberg Yale World Fellow.
- In 2014, was awarded the Conflict Prevention Prize by the Fondation Chirac.
- In 2015, was awarded the Global Leadership Award at the 2015 Vital Voices Global Leadership Awards.
- In 2016, was named by the World Economic Forum as a Young Global Leader along with the Tunisian parliamentarian Wafa Makhlouf.
- In 2016, was named by the World Economic Forum as co-chair of the 2016 Davos Conference, themed on the Fourth Industrial Revolution.
- In 2022, Yahayaoui was selected as a Bloomberg New Economy Catalyst.
