= Beni Khedache =

- Commune and town
- Location in Tunisia
- Coordinates: 33.25°N 10.20°E
- Country: Tunisia
- Governorate: Médenine Governorate

Population (2014)
  - Total: 2,968
- Time zone: UTC+1 (CET)

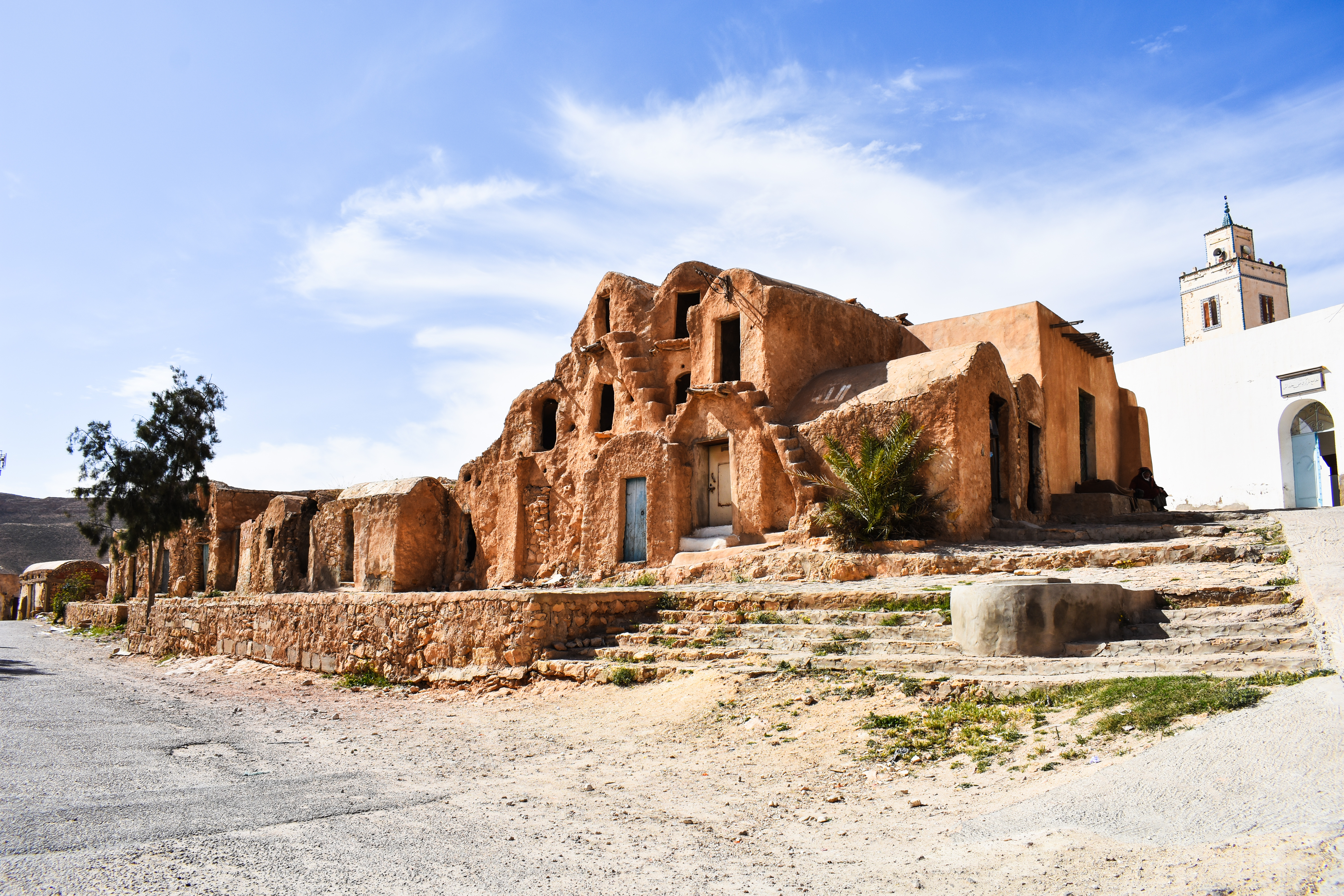
Ksar Beni Khedache, a traditional fortified granary in the town.

Beni Khedache (Arabic: بني خداش Banī Ḫaddāš) is a town and commune in Médenine Governorate, Tunisia. It had a population of 3,071 as of 2004. It lies between Jebel Dahar and the Grand Erg Oriental, roughly 30 kilometres (19 mi) west of Médenine. It is home to a subterranean mosque.

== Notable people ==
- Boubaker El Akhzouri (1948-), theologian and politician

== See also ==
- List of cities in Tunisia
