= Metameur =

- Commune and town
- Metameur
- Interactive map of Metameur
- Coordinates: 33°22′10″N 10°26′20″E
- Country: Tunisia
- Governorate: Medenine Governorate
- Time zone: UTC+1

Metameur is a village with around 1500 inhabitants in the south of Tunisia located near Medenine. Metameur lies in a slightly elevated area about 100 m above sea level. d. M. about 7 km (route) northwest of Medenine.

Metameur was founded around the 14th century.

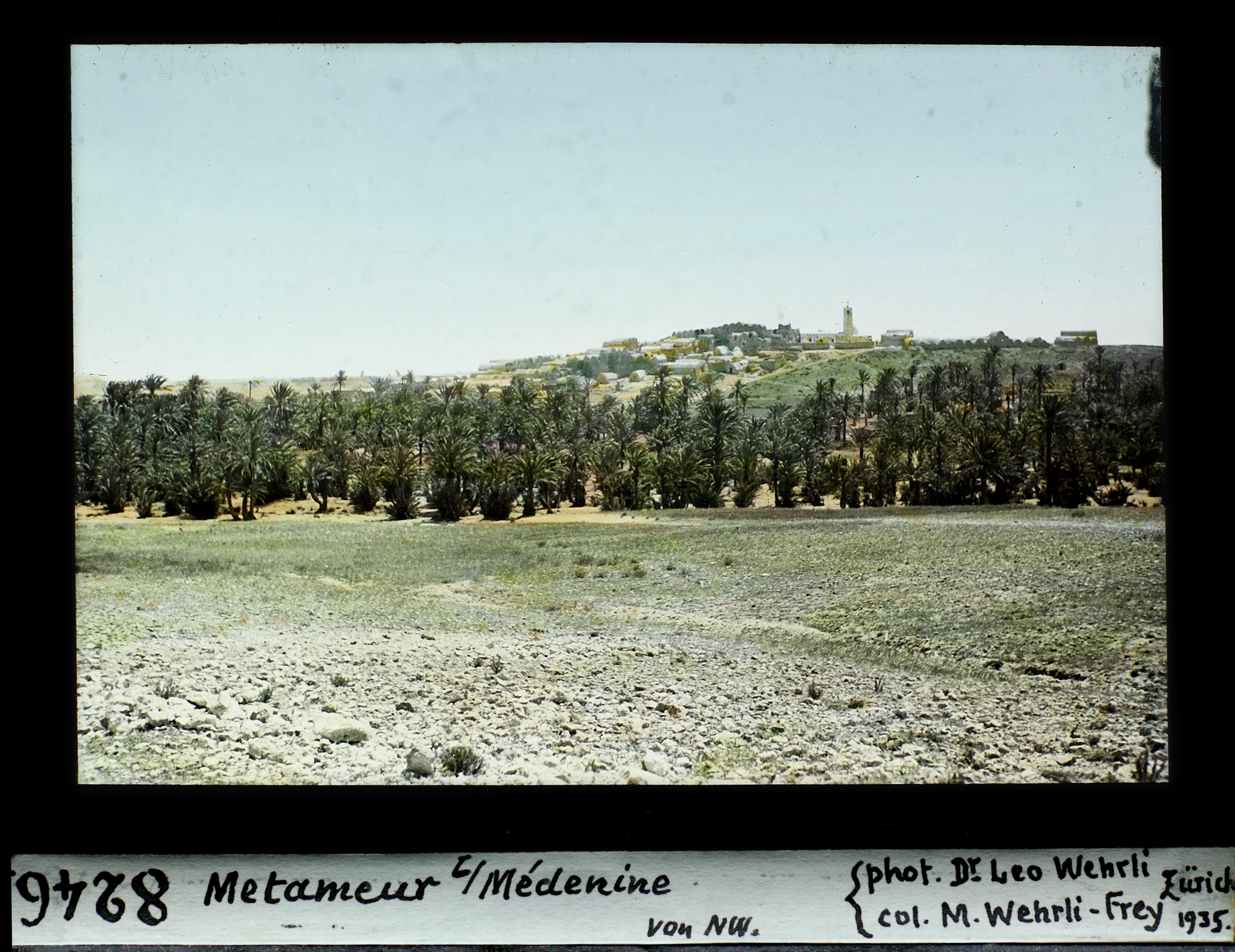
ETH BIB Metameur at Medenine

== See also ==
- List of cities in Tunisia
- Medenine
