= Remada =

Remada رمادة
- Municipality
- Location within Tunisia
- Coordinates: 32°18′22″N 10°22′56″E
- Country: Tunisia
- Governorate: Tataouine
- Delegation: Remada

Area
  - Total: 27,595 km^{2} (10,654 sq mi)

Population (April 23, 2014)
  - Total: 10,173
  - Density: 0.369/km^{2} (0.96/sq mi)
- Time zone: UTC+01:00 (CET)
- Postal code: 3240
- Area code: 5315

Remada (Arabic: رمادة) is a municipality in Tunisia, close to the border with Libya. It is located at around 32°18′22″N 10°22′56″E. Remada was built as a garrison town by the French and is today home to a Tunisian military base.

During the First World War, the French occupied the city and built houses for their soldiers.

== Climate ==
Climate data for Remada (1981–2010, extremes 1950–2017)
| Month | Jan | Feb | Mar | Apr | May | Jun | Jul | Aug | Sep | Oct | Nov | Dec | Year |
|---|---|---|---|---|---|---|---|---|---|---|---|---|---|
| Record high °C (°F) | 30.0 (86.0) | 35.3 (95.5) | 38.4 (101.1) | 41.4 (106.5) | 45.0 (113.0) | 47.3 (117.1) | 48.5 (119.3) | 47.3 (117.1) | 44.9 (112.8) | 42.6 (108.7) | 35.5 (95.9) | 30.3 (86.5) | 48.5 (119.3) |
| Mean daily maximum °C (°F) | 16.3 (61.3) | 18.7 (65.7) | 22.2 (72.0) | 26.6 (79.9) | 31.2 (88.2) | 35.2 (95.4) | 37.4 (99.3) | 37.6 (99.7) | 34.0 (93.2) | 29.2 (84.6) | 22.6 (72.7) | 17.5 (63.5) | 27.4 (81.3) |
| Daily mean °C (°F) | 11.3 (52.3) | 13.1 (55.6) | 16.2 (61.2) | 19.9 (67.8) | 24.0 (75.2) | 27.6 (81.7) | 29.8 (85.6) | 30.2 (86.4) | 27.3 (81.1) | 23.2 (73.8) | 17.3 (63.1) | 12.6 (54.7) | 21.0 (69.9) |
| Mean daily minimum °C (°F) | 6.9 (44.4) | 7.9 (46.2) | 10.5 (50.9) | 13.5 (56.3) | 17.1 (62.8) | 20.4 (68.7) | 22.4 (72.3) | 23.3 (73.9) | 21.4 (70.5) | 17.8 (64.0) | 12.4 (54.3) | 8.2 (46.8) | 15.2 (59.3) |
| Record low °C (°F) | −1.4 (29.5) | −4.9 (23.2) | −0.4 (31.3) | 3.5 (38.3) | 8.1 (46.6) | 12.0 (53.6) | 14.2 (57.6) | 14.7 (58.5) | 12.6 (54.7) | 6.9 (44.4) | 3.0 (37.4) | −5.9 (21.4) | −5.9 (21.4) |
| Average precipitation mm (inches) | 10.9 (0.43) | 8.3 (0.33) | 12.5 (0.49) | 5.3 (0.21) | 4.7 (0.19) | 1.1 (0.04) | 0.1 (0.00) | 0.7 (0.03) | 6.1 (0.24) | 11.0 (0.43) | 9.0 (0.35) | 13.0 (0.51) | 82.7 (3.25) |
| Average precipitation days (≥ 1.0 mm) | 2.0 | 1.8 | 2.5 | 1.1 | 0.9 | 0.5 | 0.0 | 0.3 | 1.2 | 1.3 | 1.7 | 1.9 | 15.2 |
| Average relative humidity (%) | 62 | 55 | 55 | 53 | 52 | 50 | 49 | 52 | 58 | 58 | 59 | 63 | 56 |
| Mean monthly sunshine hours | 208.0 | 225.8 | 249.9 | 267.1 | 294.7 | 315.6 | 355.8 | 331.7 | 262.1 | 248.8 | 219.1 | 207.7 | 3,186.3 |
Source: Institut National de la Météorologie (precipitation days/humidity 1961–1990) (Note: The Station ID for Remada is 57272511.)
