= Tataouine Governorate =

Governorate of Tunisia

Tataouine ولاية تطاوين
- Governorate
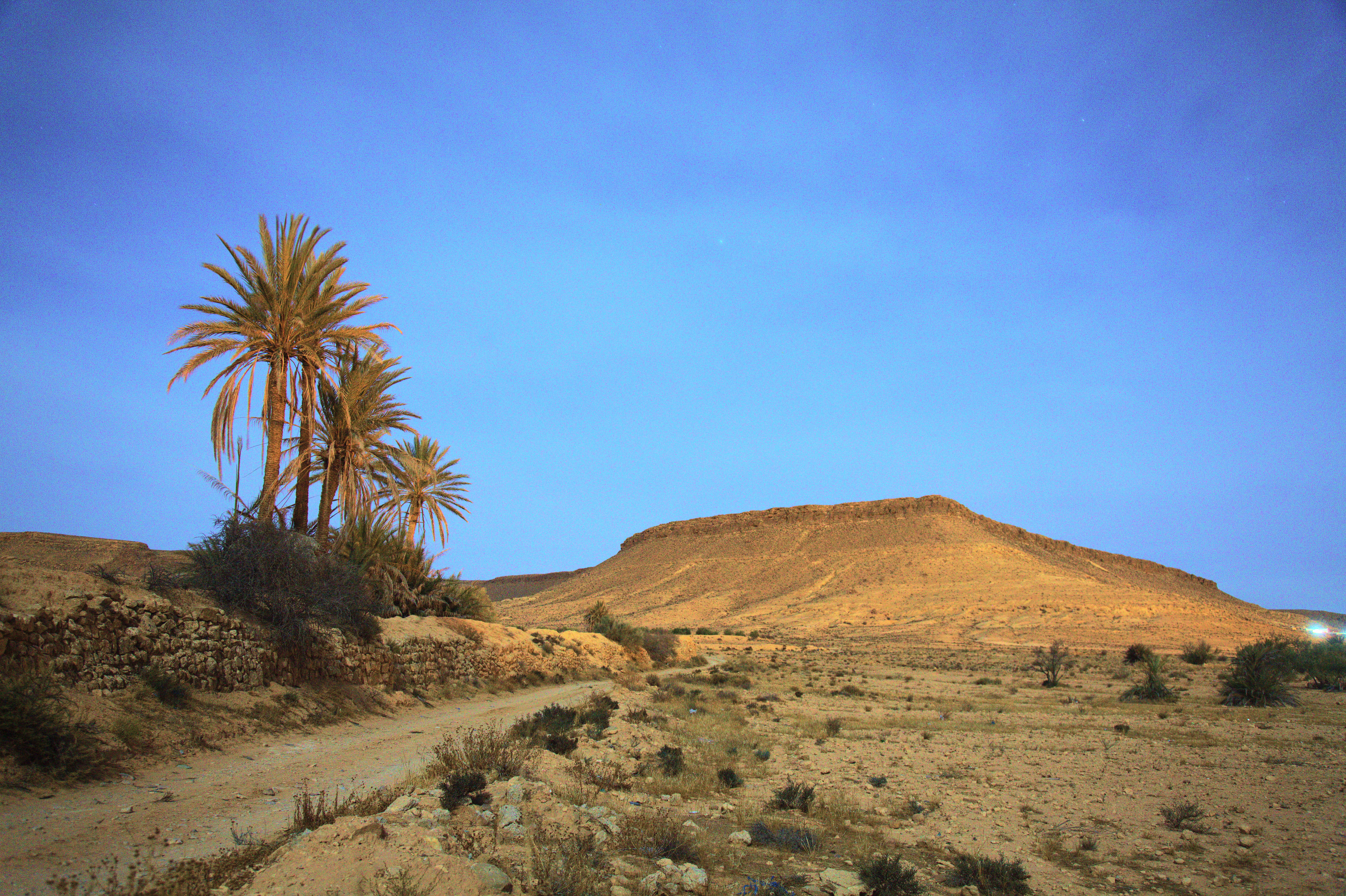
- Moonlit landscape of Tataouine

- Map of Tunisia with Tataouine highlighted

- Subdivisions of Tataouine Governorate
- Coordinates: 32°55′32″N 10°26′39″E
- Country: Tunisia
- Created: 2 March 1981
- Capital: Tataouine

Government
  - Governor: Amir Gabsi (since 2024)

Area
  - Total: 38,889 km^{2} (15,015 sq mi)
  - Rank: Ranked 1st of 24

Population (2014)
  - Total: 149,453
  - Rank: Ranked 23rd of 24
  - Density: 3.8431/km^{2} (9.9535/sq mi)
- Time zone: UTC+01 (CET)
- Postal prefix: xx
- ISO 3166 code: TN-83

Tataouine (Tunisian Arabic: ولاية تطاوين Wilāyat Taṭāwīn; French: Gouvernorat de Tataouine) is the southernmost of the twenty-four governorates of Tunisia, the only one to border both Algeria and Libya. It is also the largest, covering an area of 38,889 km^{2}. It had a population of 149,453 (at the 2014 census), nearly tied for second least-populated with Kebili (156,961) after Tozeur (107,912). The capital is Tataouine. The region's economy is based on agriculture. With a large agricultural area (200,000 hectares), the region is dominated by olive trees, legumes, early vegetables, and asparagus, which is exported, as well as the production of red meat and milk.

== Geography ==
Wells from aquifers dot the eastern slopes of the pronounced long escarpment climbing gradually from 100 m to 500 m in elevation two provinces north in the south extreme of Gabes Governorate, passing through a thin strip of Medenine and then at the heart of the province ending around a capital city Tripoli, Libya. The ridge attracts variable winter and early spring relief precipitation and little other rain and shares with the rest of the area a hot desert climate (Köppen climate classification BWh) with long, extremely hot summers throughout (see North-south graduation of Tunisian climatic zones), the patchy and infrequent rainfall in winter is greater than the average for the Sahara Desert of which the area forms part. Approximately half of the escarpment exceeds 500 m in the province, the peak within Tunisia being 631 m near the town of Remada on the main road south of Tatouine leading into mid-eastern Libya. The tripoint of the three countries is close to the Libyan town of Ghadames which has surrounding it three airstrips, one of which constitutes an airport and one of which lies in Algeria. Close to the west or south-west border is El Borma Airport and the province has a second, which is for defence and rescue, Remada Air Base.

== Administrative divisions ==
The Tataouine Governorate is divided into seven delegations (mutamadiyat) and further divided into 64 sectors (imada). The delegations with their populations at the 2004 and 2014 censuses are listed below:

Delegation	Area in km^{2}	Population 2004 Census	Population 2014 Census
Bir Lahmar	245	9,270	8,460
Dhehiba	3,222	3,971	4,295
Ghomrassen	689	18,335	15,957
Remada	27,595	9,977	10,173
Smâr	1,994	13,826	14,793
Tataouine Nord	2,839	54,362	61,431
Tataouine Sud	1,898	33,783	34,344

Five municipalities are in Tataouine Governorate:

5311	Tataouine	95,892
5312	Bir Lahmar	10,772
5313	Ghomrassen	16,351
5314	Dehiba	5,920
5315	Remada	9,964
	Smâr	8,080

== Economy ==
The region's economy is primarily based on agriculture. Spanning a large agricultural area of 200,000 hectares, the region is dominated by olive trees, legumes, early vegetables, and asparagus, which are cultivated both for export and for the production of red meat and milk.

The industrial sector is also growing. The governorate hosts fifteen industrial companies, primarily engaged in construction materials and agri-food industries. Additionally, there are three foreign or mixed-capital industrial companies.

In the southern desert area of the governorate, numerous oil fields are present. The oldest, El Borma, has been in operation since 1966. Recent discoveries in the Oued Zar region have spurred significant oil exploration activity in the area. The development of new fields partly offsets the depletion of reserves in older deposits; for instance, the El-Borma field, which produced four million barrels per year in 1970, now produces only 600,000 barrels annually.

In recent years, the region has seen notable growth in Saharan tourism.

== Tourist sites ==
Fortified settlements (ksars), manifestations of Berber architecture, such as Ksar Ouled Soltane, Chenini, Douiret, and Ksar Hadada, are popular tourist sites.

This is where George Lucas filmed part of Star Wars, and a near-homophone of the Tataouine city was chosen to be the home planet of the protagonist's family (Tatooine).
