= Zouhair Yahyaoui =

- زهير اليحياوي
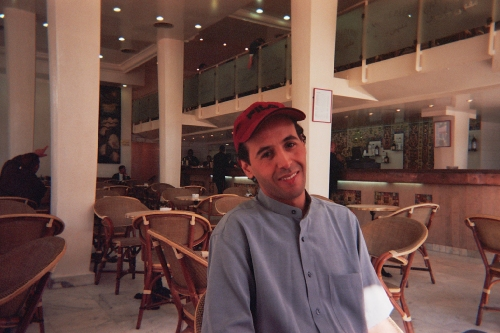
- Zouhair Yahyaoui in 2004
- Born: December 8, 1967
- Died: March 13, 2005 (aged 37)
- Other name: Ettounsi

Zouhair Yahyaoui (Arabic: زهير اليحياوي, romanized: Zuhayr al-Yaḥyāwī; December 8, 1967 – March 13, 2005) was the first cyber-dissident to be pursued and condemned in Tunisia, a country that is often rated at the top of lists of Internet policing by independent third-party sources such as the OpenNet Initiative. He was the nephew of the judge Mokhtar Yahyaoui, who was also a vocal critic of the Tunisian regime and its lack of respect for judiciary processes. His cousin Amira Yahyaoui founded the NGO Al Bawsala.

== Career ==
Yahyahoui, alias Ettounsi, founded and edited one of the first open discussion forums on the Internet, the satirical website TUNeZINE (which has since been shut down). This 'Zine' (a play on words connecting the genre to the President) drew participants from across the political spectrum discussing women's issues, human rights, economic problems, freedom of expression as well as religion. The site itself was often victim of the prevalent censorship in Tunisia; access to it could be difficult if at all possible, and though he used a pseudonym, Yahyaoui himself was tracked down and arrested for creating the site. Imprisoned for eighteen months in the Borj al Amri prison, there were numerous campaigns for his release. During his imprisonment, he executed three hunger strikes which helped to draw the attention of the international community. Some human rights activist groups like Reporters Without Borders helped to draw attention to his case.

== Death ==
After leaving prison, Zouhair Yahyaoui was no longer the same man. Weakened by hunger strikes, torture and bad treatment, he died of a heart attack on March 13, 2005. After the Tunisian revolution that ousted Zine el Abidine Ben Ali on January 14, 2011, the newly elected constituent assembly elected Ben Ali's long-time opponent, Mohamed Moncef Marzouki, as a new president. Being a human rights activist, the new president decided that March 13 would become the national day of Internet freedom to commemorate the death of Zouhair Yahyaoui.

== Accolades ==
Yahyaoui was awarded numerous journalistic prizes (in absentia) for his efforts to create a democratic discussion forum; for example, in 2003 Reporters Without Borders gave him the Globenet-Cyber Freedom Prize.

== Awards and honors ==
- 2003 PEN/Barbara Goldsmith Freedom to Write Award
