= Ghomrassen =

City in Tunisia

Ghomrassen غمراسن ⵖⵓⵎⵔⴰⵙⵏ
- Nickname: Ghomrassen
- Location within Tunisia
- Coordinates: 33°03′33″N 10°20′24″E
- Country: Tunisia
- Governorate: Tataouine Governorate

Population (2014)
  - Total: 9,568
- Time zone: UTC+1 (CET)
  - Summer (DST): UTC+1 (CEST)
- Postal code: 3220

Ghomrassen is a city in southeast Tunisia located 26 km (16 mi) from Tataouine and 40 km (25 mi) from Medenine.

Administratively attached to Tataouine, it is a municipality with 9,568 inhabitants as of the 2014 Census. It is also the county seat of delegation of the same name which had 18,335 inhabitants at the 2004 Census and 15,957 at the 2014 Census (National Institute of Statistics) and brings together, in addition to the city of Ghomrassen, the villages of Ksar Hadada, Oued El Khil, Elferch, Elhorria, and Ksar Elmorabitin Guermassa.

== Geography ==
The city, located about 480 km (300 mi) south of the capital Tunis and surrounded by mountains, is built on the site of an ancient oasis. The majority of irrigation wells and the oasis disappeared with the urban development of the city.

The average temperature is 22 °C (72 °F). Annual rainfall varies between 88 and 157 mm (3.5 and 6.2 in).

Administratively, the city is divided into several sectors or Imad, whose authority is embodied by the omda, which can cover both urban and rural areas.

The city is divided into several districts: chare3 el joumhouriya, where the Market, a mosque sometimes considered the most luxurious historic city, Essned, the neighborhood where the primary school of March 2, and a mosque.

Ghomrassen is an Arabic speaking city, with many Amazigh words in the dialect. The accent is the southern Tunisian accent.

== Etymology ==
Its name comes from the Berber roots ghomr for "tribe" and sen for "chief" or "stallions". Ghomrassen therefore means in the Berber language "leader of the group" or "stallion".

== Population ==
2014 Census (Municipal)
Homes	Families	Males	Females	Total
4945	2540	4040	5528	9568
