= List of World Heritage Sites in Tunisia =

Location of World Heritage Sites in Tunisia

The United Nations Educational, Scientific and Cultural Organization (UNESCO) World Heritage Sites are places of importance to cultural or natural heritage as described in the UNESCO World Heritage Convention, established in 1972. Cultural heritage consists of monuments (such as architectural works, monumental sculptures, or inscriptions), groups of buildings, and sites (including archaeological sites). Natural features (consisting of physical and biological formations), geological and physiographical formations (including habitats of threatened species of animals and plants), and natural sites which are important from the point of view of science, conservation or natural beauty, are defined as natural heritage. Tunisia accepted the convention on 10 March 1975, making its sites eligible for inclusion on the list.

Tunisia has ten sites on the list, nine of which are listed for their cultural significance and one, the Ichkeul National Park, for natural significance. This site was listed endangered between 1996 and 2006 because of the construction of dams that threatened the hydrological regime of the lake and resulted in a reduction of vegetation and a drop in bird numbers. By 2006 the situation had improved so the site was removed from the endangered list. The first three sites were listed in 1979 and the most recent, the Village of Sidi Bou Saïd, in 2026. In addition, Tunisia has 15 sites on the tentative list. The country has served on the World Heritage Committee four times.

== World Heritage Sites ==
UNESCO lists sites under ten criteria; each entry must meet at least one of the criteria. Criteria i through vi are cultural, and vii through x are natural.

World Heritage Sites
Site	Image	Location (governorate)	Year listed	UNESCO data	Description
Medina of Tunis	A minaret in North African style	Tunis	1979	36bis; ii, iii, v (cultural)	Tunis was founded in 698 as one of the first Arab cities in the Maghreb. It reached its peak between the 12th and 16th centuries, under the Almohads and Hafsids, when it was one of the wealthiest cities of the Islamic world. Due to its location, it was a linking point between the Maghreb, Europe, and the East. Numerous monuments in the medina have been preserved, including several city gates, the Kasbah Mosque (pictured), noble houses, souks, and a cemetery. A minor boundary modification of the site took place in 2010.
Archaeological Site of Carthage	Ancient ruins near the coast	Tunis	1979	37; ii, iii, vi (cultural)	Founded in the 9th century BCE by the Phoenicians, Carthage developed into a trading empire spanning the Mediterranean. It was a major rival to the Roman Republic which resulted in a series of wars, until the city was ultimately destroyed in 146 BCE. It was later reestablished as Roman Carthage. Remains of buildings from different periods have been preserved, including temples, a theater, public baths, necropolises, cisterns, and residential buildings.
Amphitheatre of El Jem	Ruins of a Roman theater	Mahdia	1979	38bis; iv, vi (cultural)	The 3rd century amphitheatre of Thysdrus, today known as El Jem, is North Africa's largest amphitheatre. It was modeled after the Colosseum in Rome. It is estimated it had a capacity of 35,000 spectators. The fact that such an imposing building was constructed in a rather remote province is a sign of Roman imperial propaganda. A minor boundary modification of the site took place in 2010.
Ichkeul National Park	A view at a lake with vegetation at the side	Bizerte	1980	8; x (natural)	The freshwater lake and the surrounding wetlands are the remains of a much larger chain of lakes. It is an important wintering habitat for hundreds of thousands of migratory birds, especially geese, coots, and ducks, such as the white-headed duck, ferruginous duck, and the marbled duck. Other birds include storks and flamingos. The site was listed as endangered between 1996 and 2006 because of the construction of dams that threatened the hydrological regime of the lake and resulted in a reduction of vegetation and a drop in bird numbers. By 2006, the situation had improved so the site was removed from the endangered list.
Punic Town of Kerkuane and its Necropolis	Ancient ruins with some bottom parts of columns standing	Nabeul	1985	332bis; iii (cultural)	The Phoenicio–Punic town of Kerkouane was abandoned around 250 BCE during the First Punic War. Unlike other Phoenician cities, such as Carthage, Byblos, or Tyre, it was not rebuilt under the Romans. The ruins, which date to the 4th and 3rd centuries BCE were discovered in 1952, and provide an important insight into Punic urban planning. The nearby necropolis that provides insight into the Punic funerary practices was added to the site in 1986.
Medina of Sousse	A view at a mosque near the shore from above	Sousse	1988	498bis; iii, iv, v (cultural)	The coastal town of Sousse became important in the 9th century under the Aghlabids, as a part of the defense system to protect against piracy and other attacks from the sea. The medina has been well preserved. Monuments including the Ribat, which is both a fortification and a religious building, the Great Mosque (pictured), the kasbah, the Bou Ftata Mosque, and fortifications. A minor boundary modification of the site took place in 2010.
Kairouan	A large mosque in evening light	Kairouan	1988	499bis; i, ii, iii, v, vi (cultural)	Kairouan was founded in 670 as one of the first Arabo-Muslim cities in the Maghreb. It served as the capital of Ifriqiya for five centuries and flourished under the Aghlabids in the 9th century. There are numerous monuments in the city, including the Great Mosque (pictured) the Mosque of the Three Doors, the medina, walls, and gates. Kairouan is one of the holiest cities of Islam. A minor boundary modification of the site took place in 2010.
Dougga / Thugga	Ruins of a Roman theatre	Béja	1997	794; ii, iii (cultural)	Dougga encompasses the ruins of a small Roman town, with most buildings dating to the 2nd and 3rd centuries CE. The Roman town was founded on a site of an important Libyan–Punic settlement, which was probably the first capital of the Numidian Kingdom. The town declined in the Byzantine and Islamic periods. Monuments include the Roman theatre (pictured) and the Libyco-Punic Mausoleum. Numerous inscriptions in several regional languages were found on site and provide an insight into the daily life on the fringes of the Roman Empire.
Djerba: Testimony to a settlement pattern in an island territory	An old well with palm trees and a camel	Medenine	2023	1640; v (cultural)	The island of Djerba has a semi-dry climate and water is scarce. This resulted in a specific settlement pattern that developed around the 9th century, with a series of low-density neighborhoods connected with roads. An old well is pictured.
Village of Sidi Bou Saïd	White building with blue doors and windows and some palm trees	Tunis	2026	1769; iii (cultural)	The village, located on the coast of the Gulf of Tunis, started developing in the 18th century when the wealthy citizens of Tunis started building their holiday residences there. There are numerous palaces, religious sites, public spaces, and fountains, in a mixture of architectural styles that have been changing through time. The village is a hub for artists and is a spiritual centre, with the tomb of a Sufi scholar Sidi Bou Said, after whom the village takes its name.

== Tentative list ==
In addition to sites inscribed on the World Heritage List, member states can maintain a list of tentative sites that they may consider for nomination. Nominations for the World Heritage List are only accepted if the site was previously listed on the tentative list. Tunisia maintains 15 properties on its tentative list.

Tentative sites
Site	Image	Location (governorate)	Year listed	UNESCO criteria	Description
El Feidja National Park	Look at a forest from above, a cliff on the left side of the photo	Jendouba	2008	vii, viii, x (natural)	The park is home to oak forests, with species Quercus faginea and Quercus suber. The forests have rich undergrowth with several medicinal and aromatic plants, the knowledge of which is being passed down through generations. The Barbary stag lives here, while the Barbary lion has been extinct since the 20th century.
Bou-Hedma National Park	Savanna scenery with sparse trees and mountains in the background	Sidi Bouzid	2008	vii, viii, x (natural)	The park covers remnants of an ancient pre-Saharan savanna, similar to that of the Sahel. It used to be inhabited by several large mammals such as elephants and antelopes, but they have gradually disappeared. In the 1980s, the scimitar oryx, addax, and ostrich were reintroduced to the area. There are also Roman archaeological remains in the park.
Chott el Djerid	A view of a salt lake in a desert	Kebili	2008	vii, viii, ix, x (natural)	Chott el Djerid is a chott, a salt lake that stays dry most of the year but occasionally fills with water. During humid periods in the past, it used to be a permanent lake up to 25 m (82 ft) deep. Traces of aquatic life have been preserved. Several species of waterbirds visit the lake, including large flocks of flamingos.
Gabès Oasis	A mosque and a palm tree	Gabès	2008	iv, vii, x (mixed)	The Gabès Oasis, located at the Mediterranean coast, is a rare type of a coastal oasis. It is a refuge for several species of small mammals and reptiles, and it serves as a stopover for migratory birds. Date palms, fruit trees, and garden vegetables are grown here. Agriculture is assisted by a network of irrigation channels that have been used for millennia.
Royal Mausolea of Numidia, Mauretania, and Pre-Islamic Funerary Monuments	An ancient mausoleum	several sites	2012	ii, iii, iv (cultural)	This nomination comprises a series of mausolea and funerary monuments across Tunisia. They vary in architectural styles and reflect the interactions between the cultures of the Maghreb. The monuments include the Libyco-Punic Mausoleum of Dougga (pictured, already listed a part of the World Heritage Site of Dougga), the necropolis of Chemtou, the megalithic dolmens of Eles, the monuments at Maktar, and the mausoleum of Henchir Bourgou in Djerba.
Roman Hydraulic Complex of Zaghouan-Carthage		several sites	2012	i, iv (cultural)	The Roman hydraulic complex, built in the early 2nd century, comprises the catchment area with four main springs at Zaghouan, the aqueduct (section pictured) that carries water for 132 km (82 mi) to Carthage and has sections with arches up to 20 m (66 ft) tall, and the infrastructure at the end stage, including the Cisterns of La Malga and the Baths of Antoninus.
Ancient Quarries of Numidian Marbles in Chemtou	Rock formation that was used as a quarry	Jendouba	2012	ii, iv (cultural)	The quarries of Chemtou produced marble for over six centuries, first in the 2nd century BCE and later under Rome, when the so-called Numidian marble became a prized commodity for decoration of patrician residences and public monuments across the Empire. Marble was quarried by slaves and convicts under the supervision of the army. The remains of a military camp have been preserved.
Frontier of the Roman Empire: South Tunisian Limes	Roman ruins in a desert setting	several sites	2012	ii, iii, iv (cultural)	This nomination comprises a series of fortifications, walls, camps, and other support structures that formed the southern Borders of the Roman Empire. Construction started under Emperor Augustus in the early 1st century. Unlike several sections of Roman Limes in Europe that are already listed as World Heritage Sites, this section was constructed in a desert setting, which called for different engineering solutions. Ksar Ghilane is pictured.
Medina of Sfax	A look at the medina from above, with a prominent minaret of a mosque	Sfax	2012	ii, iv, v (cultural)	Founded in the mid-9th century, Sfax was the port of Ifriqiya and its gateway to the Levant. The medina quarter is laid on a rectangular plan and is one of the best examples of Arabo-Muslim urbanism in the Mediterranean basin. The city plan is similar to the one of Kufa, the first Arabo-Muslim city. The medina is dominated by the Great Mosque.
Permian Marine of Jebel Tebaga	Hills in a dry setting	Médenine	2016	vii, viii (natural)	The geological formation of Jebel Tebaga dates to the late Permian period, before the Permian–Triassic extinction event. Fossils found in the formation illustrate the marine life of the period, including trilobites from the genus Pseudophillipsia.
Stratotype of the Cretaceous–Tertiary (K-T) Boundary		Kef	2016	vii, viii (natural)	The geological formation along the Oued Mallègue river exhibits a clear sequence of sediments spanning across the Cretaceous–Paleogene boundary, with a thin iridium-rich layer of clay marking the Cretaceous–Paleogene extinction event, supporting the theory that the extinction was caused by an asteroid impact.
Jugurtha Tableland near Kalaat es Senam	A large mesa in a dry setting	Kef	2017	ii, iii, v, vi, vii, viii (mixed)	Jugurtha Tableland is a large mesa near the town of Kalaat es Senam. It is named after Numidian king Jugurtha who took shelter here during a battle with the Rome between 107 and 105 BCE, before he was ultimately defeated. There is a fort (qal'a) on the top that was used in different historical periods, as well as prehistoric remains such as dolmens. Geologically, the formation is an example of an inverted relief and shows typical processes of erosion.
Troglodyte Habitat and the World of the Ksour of Southern Tunisia	Abandoned fortress in a desert	several sites	2020	iv, v (cultural)	This nomination illustrates traditional forms of human settlement and land use that are representative of the ways of life of indigenous communities in southern Tunisia and their interaction with an unfavourable, even hostile natural environment. It comprises two large troglodyte complexes and a series of ksour, traditional fortified villages in the region. Ksar Chenini is pictured.
Rammadiya d'El Magtaa (El Mekta), the reference site of the Capsian culture	Drawing of an ostrich egg used as a bottle	Gafsa	2021	iii (cultural)	Rammadiya d'El Magtaa near Gafsa is an archaeological site of the Capsian culture, dating from 10,000 to 7,000 years before present, when the area was an open savanna. People of the Capsian culture were hunter-gatherers that left stone figures, petroglyphs, and carved ostrich eggs (drawing of an example pictured).
Archaeological site of Sbeitla	A Roman triumphal arch	Kasserine	2021	ii (cultural)	The Roman town of Sufetula Musuniorum was founded in the 1st century CE as an administrative centre of a region inhabited by nomadic tribes. It was a typical colonial Roman settlement with temples, Roman baths, and a triumphal arch (pictured). It was later used by the Byzantines and Gregory the Patrician, who in 647 declared independence before being defeated in the same year by the Arabs. This marked the end of the Byzantine domination in North Africa.

== See also ==
- List of Intangible Cultural Heritage elements in Tunisia
- Tourism in Tunisia
