= Maktar =

Maktar مكثر
- Town
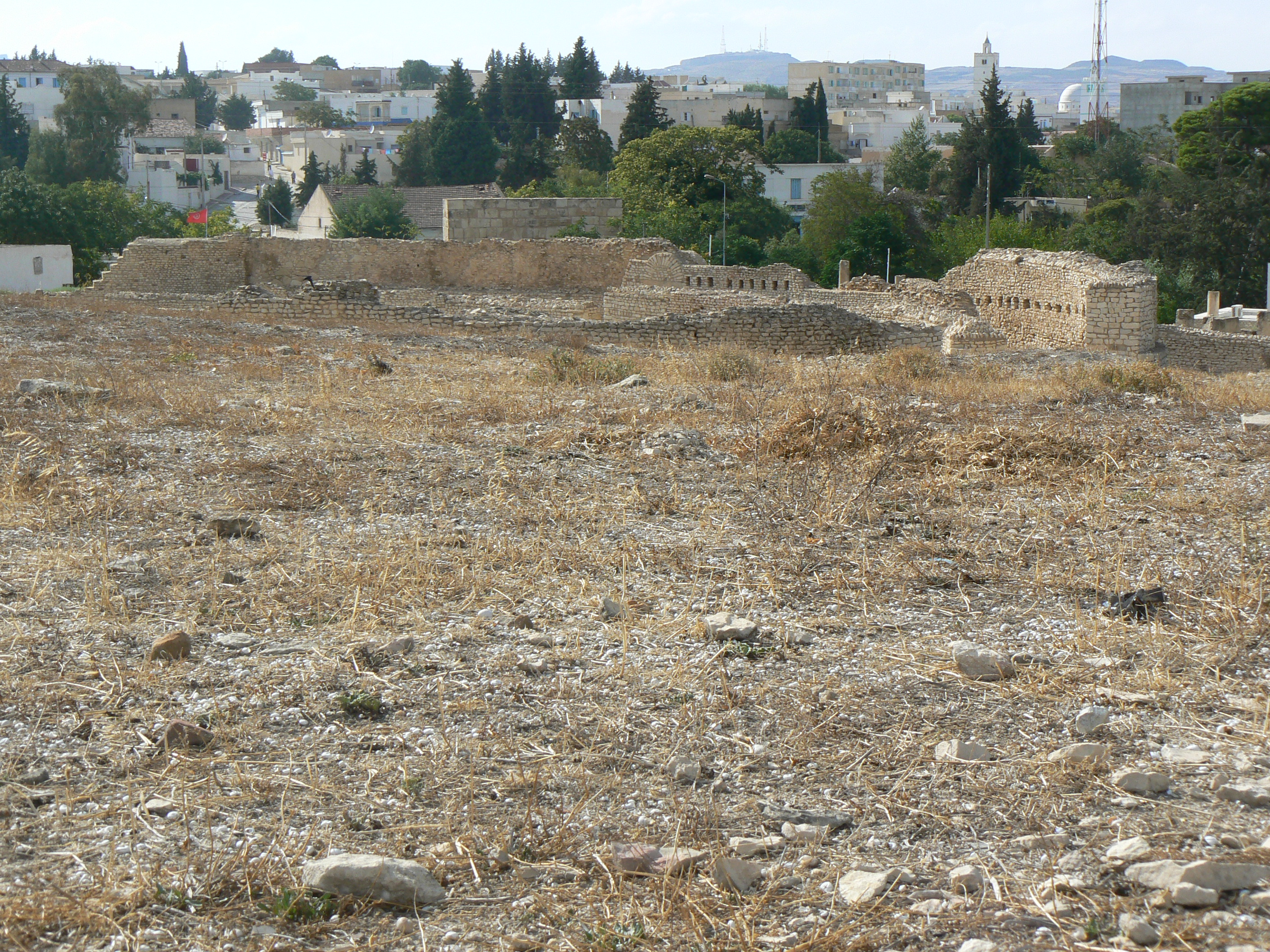

- Location in Tunisia
- Coordinates: 35°51′38″N 9°12′21″E
- Country: Tunisia
- Governorate: Siliana Governorate

Government
  - Mayor: Chedli Louati (Civil Union)
- Elevation: 3,000 ft (900 m)

Population (2014)
  - Total: 13,576
- Time zone: UTC1 (CET)

Maktar or Makthar (Arabic: مكثر), also known by other names during antiquity, is a town and archaeological site in Siliana Governorate, Tunisia.

Maktar was founded by the Berber Numidians as a defense post against Carthaginian expansion. At the end of the Third Punic War, it was settled by many Punic refugees after the Romans' destruction of Carthage in 146 BC. Under Roman rule, it obtained the status of a free city under Julius Caesar in 46 BC and became a Roman colony in AD 146. It formed part of the province of Byzacena and was the seat of a Christian bishop. Under the Romans and Byzantines, it reversed its earlier role to serve as a defense post against local Berber attacks. The town survived the Muslim invasions but was destroyed by the Banu Hilal tribe in the 11th century before being reëstablished. The present town had a population of 13,576 in 2014.

== Name ==
The Carthaginians recorded the town's name variously as mktrm (Punic: 𐤌𐤊𐤕𐤓𐤌), mktrʿm (Punic: 𐤌𐤊𐤕𐤓𐤏𐤌), and mktʿrym (Punic: 𐤌𐤊𐤕𐤏𐤓𐤉𐤌). The Romans Latinized the name as Mactaris, which became Colonia Aelia Aurelia Mactaris upon its elevation to colony status. This name was later arabized as Maktar.

== Geography ==
It is located around 140 km (87 mi) southwest of Tunis and 60 km (37 mi) southeast of El Kef. The modern town lies on a plateau at around 900 m (2,953 ft) above sea level. It sits on the other side of a ravine from the Roman ruins and is known for its scenic views. The town has a continental climate, with cold winters and warm summers and occasional snowfall during the months of January and February.

== History ==
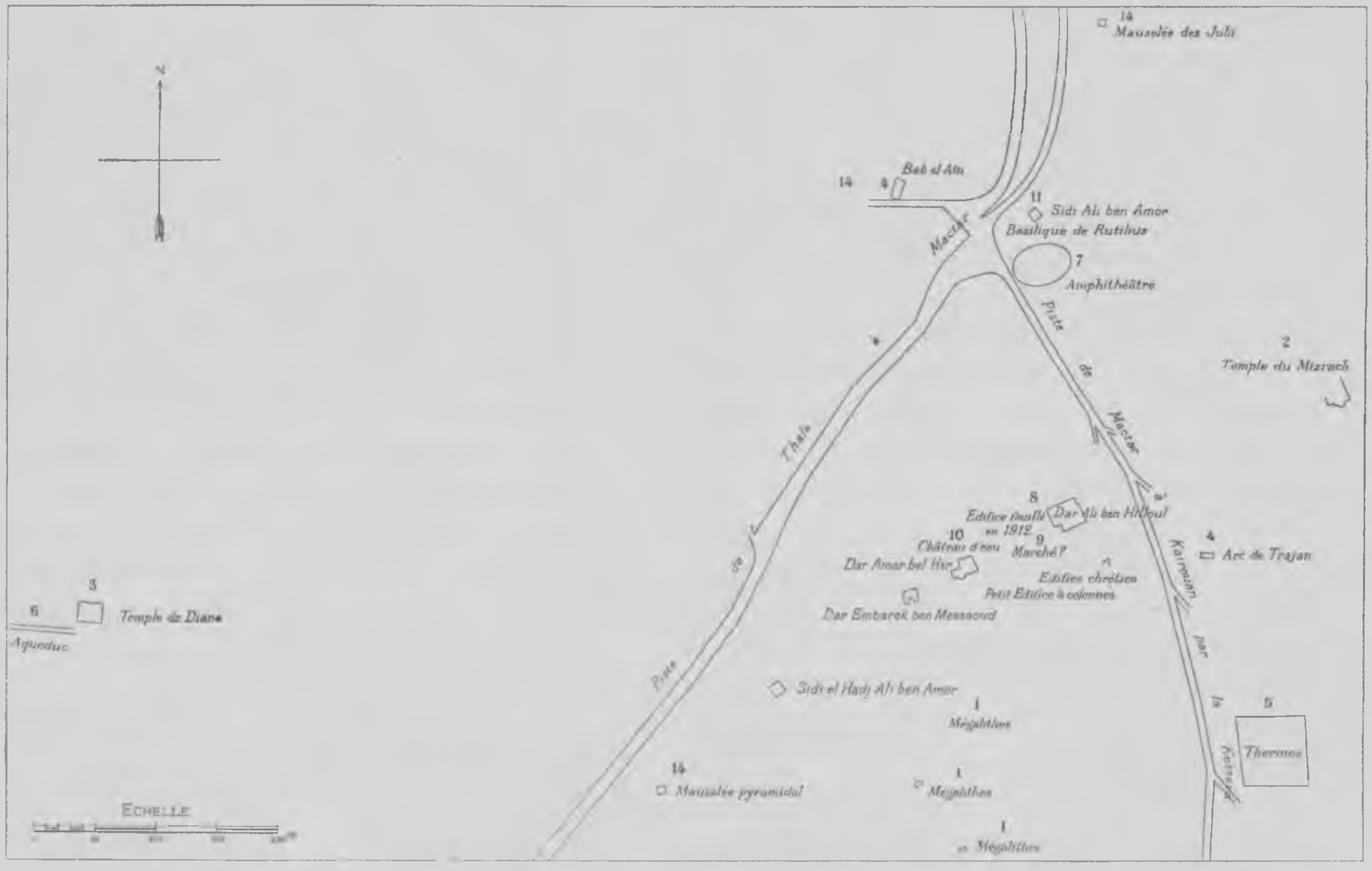
Maktar in the Atlas archéologique de la Tunisie

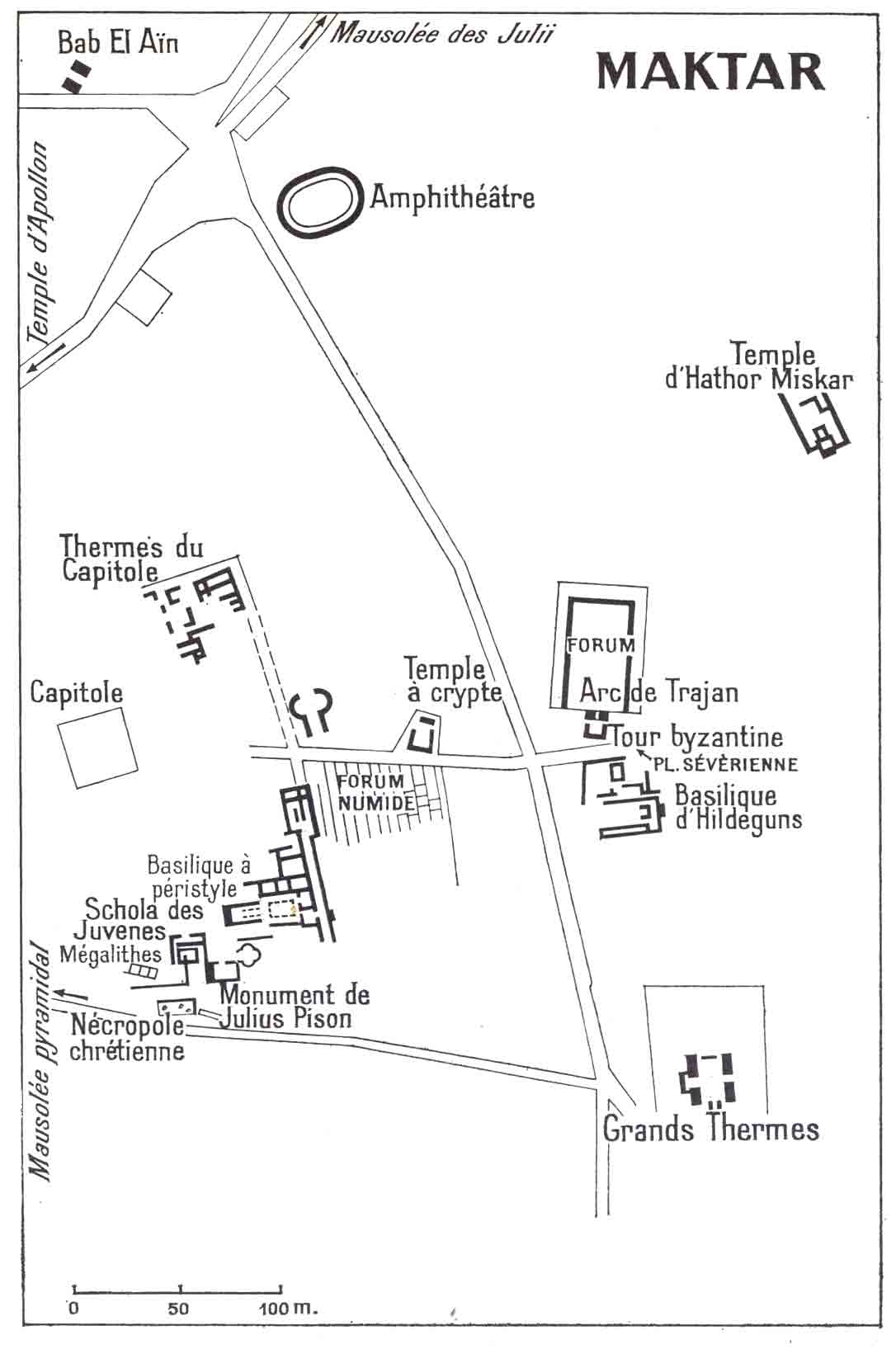
Plan of Maktar

In the 3rd century BC the Numidians built a strategic fortress at the site, chosen to control trade routes between Sbeitla, Kairouan, and El Kef. The establishment grew rapidly, and under Masinissa developed into a major center of Numidia. After the fall of Carthage in 146 BC, many Punic refugees flocked to Maktar, bringing their culture and skills. Buildings, civic organization, and language were strongly influenced by the Carthaginians.

Roman occupation at first retained the Punic government and administration through the consular-style magistracy of the sufetes, while Roman immigrants largely remained in a separate community (pagus). Mactaris grew into one of the richest cities in the province as a transit point for grain, oil, livestock, and textiles between Carthage, Sufetula, Thugga, and Tebessa. Under Trajan (97–117), the city was romanized. The city received a uniform Roman constitution and colony status, whereby all residents were automatically given Roman citizenship.

The troubles of the third century, which ushered in the decline of the Roman Empire, also affected Maktar. The decline was halted awhile under Diocletian (284–305). In late antiquity the Mactaris diocese of the Roman Church was founded, and Christianization of the city could be seen in the construction of numerous churches. The city was mentioned in the 5th-century Notitia provinciarum et civitatum Africae and the Peutinger Map. Maktar survived the invasion of the Vandals and became an important Byzantine fortress.

Maktar survived the Muslim invasions, but the devastating raid of the Beni Hilal in 1050 led to the complete destruction and abandonment of the site.

== Archaeology ==
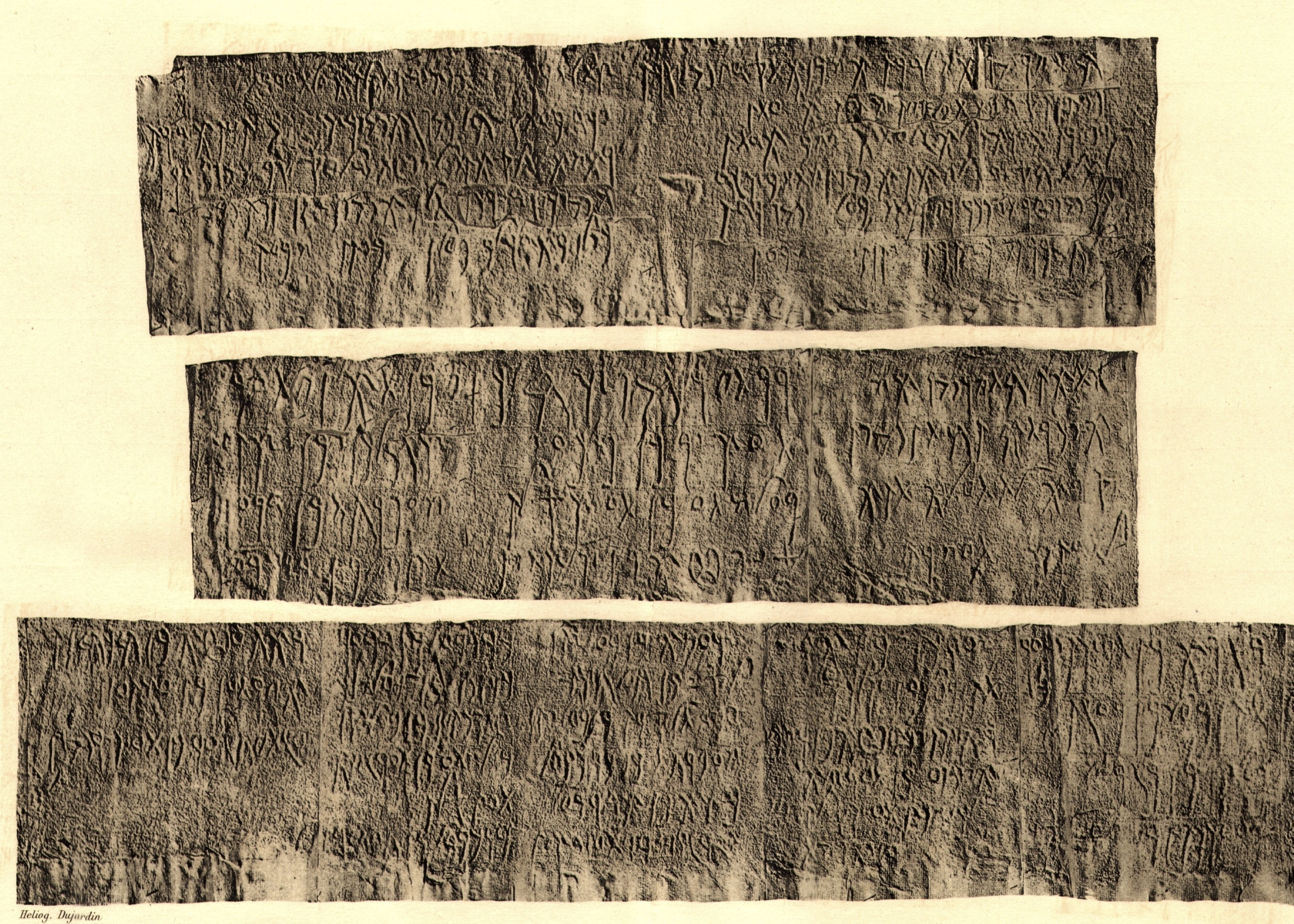
One of the Maktar inscriptions - the Punic language "grand dedicatory inscription"

Numerous inscriptions are recorded through the ruins. French archaeological excavations began in 1914, and were continued from 1944 on a large scale. Although not fully excavated, the ruins unearthed so far, especially of the thermal baths and the Schola of the Juvenes, mark this as one of the most remarkable ancient sites in Tunisia.

=== Pre-Roman structures ===
The site has several megaliths, large slabs evidently used in the burial of ashen remains. Excavations by Mansour Ghaki of an intact burial chamber uncovered many ceramics of various origins, both local and imported, dating from the early third century BC.

The site includes an example of Punic mausoleum pyramid, similar to the mausoleum of Atban at Dougga (Thugga). In addition, archaeologists have unearthed a Numidian-period public square that is thought to be the religious center of the city due to the presence of temples, which later housed a temple to Augustus and Rome.

The temple of Hathor Miskar is well known because of the extensive excavations that were carried out there, even if the remains are poorly preserved. At the center of the sanctuary, archaeologists have found an altar dated to about 100 BC.

The Tunisian government included the site in its proposal of 2012 to add various pre-Islamic monuments to the Unesco World Heritage List.

=== Trajan Forum ===
This rectangular paved gathering place was designed ca 116 AD under Trajan as a forum for the Roman population when Roman citizenship was granted to members of the local elite. (The indigenous population had its own forum 50m to the southwest.) The space was surrounded by a portico, and the south side is still dominated by the majestic and well-preserved Arch of Trajan.

=== Large baths ===
The Great Baths are among the best preserved of their kind in North Africa. The walls of the frigidarium rise to 15 m. The building was constructed around the year 200 AD and is decorated with oriental foliage on the capitals and with a beautiful mosaic floor.

=== Scholia Juvenum ===
Built around the year 200, this building complex was the meeting place of the "youth organization" or Brotherhood, a kind of militia of young men, whose duties included policing and especially tax collection. The organization in Maktar consisted of about 70 members, and as in other Roman provincial cities it temporarily played an important role. Membership in the strictly managed organization was a prerequisite for higher military service. The curriculum of the school included paramilitary exercises and sports, but also subjects such as finance, politics, and culture. The Brotherhood became increasingly influential over time, as rich citizens of provincial cities used it to resist the authority of the central government. In the year 238 the Emperor Gordian I himself joined the organization. Emperor Diocletian restored the school. In the Christian era the original building, called the Basilica, was used as a church, using a Punic sarcophagus from the adjacent necropolis as an altar.

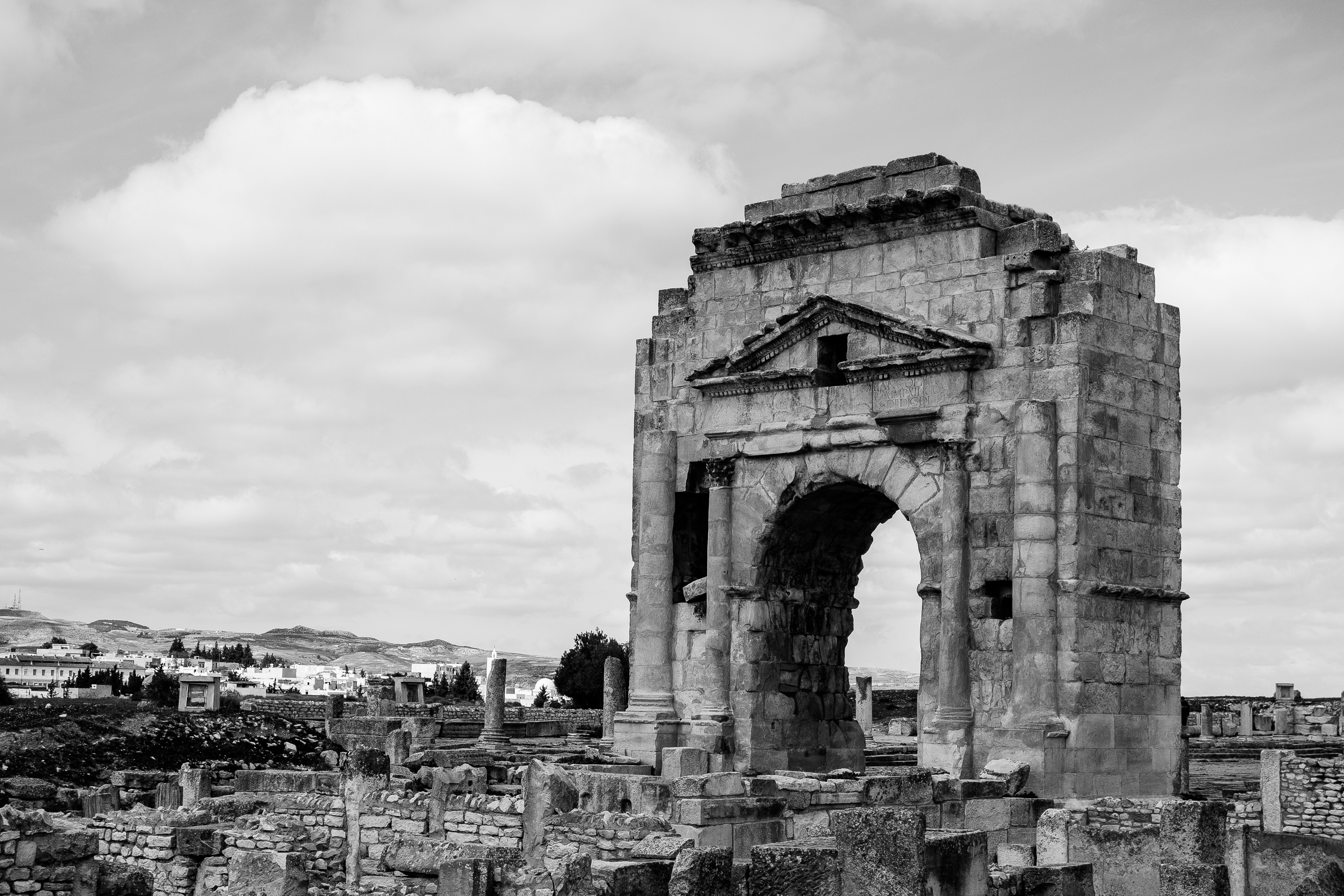
Arch of Trajan

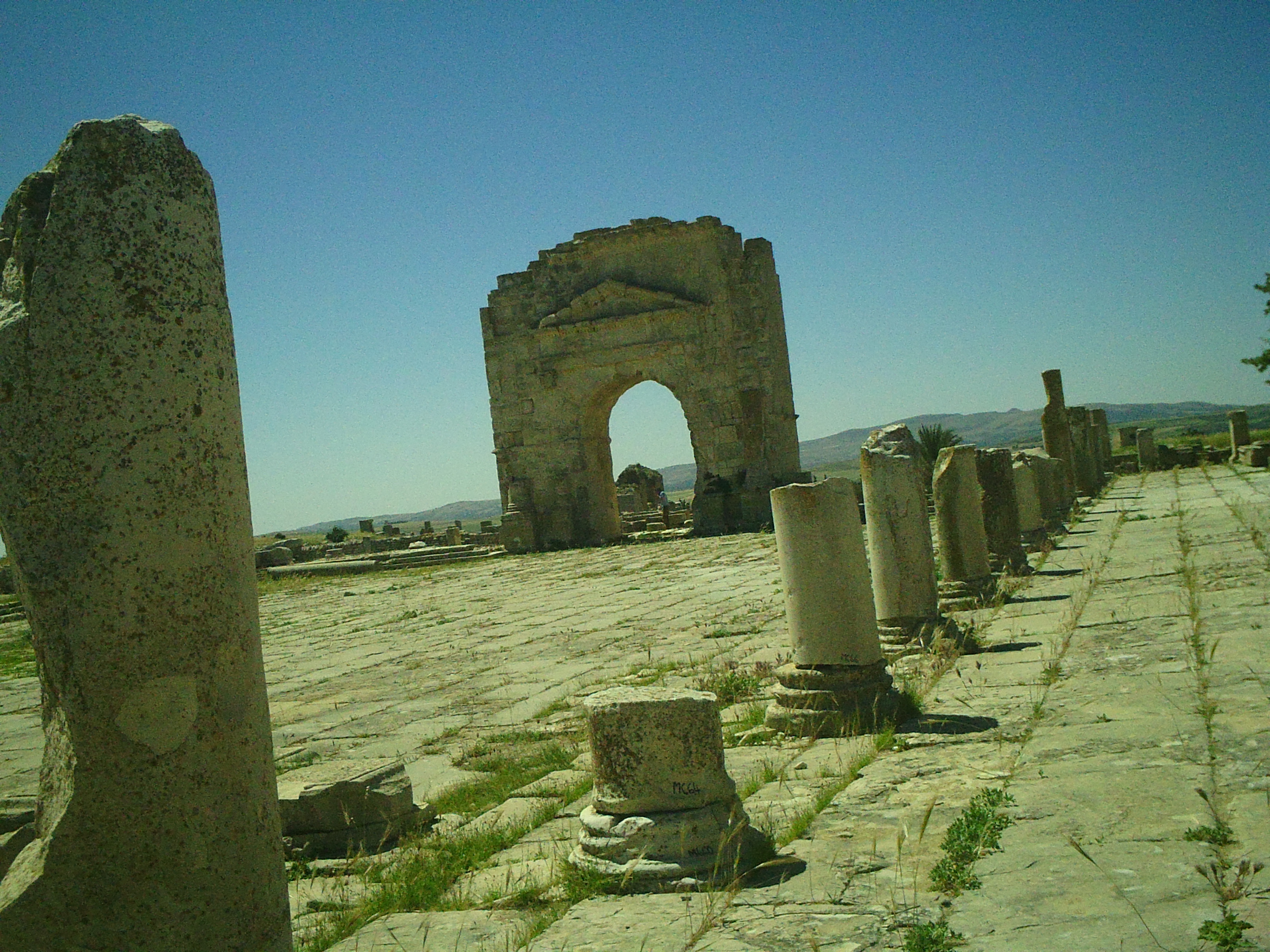
Forum and Arch of Trajan

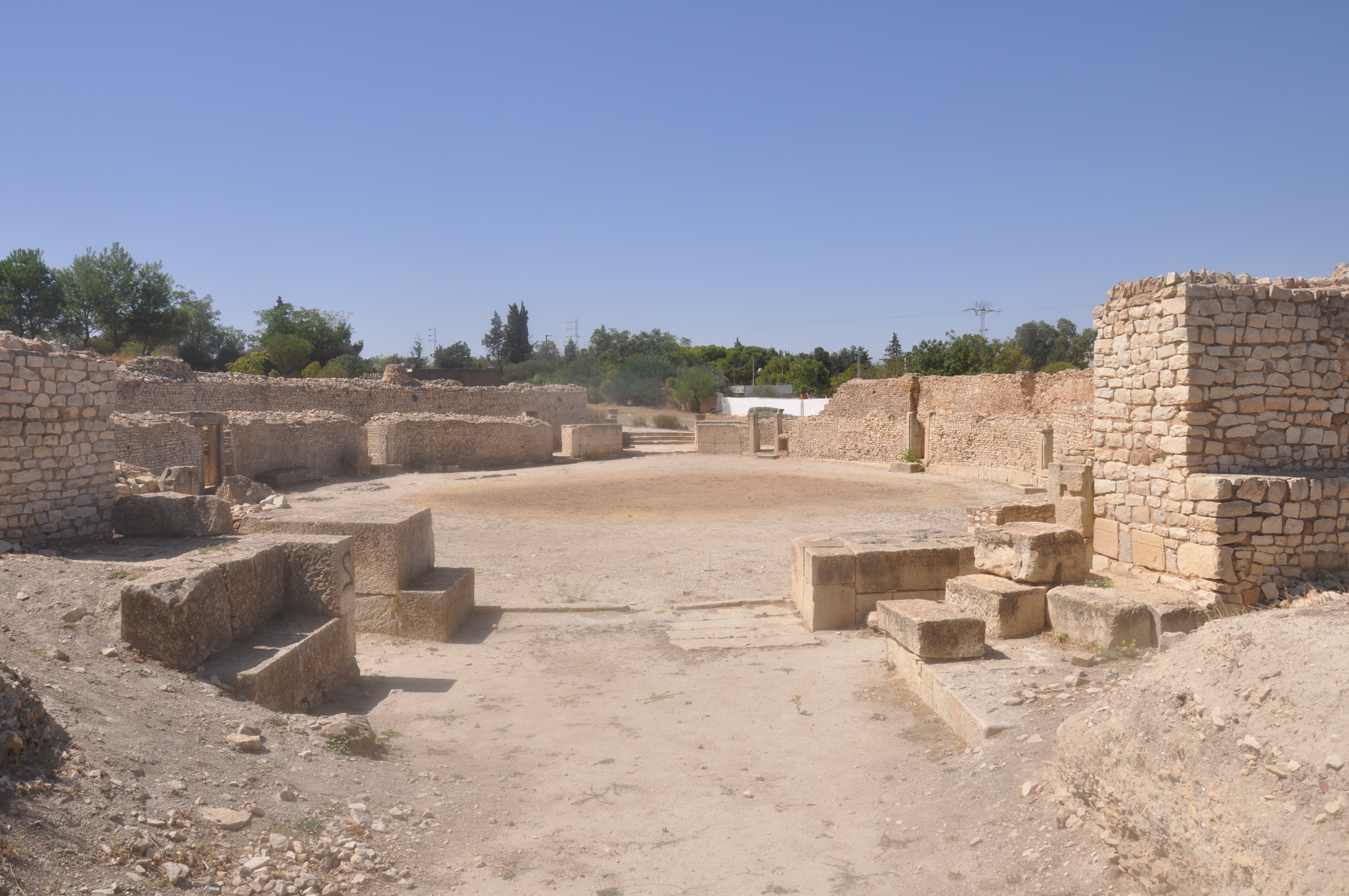
Amphitheatre

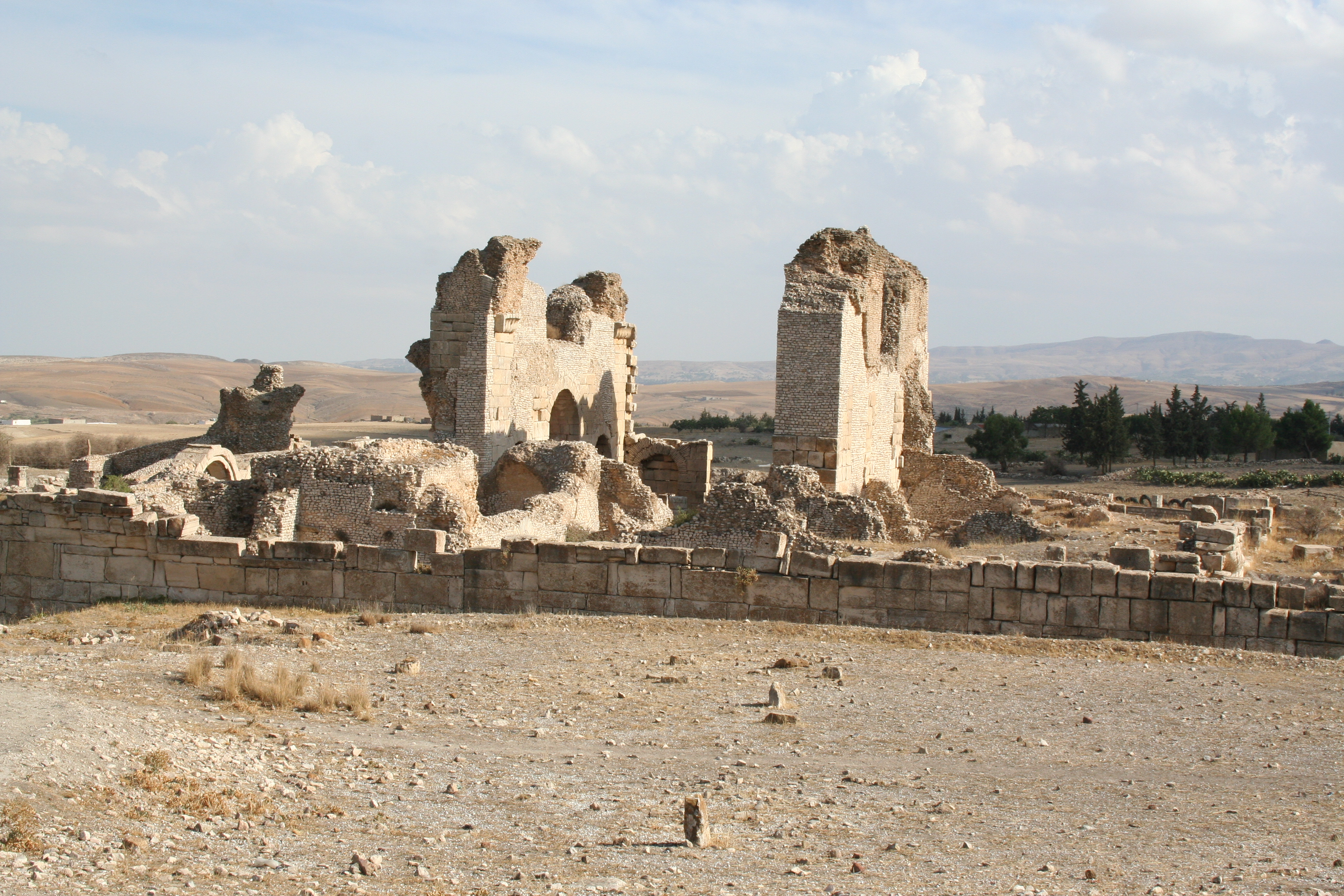
Thermal baths

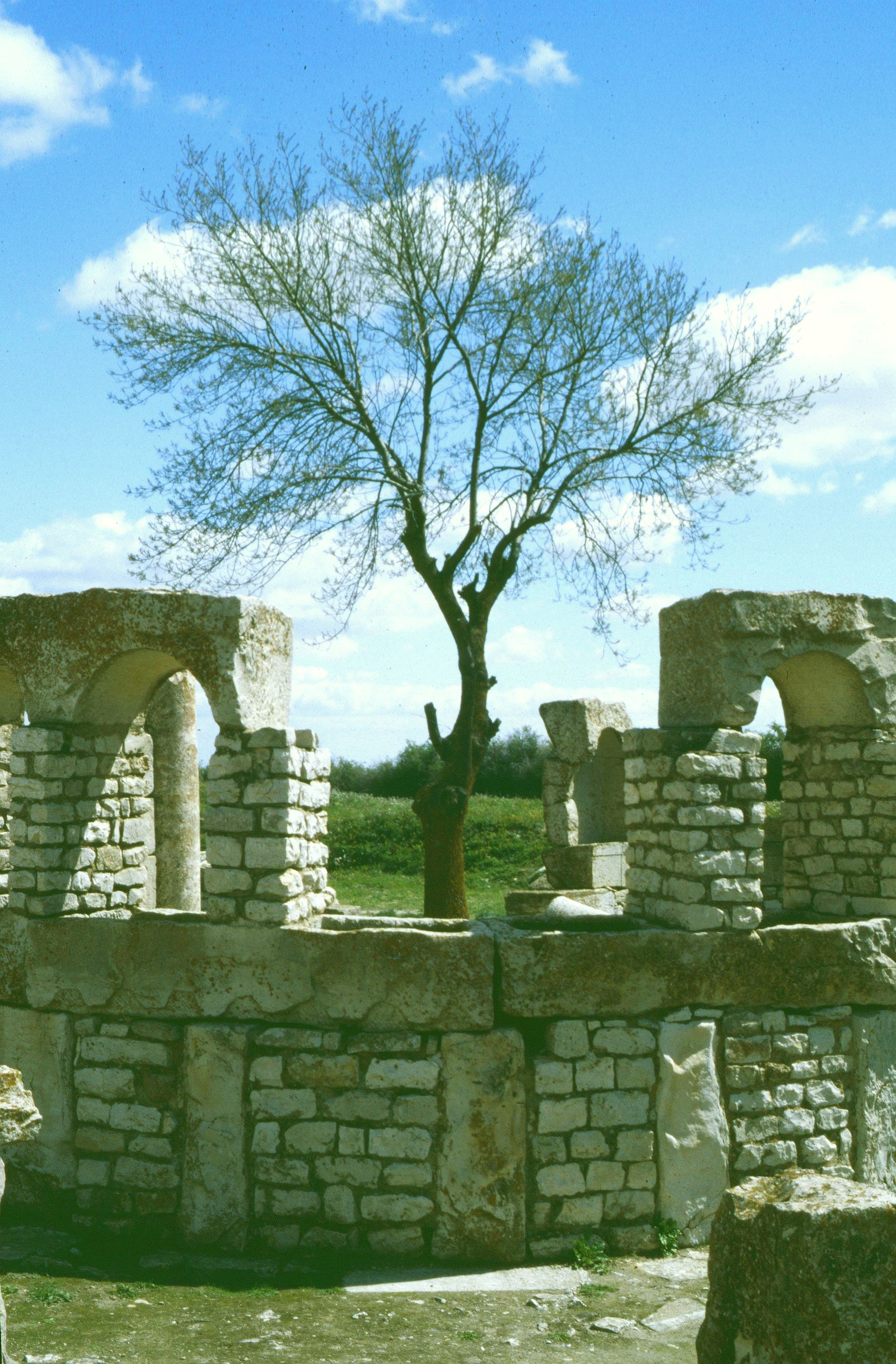
Schola Juvenum

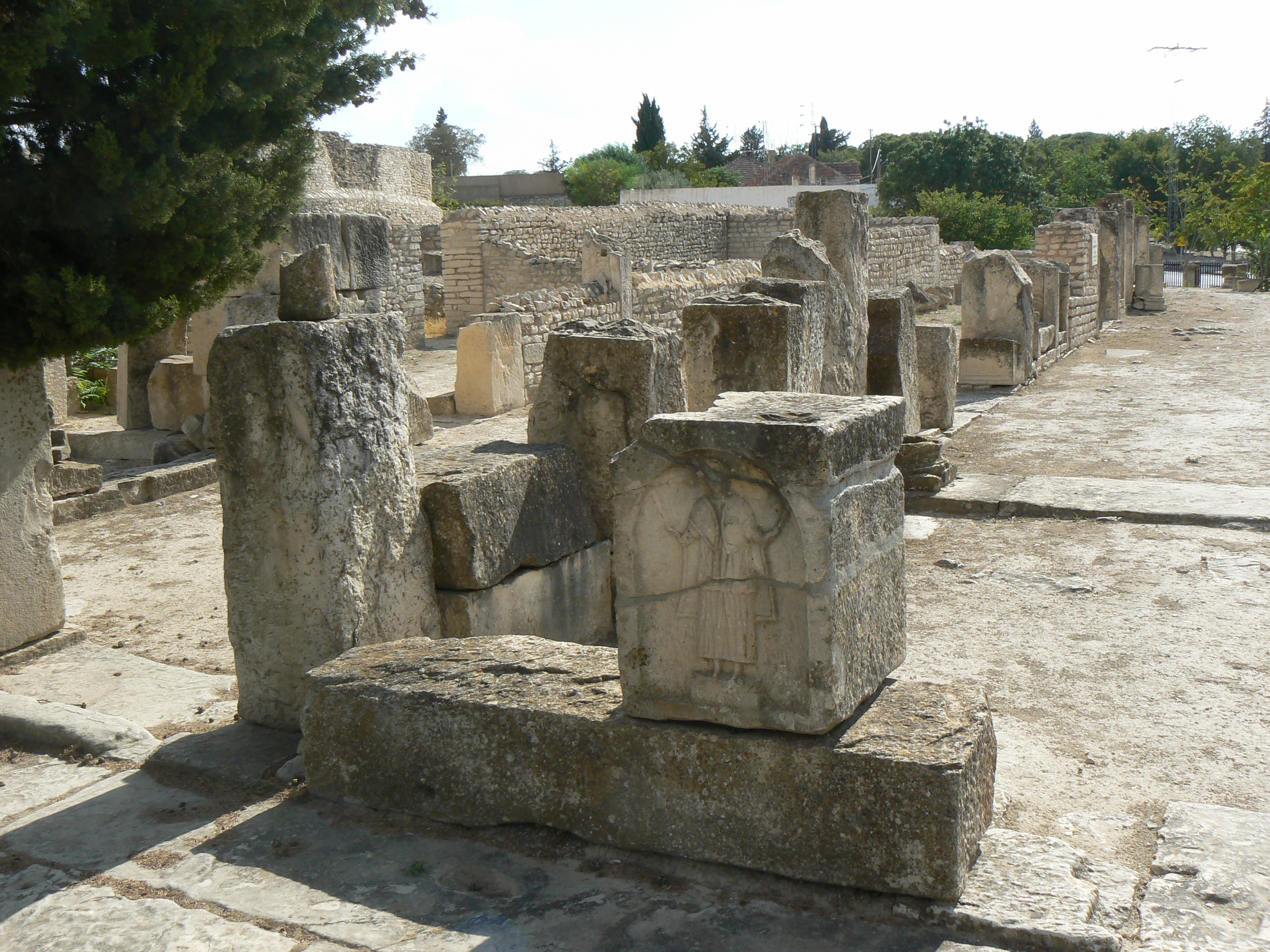
Basilica of Rutilius

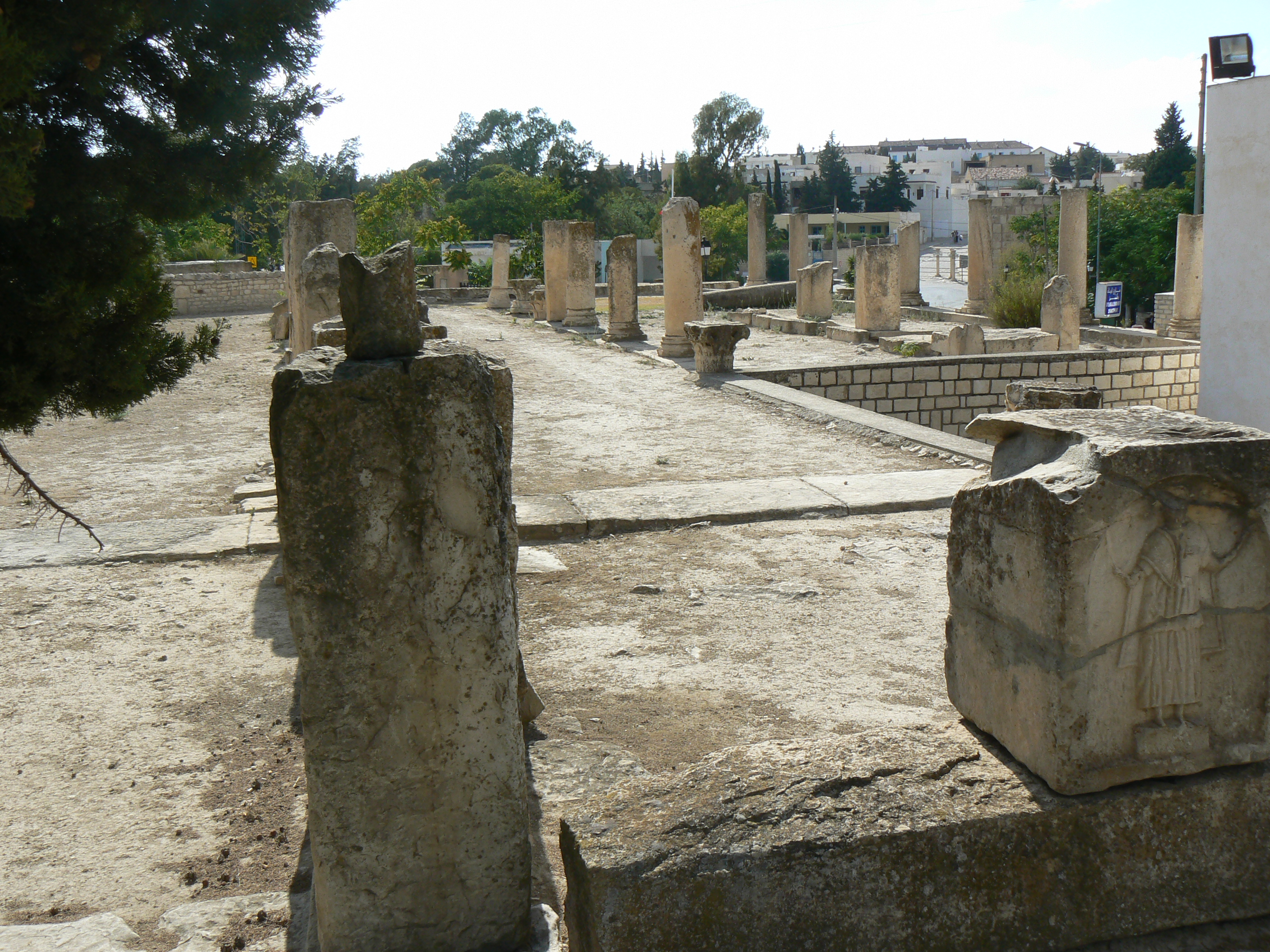
Basilica

== Bishopric ==
Although the Roman diocese effectively ceased operating with the arrival of the Islamic armies, the see remains a titular see of the Roman Catholic Church, and there have been 20 titular bishops since 1514. The current bishop is Pedro Dulay Arigo

Six bishops are known from antiquity, including:

- Marcus of Mactaris fl 325.
- Comparitor fl.411 (Donatist)
- Adelfius fl.484 (Catholic)
- Germanus
- Rutilius
- Victor 6th century

== Culture ==
Each year, the city hosts a festival called the "Maktaris Festival," which boosts the economy of the region.

== Population ==
2014 Census (Municipal)
Homes	Families	Males	Females	Total
3842	3359	6572	6970	13542
