= Mididi =

Coordinates: 35.79°N 9.07°E

Africa Proconsularis (125 AD)

Mididi (Punic: 𐤌𐤃𐤃𐤌, mddm, or 𐤌𐤃𐤃𐤉𐤌, MDDYM) was a Carthaginian and Roman settlement during antiquity, located at what is now Henchir-Medded, Tunisia. 14 neo-punic inscriptions, known as the Mididi inscriptions, were found in Mididi by René Basset.

== History ==
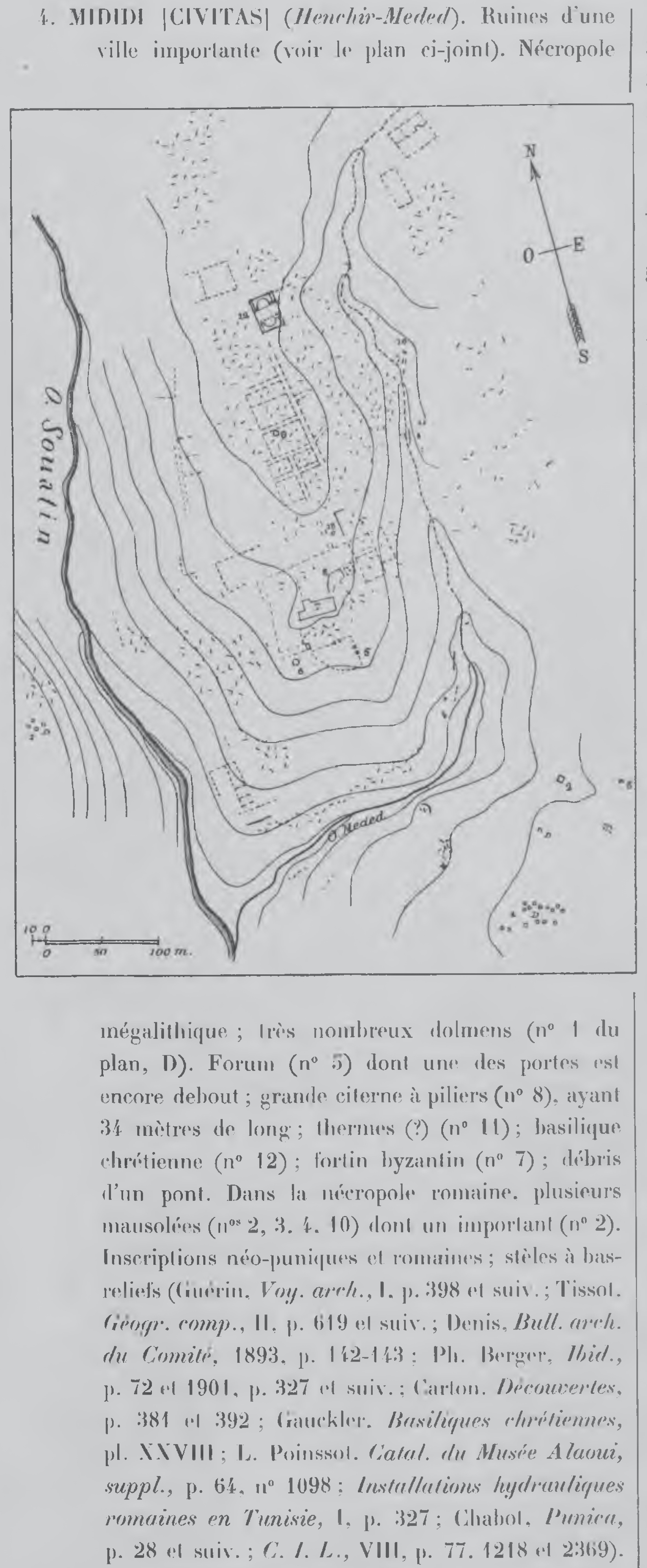
Mididi in the Atlas archéologique de la Tunisie

Mididi was part of the Roman province of Byzacena.

== Diocese ==
There are two bishops attributable to Mididi. The Catholic bishop Serenian attended the 411 Council of Carthage between the Catholic and Donatist bishops of Roman North Africa. On that occasion, the seat had no Donatist bishops. Eubodio took part in the 484 Synod of Carthage convened by the Arian king Huneric, after which Eubodio was exiled. Fulgentius of Ruspe also founded a monastery near Mididi at the beginning of the 6th century.

Today Mididi survives as a titular bishopric:

- Luís Gonzaga Fernandes (1965–1981)
- César Bosco Vivas Robelo (1981–1991)
- Luis Gleisner Wobbe (1991–), auxiliary bishop of La Serena.

== See also ==
- Maghrawa (Tunisia)

=== Bibliography ===
- Ghaki, Mansour (2015). "Toponymie et Onomastique Libyques: L'Apport de l'Écriture Punique/Néopunique" (PDF). In di Tolla, Anna Maria (ed.). La Lingua nella Vita e la Vita della Lingua: Itinerari e Percorsi degli Studi Berberi. Studi Africanistici: Quaderni di Studi Berberi e Libico-Berberi (in French). Vol. 4. Naples: Unior. pp. 65–71. ISBN 978-88-6719-125-3. ISSN 2283-5636.
