= Saharun =

Saharun is an off-road race and adventure organised by the Budapest-based Coimbra Ltd. Participants can enter in two categories: Race and Adventure. The event is open for 4WD and 2WD cars, trucks, motorcycles and quads.

The SAHARUN also features a charity project, with the objective to help the countries it visits. The charity partner of the race is the African-Hungarian Union. Aids are gathered by the AHU, the organisers and also by the participating teams.

== History ==
The start of the first edition of the SAHARUN was scheduled for 16 March 2011. The destination was Tunisia. Just days before the start a revolution took part in the North-African country, forcing the organisers to postpone the start.

After closely watching the events in Tunisia, and seeing a normalised situatiuation, a new start date was made public: 8 March 2012.

In 2013 the SAHARUN will return in Tunisia. The route was published at the beginning of April. (see below)

== SAHARUN 2012 - route, teams and results ==
Saharun Adventure 2012

Budapest - Maranello - Civitavecchia - Tunis - Tozeur - Douz - Ksar Ghilane - El Borma - Tataouine - Monastir

position	start #	team name	country	car	team leader
RACE
winner	01	NH Aquincum Motorsport	Hungary	Toyota Land Cruiser	Bozsóki Bence
2nd	08	White Elephant Team	Poland	Toyota Land Cruiser HZJ 78	Bernard Afeltowicz
3rd	09	Solter RS Team	Poland	Nissan Patrol Y60	Piotr Siltys
4th	02	Afrikaland Rally Raid Team	Hungary	Toyota Land Cruiser	Borsa Miklós
5th	03	BOMBA! Racing	Hungary	Isuzu D-Max	Kőváry Barna
6th	06	Metál-Sheet	Hungary	Toyota Land Cruiser HDJ 100	Harangi Emil
7th	32	Nemtulatunk	Hungary	Toyota Land Cruiser HDJ 80	Kővári Viktor
8th	07	Palica	Hungary	Land Rover Discovery 2.5D	Sajbán Mihály
9th	05	Fundamenta Team 2.	Hungary	Ford Ranger	Pintér László
10th	04	Fundamenta Team 1.	Hungary	Toyota FJ Cruiser	Nagy Ádám
ADVENTURE
	31	HVV Afrika team	Hungary	Toyota Hilux 4WD	Hajnóczi Pál
	33	Teve Team	Hungary	Toyota Land Cruiser LX 2.5 TD	Szalai Tamás
	34	Uncle John's Team I.	Hungary	Toyota Hilux	Fazekas János Gábor
	35	Uncle John's Team II.	Hungary	Toyota Land Cruiser	Pozsár Viktor
special award*	36	Vitéz Kürtős Team	Hungary	Dacia Logan 1.4 8V Laureate	Bálint F Gyula
STAFF
	RD	Saharun RD	Hungary	Toyota Hilux Pickup Double Cab 4WD	Polgár András
	00	Saharun 00	Hungary	Nissan Patrol 3.0 TDI GR	Lukács Tóth Kálmán
	M1	Medical I	Hungary	Toyota Land Cruiser	Gyurkó Gábor
	M2	Medical II	Hungary	Nissan Patrol	Dr. Takács Zoltán

- Vitéz Kürtős Team received the special award being the most charitable team.

== SAHARUN 2013 - The Route ==
Budapest - Maranello - Civitavecchia - Tunis - Gafsa - Douz - Tembaine - Dakhanis - Ksar Ghilane - Sfax - Monastir
