= Maktar and Mididi inscriptions =

Punic inscriptions in Tunisia

Maktar inscriptions
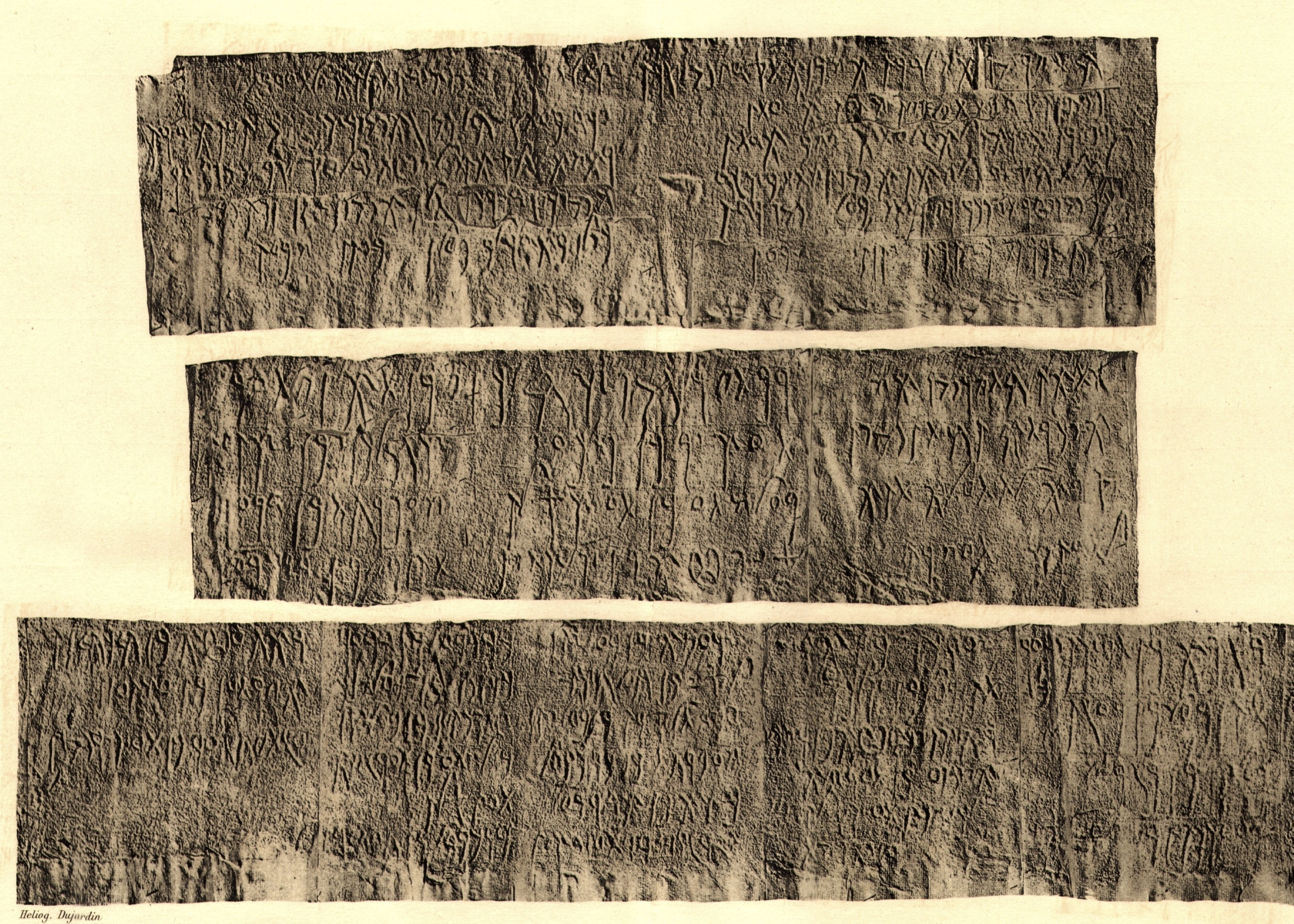
- The Grand Dedicatory Inscription, in ten parts (KAI 145)
- Writing: Punic
- Discovered: 1892

The Maktar and Mididi inscriptions are a number of Punic language inscriptions, found in the 1890s at Maktar and Mididi, Tunisia. A number of the most notable inscriptions have been collected in Kanaanäische und Aramäische Inschriften, and are known as are known as KAI 145–158.

More than 150 such inscriptions were known by the end of the 19th century.

== Temple of Hathor Miskar ==
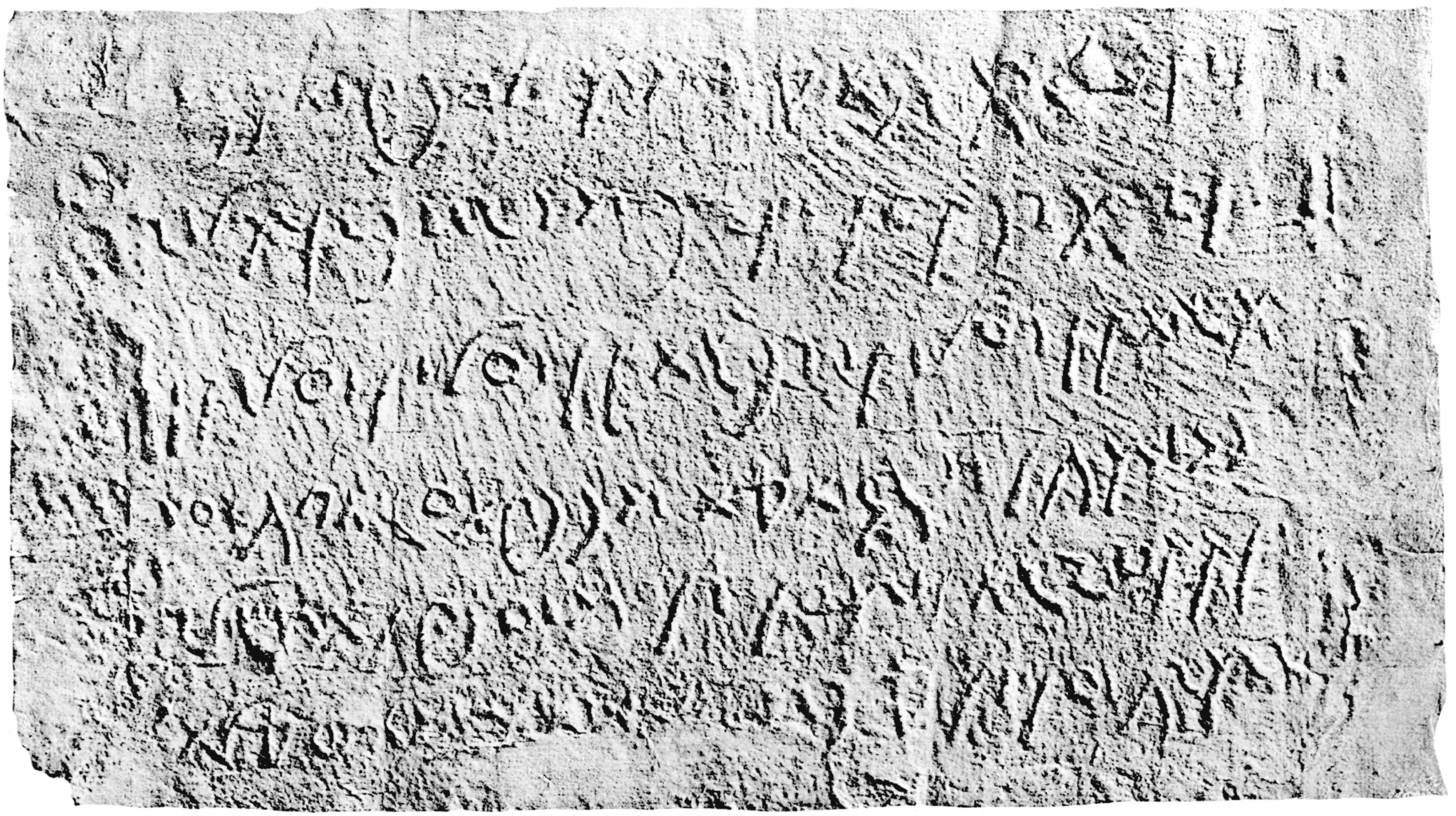
Second Dedicatory Inscription (KAI 146)

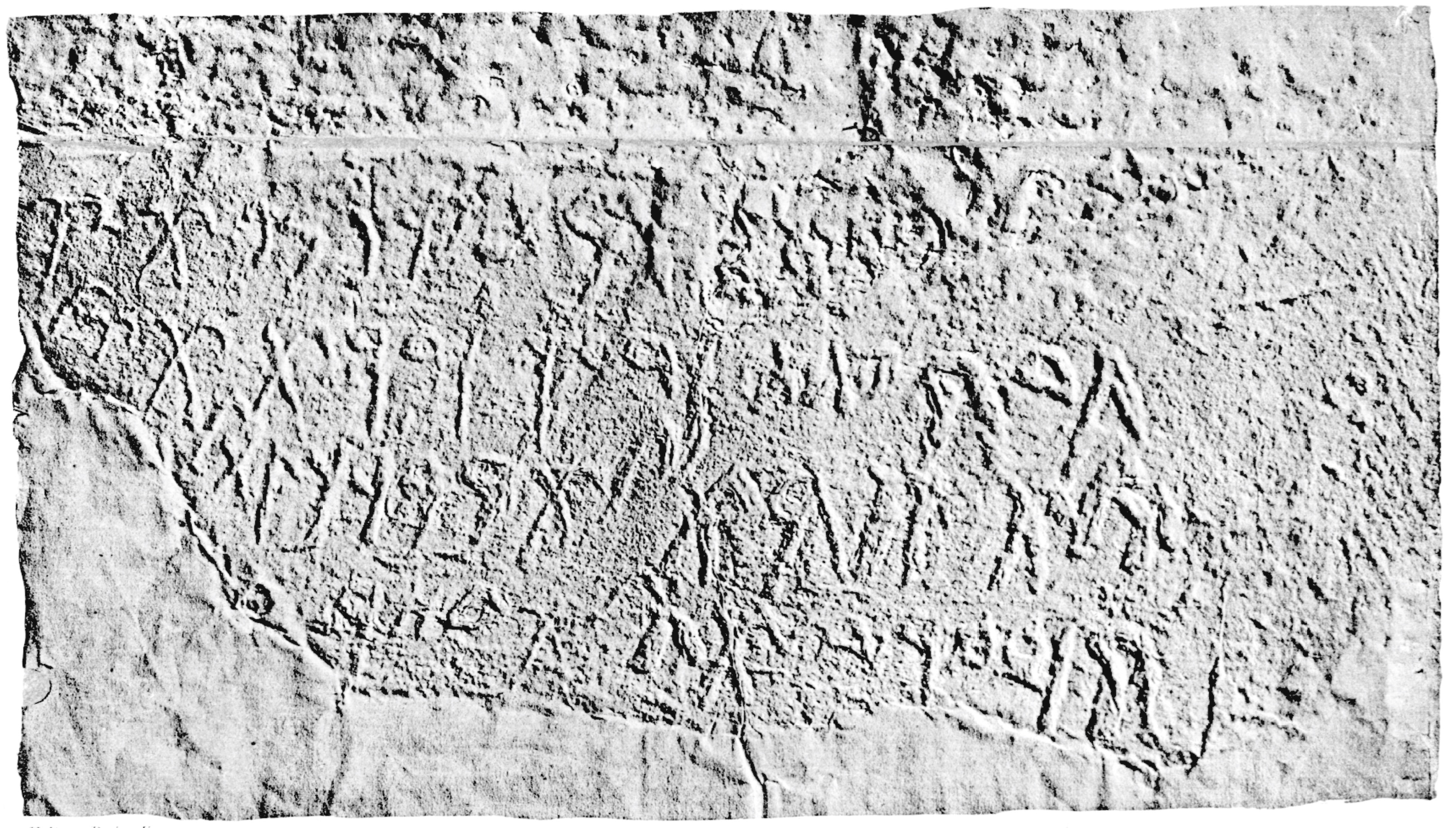
Votive inscription (KAI 147)

A number of inscriptions were found in 1892 during excavation of the Temple of Hathor Miskar.

They were first published by Philippe Berger in 1901, and are known as KAI 145–147.

== Ain Bab ==
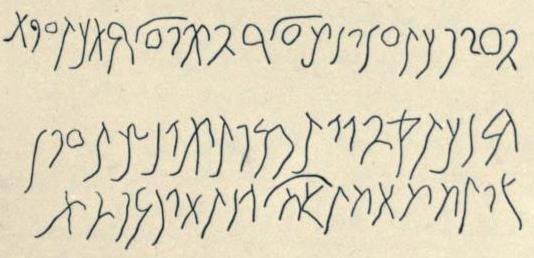
KAI 152 (also NE 436,11)

In 1901 Paul Gauckler sent to the Comité des travaux historiques et scientifiques stampings of 6 monuments found in Maktar, from the Punico-Roman cemetery next to the Aïn-el-Bab gate. These are known as KAI 148-153 and RES 161–166.

== Mididi ==
In 1901, René Basset sent to the Comité des travaux historiques et scientifiques stampings of 18 monuments and inscriptions found in the excavation of Mididi, of which 14 were neo-punic funerary inscriptions. These are known as KAI 154-158 and RES 167–180.

== Bibliography ==
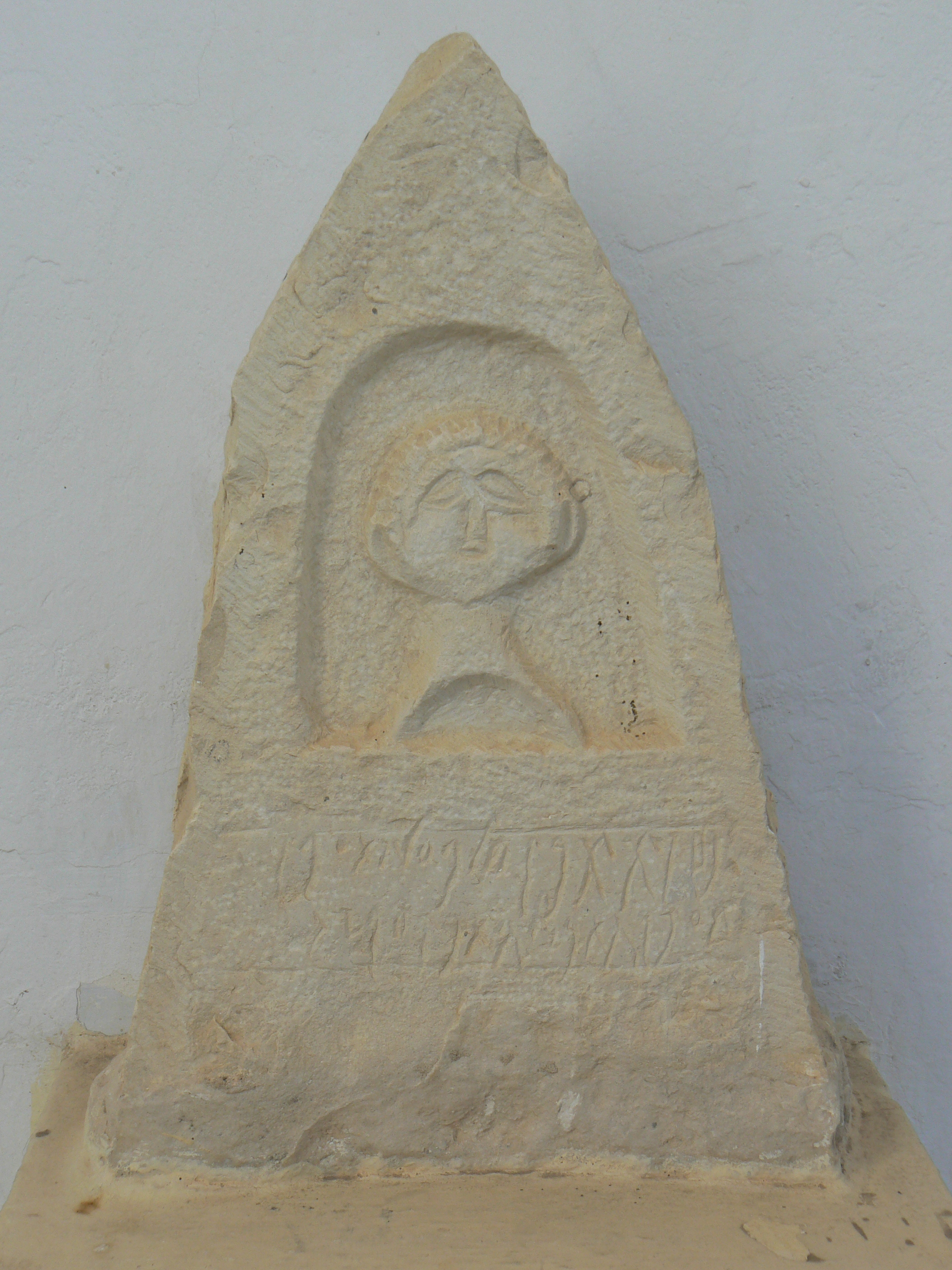
An inscription in the Maktar museum

Temple of Hathor Miskar inscriptions

- Text-book of North-Semitic Inscriptions, Maktar, 59 A, B, C; p. 150-157

Ain Bab and Mididi

- RES
- Les inscriptions de Maktar, 24 janvier 1890, Philippe Berger, Comptes rendus des séances de l'Académie des Inscriptions et Belles-Lettres Année 1890 34-1 pp. 35–42
- Bulletin archéologique du Comité des travaux historiques et scientifiques
