= Ksar Ghilane =

Oasis in Tunisia

Ksar Ghilane also known as Henchir Tébournouk is a Tunisian oasis, archaeological site and town of Tataouine Governorate located at 33° 00′ 31″ N, 9° 36′ 59″ E.

== Location ==
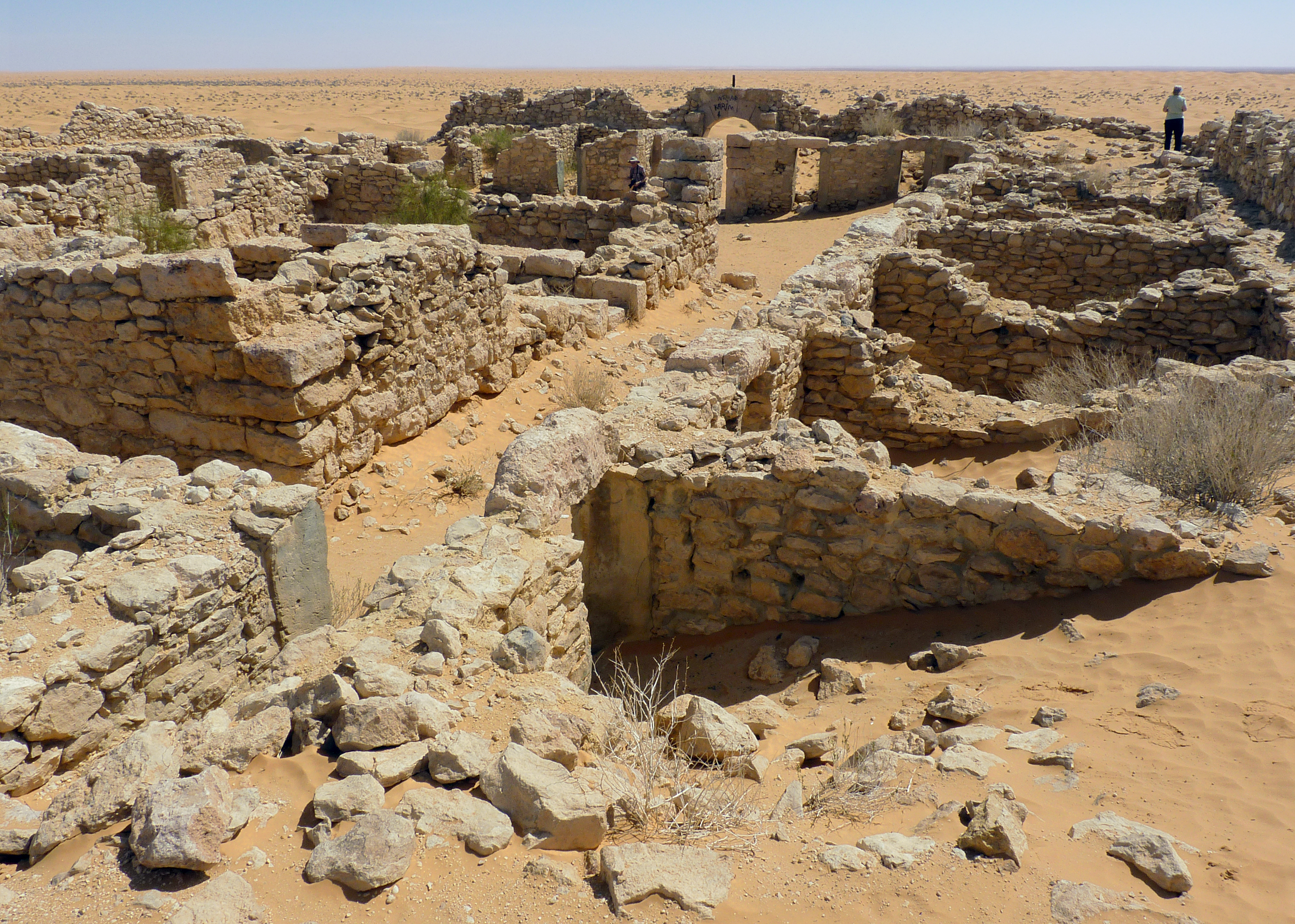
Ksar Ghilane Roman ruins of Castellum Tisavar, the "limes" Southern most border of the Roman empire

Ksar Ghilane (قصر غيلان) is an oasis of southern Tunisia located on the eastern limit of the Grand Erg Oriental. Renowned for being the most southerly of the Tunisian oases and one of the gates of the Tunisian Sahara desert, the oasis is fed by a hot source water in which one can bathe and with alleged thermal virtues. Ksar Ghilane has long been difficult to reach but is now connected by an asphalt road to Douz (80 kilometers to the north) or Matmata: it can be now accessed by all-terrain vehicles or private or rental cars.

== Economy ==
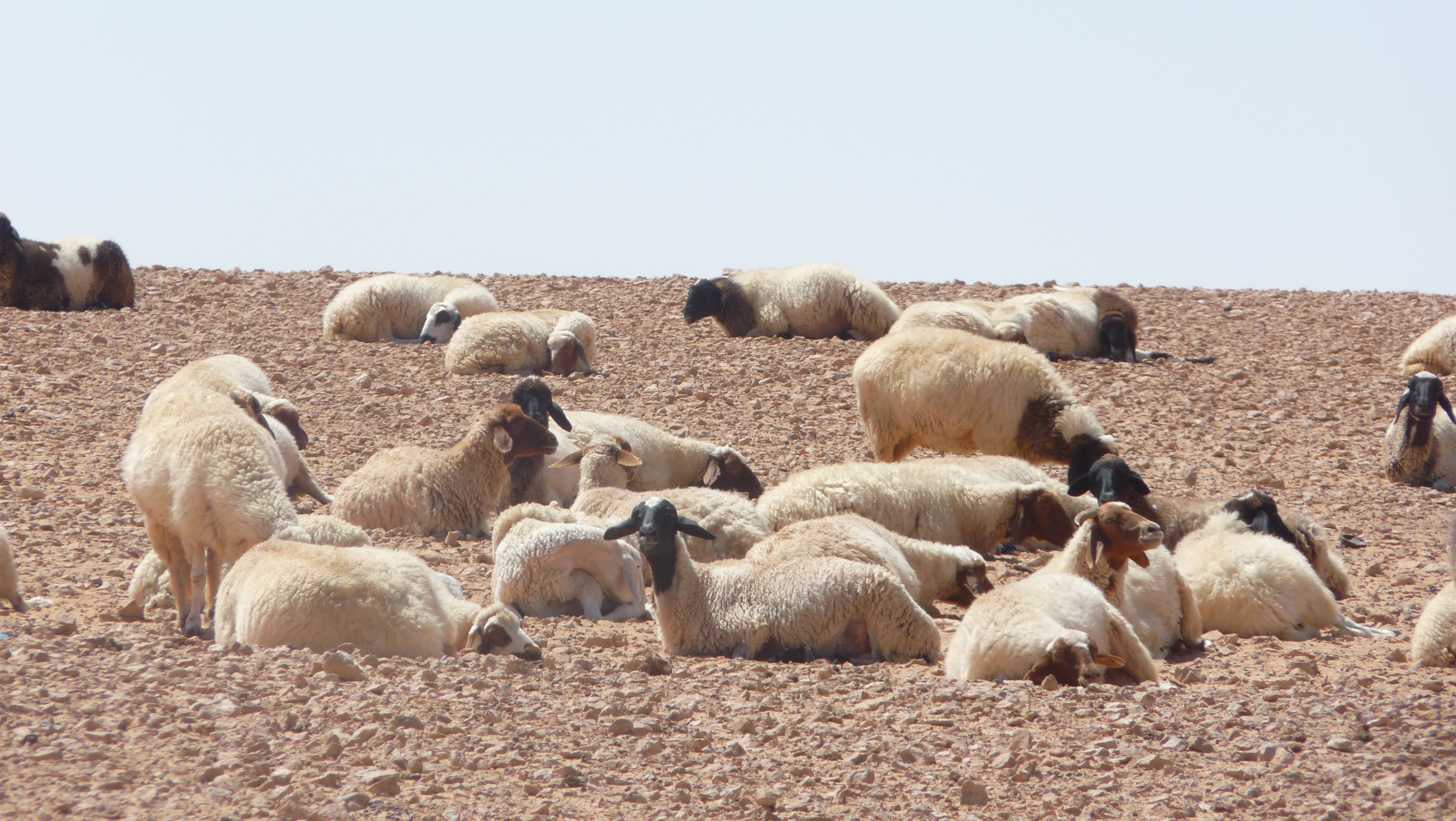
Ksar-Ghilane Oasis

Ksar Ghilane hosts some fifty now sedentarized formerly nomadic families living from date palm agriculture, the raising of goats and sheep and an increasingly important tourist activity. For tourism, several activities are on offer: ATV quad biking, motorcycling, horseback riding or camel trekking on dromedaries. Tourists can enjoy the sandy landscapes while basking in the relative freshness of the oasis and the comfort of swimming in a hot spring (as nights in the desert can get cooler).

There are three campsites with Berber tents and a luxury hotel with about 60 air-conditioned tents, a guest house and a ranch with private rooms for overnight stays. In addition to those in the 3 campsites, some cafes and a restaurant are located around the hot spring.

== History ==
As its name suggests (ksar means "castle" in Arabic), the oasis contains fortifications:

Less than a kilometer away from the palm trees stand the ruins of the Roman castellum named Tisavar. Build at the latest under emperor Commodus (180‑192 CE), it was a border post on the Western portion of the limes tripolitanus, i.e. the Southern limes, or border of the Roman empire which, in Tunisia, follows the edge of the Sahara desert. Though partially covered by sand drift, three structures built on a hill remain visible today: The fortress with a small portion of its rampart walkway next to the entry gate still standing, and in its South-West a rectangular building of ca 12x8.5 meters. Opposite the fortress' gate is another building with rooms looking like small cells gathered in a rectangular shape with rounded angles around a rectangular central courtyard: those small rooms were the living quarters of the Legio III Augusta from the Roman Army of Africa and in the center of the courtyard, a temple dedicated to Jupiter has been found. A bit lower on the dune a trefoiled-shaped small construction has been excavated and shown to function as a chapel (a votive writing dedicating it to the local genie of Tisavar was found in it)

The Tunisian government requested (on Feb 17th, 2012) for the Tisavar Roman ruins for be included in a future classification on the UNESCO World Heritage List.

In 1906, large deposits of phosphates and iron were found in the area prompting the construction of a railway track to connect the mining area to the rest of the network.

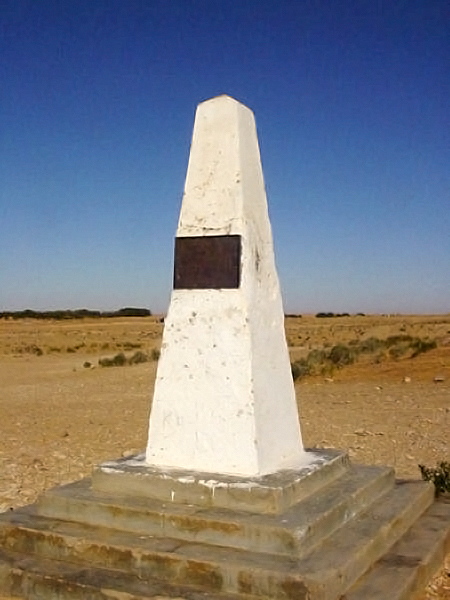
General Leclerc and Free French army Forces memorial column (1943 battle of Ksar Ghilane)

During World War II the town was involved in the battle of Ksar Ghilane, part of the Tunisia Campaign. One kilometer to the east of this battle site stands a commemorative stele, locally known as General Leclerc's column. The stela's writing reads:

"Here, from February 23rd to March 10th 1943, General Leclerc and Force L, coming from Chad, successfully supported the assault of the enemy forces, inflicting severe losses on them."

In 2001, the television show The Amazing Race 1 went through the town, and in 2011 the Saharun road race went through the town.

In 2010, a Martian (Shergottite) meteorite fell close to the oasis. It was analyzed and approved as an official meteorite under the Ksar Ghilaine 002 name. It is the 100th meteorite of Martian origin ever collected on earth.
