= Ksar Chenini =

Ksar in Tataouine, Tunisia

Coordinates: 32°54′44″N 10°15′43″E

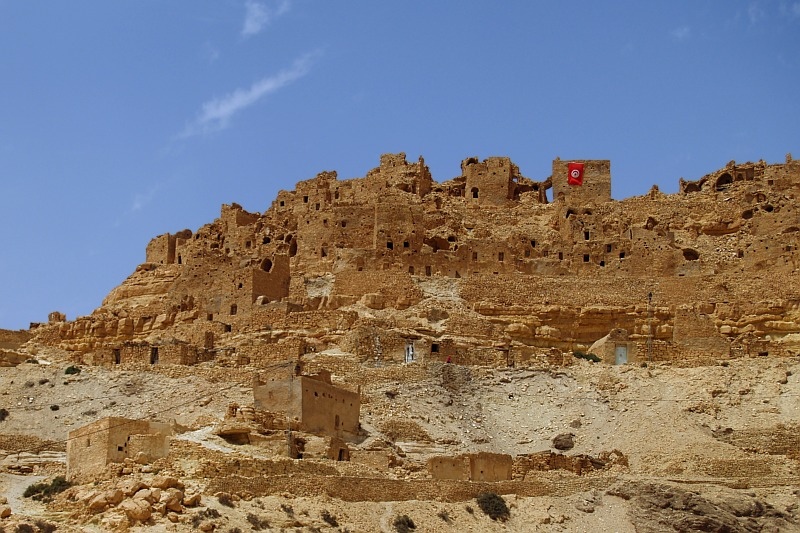
Ksar Chenini

Ksar Chenini is a ksar located in Chenini in the governorate of Tataouine, Tunisia.

== Location ==
Ksar Chenini is located on the crest of a peak overlooking the new village of Chenini at 150m above sea level. It has been qualified by Abdesmad Zaïed as "one of the most imposing" in the country.

== History ==
The ksar used to be a fortified village and the site is very old since a ksar is attested from the 12th century.

On the 10th of January 2020, the Tunisian government proposed the site for future classification as a UNESCO World Heritage.

== Building ==
The ksar has an undetermined number of ghorfas due to the damaged state of the site. It's mainly built over two floors. Herbert Popp and Abdelfettah Kassah give an estimate of over 200 at its peak. A restoration campaign has been launched by the National Heritage Institute in the 2000s.

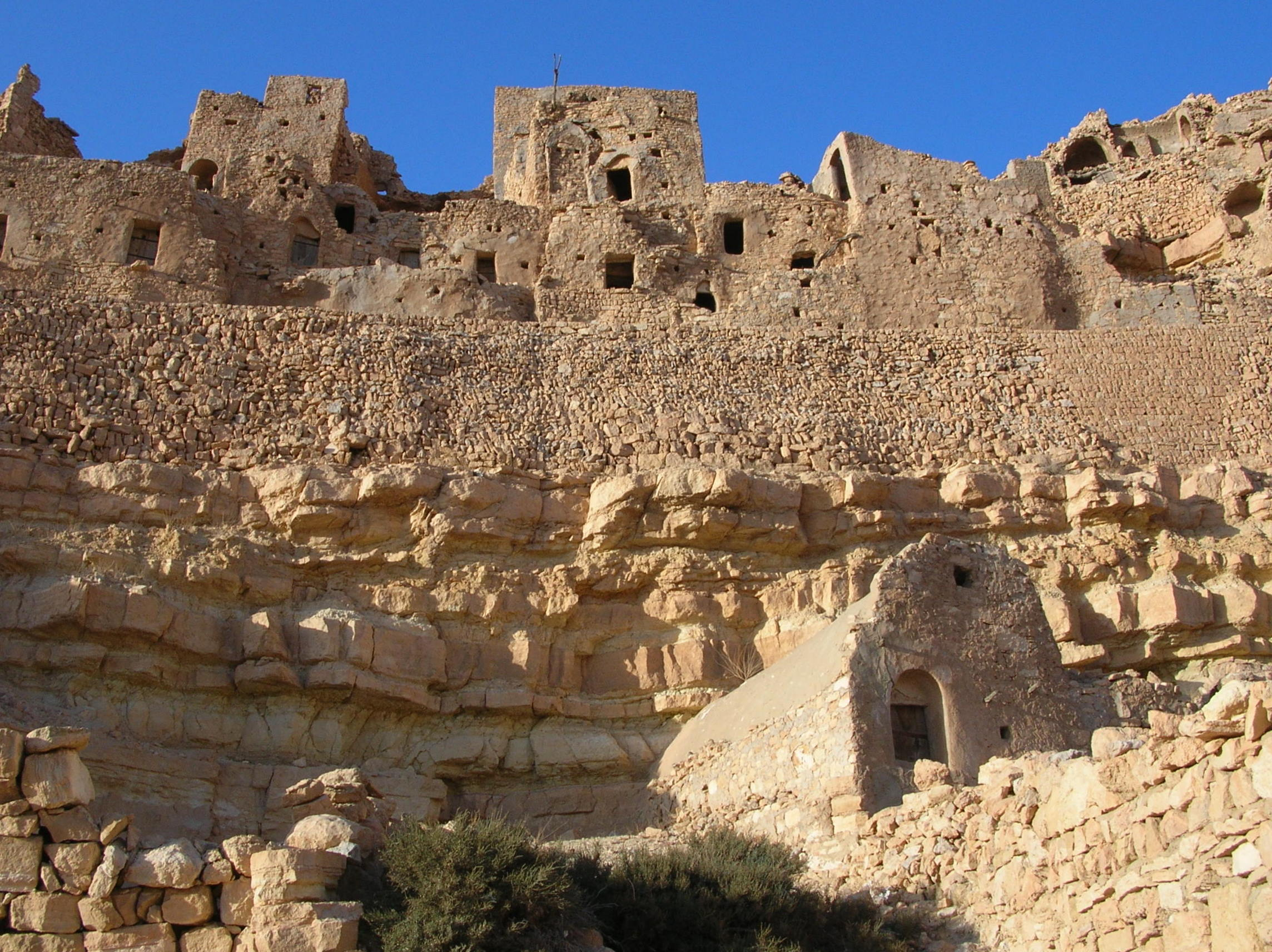
Overview of some Gorfas.

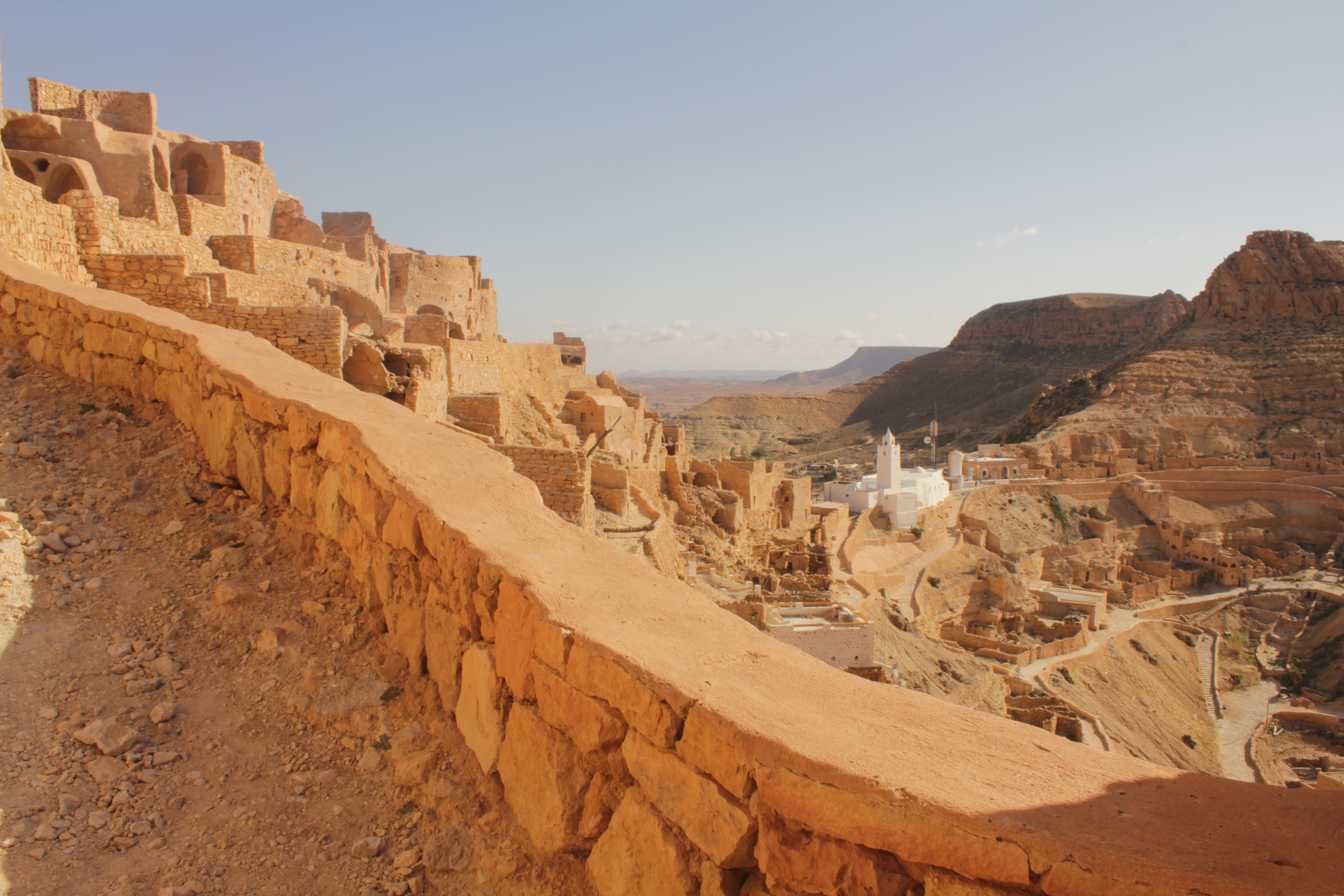
A walkway to the Ksar.

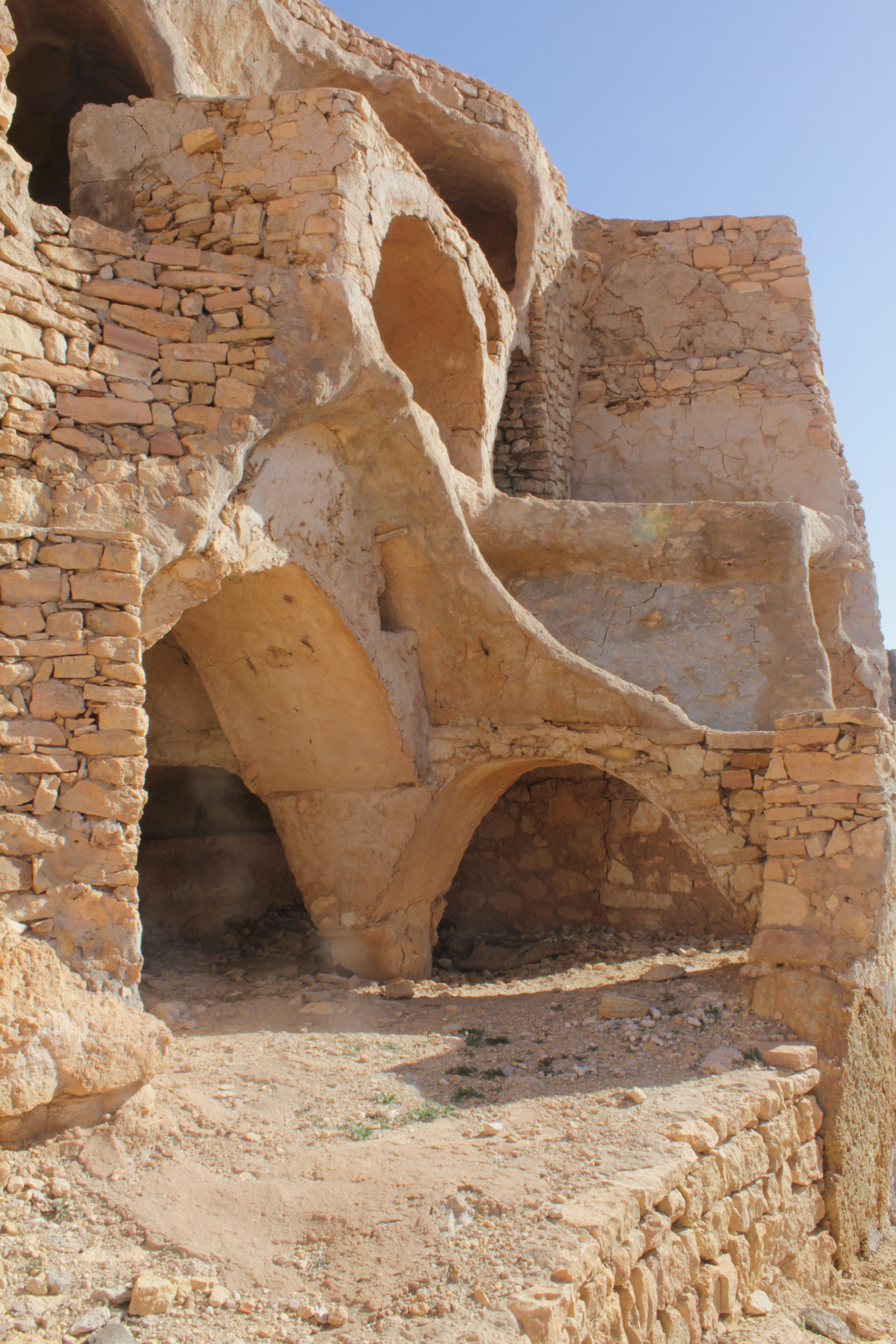
Vaulf of ghorfas.

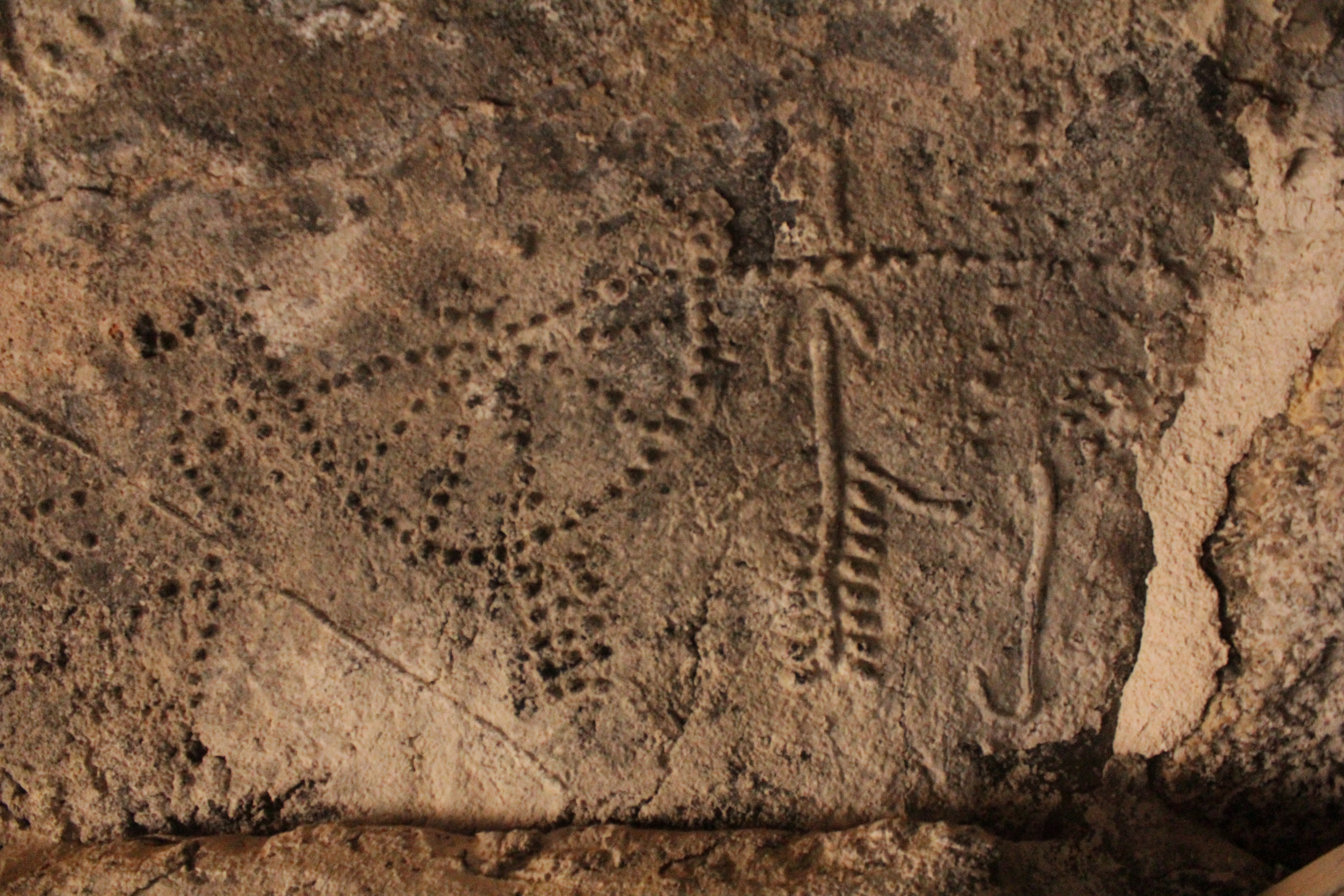
Decoration inside a ghorfa.
