= Globalize the intifada =

Palestinian resistance slogan

"Globalize the intifada" is a slogan that has been used to advocate for international support of Palestinian resistance against Israeli occupation, as well as other issues that people see as tied to the Palestinian cause. The Arabic word intifada (Arabic: اِنْتِفَاضَة intifāḍa) means "a shaking off" and can refer to a popular uprising or rebellion. In the context of the Israeli–Palestinian conflict, intifada refers to Palestinian resistance against Israeli occupation or Israel, including both violent and nonviolent methods of resistance. It refers especially to the First Intifada (1987–1993) and the Second Intifada (2000–2005).

Some scholars, politicians, and Jewish groups have criticized the slogan as inciting political violence, terrorism, and antisemitism. These critics argue that the phrase is closely associated with violence against Israelis and Jews, particularly the Second Intifada. During the Gaza war, allegations of antisemitism related to Gaza solidarity protests at universities focused on use of the phrase, along with others, such as "from the river to the sea". In the aftermath of the 2025 Bondi Beach shooting targeting a Hanukkah event, a number of opinion articles cited a connection between the phrase and the shooting, and some police departments arrested people for using it.

== Intifada ==
The word intifāḍa (Arabic: اِنْتِفَاضَة) is an Arabic verbal noun (مصدر, maṣdar) of instance (اسم مرة, ism marra) of the verb intafaḍa (اِنْتَفَضَ), derived from the triconsonantal Semitic root n-f-ḍ (ن-ف-ض) related to shaking (off), dusting (off), and making something shiver. The verb's form is reflexive (اِفْتَعَلَ, iftaʿala), which is referred to in Western sources as "form VIII".

The Dictionary of Modern Written Arabic gives the meaning of intafaḍa (انتفض) as: "to be shaken off, be dusted off; to shake; to shudder, shiver, tremble; to shake off from oneself; to wake up, come to consciousness", as in "انتفض من سباته to shake off one's lethargy," and of its verbal noun انتفاضة intifāḍa (pl. انتفاضات intifāḍāt) as a "shiver, shudder, tremor; awakening (pol.); popular uprising."

In the context of Palestine, the word intifada refers to attempts to "shake off" the Israeli occupation of the West Bank and the Gaza Strip in the First and Second Intifadas. The term was originally chosen to signify "aggressive nonviolent resistance"; in the 1980s, Palestinian students adopted intifada as less confrontational than terms in earlier militant rhetoric since it bore no connotation of violence.

The First Intifada lasted from 1987 to 1993. The Second Intifada started with the October 2000 protests in Israel and continued until 2005. The term third intifada has been variously used to describe 2014 Jerusalem unrest, the 2021 Israel–Palestine crisis, the Gaza war, and other events.

== Usage ==
The slogan "globalize the intifada" has been used as a chant in various anti-Zionist protests, along with variations like "there is only one solution, intifada revolution" and "intifada until victory". Users of the slogan said it was a rallying cry for resistance against what they see as "colonial violence and oppression". The slogan has been frequently used by Jewish Voice for Peace.

In April 2002, a conference titled "Global Intifada: Globalization, US Militarism, and the Struggle for Justice in Palestine" was held at American University in Washington, D.C.. Concerns about racial justice and United States involvement in the Middle East, including the Second Intifada and the Iraqi conflict, were discussed. Antiwar protesters and speakers at a rally after the conference used the phrase "globalize the intifada." During a G8 forum in June 2002, protesters in Calgary used the phrase "G8 says nada. We say global intifada." At the August 2002 World Summit on Sustainable Development in Johannesburg, South Africa, protesters called for imprisoned Palestinian political leader Marwan Barghouti to be released and used the phrase "globalize the intifada against imperialism."

According to the Combat Antisemitism Movement, a 2021 activism campaign based in New York City that included groups such as Within Our Lifetime, Samidoun, and Decolonize This Place, and later Students for Justice in Palestine, Jewish Voice for Peace, Code Pink, the Palestinian Youth Movement, The People's Forum, Al-Awda, and A.N.S.W.E.R. helped popularize the phrase.

=== During the Gaza war ===
During the Gaza war, allegations of antisemitism related to Gaza war protests at universities focused on use of the phrase, along with others, such as "from the river to the sea". In US Congress hearings on campus antisemitism during the Gaza war, Representative Elise Stefanik of the US House Committee on Education and Workforce said calls for intifada were genocidal and antisemitic. Several people have rejected that characterization, including journalist Daoud Kuttab and academics Seth Cantey, Zinaida Miller, and Seth Mandery.

Soon after the October 7 attacks in 2023, pro-Palestinian protesters chanted slogans including "globalize the intifada" near a Cooper Union library, sparking accusations of antisemitism from New York City and national leaders, including New York City mayor Eric Adams. It has been used as a denunciation of Israel's actions during the Gaza war.

In November 2023, the pro-Palestinian group Within Our Lifetime, which supported the 2023 Hamas attack on Israel, posted to Instagram a map of Midtown Manhattan with the headline "Globalize the Intifada". The map contained annotations for locations of Israeli and American companies, along with other points of interest, calling them "location[s] of an office of an enemy of both the Palestinian people and colonized people all over the world", implying they are legitimate targets. Elected officials in New York City and Jewish groups said the post was "a dangerous and abhorrent incitement to violence and poses a direct threat to New York's Jewish communities."

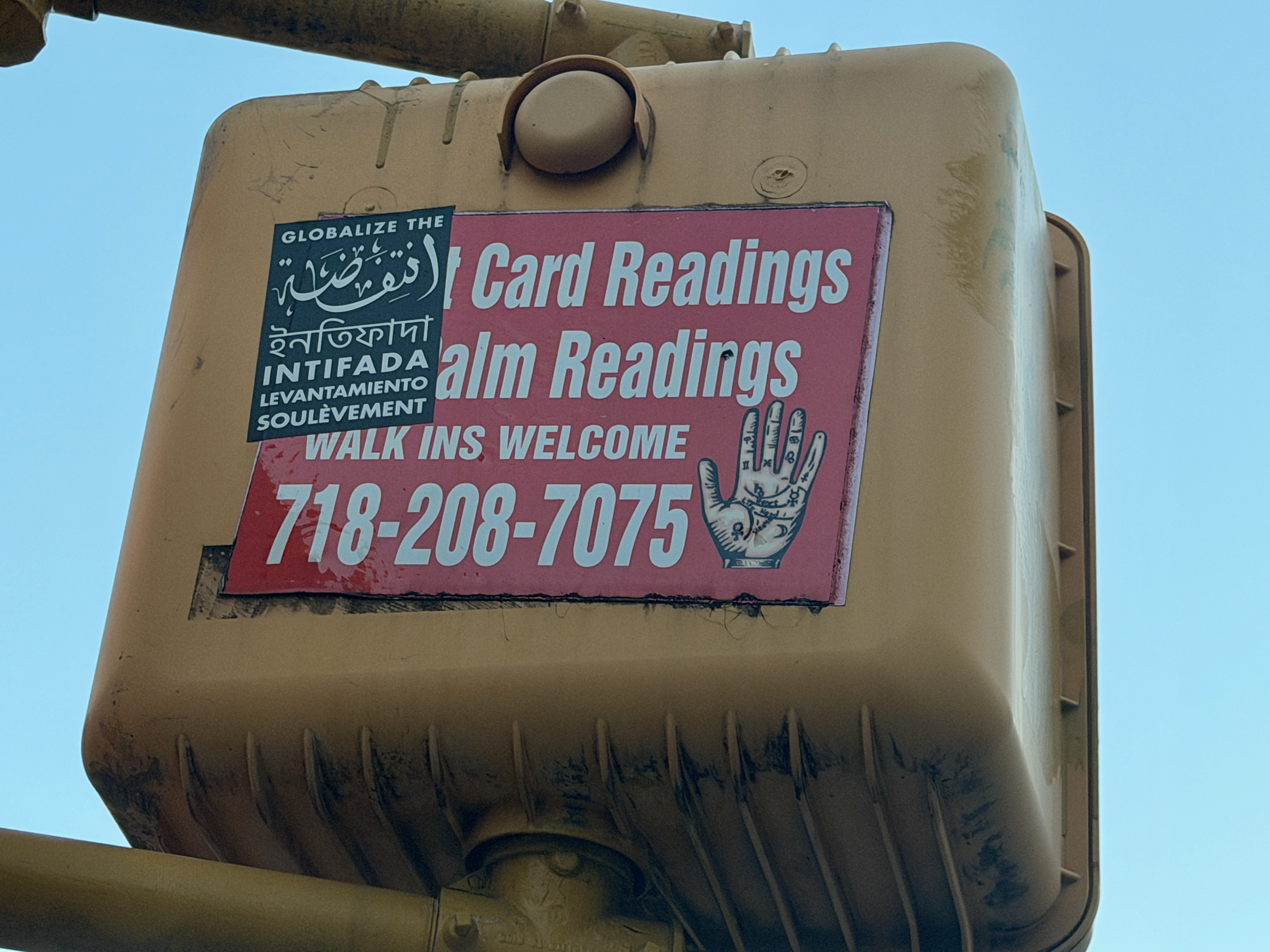
A sticker calling to "Globalize the intifada", New York

In December 2023, London police arrested nine people for displaying banners with the slogan under the Public Order Act 1986. In May 2024, a similar slogan—"Intifada, Revolution!"—was used by pro-Palestinian protesters in central London, prompting an investigation by the Met Police.

In 2025, New York City mayoral candidate Zohran Mamdani was asked about the phrase in an interview; he called it a symbolic call for Palestinian human rights, not for violence or antisemitism. He said the word "intifada" had been used by the United States Holocaust Memorial Museum (USHMM) in Arabic translations referring to Jewish resistance in German-occupied Europe. The USHMM repudiated any invocation of Jewish resistance in World War II to justify the slogan, and Mamdani's statements were condemned by Jewish public figures, including US representative Dan Goldman, American Jewish Committee CEO Ted Deutch, Jonathan Greenblatt of the Anti-Defamation League, former World Jewish Congress vice president Marc Schneier, Rabbi Ammiel Hirsch, and The Atlantic columnist Jonathan Chait. In a subsequent interview, Mamdani said that although he did not use the phrase, he did not want to police language.

After the 2026 Golders Green attack, British Prime Minister Keir Starmer described the phrase as "extreme racism" intended to leave Jews feeling "scared, intimidated, [and] wondering if they belong", and called on Metropolitan Police Commissioner Mark Rowley to criminalise use of the phrase. Starmer's comments were supported by Secretary of State for Transport Heidi Alexander and criticised by Zack Polanski, the leader of the Green Party.

In June 2026, Global Intifada launched the "Genocide Supply Chain" project, an online map identifying factories, ports, vessels and transportation routes allegedly linked to Israel's military supply chain. The campaign called for actions aimed at disrupting arms transfers to Israel and encouraged supporters to participate in "direct action" against targeted manufacturers, including through groups such as Palestine Action. Global Intifada described the project as part of an effort to "disarm the genocidal entity" and argued that the term "intifada" should be understood as a form of resistance rather than terrorism.

==== 2025 Bondi Beach shooting ====
In the aftermath of the 2025 Bondi Beach shooting, in which several people attending a Hanukkah event were killed by people linked to the Islamic State, The New York Times and The Wall Street Journal published op-eds by Bret Stephens and Yoni Bashan connecting the phrase to the attack. The Forward published an op-ed by Jay Michaelson noting that ISIS and Hamas are in fact enemies; ISIS opposes a Palestinian state and has historically focused on armed conflict with Syria rather than with Israel. Michaelson wrote: "ISIS has no interest in the Intifada, globalized or otherwise."

After the shooting, Greater Manchester Police and the London Metropolitan Police announced that they would begin arresting anyone who chanted the phrase at protests, despite longstanding legal advice that it was not a criminal offense. In a joint statement, they said, "violent acts have taken place, the context has changed, words have meaning and consequence", referring to both the Bondi Beach attack and the earlier Manchester synagogue attack. In response, Palestine Solidarity Campaign director Ben Jamal said attempts to criminalise it were "political repression... 'Intifada' means 'shaking off' or 'uprising against injustice'." On December 17, 2025, two people were arrested in London for allegedly shouting "slogans involving calls for intifada", according to the police.

The New South Wales state government proposed legislation to ban public chants and displays of "globalise the intifada", alongside banned extremist symbols. New South Wales Premier Chris Minns called the slogan hate speech that encourages violence. Tougher hate speech laws are to being proposed in Australia and the United Kingdom, including a proposed ban on the slogan. The proposition in the United Kingdom also came shortly after police arrested two people in London on racially aggravated public order charges for allegedly shouting the word or phrase "intifada" at a pro-Palestinian protest.

In February 2026, Queensland proposed to ban "globalize the intifada" and "from the river to the sea". The legislation passed on 5 March 2026. The LNP and the KAP voted for it, while Labor and the Greens voted against it. Anyone found using or displaying either slogan faces penalties of up to two years in jail.

During the 2026 Victorian state election, the Liberals under Jess Wilson vowed to ban the phrase 'globalise the intifada' if elected.

== Reception ==
=== Opposition ===
According to The Sunday Telegraph, the phrase has been associated with incitement of violence against Jewish communities. Both the Anti-Defamation League and American Jewish Committee interpret the slogan as endorsing acts of terrorism and indiscriminate violence against Israelis and Jews worldwide.

Antisemitism scholar David Hirsh and freedom of religion scholar Hilary Miller wrote in 2022 that the slogan "cements a fantasy of Israel as being symbolic of all evil and it raises a fantasy of the Palestinian struggle as a universal symbol of the innocence and courage of all those who suffer." Middle East scholars Jason Olson, Moran Zaga, and David Benger identified the slogan's ubiquity as an example of support for Hamas on American college campuses. David E. Bernstein and David L. Bernstein cited the slogan's currency as a good example of the "striking indifference to the antisemitic ideology that animates Hamas" among progressive groups since the October 7 attacks. The authors write that the slogan "seems to suggest that the widespread terrorist violence of the Second Intifada should be visited upon Jews abroad" and question why participants in the chant who claim to be using "intifada" to mean "struggle" don't chant "globalize the struggle" instead.

In October 2023, Matthew Foldi of The Spectator said that protesters using the slogan were supporters of the October 7 attacks. Some Jewish writers, including David Hazony, Zev Eleff, Ayal Feinberg, and Nora Berman, have interpreted the slogan not just as a challenge to Israel but as a broader declaration of war against Jews, promoting antisemitism and calling for violence instead of peace. After the Jewish-American Paul Kessler died in 2023 in an altercation during dual pro-Palestine and pro-Israel protests, Prime Minister of Israel Yair Lapid criticized the slogan and argued the protests were inherently hateful toward Jews.

=== Defense ===
Others have said that calls for intifada are not inherently violent, arguing that the term "intifada" does not mean genocide and is more correctly translated as "uprising". Daniel Lefkowitz of the University of Virginia hypothesizes that, though Israelis and many Jews consider the term violent, Palestinians associate "Intifada" with the First Intifada, which was largely nonviolent. Some argue the target of "intifada" is the Israeli occupation with the goal of Palestinian independence.

== See also ==
- "Death to Arabs"
- "May Your Village Burn"
- "Khaybar Khaybar ya yahud"
