= Intifada =

Arabic term for uprising or rebellion

Intifada (Arabic: اِنْتِفَاضَة, romanized: intifāḍah) is an Arabic word for a rebellion or uprising, or a resistance movement. It can also be used to refer to a civilian uprising against oppression. In Arabic-language usage, any uprising can be referred to as an intifada, including the 1916 Easter Rising, the 1943 Warsaw Ghetto Uprising, and the 1949 Jeju uprising. When used in English outside of the Arab World, the word has primarily referred to the two Palestinian uprisings against Israeli occupation: the First Intifada (1987–91) and the Second Intifada (2000–05).

In the 20th century, the word intifada has been used to describe various uprisings. In the Iraqi Intifada of 1952, Iraqi parties took to the streets to protest their monarchy. Other later examples include the Western Sahara's Zemla Intifada, the First Sahrawi Intifada, and the Second Sahrawi Intifada. In the context of the Israeli–Palestinian conflict, it refers to an uprising by Palestinian people against Israeli occupation or Israel, involving both violent and nonviolent methods of resistance.

== Lexical information ==
The word intifāḍa (Arabic: اِنْتِفَاضَة) is an Arabic verbal noun (مصدر, maṣdar) of instance (اسم مرة, ism marra) of the verb intafaḍa (اِنْتَفَضَ), derived from the triconsonantal Semitic root n-f-ḍ (ن-ف-ض) related to shaking (off), dusting (off), and making something shiver. The verb's form is reflexive (اِفْتَعَلَ, iftaʿala), which is referred to in Western sources as "form VIII".

The Dictionary of Modern Written Arabic gives the meaning of intafaḍa (انتفض) as: "to be shaken off, be dusted off; to shake; to shudder, shiver, tremble; to shake off from oneself; to wake up, come to consciousness", as in "انتفض من سباته to shake off one's lethargy," and of its verbal noun انتفاضة intifāḍa (pl. انتفاضات intifāḍāt) as a "shiver, shudder, tremor; awakening (pol.); popular uprising."

== Israeli–Palestinian conflict ==
In the context of Palestine, the word intifada refers to attempts to "shake off" the Israeli occupation of the West Bank and the Gaza Strip in the First and Second Intifadas. The term was originally chosen to signify "aggressive nonviolent resistance"; in the 1980s, Palestinian students adopted intifada as less confrontational than terms in earlier militant rhetoric since it bore no connotation of violence.

The First Intifada was characterized by protests, general strikes, economic boycotts, and riots, including the widespread throwing of stones and Molotov cocktails at the Israeli army and its infrastructure in the West Bank and Gaza. The Second Intifada was characterized by a period of heightened violence. The suicide bombings carried out by Palestinian assailants became one of the more prominent features of the Second Intifada and mainly targeted Israeli civilians, contrasting the relatively less violent nature of the First Intifada. The phrase "globalize the intifada" is a slogan used to promote worldwide activism in solidarity with Palestinian resistance. The phrase and those associated with it have caused controversy, particularly concerning their impact and connotations. Critics have said that it encourages widespread violence or terrorism.

== List of events named Intifada ==
In Arabic-language texts, uprisings anywhere can be referred to using the word intifada, including, for example, the 1916 Easter Rising (Arabic: انتفاضة الفصح), the 1943 Warsaw Ghetto Uprising (Arabic: انتفاضة غيتو وارسو), and the 1949 Jeju uprising (Arabic: انتفاضة جيجو). In English, the word may refer to these events, overwhelmingly in the Arabic-speaking world:

- Iraqi Intifada, a series of strikes and riots in Iraq in 1952, aimed against the Hashemite monarchy rule
- October Revolution, a series of strikes, riots, and demonstrations in Sudan, that ended with the dissolution of the Abbud military regime and the beginning of second civilian rule in 1964
- March Intifada, a leftist uprising against the British colonial presence in Bahrain in March 1965
- Zemla Intifada, against Spanish colonial rule in then Spanish Sahara, in June 1970
- In Lebanese internal conflicts:
  - February 6 Intifada (1984), during the Lebanese Civil War
  - Cedar Revolution or "Intifada of Independence", the events in Lebanon after Rafic Hariri's 2005 assassination
- The 1984 Egyptian intifada, (October 1, 1984 - October 2, 1984), a bloody uprising and civil resistance movement
- 1990s uprising in Bahrain, an uprising demanding a return to democratic rule, also known as the "1990s Intifada"
- 1991 Iraqi uprisings, an armed uprising against Saddam Hussein in Iraq, also known as "Iraqi Intifada of 1991"
- In the Western Sahara conflict:
  - First Sahrawi Intifada, protests by Sahrawi activists in the Western Sahara, south of Morocco (1999–2004)
  - Second Sahrawi Intifada or Independence Intifada, demonstrations and riots in Western Sahara, south of Morocco, beginning in May 2005
  - Gdeim Izik protest camp, also referred as Third Sahrawi Intifada or simply Third Intifada
- 2005 French riots referred to be the historian Andrew Hussey as "the French Intifada"
- Arab Spring, a revolutionary wave which began on 18 December 2010 in Tunisia, sometimes referred to as "Intifada":
  - Tunisian Revolution, or Tunisian Intifada
  - Yemeni Revolution, or Yemeni Intifada
  - 2011 Egyptian revolution, or Egyptian Intifada
  - 2011–2013 Sudanese protests, or Sudanese Intifada
- Second Arab Spring, a series of anti-government protests in several Arab countries starting in late 2019, also known as "Arab Spring 2.0":
  - 17 October Revolution, nicknamed the Tax Intifada
  - 2019–2021 Iraqi protests, nicknamed the Iraqi Intifada
- In the Israeli–Palestinian conflict:
  - March 1955 Outburst in the Gaza Strip, an outburst of unrest against the Egyptian occupation over Egyptian plans to relocate Palestinian refugees to the Sinai Peninsula and following the Israeli Operation Black Arrow.
  - March 1982 Palestinian general strike, a significant wave of protests in the occupied Palestinian territories after the Israeli government ordered the dissolution of West Bank city councils elected in 1976, sometimes referred to as the "Intifada of 1982" or the "Spring Uprising," or as part of a "Revolt Against the Civil Administration" that began in late 1981.
  - Various Palestinian student protests in the mid-1980s, such as the April 1985 Bethlehem University protests and the December 1986 Birzeit University protests.
  - First Intifada, a Palestinian uprising against the Israeli occupation lasting from December 1987 to 1993
  - Second Intifada, also called Al-Aqsa Intifada, an uprising against Israeli occupation leading to intensification of Israeli-Palestinian violence, which began in late September 2000 and ended around 2005
  - 2014 Jerusalem unrest, a series of violent acts and attacks in Jerusalem in 2014 sometimes referred to as the "Silent Intifada"
  - 2015–2016 wave of violence in the Israeli–Palestinian conflict – 2015 escalation in Israeli–Palestinian conflict, sometimes referred to as "Al-Quds Intifada", "Jerusalem Intifada" or "Knife Intifada"
  - 2021 Israel–Palestine crisis, also known as the "Unity Intifada"
  - Ongoing Gaza war, referred to by some commentators as the Third Intifada
    - 2024 pro-Palestinian protests on university campuses, nicknamed the "student intifada" by activists and critics

== See also ==
- The Electronic Intifada, an online publication which covers the Israeli–Palestinian conflict from a Palestinian perspective
- International Conference on Supporting Palestine Intifada
- Revolution
- Serhildan, sometimes considered the Kurdish equivalent to "intifada".
