= Kether Torah Synagogue of Sousse =

Synagogue in Sousse, Tunisia

Kether Torah Synagogue
- Hebrew: כתר תורה; Arabic: كنيس كتر التوراة
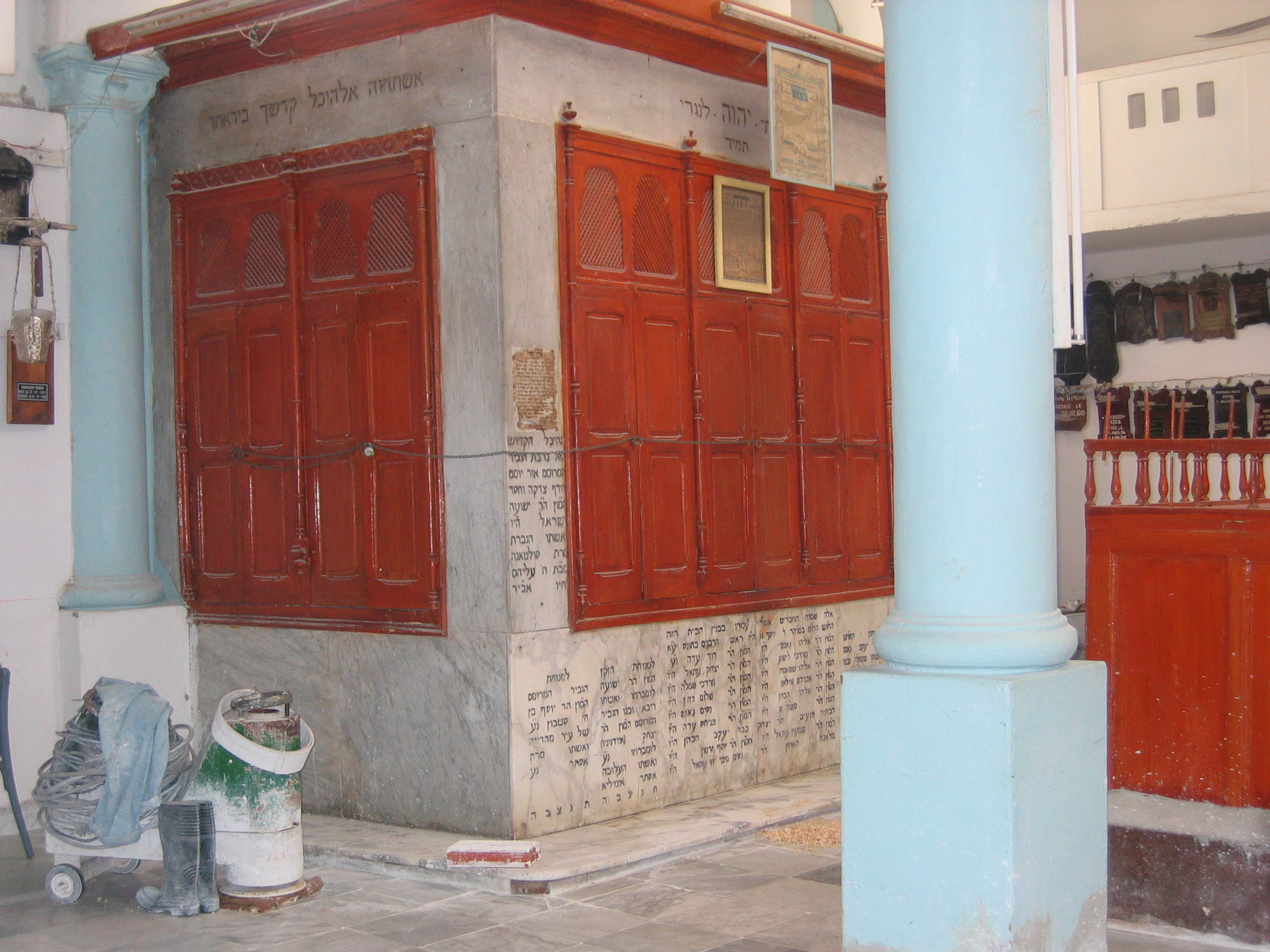
- The Torah ark in the synagogue, in 2006

- Location of the synagogue in Tunisia

Religion
- Affiliation: Judaism
- Ecclesiastical or organizational status: Synagogue
- Status: Active

Location
- Location: Sousse, Sousse Governorate
- Country: Tunisia
- Interactive map of Kether Torah Synagogue
- Coordinates: 35°49′56″N 10°38′23″E

Architecture
- Type: Synagogue architecture
- Founder: Chief Rabbi Yossef Guez
- Completed: 1913

The Keter Torah Synagogue (Hebrew: כתר תורה; Arabic: كنيس كتر التوراة) is a Jewish congregation and synagogue, located in the city of Sousse, in the Sousse Governorate of Tunisia.

== History ==
The city of Sousse has had a large Tunisian Jewish community dating from the Punic period. An 1853 census counted 400 Jewish families in Sousse.

It is in this context that Keter Torah Synagogue was built in 1913 at the initiative of Yossef Guez, Chief Rabbi of Sousse and the first native Tunisian Chief Rabbi. The synagogue is the main synagogue in the city.

In 1946, the Jewish community in Sousse numbered 3,500 but continued to decrease. As of 2006, there were 36 Jews left in Sousse. Sousse once had six synagogues, today only Keter Torah is operational.

On December 6, 2019, the National Heritage Institute of Tunisia announced that the synagogue was placed on the list of heritage sites of the Islamic World Educational, Scientific and Cultural Organization.

== See also ==
- History of the Jews in Tunisia
- List of synagogues in Tunisia
