= Sahrawi Intifada =

Sahrawi Intifada may refer to:

- First Sahrawi Intifada
- Second Sahrawi Intifada
