= June 1967 Tunis riots =

Anti-jewish riots in 1967 Tunis

The June 1967 Tunis Riots or Demonstrations were demonstrations and riots in Tunis on 5 June 1967, in reaction to the Naksa of the same year. The riots lasted 6 hours, in which a crowd of leftist students organized under the Perspectives movement, set fire to the British Library then the American Library, proceeding to Trans World Airlines' offices and the American Embassy. After that, they began to attack Jewish property, vandalizing cars and 100 commercial stores along with a number of Synagogues, including the Grand Synagogue, which they vandalized, desecrated, and burned from the inside and out.

30 protesters also burned the door of the headquarters of the Joint Jewish Distribution Committee (JDC). In June 6th, the President Habib Bourguiba called for the end of the protests and riots, while strongly condemning them in a speech.

The Government then placed military and armored units across various strategic position in the Capital. In addition, four ministers personally visited the Jewish Community Relations Council and issued a formal apology. The next day, 54 rioters were arrested, the National Police Chief and minister of interior were relieved of their duties. In a trial held by the Tunis Military Court, at the end of July, All defendants were convicted and sentenced to prison terms of up to 20 years, the last being Muhammad Ben Jannet's sentence. In the wake of these events, a mass migration of Jews followed in which more than 25,000 people fled the country in the first month.
