= List of synagogues in Tunisia =

The following is a list of synagogues in Tunisia:

== Ariana Governorate ==
Location	Name	Picture	Coordinates or address	Status	References
Aryanah	El Ghriba Synagogue	El Ghriba Synagogue	36.860669°N 10.191007°E	In activity	
Aryanah	Menahem Zeitoun Synagogue	Menahem Zeitoun Synagogue	36.858463°N 10.189999°E	Disused and converted back to a house	
Aryanah	Samuel Zeitoun Synagogue	Samuel Zeitoun Synagogue	36.860567°N 10.191281°E	Abandoned	
Aryanah	Nino Benattar Synagogue	Nino Benattar Synagogue	36.859790°N 10.188942°E	Disused and converted back to a house	
Aryanah	Qaid Abraham Synagogue	Qaid Abraham Synagogue	36.859832°N 10.190670°E	Disused and converted back to a house	
Aryanah	Rabbi Haim Khemani Synagogue	Rabbi Haim Khemani Synagogue	36.858597°N 10.190269°E	Disused and converted back to a house	
Aryanah	Rabbi Hai Cohen Synagogue	Rabbi Hai Cohen Synagogue	36.858157°N 10.192315°E	Disused and converted back to a house	
Aryanah	Bet Abraham Soria Synagogue	Bet Abraham Soria Synagogue	36.857220°N 10.188945°E	Destroyed (1980s)	
Aryanah	Kouttab Kisraoui Synagogue	Kouttab Kisraoui Synagogue	36.858330°N 10.190356°E	Disused and converted back to a house	
Aryanah	Salomon Lumbroso Synagogue	Salomon Lumbroso Synagogue	36.858961°N 10.189763°E	Disused and converted back to a house	
Aryanah	Roubine Azoulay Synagogue	Roubine Azoulay Synagogue	Nouvelle Aryanah	Disused and converted back to a house	

== Béja Governorate ==
Location	Name	Picture	Coordinates	Status	References
Béja	Rabbi Fraji Synagogue	Rabbi Fraji Synagogue	36.724681°N 9.184531°E	Disused	
Béja	Great Synagogue	Great Synagogue	36.724307°N 9.183301°E	Disused and converted back to a room for Les Scouts Tunisiens	
Béja	Fitoussi Synagogue	Fitoussi Synagogue	36.726719°N 9.181444°E	Disused	
Béja	Tubiana Synagogue	Tubiana Synagogue	36.723388°N 9.186894°E	Disused	
Béja	Boubli and Levy Synagogue	Boubli and Levy Synagogue	36.724720°N 9.187081°E	Disused	
Béja	Fella Sarfati Synagogue	Fella Sarfati Synagogue	36.723494°N 9.184788°E	Disused	
Majaz al Bab	Synagogue	Majaz al Bab	36.649253°N 9.608301°E	Disused and converted back to a kouttab then disused	
Testour	Synagogue	Testour		In ruins	

== Ben Arous Governorate ==
Location	Name	Picture	Coordinates or address	Status	References
Hammam-Lif	Bit Sefer Ibri Synagogue	Bit Sefer Ibri Synagogue	rue du Théâtre	Disused and converted back to a children's library	

== Bizerte Governorate ==
Location	Name	Picture	Coordinates or address	Status	References
Bizerte	R'baa Synagogue	R'baa Synagogue	place de France	Destroyed (1942)	
Bizerte	Great Synagogue	Great Synagogue	37.273834°N 9.874289°E	Disused and converted back to a regional library	
Ghar el-Melh	Synagogue	Ghar el-Melh		Disused	
Mateur	Synagogue	Mateur		Abandoned	
Menzel Bourguiba	Synagogue	Menzel Bourguiba	rue Marceau	Disused	
Ras Jebel	Synagogue	Ras Jebel		Destroyed	

== Gabès Governorate ==
Location	Name	Picture	Coordinates	Status	References
Gabès	Menzel Synagogue	Menzel Synagogue	33.881459°N 10.087692°E	Destroyed (1980s)	
Gabès	Bab El Bhar Synagogue	Bab El Bhar Synagogue		In activity	
Gabès	Djara Synagogue	Djara Synagogue	33.888961°N 10.097111°E	Disused and converted back to a warehouse	
Gabès	Small Djara Synagogue	Small Djara Synagogue		Destroyed	
Gabès	Habroun Synagogue	Habroun Synagogue		Destroyed	
Gabès	Train Station Synagogue	Train Station Synagogue		Destroyed	
El Hamma	Synagogue	El Hamma		Disused and converted back to a deposit	
El Hamma	El Hamma synagogue	El Hamma	33.8819°N 9.8008°E	Next to the tomb of Yossef El Maarabi, heavily damaged during pro-Palestine riots in 2023	
Matmata	Synagogue	Matmata		Abandoned	
Tamezret	Synagogue	Tamezret		In activity	

== Gafsa Governorate ==
Location	Name	Picture	Coordinates	Status	References
Gafsa	Shim’oni Synagogue of Gafsa	Gafsa	34.419055°N 8.788085°E	Abandoned	
El Guettar	Synagogue	El Guettar		Destroyed	
Métlaoui	Synagogue	Métlaoui		Disused and converted back to a house then partially collapsed	

== Jendouba Governorate ==
Location	Name	Picture	Coordinates or address	Status	References
Jendouba	Synagogue	Jendouba	rue Thiers (Ali-Belhouane)	Disused and converted back to a women's training center	
Bou Salem	Synagogue	Bou Salem	36.609390°N 8.969054°E	Destroyed	

== Kairouan Governorate ==
Location	Name	Picture	Coordinates	Status	References
Kairouan	Synagogue	Kairouan	35.678454°N 10.099872°E	Disused and converted back to a madrasa then partially in ruins	
Hajeb El Ayoun	Synagogue	Hajeb El Ayoun		Destroyed	

== Kasserine Governorate ==
Location	Name	Picture	Coordinates	Status	References
Kasserine	Synagogue	Kasserine		Disused	
Sbeitla	Synagogue	Sbeitla		Disused	
Thala	Synagogue	Thala		Destroyed	

== Kebili Governorate ==
Location	Name	Picture	Coordinates	Status	References
Kebili	Synagogue	Kebili	33.704032°N 8.972123°E	Disused and converted back to shops and workshops	
Douz	Synagogue	Douz	33.455105°N 9.025719°E	Destroyed	

== Kef Governorate ==
Location	Name	Picture	Coordinates or address	Status	References
El Kef	El Ghriba Synagogue	El Ghriba Synagogue	36.180590°N 8.714106°E	Disused and converted back to a museum (1994)	
Dahmani	Synagogue	Dahmani	avenue de la République	Assigned to a charity	

== Mahdia Governorate ==
Location	Name	Picture	Coordinates	Status	References
Mahdia	Synagogue	Mahdia	35.504755°N 11.068877°E	Abandoned	

== Manouba Governorate ==
Location	Name	Picture	Coordinates or address	Status	References
Tebourba	Synagogue	Tebourba	rue de la Ceinture	Destroyed (1942)	

== Medenine Governorate ==
Location	Name	Picture	Coordinates	Status	References
Er Riadh (Hara Sghira)	El Ghriba Synagogue	El Ghriba Synagogue	33.813889°N 10.858889°E	In activity	
Er Riadh (Hara Sghira)	Slat Trabelsiya	Slat Trabelsiya	33.821839°N 10.854362°E	In activity	
Er Riadh (Hara Sghira)	Yeshiva Dighet	Yeshiva Dighet	33.821719°N 10.853021°E	Abandoned	
Er Riadh (Hara Sghira)	Yeshiva hCohanim, Yeshiva Rabbi Abraham	Yeshiva hCohanim	33.820982°N 10.854531°E	In activity	
Er Riadh (Hara Sghira)	Yeshiva Jdida	Yeshiva Jdida	33.820164°N 10.853622°E	Abandoned	
Er Riadh (Hara Sghira)	Slat Amram	Slat Amram	33.821432°N 10.854520°E	Partially in ruins	
Er Riadh (Hara Sghira)	Yeshiva Klifa Cohen	Yeshiva Klifa Cohen	33.821093°N 10.854464°E	Abandoned	
Er Riadh (Hara Sghira)	Alyat Rabbi Zakine Mazouz	Alyat Rabbi Zakine Mazouz	33.820876°N 10.854590°E	In activity	
Houmt El Souk (Hara Kebira)	Sla Kebira	Sla Kebira	33.866540°N 10.869180°E	In activity	
Houmt El Souk (Hara Kebira)	Slat haCohanim	Slat haCohanim	33.863818°N 10.868268°E	In activity	
Houmt El Souk (Hara Kebira)	Slat Eliezer	Slat Eliezer	33.864690°N 10.869758°E	In activity	
Houmt El Souk (Hara Kebira)	Slat Rabbi Bezalel	Slat Rabbi Bezalel	33.863558°N 10.866058°E	In activity	
Houmt El Souk (Hara Kebira)	Slat Rabbi Brahem	Slat Rabbi Brahem	33.867587°N 10.868161°E	In activity	
Houmt El Souk (Hara Kebira)	Slat Rabbi Chalom	Slat Rabbi Chalom	33.865454°N 10.867670°E	In activity	
Houmt El Souk (Hara Kebira)	Slat Hizkiya Perez	Slat Hizkiya Perez	33.865414°N 10.869116°E	In activity	
Houmt El Souk (Hara Kebira)	Slat Rabbi Pinhas	Slat Rabbi Pinhas	33.865886°N 10.868429°E	In activity	
Houmt El Souk (Hara Kebira)	Slat Trabelsiya	Slat Trabelsiya	33.865819°N 10.868252°E	Rebuilt (2006)	
Houmt El Souk (Hara Kebira)	Alyat Ishaq Houri	Alyat Ishaq Houri	33.864854°N 10.866425°E	In activity	
Houmt El Souk (Hara Kebira)	Alyat Rabbi Sassi	Alyat Rabbi Sassi	33.866753°N 10.868146°E	In activity	
Houmt El Souk (Hara Kebira)	Maatouk Haddad Synagogue	Maatouk Haddad Synagogue	33.867383°N 10.868489°E	Abandoned	
Houmt El Souk (Hara Kebira)	Menahem Houri Synagogue	Menahem Houri Synagogue	33.865138°N 10.869648°E	Partially in ruins	
Houmt El Souk (Hara Kebira)	Sabban Synagogue	Sabban Synagogue	33.864882°N 10.868637°E	In activity	
Houmt El Souk	Pariente Synagogue	Pariente Synagogue		In activity	
Medenine	Synagogue	Medenine		Destroyed (1990s)	
Ben Gardane	Synagogue	Ben Gardane	33.138044°N 11.217352°E	Destroyed	
Metameur	Synagogue	Metameur		In ruins	
Zarzis	Synagogue	Zarzis		Rebuilt (1999)	
Mouansa	Synagogue	Mouansa		Abandoned	

== Monastir Governorate ==
Location	Name	Picture	Coordinates or address	Status	References
Monastir	Synagogue	Monastir	35.774231°N 10.828993°E	Destroyed (1980s)	
Moknine	Synagogue	Moknine	souk des Bijoutiers	Abandoned	

== Nabeul Governorate ==
Location	Name	Picture	Coordinates	Status	References
Nabeul	Great Synagogue	Great Synagogue	36.457231°N 10.735681°E	In activity	
Nabeul	Slat Karila and Mamou	Slat Karila and Mamou	36.456167°N 10.736946°E	In activity	
Nabeul	Yeshiva Gaston Karila	Yeshiva Gaston Karila	36.456801°N 10.736802°E	Abandoned	
Nabeul	Talmud Thora Synagogue	Talmud Thora Synagogue	36.457625°N 10.735625°E	Disused	
Nabeul	Rabbi Hai Guez Synagogue	Rabbi Hai Guez Synagogue	36.454997°N 10.734942°E	Disused	
Nabeul	Fraim Haddad Synagogue	Fraim Haddad Synagogue	36.456039°N 10.736452°E	Disused	
Nabeul	Barouma Synagogue, Guez Synagogue	Barouma Synagogue	36.456002°N 10.737069°E	Disused	
Nabeul	Yeshiva Mouchi Haddad	Yeshiva Mouchi Haddad	36.457110°N 10.735776°E	Disused	
Nabeul	Beth Yacoub Mamou Synagogue	Beth Yacoub Mamou Synagogue	36.453218°N 10.733293°E	Disused	
Menzel Bouzelfa	Synagogue	Menzel Bouzelfa		Disused and converted back to a rehearsal room for the municipal brass band	
Soliman	Synagogue	Soliman		Disused and partially destroyed	

== Sfax Governorate ==
Location	Name	Picture	Coordinates or address	Status	References
Sfax	Great Synagogue	Great Synagogue	rue de la Synagogue	Destroyed (1943)	
Sfax	Mazouz Jda Synagogue, Abraham Mazouz Synagogue	Mazouz Jda Synagogue	34.735035°N 10.762310°E	Disused and converted back to a shop	
Sfax	Masliah Synagogue	Masliah Synagogue	rue de Jérusalem	Destroyed (1943)	
Sfax	Sdika Synagogue	Sdika Synagogue	rue Jules-Ferry	Destroyed (1943)	
Sfax	Hebrat Ha-Zohar Synagogue	Hebrat Ha-Zohar Synagogue	rue d'Alger	Destroyed (1943)	
Sfax	Nahmias Synagogue	Nahmias Synagogue	34.734456°N 10.762134°E	Destroyed (1943)	
Sfax	Boukhors Synagogue	Boukhors Synagogue	rue Barthélemy-Saint-Hilaire	Destroyed (1943)	
Sfax	Zerah Synagogue	Zerah Synagogue	rue Flatters	Destroyed (1943)	
Sfax	Didi Synagogue	Didi Synagogue	rue du Colonel Ramond (Tahar-Sfar)	Destroyed (1943)	
Sfax	Great Synagogue Beth-El	Great Synagogue Beth-El	34.732278°N 10.758126°E	Restored	
Sfax	Edmond Azria Synagogue	Edmond Azria Synagogue	34.730297°N 10.765046°E	Abandoned	
Sfax	Chouchan and Khamous Azria Synagogue	Chouchan and Khamous Azria Synagogue	34.728882°N 10.759821°E	Destroyed	
Sfax	Guez Synagogue	Guez Synagogue	34.734050°N 10.765115°E	Disused	
Sfax	AIU Synagogue	AIU Synagogue	34.733038°N 10.766156°E	Disused	
Sfax	Old Gendarmerie Synagogue	Old Gendarmerie Synagogue	34.742153°N 10.763521°E	Disused	
Sfax	Ankri Debbir Synagogue	Ankri Debbir Synagogue		Disused	
Sfax	Elie Bouhnik Synagogue	Elie Bouhnik Synagogue		Disused	
Sfax	Nataf Synagogue	Nataf Synagogue	34.732198°N 10.752975°E	Disused	
Sfax (Picville)	Zeitoun Synagogue	Zeitoun Synagogue	34.734993°N 10.753179°E	Disused	
Sfax (Moulinville)	Azria Matouk Synagogue	Azria Matouk Synagogue		Disused	

== Sidi Bouzid Governorate ==
No synagogue is located in the Sidi Bouzid Governorate.

== Siliana Governorate ==
No synagogue is located in the Siliana Governorate.

== Sousse Governorate ==
Location	Name	Picture	Coordinates or address	Status	References
Sousse	Synagogue	Dar Essais	rue Dar Essais	Destroyed	
Sousse	Great Synagogue	Great Synagogue	35.825912°N 10.639832°E	Abandoned	
Sousse	Sicile Street Synagogue	Sicile Street Synagogue	35.827303°N 10.638068°E	Disused	
Sousse	Keter Torah Synagogue	Keter Torah Synagogue	avenue Krantz	In activity	
Sousse	Hai Moatti Synagogue	Hai Moatti Synagogue	place Forgemol	Disused	
Sousse	Slat Bibi	Slat Bibi	rue du Transvaal (Tebourba)	Disused	
Enfida	Synagogue	Enfida		Disused	

== Tataouine Governorate ==
Location	Name	Picture	Coordinates	Status	References
Tataouine	Synagogue	Tataouine	32.928227°N 10.449495°E	Abandoned	
Tataouine	Slat Guedicha	Slat Guedicha	32.927906°N 10.449923°E	Destroyed	

== Tozeur Governorate ==
Location	Name	Picture	Coordinates	Status	References
Tozeur	Ouled El Hadef Synagogue	Tozeur		Disused and converted back to a cafe	
Nefta	Synagogue	Nefta		Disused and converted back to a house	

== Tunis Governorate ==
Location	Name	Picture	Coordinates or address	Status	References
Tunis	Great Synagogue	Great Synagogue	36.81038°N 10.180065°E	In activity	
Tunis	El Hara Synagogue	El Hara Synagogue	36.802484°N 10.170046°E	Destroyed (1961)	
Tunis	Bet Chalom Synagogue, George Abitbol Synagogue	Bet Chalom Synagogue	36.810251°N 10.180118°E	In activity	
Tunis	Bet Yaacov Synagogue, Cohen Synagogue	Bet Yaacov Synagogue	36.801368°N 10.179805°E	Disused	
Tunis	El Hobra Synagogue	El Hobra Synagogue	36.802020°N 10.170443°E	Destroyed	
Tunis	Knesset Israël Synagogue, Slat Guedid	Knesset Israël Synagogue	36.801302°N 10.171238°E	Disused and converted back to a training center	
Tunis	Bet Sion Synagogue	Bet Sion Synagogue	2, impasse de l'Essieu	Destroyed	
Tunis	Simah Sarfati Synagogue	Simah Sarfati Synagogue	36.802505°N 10.169862°E	Destroyed	
Tunis	Rabbi Ichoua Bessis Synagogue	Rabbi Ichoua Bessis Synagogue	6, impasse du Pilier	Destroyed	
Tunis	Nathan Synagogue	Nathan Synagogue	36.801816°N 10.174019°E	Disused	
Tunis	Rabbi Haim Synagogue	Rabbi Haim Synagogue	36.802092°N 10.171173°E	Destroyed	
Tunis	Rabbi Hillel Synagogue	Rabbi Hillel Synagogue	36.800126°N 10.173751°E	Disused	
Tunis	Qaid Nessim Synagogue	Qaid Nessim Synagogue	36.803722°N 10.172298°E	Disused	
Tunis	Or Thora Synagogue, New Hobra Synagogue	Or Thora	36.801463°N 10.169655°E	Disused	
Tunis	Djemaa El Grana Synagogue	Djemaa El Grana Synagogue	rue Sidi El Morjani	Disused	
Tunis	Zramma Synagogue	Zramma Synagogue	4, impasse Samama	Destroyed	
Tunis	Simah Guez Synagogue	Simah Guez Synagogue	5, impasse Djerad	Disused	
Tunis	Chief Rabbi Haim Bellaiche Synagogue	Chief Rabbi Haim Bellaiche Synagogue	4, rue d'Isly (Cologne)	In activity	
Tunis	Rabbi Isaac Taieb Synagogue	Rabbi Isaac Taieb Synagogue	36.801972°N 10.169127°E	Destroyed	
Tunis	Rabbi Mouchi Darmon Synagogue	Rabbi Mouchi Darmon Synagogue	22, rue El Meslekh	Destroyed	
Tunis	Chalom Bessis Synagogue	Chalom Bessis Synagogue	20, rue Sidi Mefredj	Disused	
Tunis	Zirah Ishaq Synagogue	Zirah Ishaq Synagogue	impasse des Jumeaux	Destroyed	
Tunis	El Ghriba Synagogue	El Ghriba Synagogue	3, rue de la Hafsia	Disused	
Tunis	Nahmias Synagogue	Nahmias Synagogue	13, rue El Khemira	Disused	
Tunis	Vais Synagogue	Vais Synagogue	impasse du Médecin	Disused	
Tunis	Rabbi Baroukh Fitoussi Synagogue	Rabbi Baroukh Fitoussi Synagogue	16, impasse des Musiciens	Destroyed	
Tunis	Rabbi Ouziel Synagogue	Rabbi Ouziel Synagogue	36.801863°N 10.171387°E	Destroyed	
Tunis	Hakham Sapira Synagogue	Hakham Sapira Synagogue	36.802105°N 10.171437°E	Destroyed	
Tunis	Rabbi Mouchi Darmon Synagogue	Rabbi Mouchi Darmon Synagogue	36.802155°N 10.171564°E	Destroyed	
Tunis	Brami Synagogue	Brami Synagogue	7, rue Achour	Disused	
Tunis	Zdoud Synagogue	Zdoud Synagogue	107, souk El Hout	Destroyed	
Tunis	Jacob Chemla Synagogue	Jacob Chemla Synagogue	quartier Saint-Henri	Disused	
Tunis	Abraham Sitbon Synagogue	Abraham Sitbon Synagogue	10, rue El Moulla	Destroyed	
Tunis	Qaid Eliahou Samama Synagogue	Qaid Eliahou Samama Synagogue	29, rue Sidi Khalf	Disused	
Tunis	Fellah Cattan Synagogue	Fellah Cattan Synagogue	23, rue Sidi Mardoum	Disused	
Tunis	Qaid Abraham Menahim Synagogue, Mouchi Cohen Synagogue	Qaid Abraham Menahim Synagogue	39, rue de la Verrerie	Disused and converted back to a shop	
Tunis	Bismuth Harhar Synagogue	Bismuth Harhar Synagogue	24, rue Sidi Bou Hadid	Disused	
Tunis	Rabbi Eliahou Naamane Synagogue	Rabbi Eliahou Naamane Synagogue	36.803532°N 10.171580°E	Disused	
Tunis	Abraham Arous Synagogue	Abraham Arous Synagogue	7, rue Sidi Sifiane	Disused	
Tunis	Qaid Abraham Samama Synagogue	Qaid Abraham Samama Synagogue	5, rue Er-Raccah	Disused	
Tunis	Khamous Baroukh Synagogue	Khamous Baroukh Synagogue	56, rue des Protestants	Disused	
Tunis	Elfassi Synagogue	Elfassi Synagogue	36.800476°N 10.173376°E	In ruins	
Tunis	Rabbi Youda Nizard Synagogue	Rabbi Youda Nizard Synagogue	36.800504°N 10.173813°E	Disused	
Tunis	Zarhi Synagogue	Zarhi Synagogue	24, rue El Karamed	Disused	
Tunis	Freiha Synagogue	Freiha Synagogue	4, rue El Moulla	Destroyed	
Tunis	Youssef Madar Synagogue	Youssef Madar Synagogue	14, impasse El Ouarglia	Disused	
Tunis	Rahmine Haddad Synagogue	Rahmine Haddad Synagogue	14, rue Sidi Bou Krissan	Disused	
Tunis	Sassi Smila Synagogue	Sassi Smila Synagogue	7bis, rue Sidi Bou Krissan	Disused	
Tunis	Karoubi Synagogue	Karoubi Synagogue	7, place Bab Souika	Disused	
Tunis	Saül Boublil Synagogue	Saül Boublil Synagogue	20, rue Bab Souika	Disused	
Tunis	Abraham Nini Guez Synagogue	Abraham Nini Guez Synagogue	1, rue de Sparte	Disused	
Tunis	Rabbi Micaël Saada Synagogue	Rabbi Micaël Saada Synagogue	24, rue Tronja	Disused	
Tunis	Messaoud Haouzi Synagogue	Messaoud Haouzi Synagogue	7, place du 7-Mai 1943 (Monnaie)	Disused	
Tunis	Elie Bessis Synagogue	Elie Bessis Synagogue	8, rue de Souk-Ahras	Disused	
Tunis	Hai Bessis Synagogue	Hai Bessis Synagogue	41, avenue Jules-Ferry (Habib-Bourguiba)	Destroyed	
Tunis	Salomon Hayat Synagogue	Salomon Hayat Synagogue	36.801922°N 10.181190°E	Disused	
Tunis	David Sitbon Berkaiak Synagogue	David Sitbon Berkaiak Synagogue	31, rue Bab Souika	Disused	
Tunis	Edouard Fellous Synagogue	Edouard Fellous Synagogue	36.816694°N 10.177563°E	Disused	
Tunis	Hai Hayat Synagogue	Hai Hayat Synagogue	46, rue de Corse	Disused	
Tunis	Youssef Parienti Synagogue	Youssef Parienti Synagogue	31, rue de l'Alfa (Ali-Belhouane)	Disused	
Tunis	Samuel Bonan Synagogue	Samuel Bonan Synagogue	9, rue de l'Alfa (Ali-Belhouane)	Disused (1997)	
Tunis	Rabbi Haim Perez Synagogue	Rabbi Haim Perez Synagogue	9, rue de Pise (Medjez el-Bab)	In activity	
Tunis	Isaac Adda Synagogue	Isaac Adda Synagogue	4, place Sidi El Bahri	Disused	
Tunis	Rabbi Youssef Fellous Synagogue	Rabbi Youssef Fellous Synagogue	1, rue Sidi Sifiane	Disused	
Tunis	Rabbi Eliahou Cohen Synagogue	Rabbi Eliahou Cohen Synagogue	8, rue Sidi Sifiane	Disused	
Tunis	Yacoub Lumbroso Synagogue	Yacoub Lumbroso Synagogue	24, rue Sidi Sifiane	Disused	
Tunis	Albert Freoua Synagogue	Albert Freoua Synagogue	20, rue Chanzy (Djebel Bargou)	Disused	
Tunis	Youssef Belaish Synagogue	Youssef Belaish Synagogue	42, rue Damrémont	Disused	
Tunis	Chief Rabbi Eliahou Borgel Synagogue	Chief Rabbi Eliahou Borgel Synagogue	36.805835°N 10.178208°E	Disused	
Tunis	Abraham Gozlan Synagogue	Abraham Gozlan Synagogue	36.805610°N 10.175934°E	Disused	
Tunis	Chief Rabbi Israël Zeitoun Synagogue	Chief Rabbi Israël Zeitoun Synagogue	36.806055°N 10.178456°E	Disused	
Tunis	Yochevet Sion Synagogue	Yochevet Sion Synagogue	7, rue Bab El Khadra	Disused	
Tunis	Bet Aron Synagogue	Bet Aron Synagogue	63, rue Kléber	Disused	
Tunis	Youda Messika Synagogue	Youda Messika Synagogue	2, rue de Menton	Disused	
Tunis	Mouchi Koskas Synagogue	Mouchi Koskas Synagogue	36.808389°N 10.180379°E	Disused	
Tunis	Sadani Baranes Synagogue	Sadani Baranes Synagogue	11, rue El Maharek	Disused	
Tunis	Spinosa Synagogue	Spinosa Synagogue	8, impasse El Hanachi	Disused	
Tunis	Bab El Khadra Resetting Synagogue	Bab El Khadra Resetting Synagogue	rue El Tazarki	Disused	
Tunis	Tripolitans Synagogue	Tripolitans Synagogue	4, rue de Chikli	Disused	
Tunis	Choua Brahmi Synagogue	Choua Brahmi Synagogue	71, rue des Glacieres	Disused	
Tunis	Mouchi Jakubovicz Synagogue	Mouchi Jakubovicz Synagogue	5, rue d'Isly (Cologne)	Disused	
Tunis	Bismuth and Haik Synagogue	Bismuth and Haik Synagogue	36.811138°N 10.179249°E	Abandoned	
Tunis	Bou Hadma Synagogue	Bou Hadma Synagogue	13, rue Bab El Khadra	In activity	
Tunis	Bouta Uzan Synagogue	Bouta Uzan Synagogue	25, rue Lafayette (Égypte)	Disused	
Tunis	Belaisch and Gozlan Synagogue	Belaisch and Gozlan Synagogue	13, avenue Garros (Hédi-Chaker)	Disused	
Tunis	Beau-Site Synagogue, Isaac Behar Synagogue	Beau-Site Synagogue	rue d'Ispahan	Destroyed	
La Goulette	Sion Sarfati Synagogue	Sion Sarfati Synagogue	36.815171°N 10.302678°E	Disused	
La Goulette	Haim Benattar Synagogue	Haim Benattar Synagogue	36.816097°N 10.304821°E	Disused	
La Goulette	Rabbi Rahmine Chemila Synagogue	Rabbi Rahmine Chemila Synagogue	36.816427°N 10.305814°E	Disused	
La Goulette	Belaisch and Gozlan Synagogue	Belaisch and Gozlan Synagogue	rue de Carthage	Disused	
La Goulette	Sadani Uzan Synagogue	Sadani Uzan Synagogue	rue de Carthage	Disused	
La Goulette	Rabbi Haim Uzan Synagogue	Rabbi Haim Uzan Synagogue	36.819914°N 10.307563°E	Disused	
La Goulette	El Bratal Synagogue	El Bratal Synagogue	36.817999°N 10.306779°E	Destroyed (2009)	
La Goulette	Rabbi Mardochée Sitruk Synagogue	Rabbi Mardochée Sitruk Synagogue	36.819279°N 10.307632°E	Disused	
La Goulette	Rabbi Mardochée Didi Synagogue	Rabbi Mardochée Didi Synagogue	36.818291°N 10.304679°E	Disused	
La Goulette	Bet Mordechai Synagogue	Bessis Synagogue	36.821430°N 10.308915°E	In activity	
La Goulette	Salomon Lasry Synagogue	Salomon Lasry Synagogue	rue de Carthage	Disused	
La Goulette	Community House Synagogue	Community House Synagogue	36.820846°N 10.309252°E	Disused	
Le Kram	Bet Cohanim Synagogue	Bet Cohanim Synagogue	36.832692°N 10.315381°E	Destroyed	
La Marsa	Keren Ichoua Synagogue	Keren Ichoua Synagogue	36.884111°N 10.333323°E	In activity	

== Zaghouan Governorate ==
No synagogue is located in the Zaghouan Governorate.

== See also ==
- History of the Jews in Tunisia
- List of synagogues in Algeria
- List of synagogues in Morocco

== Bibliography ==
- Bismuth-Jarrassé, Colette; Jarrassé, Dominique (2010). Synagogues de Tunisie : monuments d'une histoire et d'une identité (in French). Le Kremlin-Bicêtre: Esthétiques du divers. ISBN 978-2-9533041-2-1.
