= Joseph Bismuth =

Tunisian politician and businessman (1926–2019)

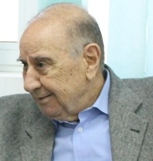

Member of the Chamber of Advisors
- Incumbent
- Assumed office July 3, 2005

Personal details
- Born: 4 November 1926 La Goulette, French protectorate of Tunisia
- Died: 1 October 2019 (aged 92) Tunis, Tunisia
- Occupation: Businessman

Joseph Roger Bismuth (4 November 1926 – 1 October 2019) was a Tunisian businessman and senator. He was elected into the newly formed upper chamber, the Chamber of Advisors, in July 2005 and was the only Jewish elected legislator in the Arab world. He has been called the "most famous Jew in the country."

== Early life ==
Bismuth was born in La Goulette (a neighborhood of the Port of Tunis) in the French protectorate of Tunisia on November 4, 1926. He left school at the age of 14 in 1940 in order to work in construction. He would have to walk up to 10 km to get to work. During World War II, the Germans occupied Tunisia. From November 1942 to May 1943, Bismuth was conscripted by the Nazis to build bunkers near his hometown.

== Business career ==
Before his career in politics, Bismuth was a businessman. Bismuth began his career in the construction sector in 1940. After World War II ended, Bismuth worked for the French colonial government building soldier barracks. He was an active member of the Tunisian independence movement.

Bismuth eventually founded the Groupe Bismuth, a holding company which included businesses involved in distribution, merchandise, chemical production, industry and electrical equipment. At his peak, Bismuth managed 12 industrial companies based in Tunisia.

Bismuth was also a member of many Tunisian and international business organizations like the Franco-Tunisian Chamber of Commerce and Industry and the Institut Arabe des Chefs d’Entreprises (transl. Arab Institute of Business Leaders). In 2002, Bismuth joined the International Council of Jewish Parliamentarians. For many years, he was a leader in the Tunisian Confederation of Industry, Trade and Handicrafts.

== Political career ==
As vice president of the Tunisian Confederation of Industry, Trade and Handicrafts, Bismuth was elected to the Chamber of Advisors on July 3, 2005, becoming the only Jewish parliamentarian in the Arab world at the time. Upon his election, he told the Associated Press: "I am very emotional and proud to have been elected to this parliamentary institution, an illustration of the openness and tolerance that characterize Tunisia". He notably mentioned that he had received congratulations from leaders of the American Jewish Committee as well as the President of the European Jewish Congress.

The 2011 Tunisian revolution caused some new perspectives on Tunisian Jews, although Bismuth maintained that they were not in any danger. In the new government, Bismuth opposed the proposition stating that there be a quota on the number of Jews and Christians that can serve in the government. In March 2012, Bismuth condemned individuals in Tunis who called for the murder of Jews, telling the press he was "no longer optimistic and I can see a clear vision, at the moment, of a future in this country".

Bismuth had close ties to previous Tunisian presidents Beji Caid Essebsi and Zine el-Abidine Ben Ali, serving as an informal advisor for both of them. In 2014, he endorsed Essebsi's presidential run, along with René Trabelsi, another prominent member of the Tunisian-Jewish community. During the United States diplomatic cables leak, he was called a Ben Ali loyalist. However, he has also criticized Ben Ali for political corruptio following the 2010 Tunisian revolution.

== Activism ==
Bismuth had a long history of activism both for Tunisia and its Jewish community. As senator, he said his " remarks were always aimed at improving things for the whole population." As a young adult, Bismuth participated in the Tunisian independence movements against French colonial rule.

He was also active in promoting the safety and vitality of Tunisia's Jewish community. Bismuth was president of the Jewish Community of Tunisia (French: Communauté Juive de Tunisie). As president, the group built the Center for Aging People in La Goulette, Bismuth's hometown, which provides kosher food and services to the jewish community. For a short period of time, the Center was supported by the American Jewish Joint Distribution Committee.

In particular, Bismuth supported the community of Tunisian Jews who choose to stay in Tunisia. He stated he had no intentions to emmigrate, stating "This is the place where my ancestors and I were born." About other Tunisian-Jews, Bismuth said "I really don’t like Silvan Shalom. He is very stupid." in response to Shalom's proposal for Tunisian Jews to immigrate to Israel.

== Personal life ==
Bismuth attended Beit Mordechai Synagogue in La Goulette. He was married twice and had six children. Three children (Jacqueline, Michelle and Philippe) were from his first marriage with his wife Yvette, while three (Stephen, Jean, and Peter) were from his second marriage to Aase, a Danish national. Aase converted to Conservative Judaism.

Bismuth died on October 1, 2019 in Tunis, Tunisia at the age of 92.

== Articles ==
- Jewish Legislators Build International Network
- Jewish legislators network, learn, visit ailing Sharon
- The International Council of Jewish Parliamentarians (ICJP)
