= Mouansa Synagogue =

Former synagogue in Mouansa, Tunisia

- Arabic: معبد موانسة
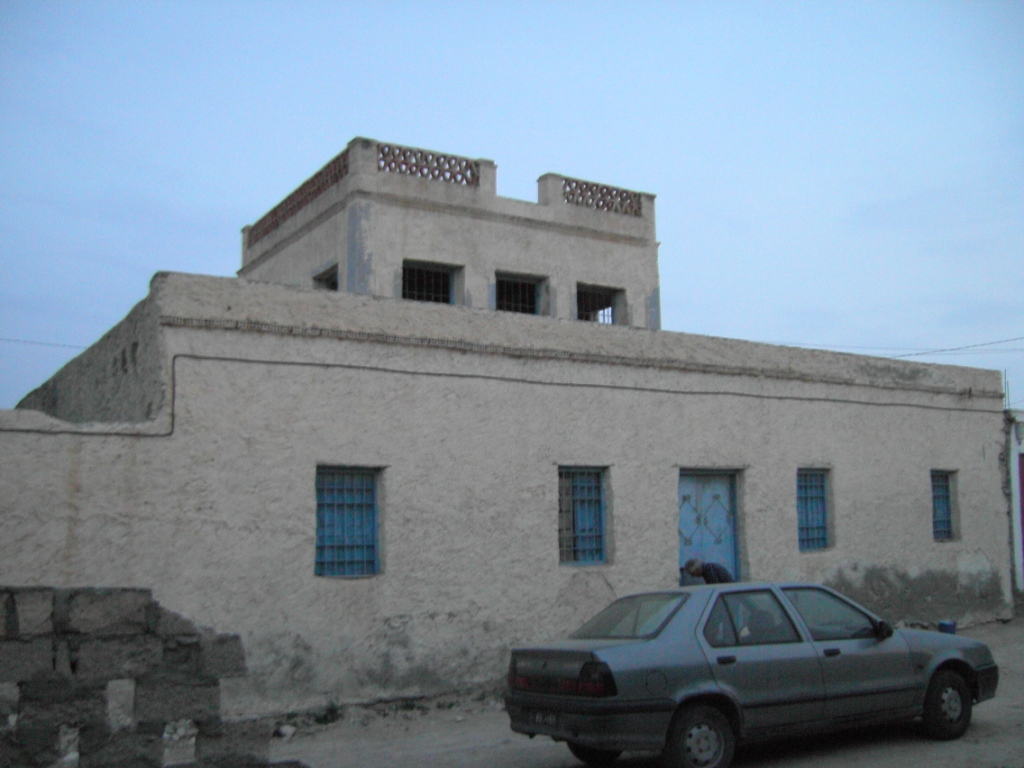
- The former synagogue, in 2007

Religion
- Affiliation: Orthodox Judaism (former)
- Rite: Nusach Sefard
- Ecclesiastical or organizational status: Synagogue ( –1970s)
- Status: Abandoned

Location
- Location: west of Zarzis
- Country: Tunisia

The Mouansa Synagogue (Arabic: معبد موانسة) is a former Orthodox Jewish congregation and synagogue, located in the village of Mouansa, located just west of Zarzis, Tunisia, in North Africa.

The synagogue, together with the nearby Jewish cemetery, is all that remains of the Jewish community of the village after the Jewish exodus from Tunisia that accelerated after attacks in 1967.

== See also ==
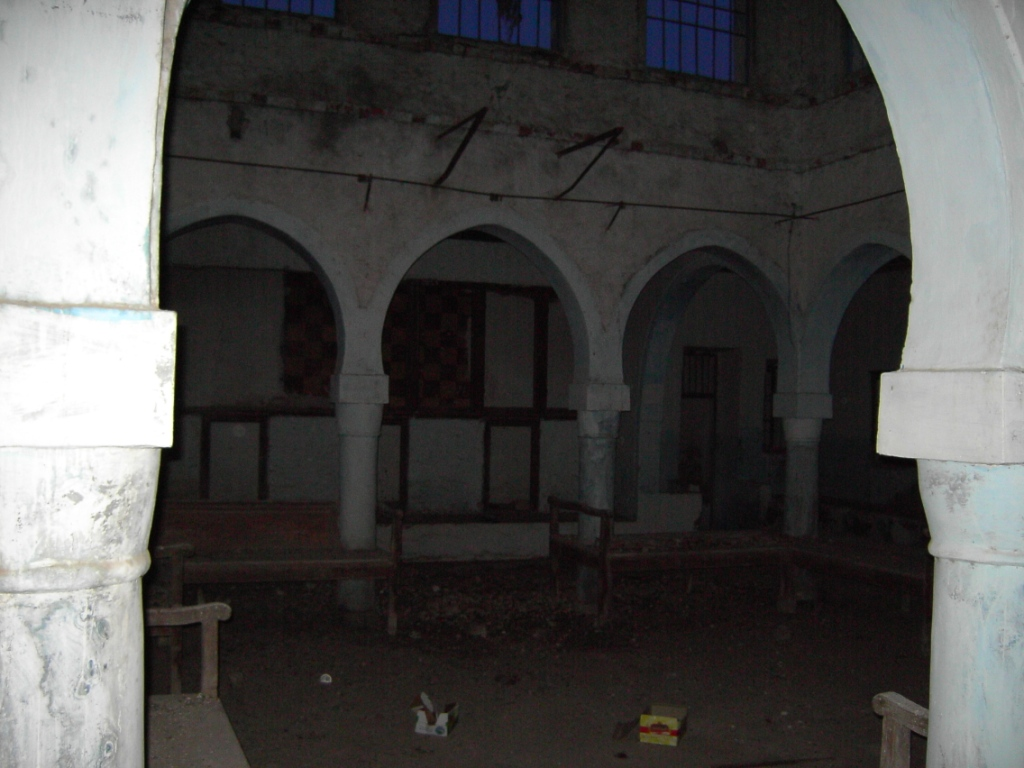
The dilapidated interior of the former synagogue

- History of the Jews in Tunisia
- List of synagogues in Tunisia
