= El Hamma Synagogue =

Former synagogue in El Hamma, Tunisia

- Location of the destroyed synagogue in Tunisia

Religion
- Affiliation: Judaism (former)
- Ecclesiastical or organizational status: Synagogue (????–2023)
- Status: Destroyed

Location
- Location: El Hamma, Gabès Governorate
- Country: Tunisia
- Interactive map of El Hamma Synagogue
- Coordinates: 33°52′55″N 9°48′04″E

Architecture
- Type: Synagogue architecture
- Destroyed: October 17, 2023

The El Hamma Synagogue, also known as the Al Hamma Synagogue, was an historic non-functioning former Jewish congregation and synagogue, that was located in El Hamma, in the Gabès Governorate of Tunisia. It was heavily damaged by rioters during pro-Palestine protests surrounding the Gaza war.

== History ==
By 2023, the synagogue was no longer an active house of worship, as there were no longer Jews in El Hamma. As the burial site of 16th century Kabbalist rabbi Yosef Ma'arawi, the synagogue was historically a Jewish pilgrimage site.

The synagogue was the target of antisemitic attacks. In March 2011 during the Arab Spring, the synagogue's entry gate, guard house, a Torah scroll were damaged in an arson attack.

During pro-Palestine protests on 17 October 2023 during the Gaza war, hundreds of rioters set fire to the synagogue building, hammered away the building's walls, and planted Palestinian flags at the site. Police did not intervene. The Jewish Telegraphic Agency described the 2023 riot as depriving "Al Hammah of a key vestige of its Jewish past." The 2023 attack came five months after a mass shooting at the El Ghriba Synagogue, also in Tunisia. Activist Rafram Chaddad told Al-Monitor that "In every event that Palestinians get killed, the Jews of Tunisia get attacked in turn. It’s a ritual." Tunisian President Kais Saied called an emergency session of Parliament after the attack, but did not condemn the attack on the synagogue.

== See also ==
- History of the Jews in Djerba
- List of synagogues in Tunisia
