= Third intifada =

Intifada (Arabic: انتفاضة, romanized: intifāḍah) is an Arabic word for a rebellion or uprising, or a resistance movement.

Third intifada or Third Intifada may refer to:

- In the Israeli–Palestinian conflict:
  - Gaza war
  - 2021 Israel–Palestine crisis
  - 2014 Jerusalem unrest
- Gdeim Izik protest camp, also known as the Third Sahrawi Intifada

== See also ==
- Intifada § List of events named Intifada
