= Grand Synagogue of Tunis =

Synagogue in Tunis, Tunisia

- French: Grand synagogue de Tunis
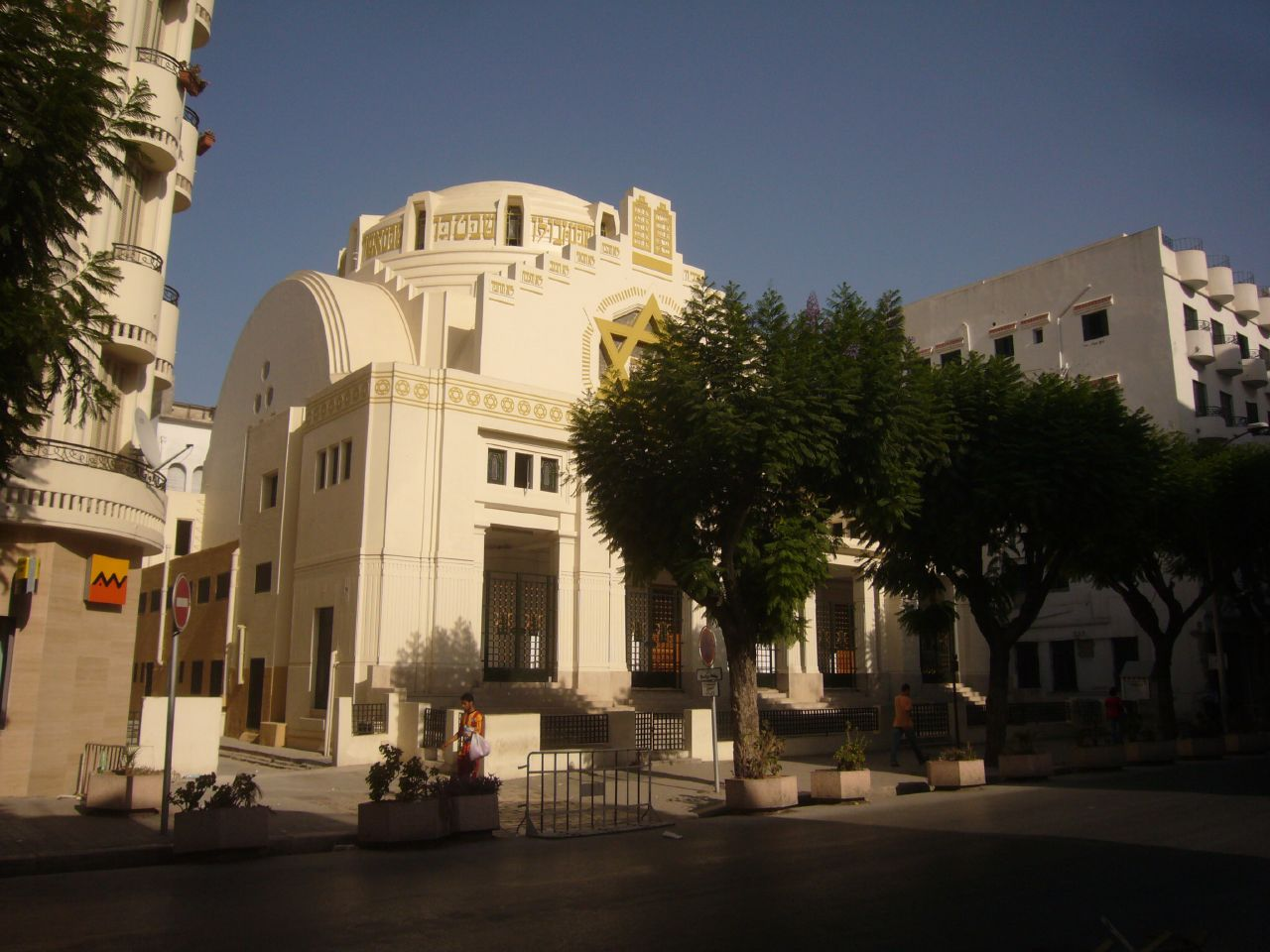
- The synagogue, in 2008

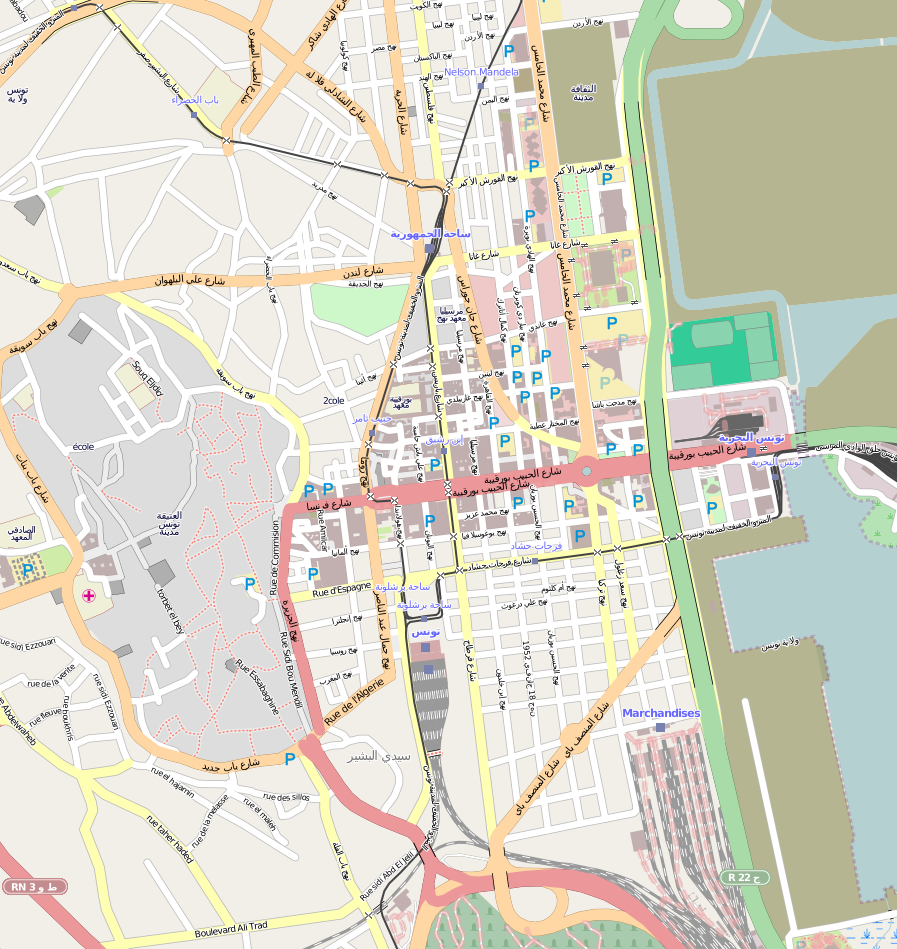
- Location of the synagogue in Tunis

Religion
- Affiliation: Judaism
- Ecclesiastical or organisational status: Synagogue
- Status: Active

Location
- Location: Avenue de la Liberté, Tunis
- Country: Tunisia
- Coordinates: 36°48′37″N 10°10′48″E

Architecture
- Architect: Victor Valensi
- Type: Synagogue architecture
- Style: Art Deco
- Founder: Giacomo Di Castelnuovo
- Groundbreaking: 1933
- Completed: 1937; 1990 (restoration)
- Capacity: 400 people

The Grand Synagogue of Tunis (French: Grand synagogue de Tunis), also called the Great Synagogue of Tunis or the Temple of Osiris, is a Jewish congregation and synagogue, located on Avenue de la Liberté, in Tunis, Tunisia.

== History ==
The idea for a synagogue was originally requested by the 19th-century Italian Jewish statesman Giacomo Di Castelnuovo, and finally established in 1937 by French architect Victor Valensi, who chose to design it in the Art Deco style. The synagogue was shut down by Nazi Germany during the German occupation of Tunisia, but resumed operations after the country was liberated by Allied forces.

=== Post World War II ===
In 1967, anti-Jewish rioters motivated by the then-ongoing Six-Day War trashed and looted the synagogue, burning it to the ground and destroying the sacred Torah scrolls, resulting in the abandonment of the building. In the 1990s Zine El Abidine Ben Ali funded the building's restoration.

In 2011 Islamic extremist rioters attacked the synagogue and damaged it, chanting Khaybar, Khaybar during the riot.

Tariq Ahmad, Baron Ahmad of Wimbledon, visited the Grand Synagogue during a two-day visit to Tunisia in early June 2022. On 24 June 2022, a person ran towards the synagogue and stabbed two officers, lightly injuring them. Authorities identified the stabbing as a terrorist attack and said its perpetrator had previously been arrested on terrorism and violence-related charges.

== Gallery ==
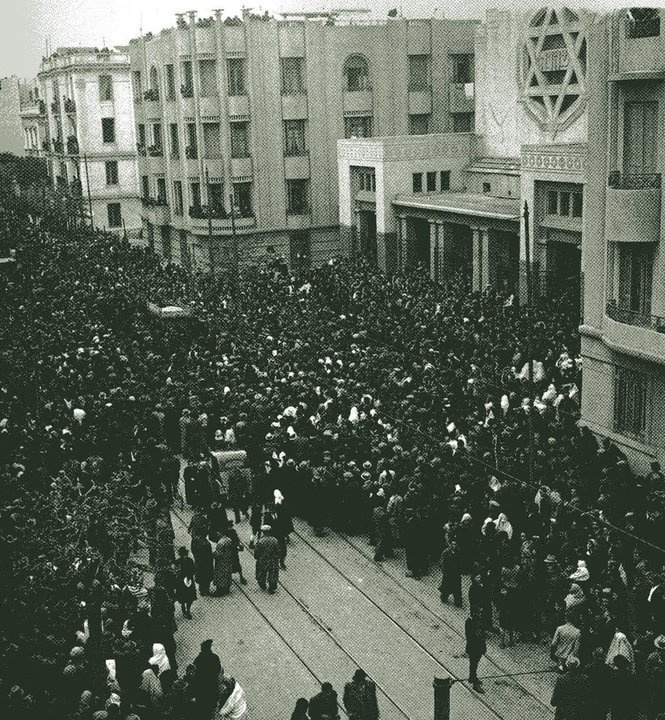
Funeral of Rabbi Yacob Boccara in 1941.

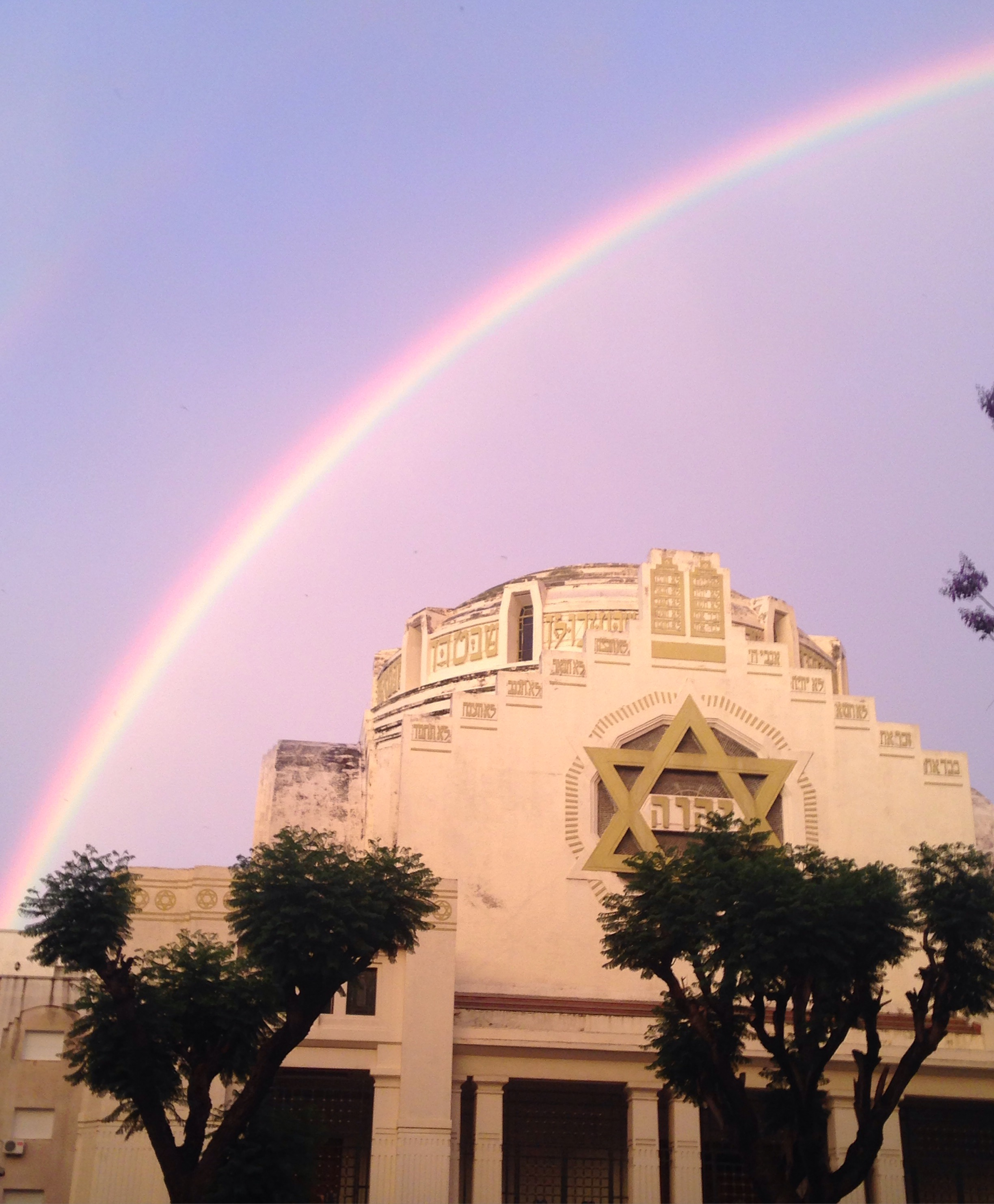
Rainbow arcing over the Grand Synagogue in 2016.

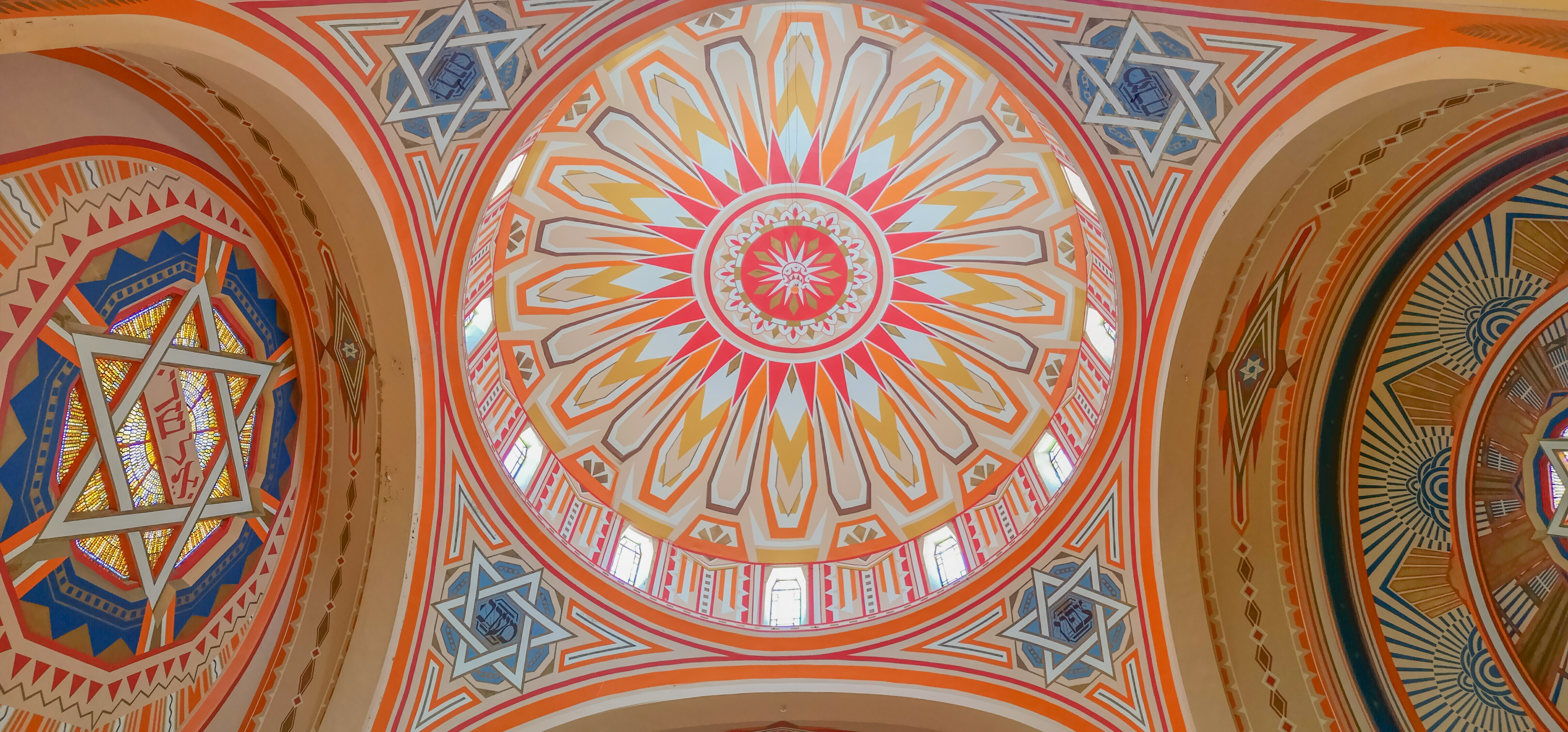
Dome

== See also ==
- History of the Jews in Tunisia
- List of synagogues in Tunisia
