= Synagogue Keren Yéchoua =

Orthodox synagogue in La Marsa, Tunis, Tunisia

Synagogue Keren Yeshoua
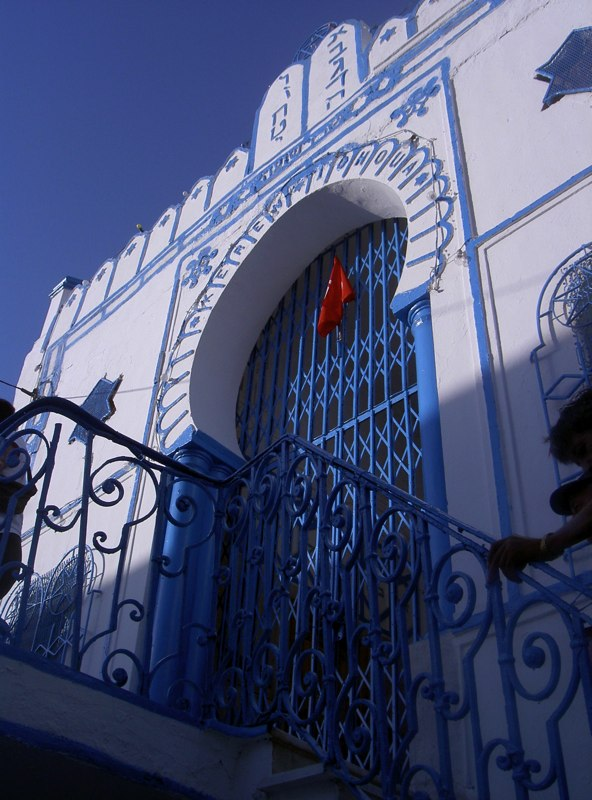
- Façade of the synagogue, in 2007

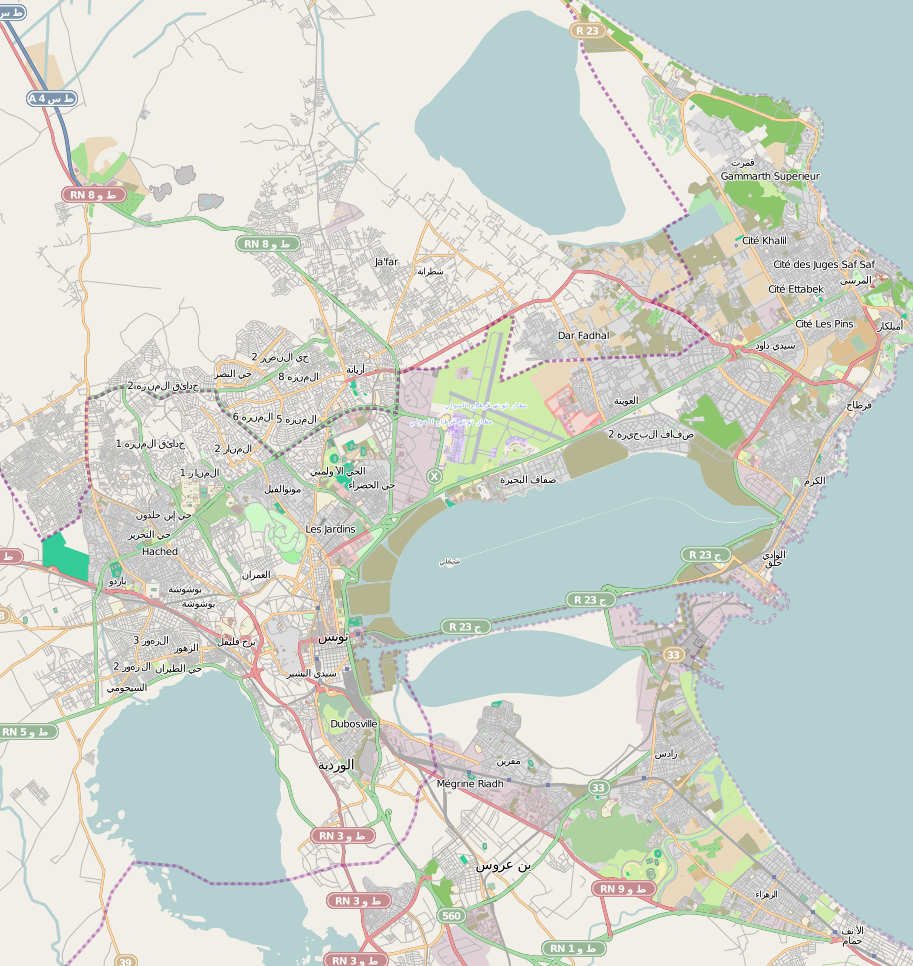
- Location of the synagogue in Greater Tunis

Religion
- Affiliation: Orthodox Judaism
- Rite: Maghrebi
- Ecclesiastical or organizational status: Synagogue
- Status: Active

Location
- Location: La Marsa, Tunis
- Country: Tunisia
- Interactive map of Synagogue Keren Yeshoua
- Coordinates: 36°53′03″N 10°20′00″E

Architecture
- Type: Synagogue architecture
- Style: Moorish Revival
- Funded by: Yéchoua Sauveur Kisraoui (land)
- Groundbreaking: 1925
- Completed: 1927

The Synagogue Keren Yeshoua, often written as Keren Yéchoua or Keren Ichoua, is a Jewish congregation and synagogue, located in La Marsa, a suburb of Tunis, Tunisia.

== History ==
The synagogue was founded in 1923 and was named Keren Yéchoua after local philanthropist Yéchoua Sauveur Kisraoui who provided the land for the synagogue building. The keystone was placed in 1925 and the synagogue itself was opened and consecrated in 1927. This synagogue, over the course of its history, has seen generations of Tunisian Jews pray, celebrate life cycle events, and welcomed numerous rabbis as visitors and scholars. It is one of the pieces of Tunisian Jewish heritage and is highly respected by the local Muslim community.

The synagogue serves as the center of the Jewish community in La Marsa, and it also has a Jewish elementary school on site. Since the beginning of the 1980s, due to a decrease in the number of congregants, the synagogue closed its doors except for during the summer (July–August), when Jewish tourists visit the area on vacation. Isaac Kalfon is the current officiant who is responsible for the building.

Nicknamed by some congregants as the "Synagogue of Miracles", the synagogue survived several close encounters with destruction. During the Second World War and the occupation of Tunisia, the synagogue was saved from bombardment by American planes. The seat of the local Kommandant was only ten meters (33 ft) from the synagogue in the Hotel Zephyr, and legend has it that the pilot saw the Star of David from the dome of the synagogue and adjusted his trajectory to avoid it. The bombs fell on the Saf-Saf district about 200 meters (660 ft) from the synagogue. After liberating Tunisia, Jewish Allied soldiers came to pray in the synagogue, photos of which remain preserved in the synagogue's archives.

In 1994, the synagogue was damaged by severe winter weather, leading to the collapse of the dome and structural danger to the rest of the building. Those responsible for the synagogue, in collaboration with congregants, saved the building despite calls from the municipality and the larger Tunisian Jewish community to demolish the building. Thanks to financial contributions by a private committee of congregants, the synagogue was restore to its original state.

On the evening of April 11–12, 2002, the synagogue was ransacked, with holy books ripped and burned and other ritual objects damaged. Racist graffiti in Arabic, portraits of Yasser Arafat and Palestinian flags were draped on the walls. The vandalism happened shortly after the Ghriba synagogue bombing. The Tunisian Government apologized and said it would do everything in its power to restore the state of the building. Since the incident, a police guards the synagogue 24 hours a day.

In 2007, the synagogue building celebrated its 80th anniversary and on this occasion, an association was founded in Sarcelles (in France), to safeguard the building and its use as a place of worship.

== Architecture ==
The synagogue is known for its distinguishing Moorish Revival style. The synagogue appears in the Tunisian film Un été à La Goulette by Férid Boughedir. It is painted in blue and white, traditional colors for Judaism as well as for the village of Sidi Bou Said, which overlooks La Marsa. Until 1994, the synagogue had a cupola which collapsed following severe weather. Large stone tablets inscribed with the Ten Commandments overlook the building. The interior of the synagogue uses a unique circular heikhal (Torah ark) and a wooden Teba (Bimah) carved by famous local Cabinet makers. It is said that the Bey of Tunis, a patron of the arts who had a vacation home in La Marsa, helped assist in the making of the Teba. A blessing for the Bey of Tunis and later the President of Tunisia were carved in marble in Hebrew, Arabic, and French. Finally, a veranda in the rear of the building offers a magnificent panorama of La Marsa's shoreline.

== Rabbi Kalfon ==
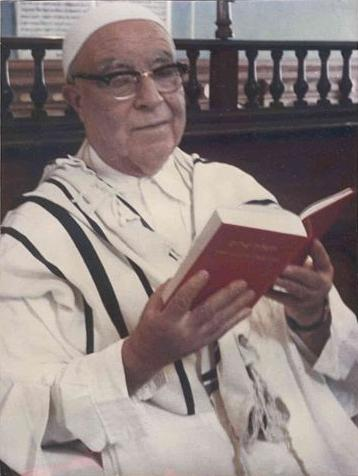
Rabbin Yomtob Kalfon

Rabbi Yomtob Kalfon (1899–1977) served as the spiritual leader, officiating minister and administrator of the synagogue from 1927 until his death. The Rabbi, a member of the Jewish community of Tunis was known for his Erudition as well as his engagement with the larger community, especially on social action issues (as the head of several local charities). The rabbi continued the work of Chief Rabbi Haïm Bellaïche at Yechiba Hebrat Atalmud, located in Bellaiche's former home at 4 Rue de Cologne in Tunis. A synagogue still exists there to this day.

Rabbi Kalfon twice refused to take the role of Chief Rabbi of Tunisia, letting older Rabbis take the role ahead of himself. Nevertheless, he took the role in 1940 at age 41. The Rabbi was also known for his good relations with other religious communities, especially the Muslim community, and shared friendships with several Muslim leaders, including imams. Due to these diverse roles, Rabbi Kalfon became an emblematic figure in Tunisian Judaism and in the life of the La Marsa synagogue. Since his death in 1977, his son Isaac has maintained the synagogue's building and officiates there every summer.

== Gallery ==
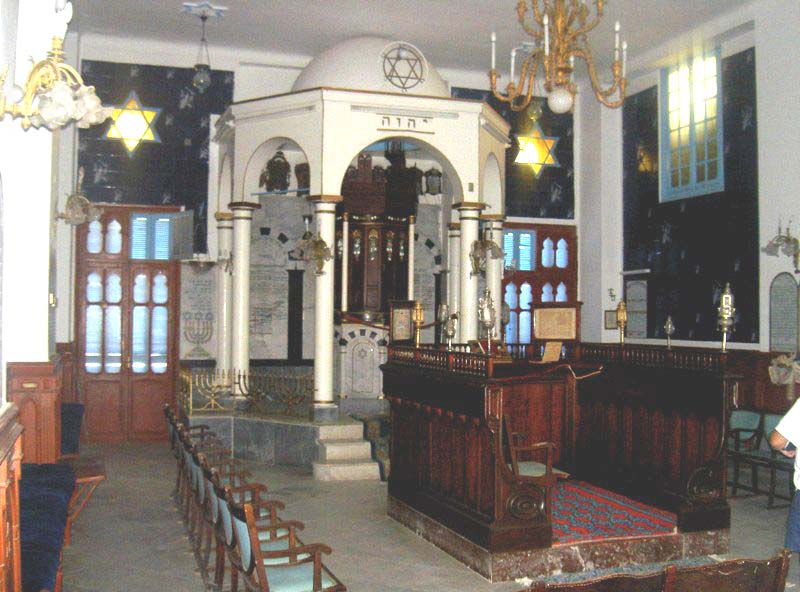
Interior of the Synagogue

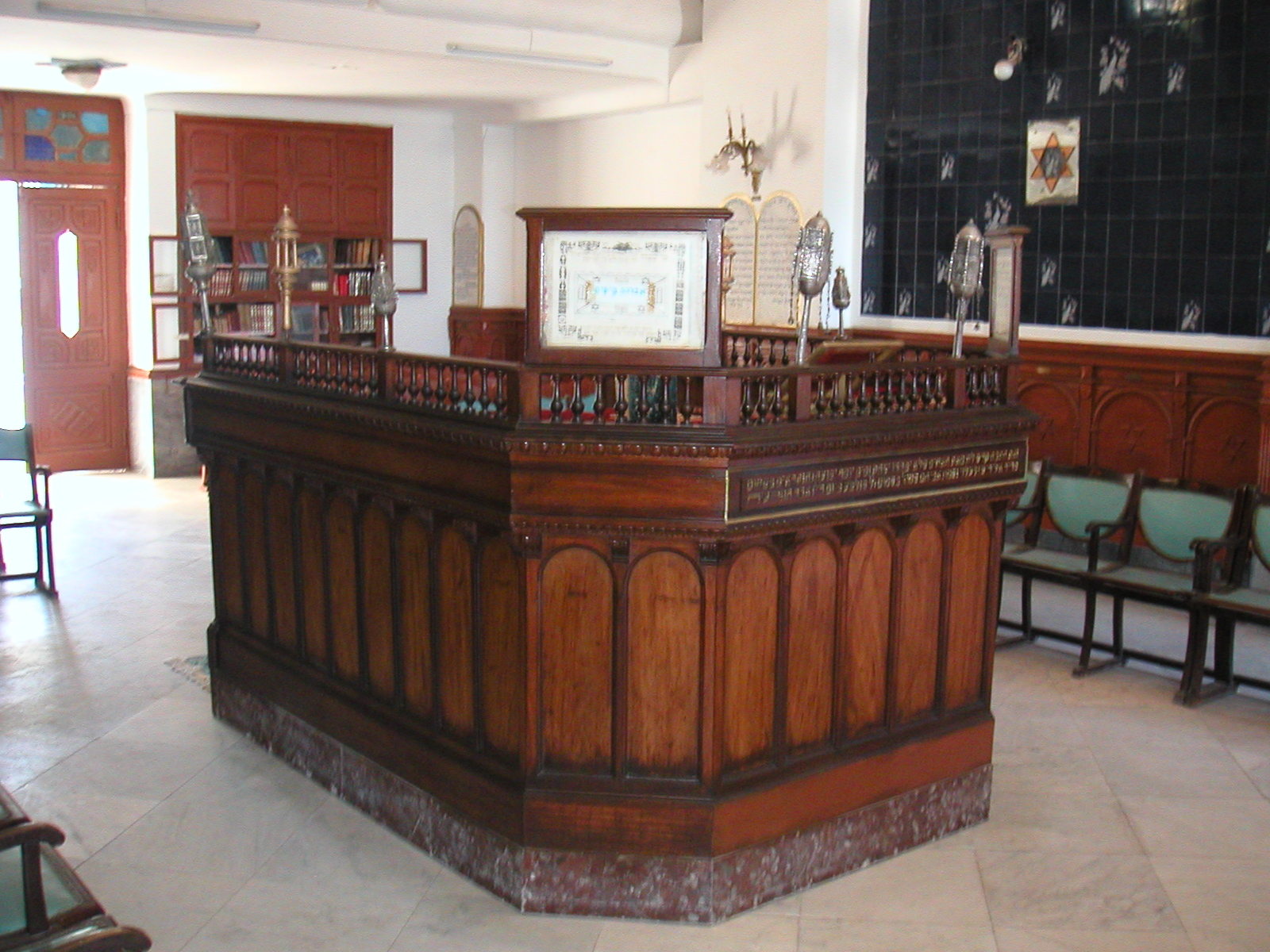
The Teba (Bimah)

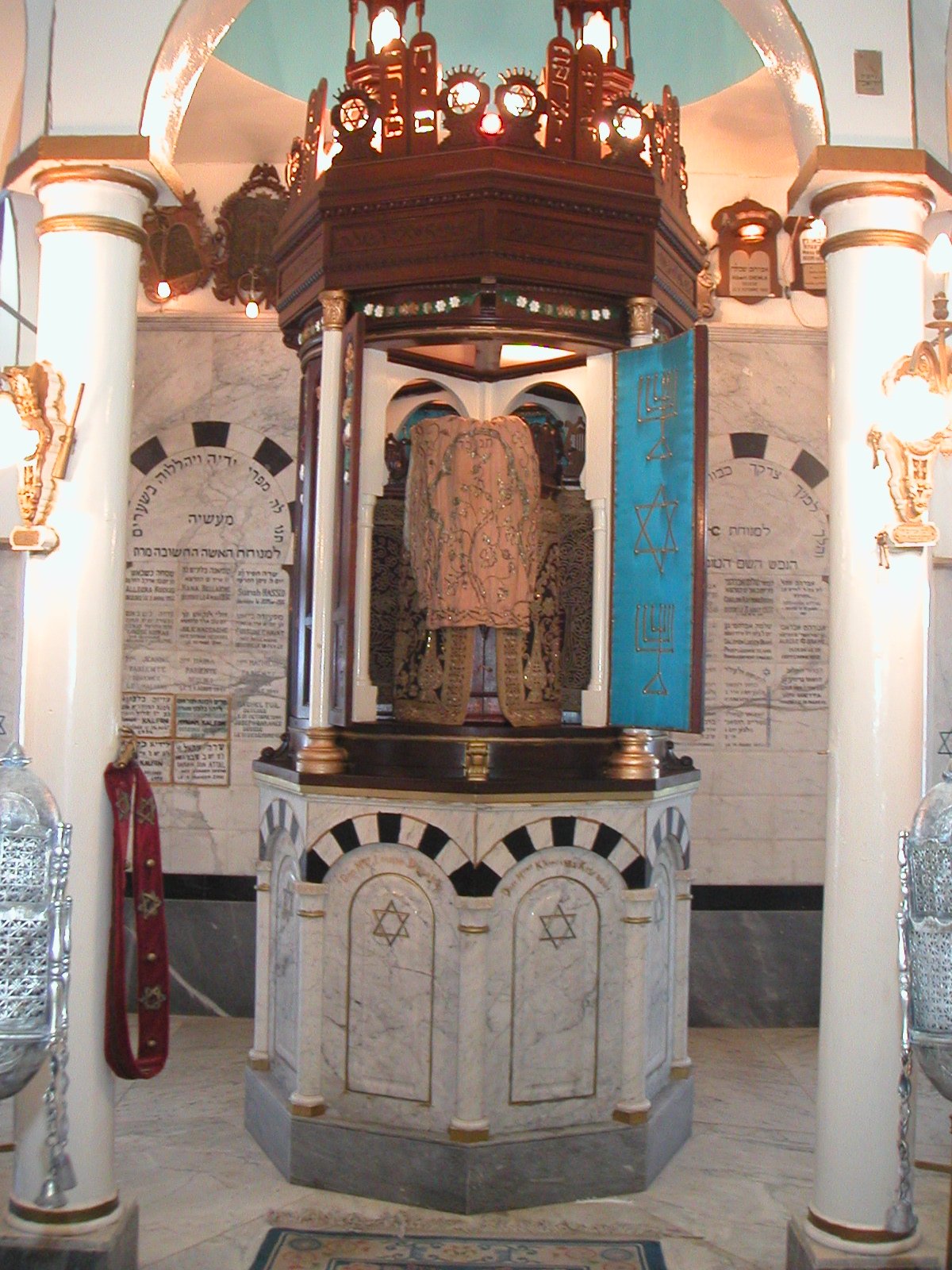
The open Heikhal

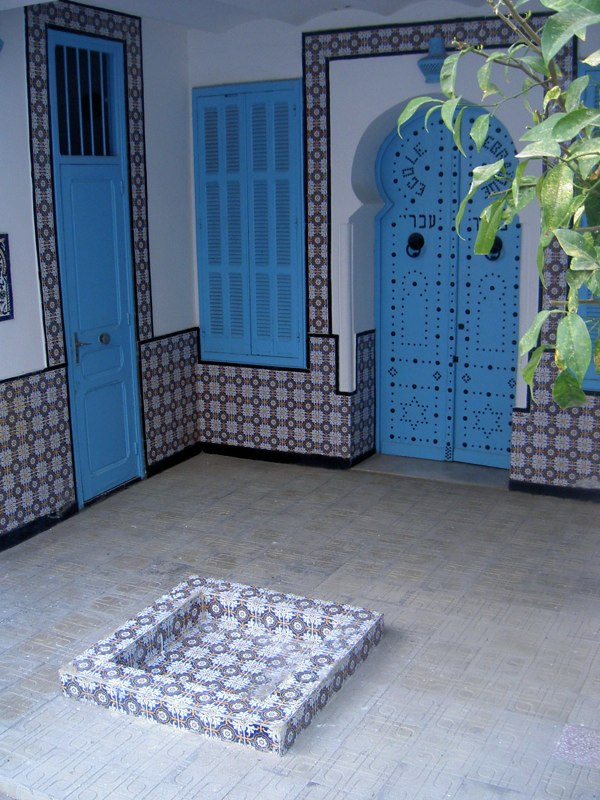
Entry to the Talmudic School

== See also ==
- History of the Jews in Tunisia
- List of synagogues in Tunisia
