= Zarzis Synagogue =

Orthodox synagogue in Zarzis, Tunisia

- Arabic: كنيس جرجيس; Hebrew: בית הכנסת משכן יעקב
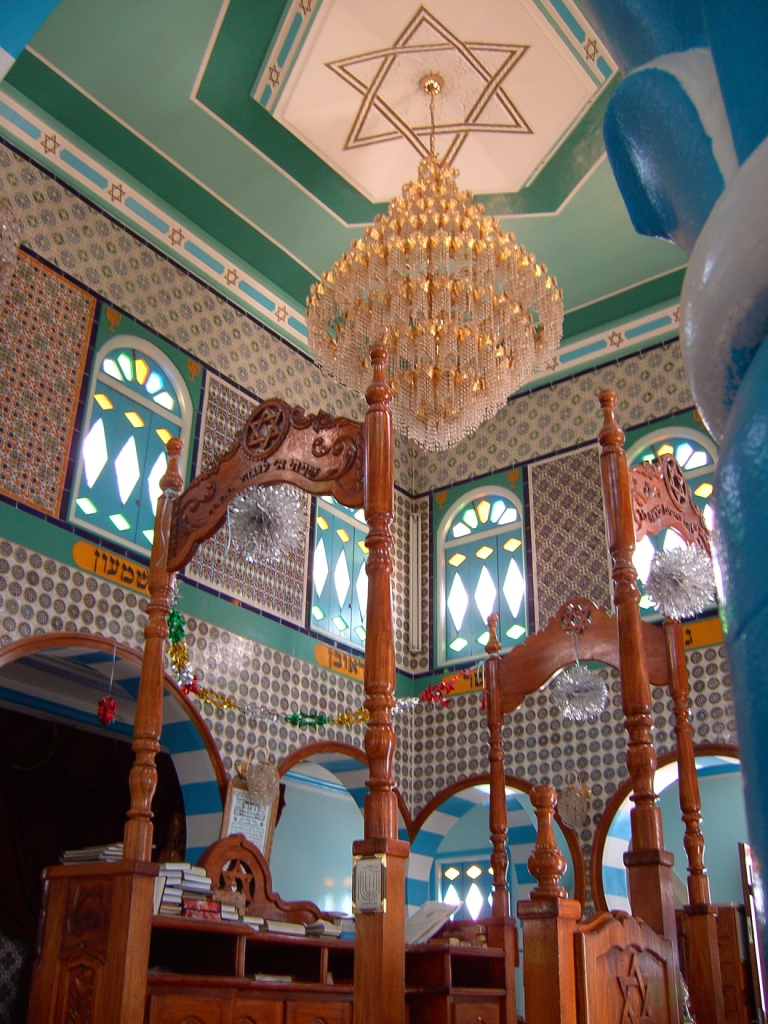
- Interior of the synagogue, in 2007

- Location of the synagogue in Tunisia

Religion
- Affiliation: Orthodox Judaism
- Rite: Nusach Sefard
- Ecclesiastical or organizational status: Synagogue
- Leadership: Rabbi Eliyahu Sofer
- Status: Active

Location
- Location: Zarzis
- Country: Tunisia
- Interactive map of Zarzis Synagogue
- Coordinates: 33°30′00″N 11°07′00″E

Architecture
- Type: Synagogue architecture
- Completed: 1905

The Zarzis Synagogue (Arabic: كنيس جرجيس; Hebrew: בית הכנסת משכן יעקב, romanized: Beit HaKnesset Mishkan Ya’akov, lit. 'Mishkan Yaakov Synagogue'), is a Jewish congregation and synagogue, located in the coastal town of Zarzis, Tunisia. The synagogue was completed in 1905, when the Jewish community of Zarzis numbered approximately 1,000.

An arson attack in 1982, following the Sabra and Shatila massacre in Lebanon, left the synagogue and Torah scrolls totally destroyed. It was subsequently rebuilt and used by the town's remaining 150 Jews.

The lavishly decorated synagogue leads into an open-air courtyard which has adjoining rooms which serve as the talmud torah. As of 2007, Rabbi Eliyahu Sofer was the head of the community.

== See also ==
- History of the Jews in Tunisia
- List of synagogues in Tunisia
