= 1984 Egyptian intifada =

1984 intifada in Egypt (1984 الانتفاضة المصرية)
- Date: October 1, 1984 - October 2, 1984
- Location: Egypt
- Caused by: Food price hikes
- Goals: End to Food price hikes; New governmental programmes to end inflation rates
- Methods: Demonstrations
- Result: Protests suppressed by force; Withdrawal of Prices

Deaths and injuries
- Death: 1-3
- Injuries: 13

The 1984 Egyptian intifada (Arabic:1984 الانتفاضة المصرية) was a bloody uprising and civil resistance movement that rocked northern Egypt against food prices and Inflation that skyrocketed under the presidency of Hosni Mubarak. On 1 October, in Kafr-el-Dawwar, Riots rocked the city led by mostly workers against the prices of basic economic goods and prices. It would be the biggest and most bloodiest protests in Egypt since the 1977 Egyptian bread riots and the first and biggest political challenge in Hosni Mubarak’s presidency.

Riots was met with a violent response by the military, protesters were cracked down on rioters clashed with the military forces in Alexandria and it's outskirts. Protests continued throughout the day; 8 hours passed, opposition strikes was organised and was suppressed harshly and the movement was quashed. 1 demonstrator was killed during the violent clashes when Live ammunition and Bullets was fired to quell the mass disturbances and wave of discontent.

== See also ==
- 1977 Egyptian bread riots
