= Bet Mordechai Synagogue, La Goulette =

Synagogue in La Goulette, Tunisia

Bet Mordechai Synagogue
- French: Synagogue Beit Mordekhai
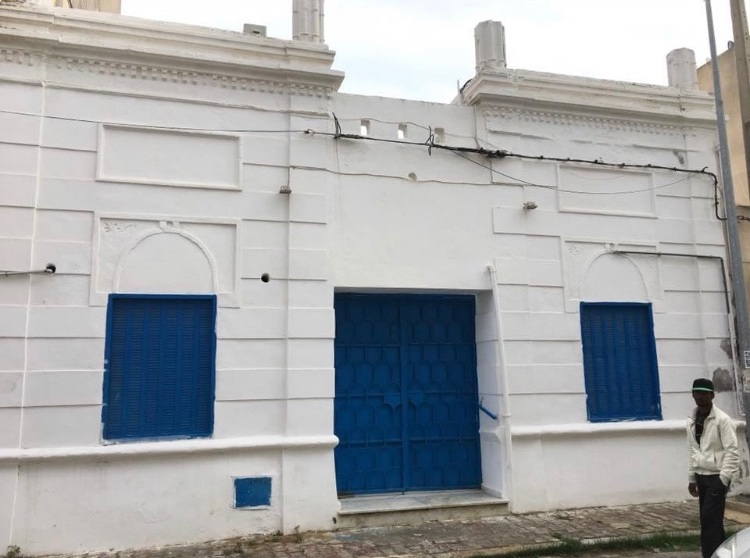
- Façade of the synagogue, in 2020

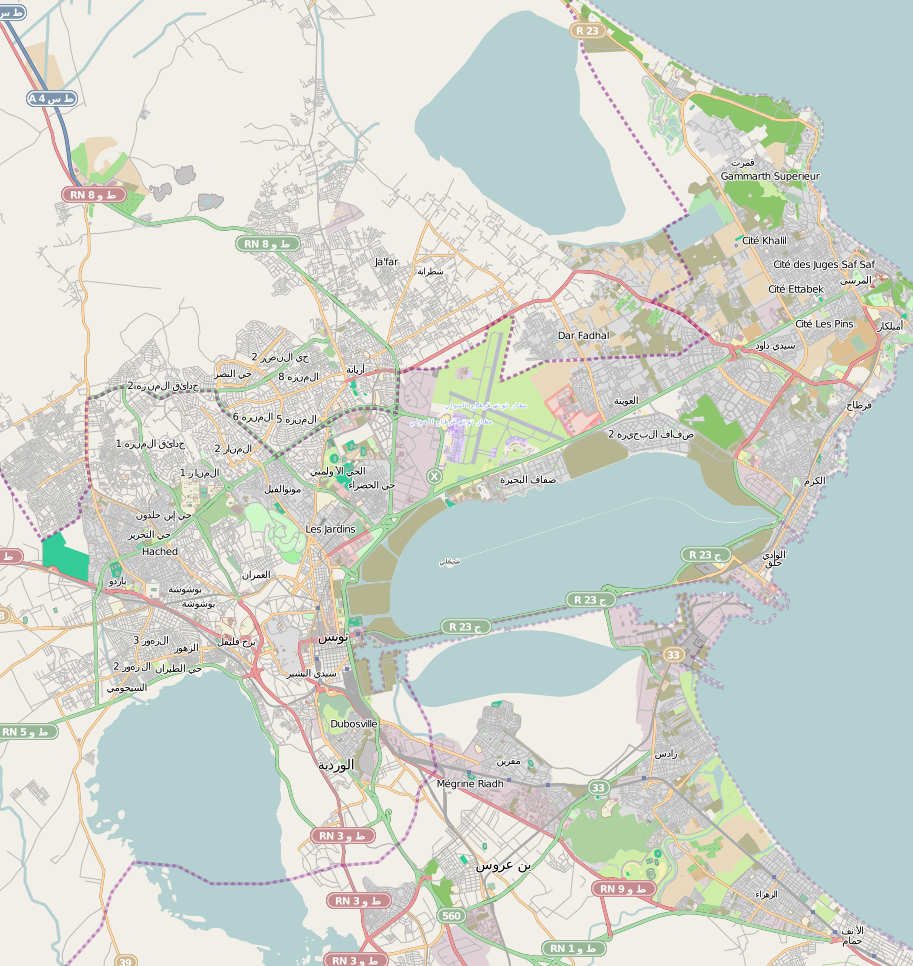
- Location of the synagogue in Greater Tunis

Religion
- Affiliation: Judaism
- Ecclesiastical or organisational status: Synagogue
- Status: Active

Location
- Location: Rue Khaznadar, La Goulette, Tunis
- Country: Tunisia
- Coordinates: 36°49′16″N 10°18′29″E

Architecture
- Architect: Benoît Barsotti
- Type: Synagogue architecture
- Style: Neoclassical; Moorish Revival
- Founder: Isaac Bessis
- Completed: c. 1910s

The Bet Mordechai Synagogue (French: Synagogue Beit Mordekhai), also known as the Bessis Synagogue or the Hospital Synagogue, is a Jewish congregation and synagogue, located on Rue Khaznadar in La Goulette, a suburb of Tunis, Tunisia.

== Architecture ==
The building was donated to the community by community-member Isaac Bessis in the 1910s and was designed by Italian architect Benoît Barsotti. Barsotti included both neoclassical and orientalist elements in the design of the building, including acroteria, columns and corniches. Despite its style choices, it does not differ much from other buildings on the street.

Access to the synagogue involves going through a passage that leads to the building façade (now separated from the street). Above the front door of the building are the Stone Tablets of the Ten Commandments. Inside, the sanctuary is a square room centred around four pillars which once supported an upper women's section and a skylight before renovations in the 1980s replaced it with a portico above the Torah Ark.

The building was reconstructed in 1995 after the roof collapsed in 1994.

== Gallery ==
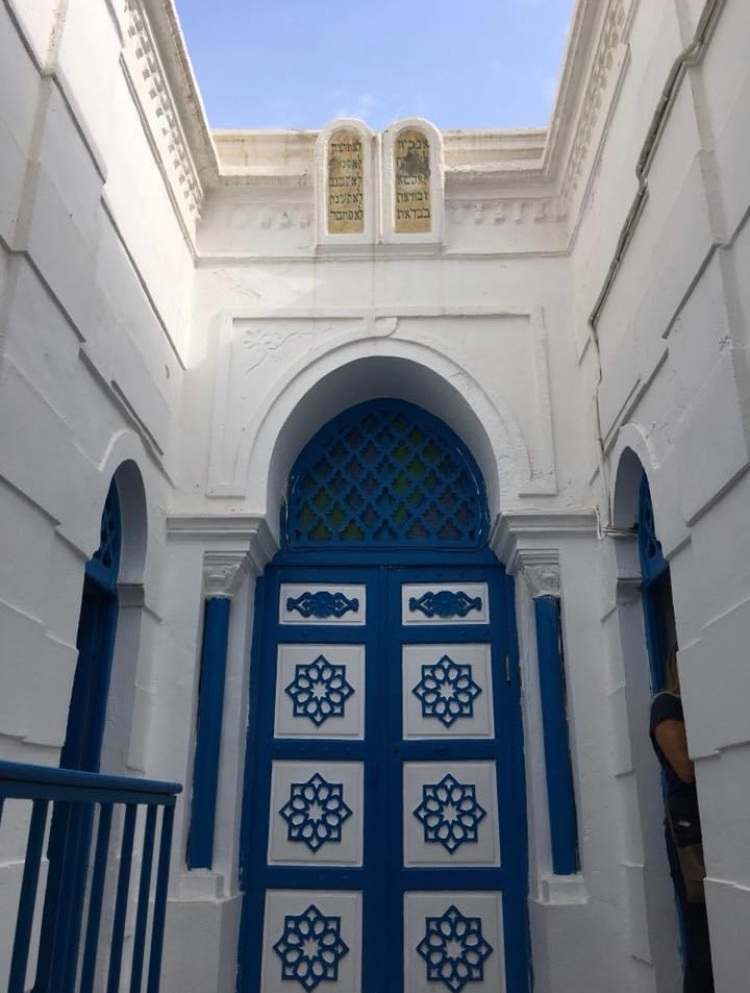
Entrance door with the Ten Commandments overhead

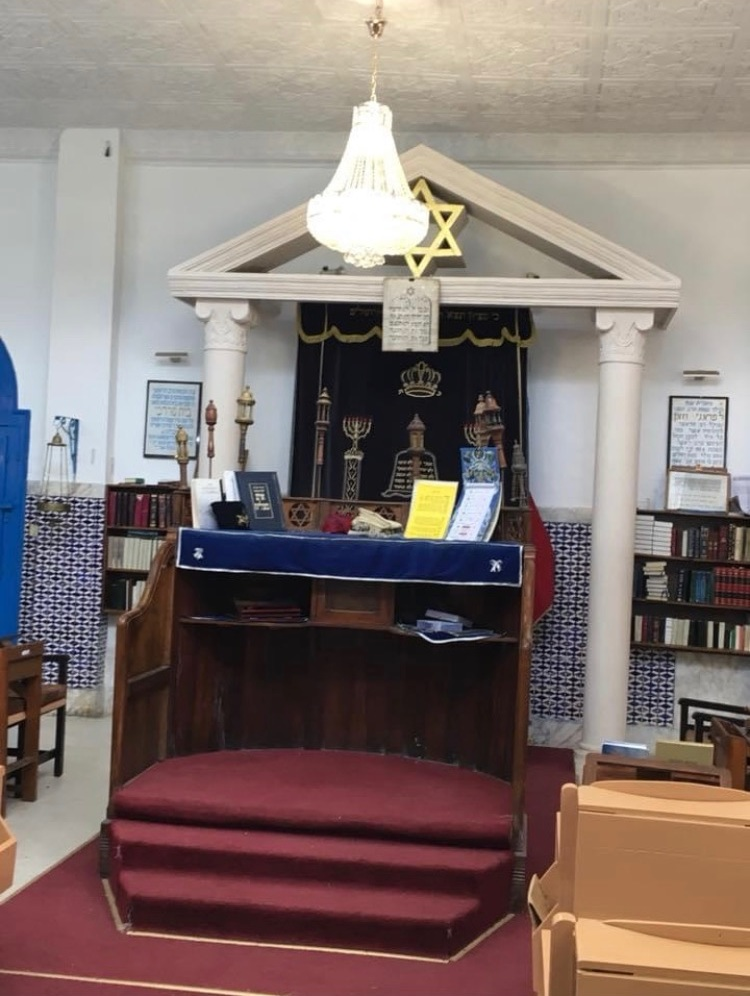
Sanctuary with the Holy Ark

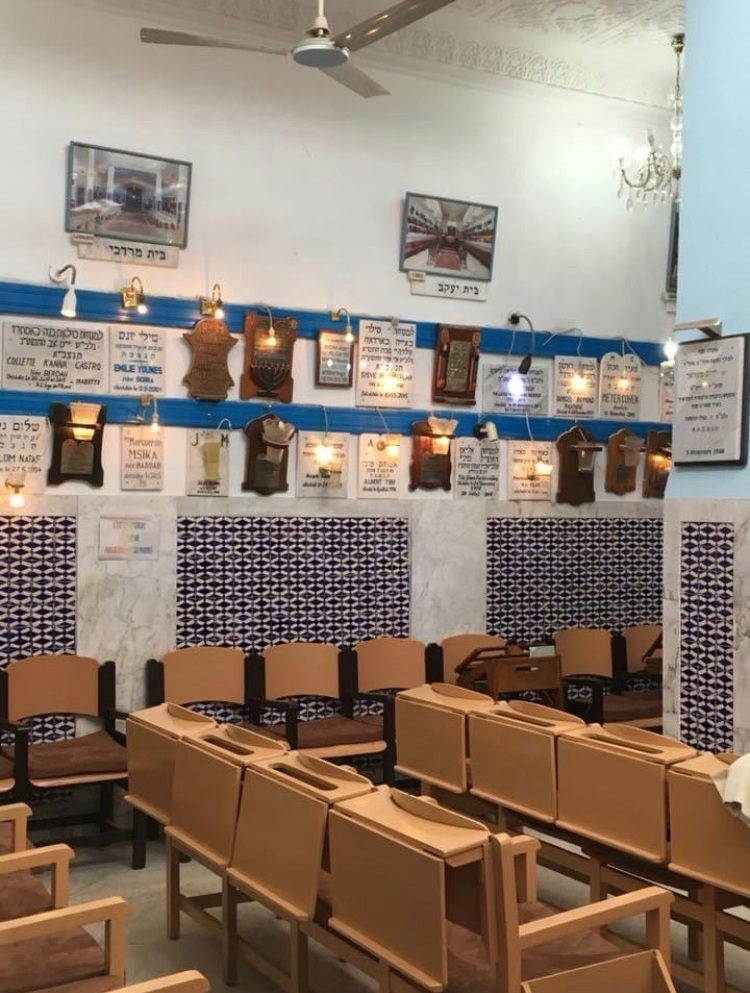
Dedications on a side wall

== See also ==
- History of the Jews in Tunisia
- List of synagogues in Tunisia
