= Khaybar Khaybar ya yahud =

Islamic chant

"Khaybar, Khaybar, ya yahud! Jaish Muhammad soufa yaʿoud!" (Arabic: خيبر خيبر يا يهود جيش محمد سوف يعود, lit. 'Khaybar, Khaybar, o Jews! The army of Muhammad will return!') is an Arabic-language rallying slogan coined in the late 1980s, during the First Intifada, and used by Hamas. It is chanted primarily at public anti-Israel demonstrations, but has also been invoked by a convicted Islamist terrorist after being sentenced to death. The slogan is widely regarded as anti-Semitic.

== Background ==
The slogan was coined in the late 1980s during the First Intifada by Ahmed Yassin, founder of the militant Palestinian Islamist organization Hamas.

Its literal meaning in English is "Khaybar, Khaybar, o Jews! The army of Muhammad will return!" The words reference the Battle of Khaybar of 628 CE, which began after Muhammad marched with a large Muslim army and besieged Khaybar, an oasis in present-day Saudi Arabia that was home to an established Jewish community.

== Anti-semitism ==
The chant has been categorized as antisemitic by the American news broadcaster PBS, the Israeli newspaper The Times of Israel, the British advocacy group Muslims Against Antisemitism, and the American advocacy group Anti-Defamation League.

== Usage ==
=== Anti-Israel protests ===
The slogan has since been embraced more widely by Islamists, Islamic extremists and anti-Israel militants. It has been chanted at Islamic extremist and pro-Palestinian demonstrations, including in Jerusalem, Sweden, England, Austria, Belgium, the Netherlands, and Australia. The chant is employed more frequently during periods of violence between Israel and the Palestinians, such as during the 2021 Israel–Palestine crisis and the Gaza war.

In Europe, those chanting it have faced criminal charges, including incitement to hatred.

Shaima Dallali stepped down as president of the National Union of Students in 2022 after controversy surrounding allegations of antisemitism, including her previous use of the phrase "Khaybar Khaybar O Jews … Muhammad’s army will return Gaza."

=== Use by a terrorist ===
Indonesian terrorist Amrozi, involved in the 2002 Bali bombings, shouted the slogan before being sentenced to death in August 2003 in a Bali courtroom.

== See also ==
- Antisemitism in Islam
- Antisemitism in the Arab world
- Calls for the destruction of Israel
- Globalize the intifada
- From the river to the sea
- Death to Arabs
- Death to Israel
- Sarkha
