= Yossef Guez =

Tunisian rabbi

Yosef Guez (1860 in Sousse – 1934), also known as Youssef Guez and Youssef el Guidj, was a Grand Rabbi of Tunisia. He served in Sousse (1906–1928) then in Tunis (1928–1934) where he served as Grand Rabbi of Tunisia until his death.

== Biography ==
Guez was the grandson of the namesake Rabbi Yosef Guez, whose name he received according to the Sephardic tradition. He is the son of Rabbi Chaim David Guez and a direct descendant of the Chief Rabbi David Guez who was a Talmudist of North Africa. He belongs to a rabbinical dynasty dating back at least to the 17th century. He founded the synagogue Keter Torah (כתר תורה), now the only synagogue in Sousse.

Some stories were collected about him and his life in 1990.

== Works ==
He was the author of several books and manuscripts, including:

- A collection of halachic decisions that was published in 2008: Yagen HaShem;
- 1931 - A manual of preparation for the Bar Mitzvah of the Grand Rabbinate of Tunis.
- 1903–1908 - יקרא דשכבי Sermons on the deceased by Rabbi Sermons on the deceased by Rabbi Yosef Gaz during his tenure in the cities of Mahdia and Susa in the years 1903-1908.

== Honours ==
He was decorated by the French President Gaston Doumergue, Knight of the Legion of Honor in 1929.
