= El Hamma =

El Hamma الحامة
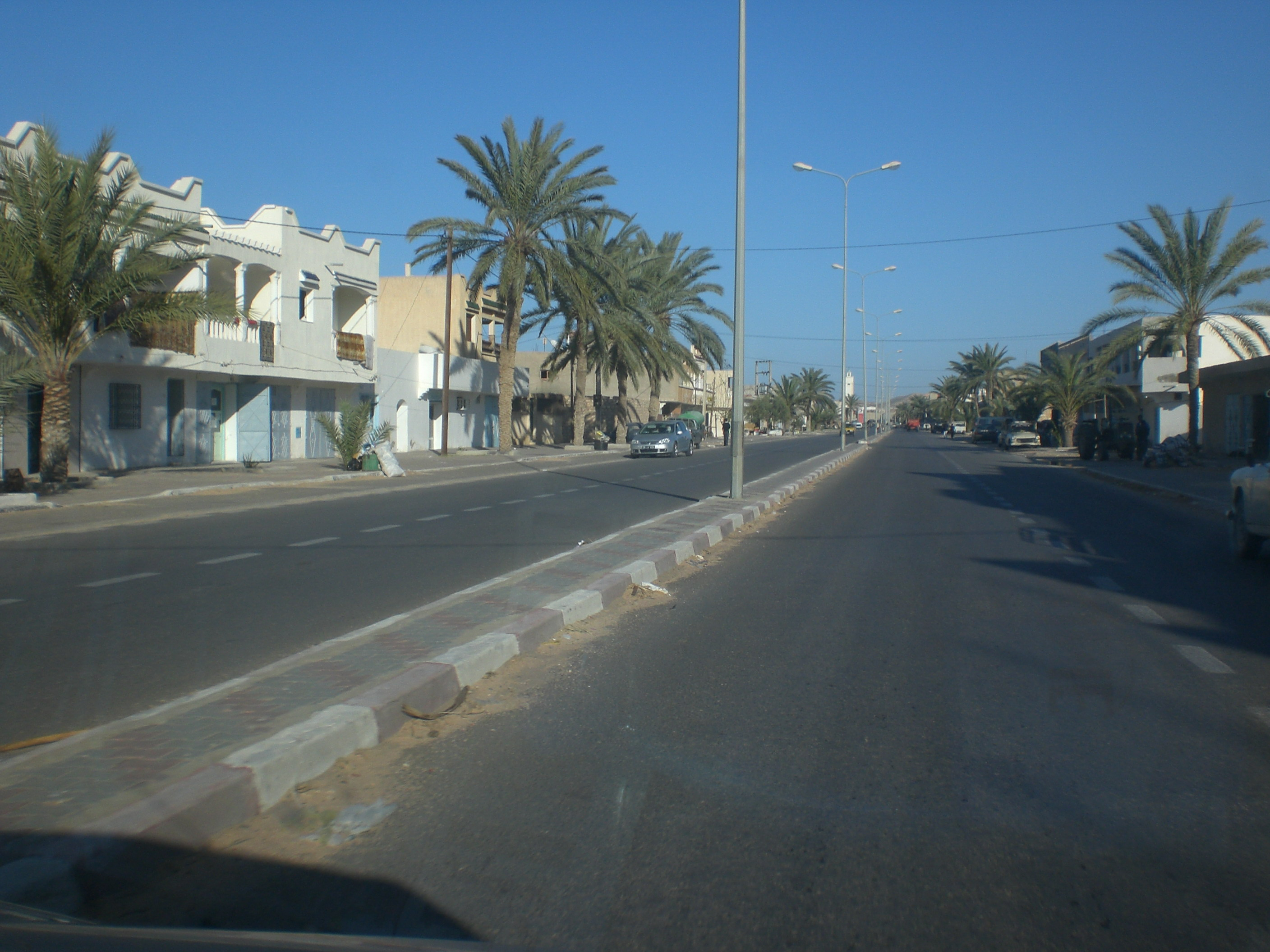

- Location in Tunisia
- Coordinates: 33°53′N 9°47′E
- Country: Tunisia
- Governorate: Gabès Governorate

Population (2022)
  - Total: 47,000
- Time zone: UTC1 (CET)

El Hamma (Arabic: الحامة Al Ḥāmmah) is an oasis town located in the Gabès Governorate, 30 kilometers west of Gabès, Tunisia and near the eastern end of Chott el Fejej. Its population in 2014 was 73,512.

== Etymology ==
The Arabic name (حامة) comes from the word for "hot water" (الماء الحام), a reference to the thermal springs that are widespread in the region. The similar names Hamma or Hammamet (the spas) are given to other towns and villages across North Africa.

== Geography ==
Located along the Gabès-Kébili road, and at an altitude of about fifty meters, the town borders the Chott el-Fejej. It is one of the natural outlets of the great Albian Aquifer. The oasis has several sources which together form the El Hamma ouads which are 300 meters from each other. Among these are Aïn El Bordj, Aïn Chaaliya and Aïn Abdelkader.

A small mountain range 220 meters above sea level separates El Hamma from the Gabès.

== History ==
The town is in the ancestral lands of the Beni Zid tribe and their neighbors the Matmata tribes.

The Matmata (Berber: Imatmaten, Arabic: مطماطة) are a tribal confederation of Berber tribes, specifically Beni Faten, living mainly between Tunisia, Algeria and Morocco. The ancestor of Matmata is called Maskab and nicknamed Matmat. In ancient times the Matmata inhabited the plateaus of Mindas, around Ouancherich (current Ouarsenis), and Mount Guezoul Tiaret and the great interior plains of Tunisia today. They became powerful at the beginning of the eleventh century, and actively participated in the war between Hammad ibn Bologhine and Badis Ibn El Mansour.

Leo d'African visited El Hamma in the mid-sixteenth century noting that

"It evokes the extremely hot spring that flows a mile and a half from the city and forms the stream that runs through the city in its middle in wide canals."

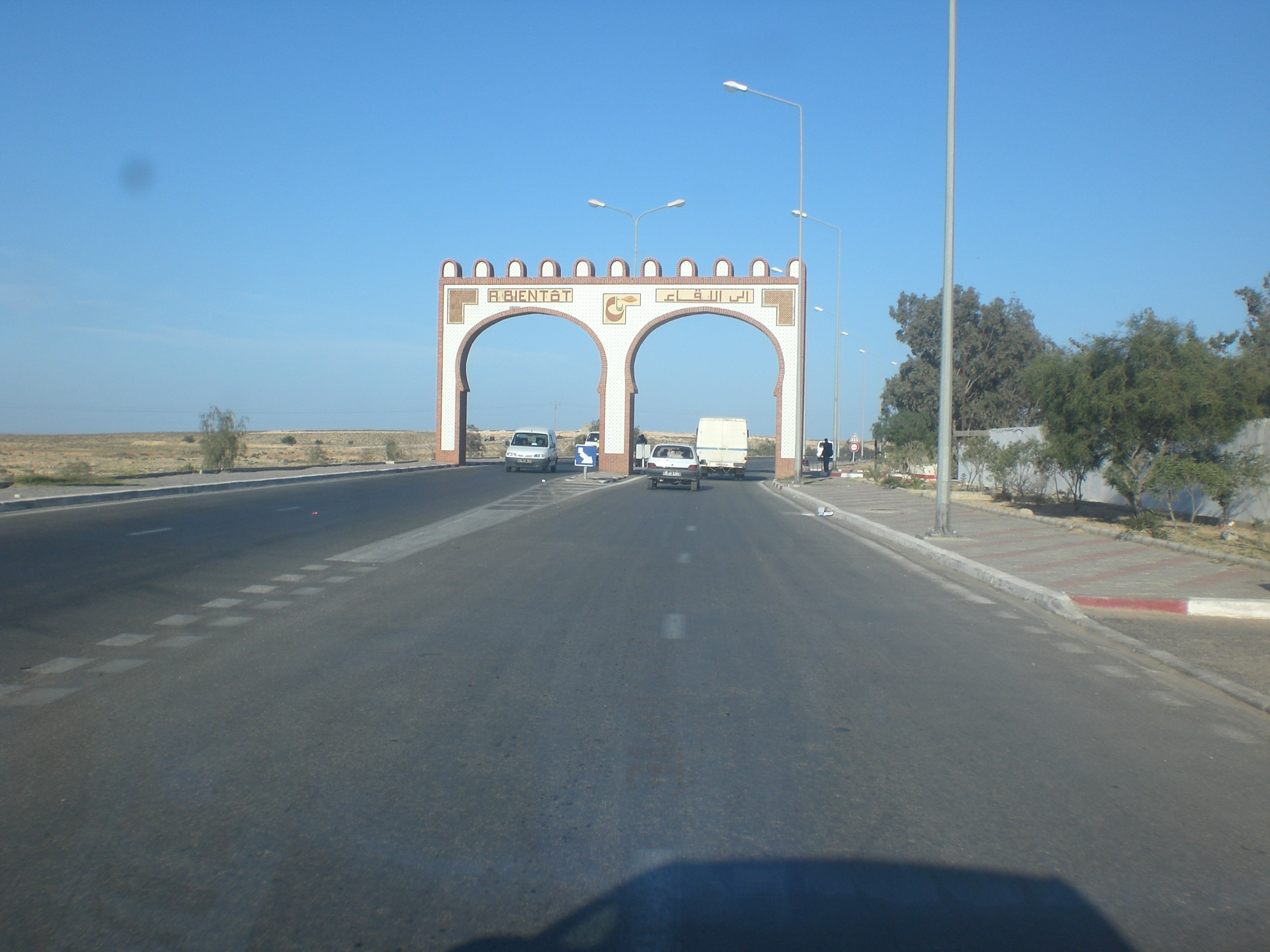
El Hamma

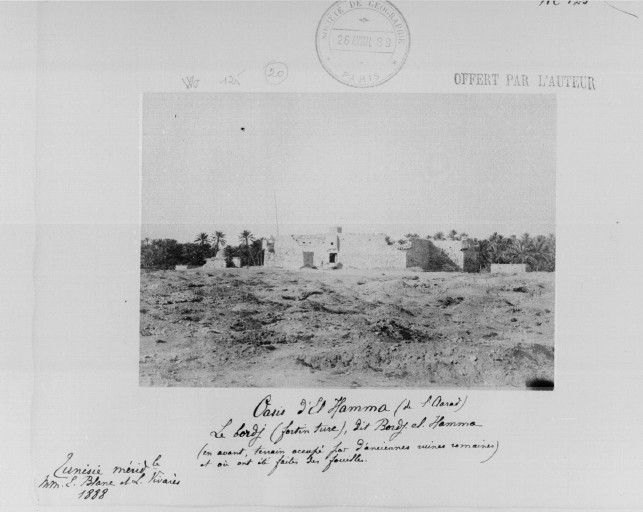
El Hamma in 1886

The English explorer Dr. Thomas Shaw who, as early as 1743, spoke of the city in these terms:

"The city of El Hamma is four leagues west of Gabes: the Tunisians have a small fort and a garrison because it is one of their border places [...] There are several baths, which each have a roof covered with straw, and in their basins, which are about twelve feet square and four deep, there is, for the convenience of those who bathe, stone benches a little to below the surface of the water."

Victor Guérin described the town in 1862

"At one o'clock, we arrive at El Hamma. This oasis is made up of several villages, which are: El Kasr, the most important of all, Dabdaba, where we ask hospitality to Sheikh, Soumbat, Zaouïet El Madjeba and Bou Atouche. Palm plantations watered by running water surround these villages. These waters come from four hot springs, three of which are in Dabdaba and the fourth between Dabdaba and El Kasr. They were formerly enclosed in basins built in very beautiful cut stones and still exist, at least in part, because many blocks have been moved or removed. To each of these basins is attached a small bathhouse of modern construction but divided internally into several compartments that are ancient. The temperature of these sources varies: the hottest is forty-five degrees centigrade, the lowest is thirty-four degrees centigrade. Between Dabdaba and El Kasr once stretched a town called Aqua Tacapitanae, because it depended on Tacape, from which it was separated by an interval of 18 Roman miles. It is mentioned in the Route of Antonin. It is now completely destroyed and its debris has been used to build the modern villages that have succeeded it and a fort called Bordj El Hamma"

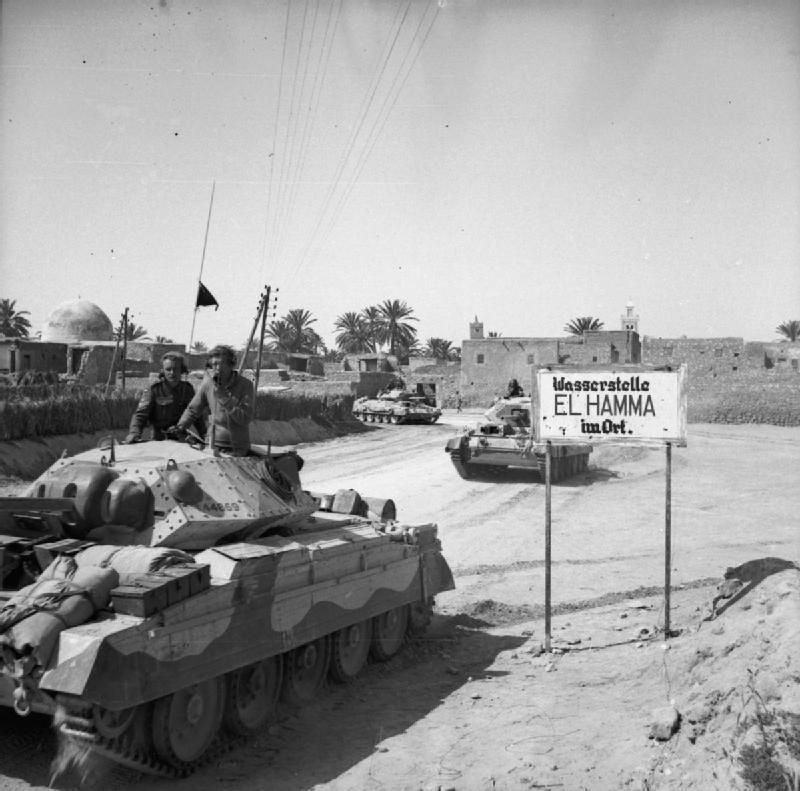
British Crusader tanks in El Hamma, 29 March 1943. The German writing means water supply in the town.

At the end of the 19th century, André Martel, estimated Beni Zid tribe had nearly 19,000 inhabitants, a quarter of whom permanently reside in the oasis of El Hamma. today a majority most of the Beni Zid are settled permanently in the Oasis.

On 29 March 1943, New Zealand and British forced defeated the Germans at the Battle of the Mareth Line and entered El Hamma.

The completion of several deep bore holes to supply water to the Gabès cement plant in the 1980s and 1990s, saw a drying up of several hot springs including Aïn Echoffa, and a degradation of the palm grove farms.

In 2023, the El Hamma synagogue was heavily damaged by rioters during pro-Palestine protests surrounding the Gaza war.

== Economy ==
Agriculture has long been the main economic sector of activity in Hammah, the city's economy has diversified in recent years and the industry employs more than a third of the towns assets.

The hotel and tourism sector is also experiencing particularly significant growth thanks to a rehabilitation program co-financed by the World Bank.

== Trivia ==
The Swiss singer-songwriter Mani Matter (1936 – 1972) has brought the town of El Hamma to the knowledge of most German-speaking Swiss. After spending his holidays there, he wrote a song about a man called Sidi Abdel Assar who allegedly lived there, unhappily fell in love with a beautiful woman whose dowry he could not afford, and then settling for another woman who was affordable, less beautiful – but intelligent. In 2008, presenter Mona Vetsch of the SRF Swiss TV searched for the real person behind the song, but finding no-one.
