= Palestinian resistance =

Palestinian resistance (Arabic: المقاومة الفلسطينية) may refer to:

- Palestinian right of armed resistance
- Palestinian political violence
- Palestinian nationalism
