= First Sahrawi Intifada =

Part of the Western Sahara conflict

Independence Intifada
- Part of Western Sahara conflict
- Date: 1999–2004 main phase: September 1999–early 2000
- Location: Western Sahara, south of Morocco
- Goals: Respect of Sahrawi human rights
- Methods: Demonstrations; Civil resistance; Rioting
- Result: Sahrawi uprising suppressed

Parties
(Western Sahara) Sahrawi activists: Sahrawi students; National Association of Unemployed University Graduates; Sahrawi miners	Government of Morocco: General Inspectorate of Auxiliary Forces; Royal Moroccan Gendarmerie; Urban Security Groups

Casualties and losses
Hundreds arrested, some wounded	

The First Sahrawi Intifada forms part of the wider and ongoing Western Sahara conflict. It began in 1999 and lasted until 2004, transforming into the Independence Intifada in 2005.

== Background ==
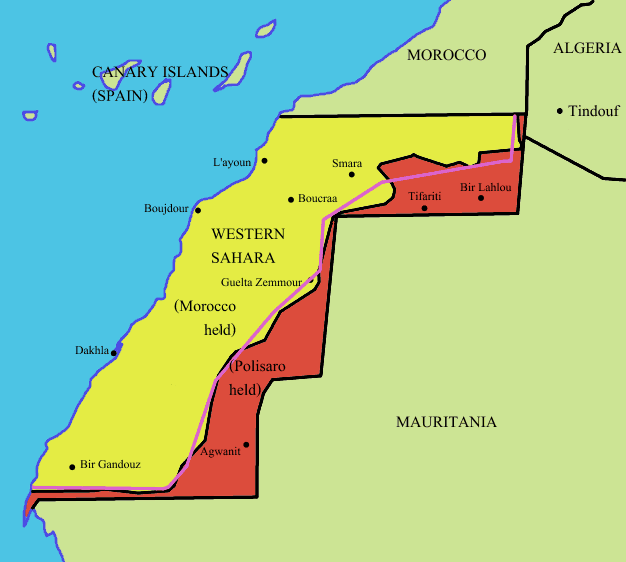
Status quo in Western Sahara since the 1991 ceasefire: mostly under Moroccan occupation, with inner Polisario-controlled areas forming the Sahrawi Arab Republic

Western Sahara, formerly Spanish Sahara, was annexed by Morocco in 1975, as Spain pulled out. This sparked a war with the Polisario Front, which, according to the UN, represent the indigenous Sahrawi population; it was backed by neighboring Algeria. In 1976, the main Sahrawi movement, the Polisario Front, declared statehood of the Sahrawi Arab Democratic Republic (SADR) in Polisario-controlled areas of Western Sahara. In 1991, a ceasefire between Polisario and Morocco was agreed upon, on the condition of a referendum on self-determination to be held in Moroccan-occupied Western Sahara (including the options of independence or integration into Morocco). Since 1991, the terms of a referendum have been subject to years of dispute between the parties, although the ceasefire continues to hold despite remaining tensions. Morocco controls the majority of the territory, with Polisario forces controlling a rump. A UN mission, MINURSO, patrols the demarcation line.

Sahrawi political activity in the Moroccan-controlled parts of Western Sahara remains severely restricted, and police crackdowns and forced disappearances have been a frequent response to civil protest. The political climate gradually relaxed in the 1990s after the ceasefire, and following considerable liberalization in Morocco proper.

== First Intifada ==
=== 1999 protests ===
Since political liberalization, intermittent protests have broken out and pro-Polisario groups have declared minor "intifadas" in 1999 and 2000, often resulting in dozens of demonstrators being arrested. The First Sahrawi Intifada began in late 1999 and was characterized by large-scale protests. King Hassan II, who had pledged democracy and reform, had died on 23 July, creating a new political atmosphere.

In early September 1999, Sahrawi students held a sit-in at al-Zamlah Square in al-'Ayun, the capital of the territory, demanding scholarships and transportation subsidies to Moroccan universities located in northern Morocco. Many students sat in a constant vigil underneath tents in the square, which directly faced Najir Hotel, where United Nations personnel stayed during their visits. The square was also symbolic because of its past history: in 1970, the Spanish army had killed a group of Sahrawis protesting for independence in the square. The students were also joined by Sahrawi political prisoners, arguing for compensation and an end to the common "disappearances" of other political activists. Shortly, they were also joined by Sahrawi mine workers and Sahrawi members of the "National Association of Unemployed University Graduates" in Morocco. The demonstrators occupied al-Zamlah Square for 12 days before Moroccan officials responded, sending police to break up the protest, beating protesters, and arresting many; some Sahrawis were reportedly driven out into the desert and left there.

Sahrawi activists organized another protest five days later in which they demanded independence and a referendum. It is claimed that in response, Moroccan officials authorized local thugs to ransack Sahrawi homes and businesses. State security forces arrested 150 demonstrators during the protest, and rounded up many more in the early months of 2000. Though security forces released the prisoners fairly quickly, Sahrawi activists accused the police of torture and other maltreatment during detainment. Throughout the First Intifada, Sahrawi protests attracted other Moroccan settlers. Witnessing the violence and injustices, many of Morocco's own Sahrawis became disillusioned with Moroccan government policy.

=== Political regrouping ===
In November 1999, Sahrawi political activists, who had been jailed and "disappeared", formed the Truth and Justice Forum, which sought government redress of human rights violations and injustices. A branch of this group was formed in al-'Ayun, Western Sahara, by Sahrawi activists on 26 August 2000. The Moroccan government had little tolerance towards the Sahara Branch, stating that it was a pro-independence campaigner, and in November 2002, Moroccan courts created legislation to outlaw the organization. Protests persisted throughout the years 2000 to 2004, but small peace developments were made during the time period (such as the Baker Plan of 2003, which was the United Nations' proposal to grant self-determination to the territory), influencing activist mindsets and the protest environment.

=== Reconciliation attempts ===
In January 2004, Sahrawi political activist groups united under the Collective of Sahrawi Human Rights Defenders. The collective demanded the formation of an international commission of inquiry to investigate human rights injustices in the Western Sahara. Aminatou Haidar, the president of the collective, and Ali Salem Tamek, vice president, were both organizers of the Sahrawi plight. Also in January 2004, Moroccan King Mohammed released and pardoned twelve Sahrawi activists, some of whom had been involved in the Sahara Branch of the Truth and Justice Forum. By 2005, however, discussions for peace negotiations had reached a standstill. Out of this, a new wave of Sahrawi nonviolent protest erupted, in what is known as the Second Sahrawi Intifada or Independence Intifada.

== Aftermath ==
The Independence Intifada refers to a series of disturbances, demonstrations, and riots that broke out in May 2005 in the Moroccan-controlled parts of Western Sahara and in southern Morocco.

== See also ==
- Human rights in Western Sahara
- Human rights in Morocco
- Years of lead
- Zemla Intifada
