= Ronen Badash =

Israeli footballer (born 1977)

Ronen Badash רונן בדש
Personal information
- Full name: Ronen Badash
- Date of birth: October 31, 1977 (age 48)
- Place of birth: Netanya, Israel
- Position: Midfielder

Youth career
- Maccabi Netanya

Senior career*
| Years | Team | Apps | (Gls) |
| 1996–2000 | Maccabi Netanya | | |
| 2000 | → Maccabi Herzliya (loan) | | |
| 2000–2001 | Hapoel Nazareth Illit | | |
| 2001–2003 | Bnei Yehuda Tel Aviv | 28 | (1) |
- * Club domestic league appearances and goals

Ronen Badash (Hebrew: רונן בדש; born 31 October 1977) is an Israeli former footballer who is of Tunisian-Jewish descent.

== Honours ==
- Liga Leumit (1):
  - 1998-99
