= History of the Jews in Tunisia =

Tunisian Jews
יהדות תוניסיה
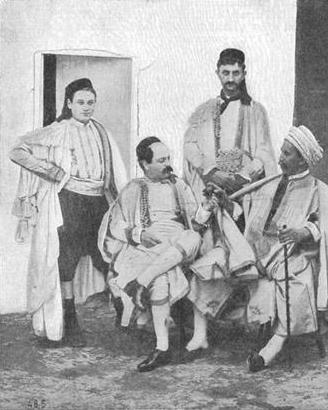
- Jews of Tunis, c. 1900

Total population
- 50,000–300,000

Regions with significant populations
- Israel, Tunisia, United States, Canada, France

Languages
- Hebrew, Arabic, Judeo-Tunisian Arabic, English, French, Berber

Religion
- Judaism

Related ethnic groups
- Jews, Maghrebi Jews, Mizrahi Jews

The location of Tunisia in Africa

The history of the Jews in Tunisia dates back nearly two thousand years to the Punic era. The Jewish community of Tunisia grew following successive waves of immigration and proselytism before its development was hampered by the imposition of anti-Jewish measures in the Byzantine Empire in late antiquity. After the Muslim conquest of Tunisia, Tunisian Jews experienced periods of relative freedom or cultural apogee which were followed by periods of more marked discrimination and persecution. Under Muslim rule, Jews were granted legal status as dhimmi, which legally assured protections of life, property, and freedom of religion, but imposed an increased tax burden on them. The community developed its own dialect of Arabic, but the use of Judeo-Tunisian Arabic has declined due to the community's relocation from Tunisia. The arrival of Jews expelled from the Iberian Peninsula, often through Livorno, greatly influenced the community's composition, inter-group relations, and customs.

The economic, social and cultural position of the community was significantly compromised during the Second World War due to the occupation of the French protectorate of Tunisia by the Axis powers.

The Israeli Declaration of Independence in 1948 and the ensuing 1948 Arab–Israeli War provoked a widespread antisemitic backlash in the Arab world, to which was added nationalist agitation, the nationalization of enterprises, the Arabization of education and the Arabization of part of the administration. Prior to Tunisian independence in 1956, the Jewish population was estimated at 105,000 individuals. These Jews lived mainly in Tunis, with communities also present on the island of Djerba. Jews left Tunisia en masse in subsequent years due notably to the Bizerte crisis in 1961 and the Six-Day War in 1967. The population had declined to 1500 by 2017.

The Jewish diaspora of Tunisia is divided between Israel and France, where it has preserved its community identity through its traditions, mostly dependent on Sephardic law and customs, but retaining its own specific characteristics. Djerbian Judaism in particular is considered to be more faithful to tradition because it remained outside the sphere of influence of the modernist currents. The Tunisian Jews who have relocated to Israel have switched to using Hebrew as their home language. Tunisian Jews living in France typically use French as their first language, while the few still left in Tunisia tend to use either French or Judeo-Tunisian Arabic in their everyday lives.

== Historiography ==
The history of the Jews of Tunisia (until the establishment of the French protectorate) was first studied by David Cazès in 1888 in his Essay on the History of the Israelites of Tunisia, André Chouraqui (1952), and later by Haim Zeev Hirschberg (1965), in the more general context of North African Judaism. The research on the subject was then enriched by Robert Attal and Yitzhak Avrahami. In addition, various institutions, including the Israel Folktale Archives in University of Haifa, the Hebrew University of Jerusalem, and the Ben Zvi Institute, have collected material evidence (traditional clothing, embroidery, lace, jewelry, etc.), traditions (folk tales, liturgical songs, etc.), and manuscripts as well as Judeo-Arabic books and newspapers. Paul Sebag is the first to provide in his 1991 book History of the Jews of Tunisia: from origins to our days a first development entirely devoted to the history of this community. In Tunisia, following the thesis of Abdelkrim Allagui, a group under the direction of Habib Kazdaghli and Abdelhamid Largueche brought the subject into the field of national academic research. Founded in Paris on June 3, 1997, the Society of Jewish History of Tunisia contributes to the research on the Jews of Tunisia and transmits their history through conferences, symposia and exhibitions.

According to Michel Abitbol, the study of Judaism in Tunisia has grown rapidly during the progressive dissolution of the Jewish community in the context of decolonization and the evolution of the Arab-Israeli conflict while Habib Kazdaghli believes that the departure of the Jewish community is the cause of the low number of studies which are relevant to the topic. Kazdaghli, however, points out that the publication of them has increased since the 1990s, due to their authors' attachment to this community, and the belief that the Jews originated in one or another community (Ariana, Bizerte, etc.) or the belief that they originated in multiple Tunisian communities. As for the fate of the Jewish community during the period of the German occupation of Tunisia (1942–1943), it remains relatively unknown, and during the Symposium on the Jewish Community of Tunisia which was held at Manouba University in February 1998 (the first of its kind on this research theme), it was not mentioned. However, the work of memory of the community exists, with the testimonies of Robert Borgel and Paul Ghez, the novels The Statue of Salt by Albert Memmi and Villa Jasmin by Serge Moati, as well as the works of some historians.

== Antiquity ==
=== Hypothetical origins ===
Presently, the earliest verifiable record of the presence in Jews in Tunisia is from the second century. However, there are other, mostly speculative, ideas about when Jews first arrived in the land which is presently known as Tunisia:

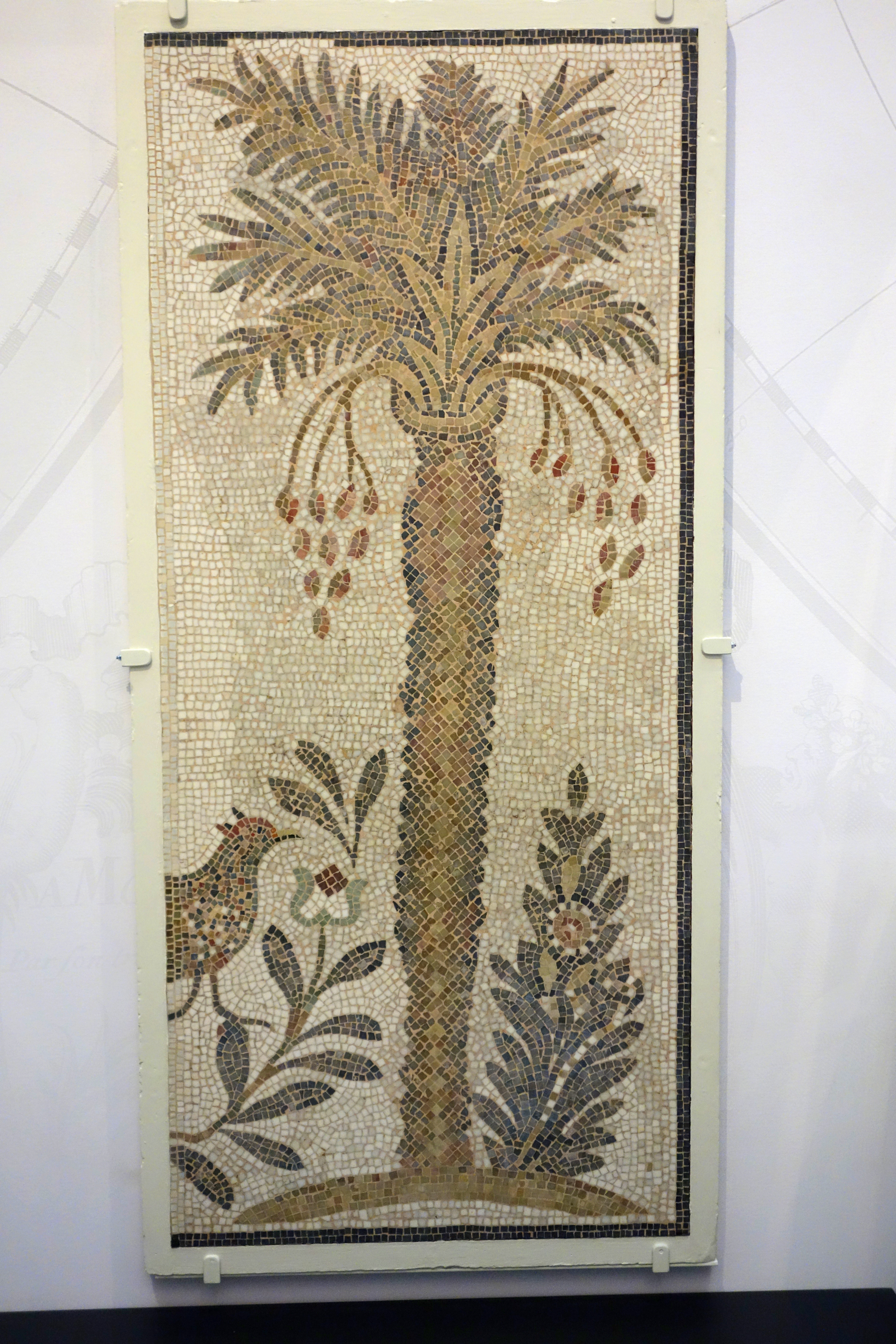
Date palm, Byzantine mosaic from the Roman synagogue of Naro in Hammam Lif, 6th century CE, Brooklyn Museum (New York).

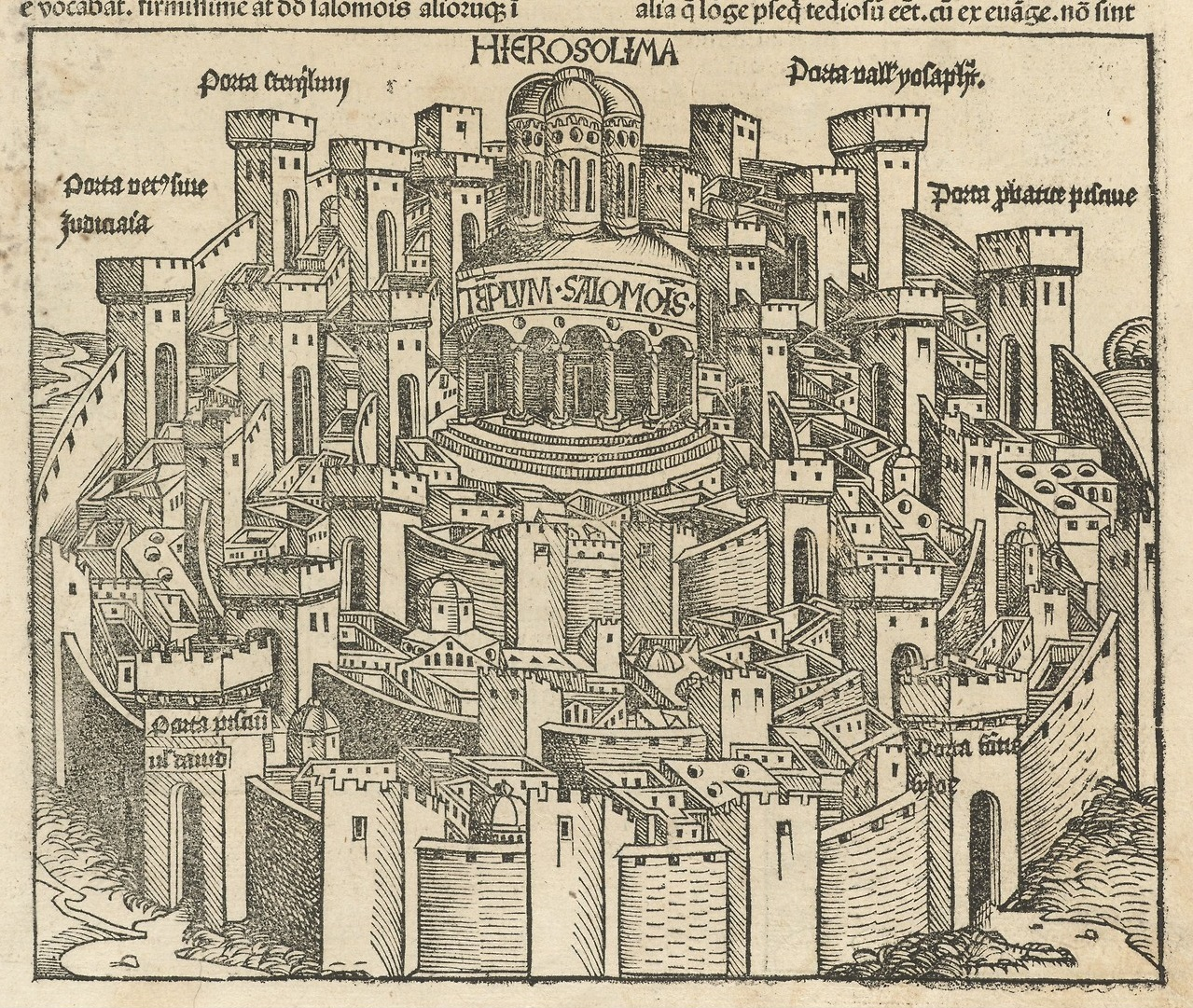
View of Jerusalem and the Temple of Solomon by Hartmann Schedel

- Some historians, such as David Cazès, Nahum Slouschz, and Alfred Louis Delattre, suggest, based on the biblical description of close maritime trade relations between Hiram I (ruler of the Phoenician city of Tyre) and Solomon (king of Israel), that Israelites may have been among the founders of Phoenician trading posts, including Carthage in 814 BCE.
- Josephus claims that the arrival of the first Jews in North Africa dates back to the 4th century BCE, during the reign of the Ptolemaic kings of Egypt, who recruited Jewish mercenaries from Alexandria in an attempt to reinforce Greek garrisons in Cyprus and Cyrenaica. These mercenaries formed the first North African communities, later strengthened by exiles from Judea following the destruction of the Second Temple in 70 CE.
- According to one of the founding legends of the Jewish community of Djerba, transcribed for the first time in 1849, the Kohens (members of the Jewish priestly class) settled in present-day Tunisia after the destruction of the Solomon's Temple by the Emperor Nebuchadnezzar II in 586 BC. They carried away a vestige of the destroyed Temple, believed to be a door, preserved it in the El Ghriba synagogue in Djerba, and turned it into a place of pilgrimage and veneration to the present day.

It is probable that these Israelites would have assimilated into the Punic population and offered sacrifices to its divinities, like Baal and Tanit. Thereafter, Jews from Alexandria or Cyrene could have settled in Carthage following the Hellenization of the eastern part of the Mediterranean Basin. The cultural context allowed them to practice Judaism more in keeping with ancestral traditions. Small Jewish communities existed in the later days of Punic domination over North Africa, without it being possible to say whether they developed or disappeared later. Jews had, in any case, settled in the new Roman province of Africa, and enjoyed the favors of Julius Caesar. The latter, in recognition of the support of King Antipater in his struggle against Pompey, recognized Judaism and the status of religio licita, and, according to Josephus, granted the Jews a privileged status under the Roman Empire. These Jews were joined by Jewish pilgrims, expelled from Rome for proselytizing, 20 by a number of defeated in the First Jewish–Roman War, deported and resold as slaves in North Africa, and also by Jews fleeing the repression of revolts in Cyrenaica and Judea under the reigns of the emperors Domitian, Trajan, and Hadrian. According to Josephus, the Romans deported 30,000 Jews to Carthage from Judea after the First Jewish-Roman War. It is very likely that these Jews founded communities on the territory of present-day Tunisia.

A traditional account of the history of the descendants of the first Jewish settlers states that their ancestors settled in that part of North Africa long before the destruction of the First Temple in the 6th century BCE. After the fall of the Second Temple, many exiled Jews settled in Tunis and engaged in agriculture, cattle-raising, and trade. They were divided into clans which were governed by their respective heads (mokdem), and they had to pay the Romans a capitation tax of 2 shekels. Under the dominion of the Romans and (after 429) of the fairly tolerant Vandals, the Jews of Tunis increased and prospered to such a degree that early African church councils deemed it necessary to enact restrictive laws against them.

Al-Qayrawani wrote that at the time of the conquest of Hippo Zaritus (present-day Bizerte) by Hasan ibn al-Nu'man in 698, the governor of that district was a Jew. When Tunis came under the dominion of the Arabs, or of the Arabian caliphate of Baghdad, another influx of Arabic-speaking Jews from the Levant into Tunis took place.

=== Under Roman rule ===
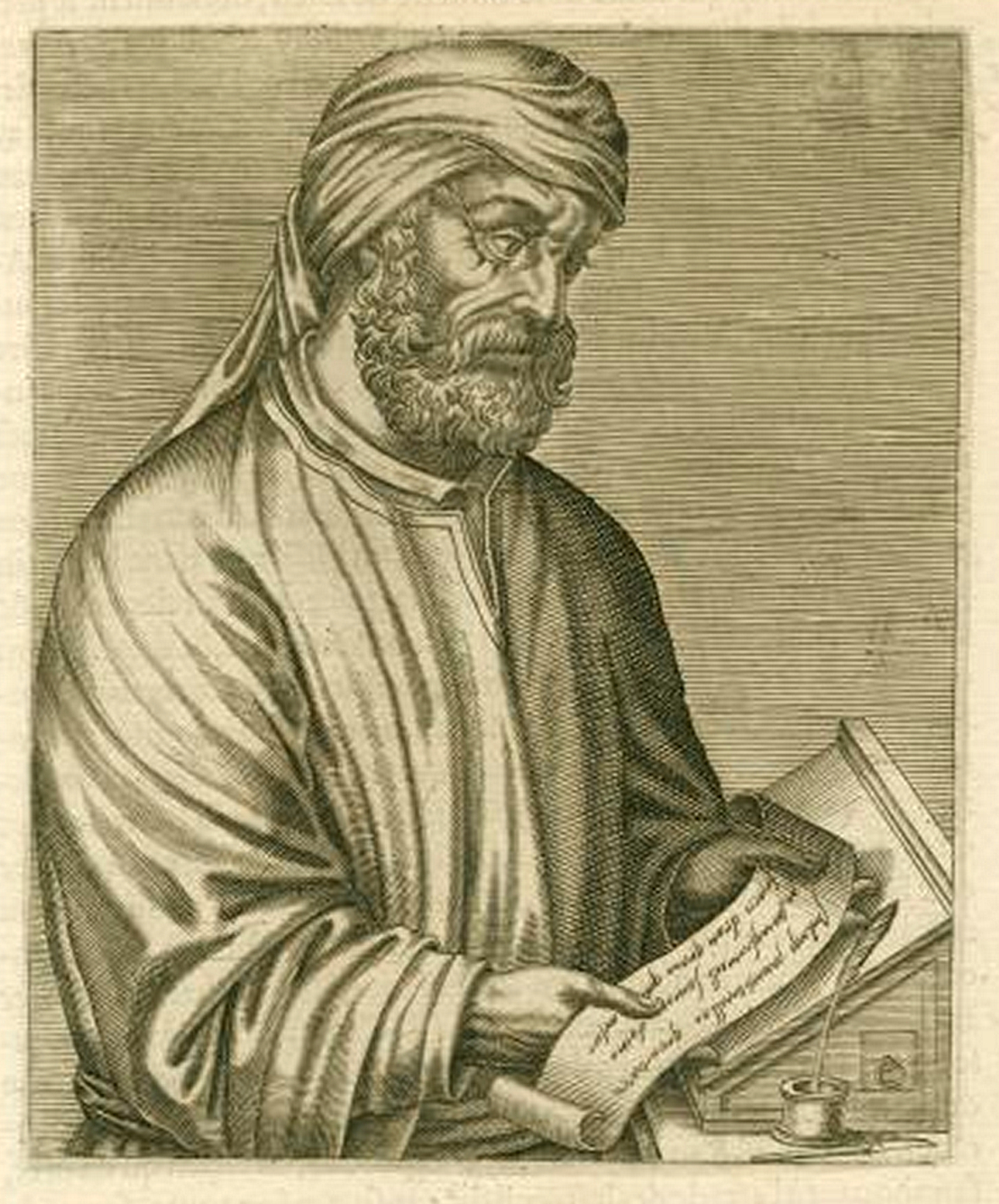
Tertullian who fought against the expansion of Judaism

The first documents attesting to the presence of Jews in Tunisia date from the second century. Tertullian describes Jewish communities alongside which Pagan Jews of Punic, Roman and Berber origin and, initially, Christians; The success of Jewish proselytism led the pagan authorities to take legal measures, while Tertullian wrote a pamphlet against Judaism at the same time. On the other hand, the Talmud mention the existence of several Carthaginian rabbis. In addition, Alfred Louis Delattre demonstrates towards the end of the nineteenth century that the Gammarth necropolis, made up of 200 rock chambers, each containing up to 17 complex tombs (kokhim), contains Jewish symbols and funerary inscriptions in Hebrew, Latin and Greek.

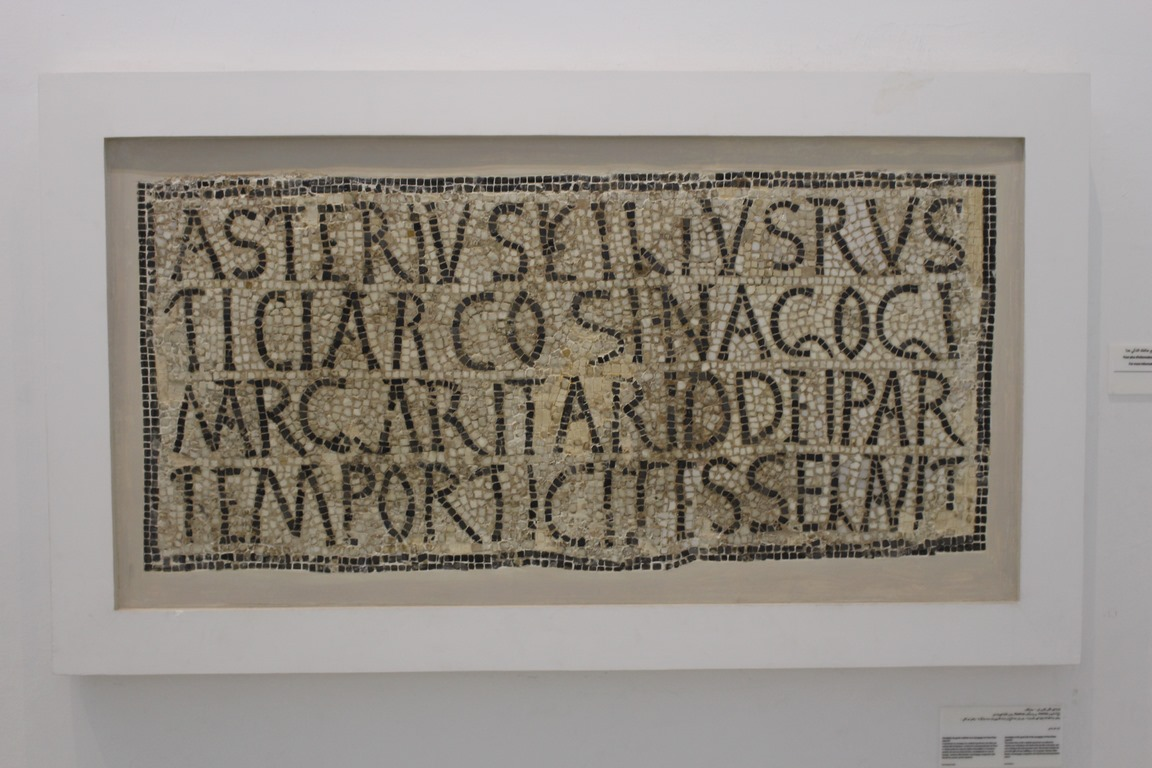
"Sinagoga", Roman mosaic, Bardo Museum, Tunisia.

The Jewish community of Carthage was very pious, adhering strictly to traditions, eating kosher, and consuming matzah during Passover. They observed Yom Kippur, gathering outdoors to await the end of the fast. The community celebrated Shabbat with festive meals prepared on Friday evening, lighting a lamp, and holding public Torah readings at the synagogue. They also practiced frequent ritual ablutions. A distinctive feature of Jewish women in Carthage was covering their heads.

Tertullian further maintains that Jewish worship was protected by Roman law. While a tax served as a reminder of Roman authority in the region, he suggests that the community was granted a certain level of autonomy for daily affairs: alongside the archisynagogue, the spiritual leader, there was the Archon, a kind of council of elders. For reasons likely both political—Jews were Roman citizens—and proselytizing among local populations, Latin was the predominant language in inscriptions, while Hebrew appeared only in a few phrases, such as greetings (e.g., Shalom).

"Judaism, in Carthage as elsewhere, exerted a great influence on local populations: crowds gathered for the Saturday sermon, and pagans and Christians sometimes observed the Shabbat and other festivals and conversions were widespread". Despite some controversies, rivalries, or mockery between Jews and Christians, it appears that Christians (or Judeo-Christians) were accepted in the Jewish cemetery of Gammarth, a necropolis discovered in the late 19th century. The decoration of necropolises and magical tablets, which combine pagan abjurations with sacred Jewish formulas, illustrate the syncretism of the time. The success of Jewish proselytism thus prompted the pagan Roman authorities to take legal measures.

The ruins of an ancient synagogue dating back to the 3rd–5th century CE was discovered by the French captain Ernest De Prudhomme in his Hammam-Lif residence in 1883 called in Latin as sancta synagoga naronitana ("holy synagogue of Naro") and motifs common across Roman Africa, attests to the affluence of its Israelite members and the quality of their interactions with other populations. Another synagogue, dating to the 5th century, was discovered in Clipea (modern-day Kélibia). Other Jewish communities are attested by epigraphic or literary references to Utique, Chemtou, Hadrumète or Thusuros (present Tozeur). As elsewhere in the Roman Empire, the Jews of Roman Africa were romanized after hundreds of years of subjection and would have adopted Latinized names, worn togas, and spoken Latin.

According to St. Augustine, only their morals, modeled by Jewish religious precepts (circumcision, kashrut, observance of Shabbat, modesty of dress), distinguished them from the rest of the population. Some devoted themselves to translation for Christian clients and to the study of the Law; many rabbis were originally from Carthage. Others worked in agriculture, livestock and trade.

Their situation was modified by the Edict of Milan (313), which legalized Christianity. Jews were gradually excluded from most public functions and proselytism was severely punished. The construction of new synagogues was prohibited towards the end of the fourth century, and by the fifth century even the upkeep of existing ones was subject by law to the approval of the imperial administration. Access to civil service positions was also restricted, and it was prohibited to disinherit Jewish children who converted to Christianity, circumcise them, or even own Christian slaves.

However, various councils held by the Church of Carthage, in advising Christians not to follow certain practices of their Jewish neighbors, serve as testimony as to their ongoing influence.

=== From Vandal peace to Byzantine repression ===
The arrival of the Vandals at the beginning of the 5th century marked a period of respite for the Jews, since the Arianism of the new rulers of Roman Africa was closer to Jewish monotheism than the Catholicism of the Church Fathers. Jews likely prospered economically and supported the Vandal kings against the armies of Emperor Justinian, who sought to reconquer North Africa.

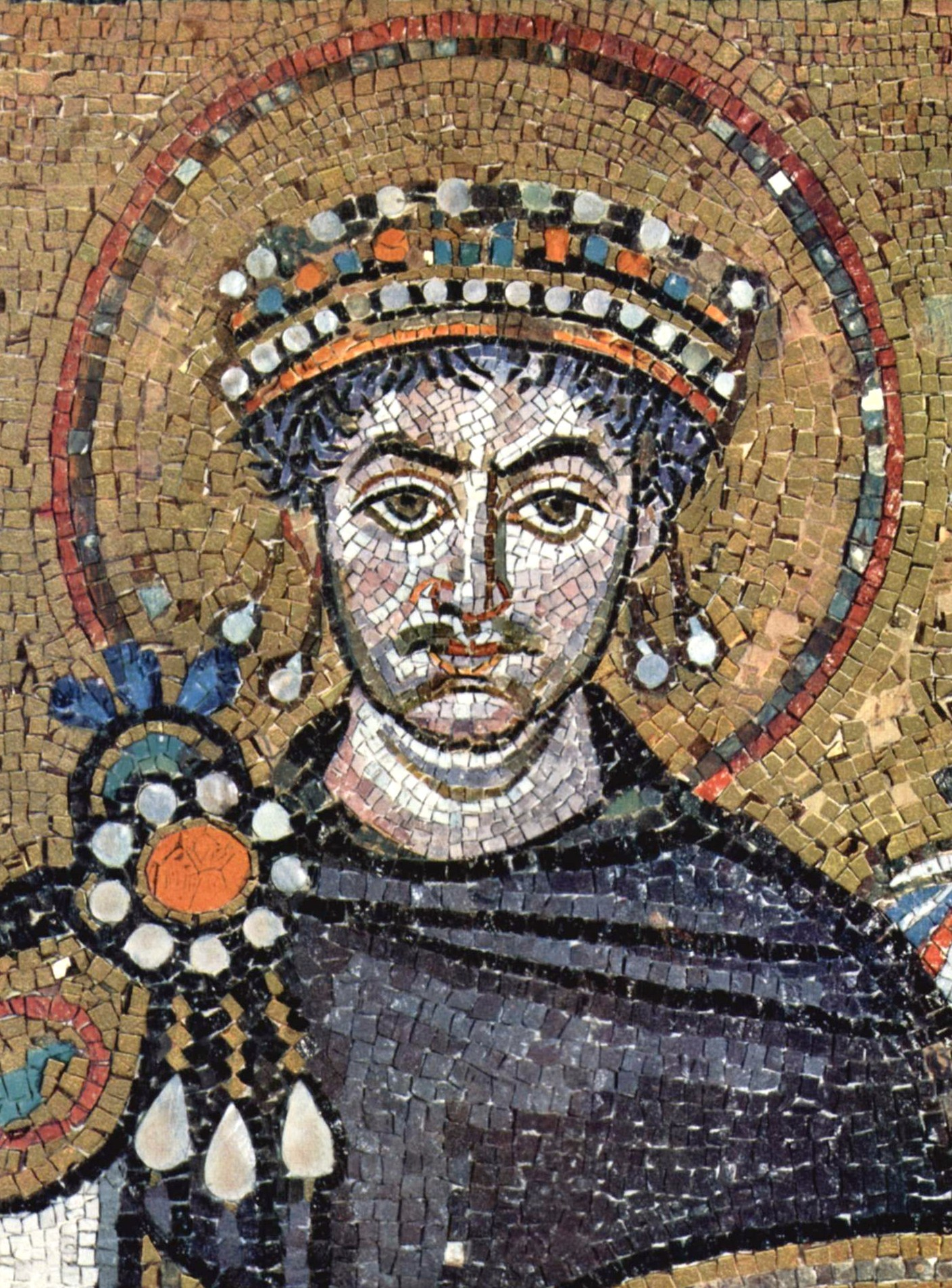
Justinian, a Nicene Christian emperor of the Byzantine Empire, launched severe repression against the Jews in the 6th century.

Justinian's victory in 535 began the period of the Exarchate of Carthage, which favored Nicene Christianity and persecuted Jews, Arians, Donatists, and pagans. Jews were once again stigmatized and excluded from public office. Jewish synagogues and pagan temples were converted into churches, their worship banned, and their gatherings prohibited. The administration strictly enforced the Theodosian Code against them, leading to forced conversions. Although Emperor Maurice attempted to repeal these measures, his successors reinstated them, culminating in an imperial edict mandating baptism.

Some Jews reportedly fled cities under Eastern Roman control to settle in mountain regions or oases at the edge of the desert. There, with the support of Berber tribes, they resisted Roman rule, converting many Berbers to Judaism through proselytism. However, it is possible that the Judaization of the Berbers occurred four centuries earlier, following the arrival of Jews fleeing the repression of the revolt in Cyrenaica. This transition may have happened gradually through a syncretism of Jewish and pagan practices, including the worship of Tanit, which persisted after the fall of Carthage. This supports the legend of the Judeo-Berber queen of the Aurès Mountains, Kahina, who resisted the Islamization of the Maghreb. Regardless of the hypothesis, the 14th-century historian Ibn Khaldun confirmed their existence on the eve of the Muslim conquest of the Maghreb based on 11th-century Arab chronicles. However, this version is heavily contested: Haïm Zeev Hirschberg notes that Ibn Khaldun wrote his work centuries after the events, and Mohamed Talbi points out that the French translation is not entirely accurate, as it fails to convey Ibn Khaldun's sense of possibility. Gabriel Camps also asserts that the Djerawa and Nefzaouas mentioned were Christians allied with the Eastern Romans before the advent of Islam.

Regardless, while the hypothesis of mass tribal conversion to Judaism seems fragile, individual conversions appear more likely.

== Middle Ages ==
=== New status of Jews under Islam ===
With the Arab conquest and the arrival of Islam in Tunisia in the eighth century, the "People of the Book" (including Jews and Christians) were given a choice between conversion to Islam (which some Jewish Berbers have done) and legal status as dhimmi. The dhimmi is a term for non-Muslims, originally Jews and Christians as People of the Book, who live in an Islamic state and refers to the state's obligation to protect the lives of these communities as well as their freedom of religion and right to administer their own laws in certain regards (i.e. the Jewish halakhic courts), in return for the payment of the jizya, the poll tax. As well as several obligation and restrictions as refraining from building new places of worship. In addition, dhimmis were forbidden to engage in proselytism and could not marry Muslim women, although the reverse was permitted if the Jewish or Christian wife converted to Islam. Finally, dhimmi individuals were required to treat Muslims and Islam with respect and humility. Any violation of this pact could result in expulsion or even death.

=== Cultural heyday of Tunisian Jews (9th to 11th centuries) ===
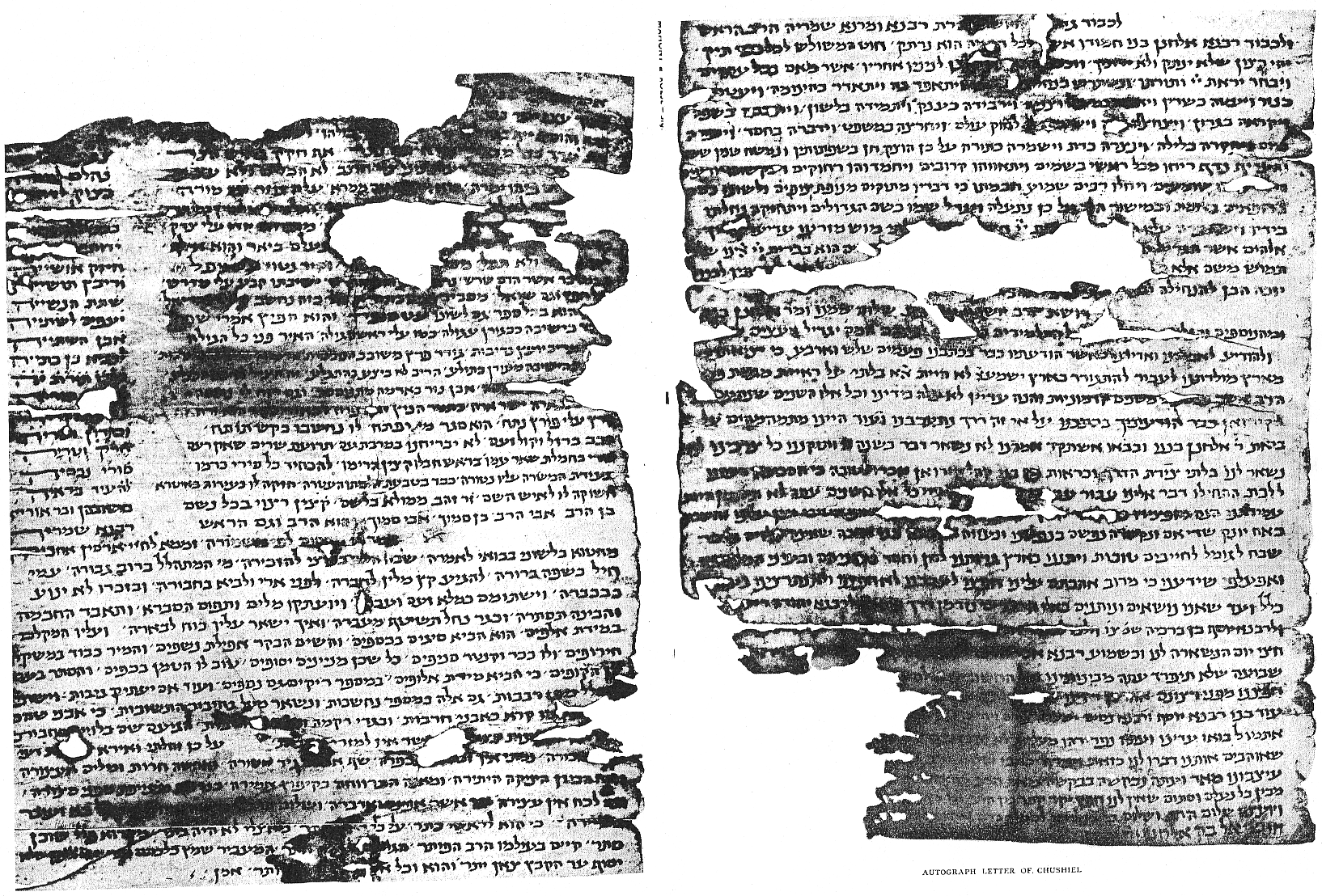
Letter from Houshiel ben Elhanan reproduced in the Jewish Quarterly Review (1899)

The living conditions of the Jews in Tunisia were relatively favorable during the reign of the Aghlabids and then Fatimid dynasties. Of the three principal Jewish communities that came into prominence by the 10th century, Ifriqiya (modern-day Tunisia) was the first to flourish, beginning with the establishment of the Shi'ite caliphate of the Fatimids in 909. The Fatimids, in general, were more tolerant towards dhimmi subjects than interpretations in orthodox Sunni Islam. Jews were employed in the civil service, sumptuary laws for non-Muslims were repealed, and the discriminatory tariffs were not imposed.

Jews worked in the service of the dynasty, as treasurers, doctors, or tax collectors but their situation remained precarious. Kairouan (Qayrawan), now the capital of the Aghlabids, was the seat of the most important community in the territory, attracting migrants from Umayyad Spain, Italy, and the Abbasid Empire. This community would become one of the major poles of Judaism between the ninth and eleventh centuries, both economically, culturally and intellectually, ensuring, through correspondence with the Talmudic academies in Babylonia. The Kairouan community became an important intermediary between communities in Spain and the Geonim of the Babylonian academies.

Many major figures of Judaism are associated with the city. Among them is Isaac Israeli ben Solomon, a private doctor of the Aghlabide Ziadet Allah III and then of the Fatimids Abdullah al-Mahdi Billah and Al-Qa'im bi-Amr Allah and author of various medical treatises in Arabic which would enrich the medieval medicine through their translation by Constantine the African, adapting the teachings of the Alexandrian school to the Jewish dogma. Israeli's works in Arabic were studied in their Hebrew and Latin translations in both medieval and Renaissance Europe. Dunash ibn Tamim, his disciple, was the author (or final editor) wrote, along other works, a philosophical commentary on the Sefer Yetzirah, where he developed conceptions close to his master's thought. Another disciple, Ishaq ibn Imran is considered the founder of the philosophical and medical school of Ifriqiya.

Jacob ben Nissim ibn Shahin, rector of the Center of Studies at the end of the tenth century, is the official representative of the Talmudic academies of Babylonia, acting as intermediaries between them and his own community. Jacob ibn Shahin was succeeded by his son, Nissim ben Jacob, considered the greatest of the Qayrawan sages. Another academy was founded by Chushiel ben Elchanan, originally from Bari, developed the simultaneous study of the Talmud of Babylon and the Jerusalem Talmud. His son and disciple Chananel ben Chushiel was one of the major commentators of the Talmud in the Middle Ages. After his death, his work was continued by another disciple of his father whom Ignác Goldziher calls Jewish mutazilite: Nissim ben Jacob, the only one among the sages of Kairouan to bear the title of Gaon, also wrote an important commentary on the Talmud and the Hibbour Yafe Mehayeshoua, which is perhaps the first tales collection in Jewish literature.

On the political level, the community emancipated itself from the exile of Baghdad at the beginning of the eleventh century and acquired its first secular chief. Each community was placed under the authority of a council of notables headed by a chief (naggid) who, through the faithful, disposes of the resources necessary for the proper functioning of the various institutions: worship, schools, a tribunal headed by the rabbi-judge (dayan), etc. The maggid of Kairouan undoubtedly had the ascendancy over those of the communities of smaller size.

The Jews participate greatly in the exchanges with Al-Andalus, Egypt, and the broader Middle East. Grouped in separate quarters (although many Jews settled in the Muslim districts of Kairouan during the Fatimid period), they had house of prayer, schools and a court. The port cities of Mahdia, Sousse, Sfax and Gabès saw a steady influx of Jewish immigrants from the Levant to the end of the eleventh century, and their communities participated in these economic and intellectual exchanges. Monopolizing the goldsmiths' and jewelers' crafts, they also worked in the textile industry, as tailors, tanners and shoemakers, while the smallest rural communities practiced agriculture (saffron, henna, vine, etc.) or breeding of nomadic animals.

Nevertheless, the attitude of Islamic authorities regarding ghiyār (differentiation of non-Muslims from Muslims) begun to harden and in the late ninth century the Aghlabid ruler but also Maliki qadi of Kairuoan issued decrees that ordered dhimmis to wear a white patch on the shoulder of their garment. The patch for Jews had the image of an ape, an image based on Quranic interpretation that became standard in anti-dhimmi propaganda and was polemic when referring to Jews. It is not clear how long these humiliating decrees remained in force, but it is clear that the purpose of the patch was not merely ghiyār, but also dhull (humiliation) in keeping with the Quranic injunction (Sura 9:29) that non-Muslims should be humbled.

The departure of the Fatimids to Egypt in 972 led their Zirid vassals to seize power and eventually break their bonds of political and religious submission in the middle of the eleventh century. The Banu Hilal and the Banu Sulaym, were sent in retaliation against Tunisia by the Fatimids, took Kairouan in 1057 and plundered it. Combined with the triumph of Sunnism and the end of the Babylonian gaonate, these events marked the end of the Kairouan community and reversed the migratory flow of the Jewish populations towards the Levant, with the elites having already accompanied the Fatimid court in Cairo. Jews migrated to the coastal cities of Gabes, Sfax, Mahdia, Sousse and Tunis, but also to Béjaïa, Tlemcen and Beni Hammad Fort.

=== Persecution and decline under Almohad rule (12th–13th centuries) ===
The conquest of Tunisia by the Almohad Caliphate in the 1150s proved disastrous to the Jews of Tunis. The city itself was captured in 1159 after refusing to surrender. The rise of the Almohad Caliphate shook both the Jewish communities of Tunisia and the Muslims attached to the cult of the saints, declared by the new sovereigns as heretics. Jews were forced to apostasy, flight, or death by Caliph Abd al-Mu'min. Abd al-Mu'min's harsh treatment of the residents of Tunis asked as a deterrent to the rulers of other provincial towns. In addition to forcing Christians and Jews to convert or die, half the property of all Muslims in Tunis was confiscated by the Almohad treasury. Many massacres took place, despite many formal conversions by the pronunciation of the Shahada. Indeed, many Jews, while outwardly professing Islam, remained faithful to their religion, which they observed in secret, as advocated by Rabbi Moses ben Maimon. Jewish practices disappeared from the Maghreb from 1165 to 1230. Still they were saddened by the sincere adherence of some to Islam, fears of persecution and the relativization of any religious affiliation. This Islamization of the morals and doctrines of the Jews of Tunisia, meant they as 'dhimmis' (after the disappearance of Christianity in the Maghreb around 1150) isolated from their other coreligionists, and was strongly criticized by the Maimonides.

The first Almohad, 'Abd al-Mu'min, claimed that Muhammad had permitted the Jews free exercise of their religion for only five hundred years, and had declared that if, after that period, the messiah had not come, they were to be forced to embrace Islam. Accordingly, Jews as well as Christians were compelled either to embrace Islam or to leave the country. 'Abd al-Mu'min's successors pursued the same course, and their severe measures resulted either in emigration or in forcible conversions. Soon becoming suspicious of the sincerity of the new converts, the Almohadis compelled them to wear a special garb, with a yellow cloth for a head-covering.

Throughout this, Jewish communities in Tunisia maintained connections throughout and beyond the Maghreb, particularly those in the Italian peninsula. Both a genizah fragment from the 1220s and two letters in 1227 to the mayor of Pisa attest to the presence of commercial relations between the Jewish communities in Tunis and Pisa. In 1267, a man named Moses of Tunis served as an Arabic interpreter to Genoese traders living in the city. These connections persisted for many years; surviving records include a treaty between Florence and Tunis translated by a Jew named Abraham in 1421, translated from Arabic to Italian. Other Jewish diplomats, translators, and court functionaries travelled between Tunis and city-states and kingdoms including Aragon, Majorca, and Barcelona into the 15th century.

=== Under the Hafsids, Spanish and Ottomans (1236–1603) ===
Under the Hafsid dynasty, which was established in 1236 as a breakaway from the Almohad dynasty, the condition of the Jews improved. Jews could again practice their religion and thus reconstituted the communities that existed before the Almohad period. Systematic persecution, social exclusion and hindrance to worship disappeared, but the dhimma was strict, especially in matters of dress. The Hafsids followed late Almohad practice and forced the Jews, who were the only non-Muslim religionists left, to wear yellow turban and garments and caliph Muhammad I al-Mustansir renewed these regulations in 1250. The yellow patch Tunisian Jews wore from this time until the nineteenth century became so emblematic that they became commonly referred to as shikliyyun.

Besides Kairouan, there were at that time important communities in Mehdia, Kalaa, the island of Djerba, and the city of Tunis. Considered at first as foreigners, the Jews were not permitted to settle in the interior of Tunis, but had to live in a building called a funduq. Subsequently, however, a wealthy and humane Muslim, Sidi Mahrez, who in 1159 had rendered great services to the Almohad caliph Abd al-Mu'min, obtained for them the right to settle in a special quarter of the city. This quarter, called the "Hara," constituted until 1857 the ghetto of Tunis; it was closed at night. In 1270, in consequence of the defeat of Louis IX of France, who had undertaken a crusade against Tunis, the cities of Kairouan and Ḥammat were declared holy; and the Jews were required either to leave them or to convert to Islam. From that year until the conquest of Tunis by France (1857), Jews and Christians were forbidden to pass a night in either of these cities; and only by special permission of the governor were they allowed to enter them during the day.

Although the difficulty of the economic context leads to a surge of probabilism, the triumph of Maliki Sunnism with little tolerance towards the "people of the book" meant material and spiritual misery. The massive settlement of Jewish-Spanish scholars fleeing from the Castile in 1391 and again in 1492 was mainly carried out in Algeria and Morocco, and the Tunisian Jews, abandoned by this phenomenon, were led to consult Algerian scholars such as Simeon ben Zemah Duran.

In 1360, a treaty was declared between Abu Ishaq Ibrahim II and Peter IV of Aragon; the treaty included repeated mentions of both Christian and Jewish subjects, as well as guarantees of safety on roads and protection against bandits. Another article of the treaty started that no Tunisian Jew or Muslim was to be arrested in Aragon after the treaty had been concluded and, if any such prisoners were found, they were to be released. Possibly in response to the increasing Jewish participation in trade, the population of the Jewish community in Tunisia increased in the 14th century. According to a letter addressed to Simeon ben Zemah Duran, the influx of new settlers into Tunis had overwhelmed the capacity of the old synagogue in the funduq. The pogroms of 1391 drove still move Jewish refugees from Catalonia and Mallorca to Tunisia (and Algeria), further increasing the population.

In the fifteenth century, each community was autonomous – recognized by power from the moment it counts at least ten major men – and has its own institutions; Their communal affairs were directed by a chief (zaken ha-yehudim) nominated by the government, and assisted by a council of notables (gdolei ha-qahal) made up of the most educated and wealthy family heads. The chief's functions consisted in the administration of justice among the Jews and collection of Jewish taxes.

Three kinds of taxes were imposed on Tunisian Jews:

1. a communal tax, to which every member contributed according to his means;
2. a personal or capitation tax (the jizya);
3. a general tax, which was levied upon the Muslims also.

In addition to these, every Jewish tradesman and industrialist had to pay an annual tax to the guild. After the 13th century, taxes were collected by a qaid, who also served as an intermediary between the government and the Jews. His authority within the Jewish community was supreme. The members of the council of elders, as well as the rabbis, were nominated at his recommendation, and no rabbinical decision was valid unless approved by him.

Jewish communities of Tunis under the Ottoman Empire

During the conquest of Tunis by the Spaniards in 1535, many Jews were made prisoners and sold as slaves in several Christian countries. After the victory of the Ottomans over the Spaniards in 1574, Tunisia became a province (pashalik) of the Ottoman Empire under Koca Sinan Pasha.

During the Spanish occupation of the Tunisian coasts (1535–74) the Jewish communities of Bizerte, Susa, Sfax, and other seaports suffered greatly at the hands of the conquerors; while under the subsequent Turkish rule the Jews of Tunis enjoyed a fair amount of security. They were free to practice their religion and administer their own affairs. Nevertheless, they were subject to the caprices of princes and outbursts of fanaticism. Petty officials were allowed to impose upon them the most difficult drudgery without compensation. They were obliged to wear a special costume, consisting of a blue frock without collar or ordinary sleeves (loose linen sleeves being substituted), wide linen drawers, black slippers, and a small black skull-cap; stockings might be worn in winter only. They might ride only on asses or mules, and were not permitted to use a saddle.

== Beginning of the Modern Era ==
From the 16th century Tunisia and more particularly Tunis had an influx of Sephardi Jewish families, who initially settled in Livorno (Tuscany, Italy), and who later moved to work in other trading centers. These new settlers, called granas in Arabic or gorneyim (Hebrew: גורנים) in Hebrew after the name of the city in both languages, were wealthier than the Jewish natives called tuansa. They spoke and wrote in Italian but gradually adopted the local Arabic while introducing their traditional liturgy to their new host country. According to a 1710 agreement, the Grana were considered Italian citizens; only the Tuansa were subject to the dhimmi restrictions.

=== Under the Muradids and Husainids (1603–1857) ===
From the beginning of the 18th century the political status of the Jews in Tunis improved. This was due to the increasing influence of the political agents of the European powers, who, while seeking to ameliorate the condition of the Christian residents, had to plead also the cause of the Jews, whom Muslim legislation classed with Christians. Haim Joseph David Azulai, who visited Tunis in 1772, praised this development. In 1819, the United States consul in Tunis, Mordecai Manuel Noah, gave the following account of the situation of the Tunisian Jews:

With all the apparent oppression, the Jews are the leading men; they are in Barbary the principal mechanics, they are at the head of the custom-house, they farm the revenues; the exportation of various articles, and the monopoly of various merchandise, are secured to them by purchase, they control the mint and regulate the coinage of money, they keep the bey's jewels and valuable articles, and are his treasurers, secretaries, and interpreters; the little known of arts, science, and medicine is confined to the Jews. If a Jew commits a crime, if the punishment affects his life, these people, so national, always purchase his pardon; the disgrace of one affects the whole community; they are ever in the presence of the bey, every minister has two or three Jewish agents, and when they unite to attain an object, it cannot be prevented. These people, then, whatever may be said of their oppression, possess a very controlling influence, their friendship is worthy of being preserved by public functionaries, and their opposition is to be dreaded.

==== Granas and Tuansa ====
From the early 17th century, Marrano families who had re-embraced Judaism after settling in Livorno at the end of the 15th century left Tuscany to settle in Tunisia as part of the establishment of trade relations. These new arrivals, called Granas in Arabic and Gorneyim (גורנים) in Hebrew, were wealthier and fewer in number than their indigenous coreligionists, known as Twansa. They spoke and wrote Tuscan, and sometimes still Spanish, forming a highly influential economic and cultural elite within the broader Italian community. Their surnames reflect their Spanish or Portuguese origins.

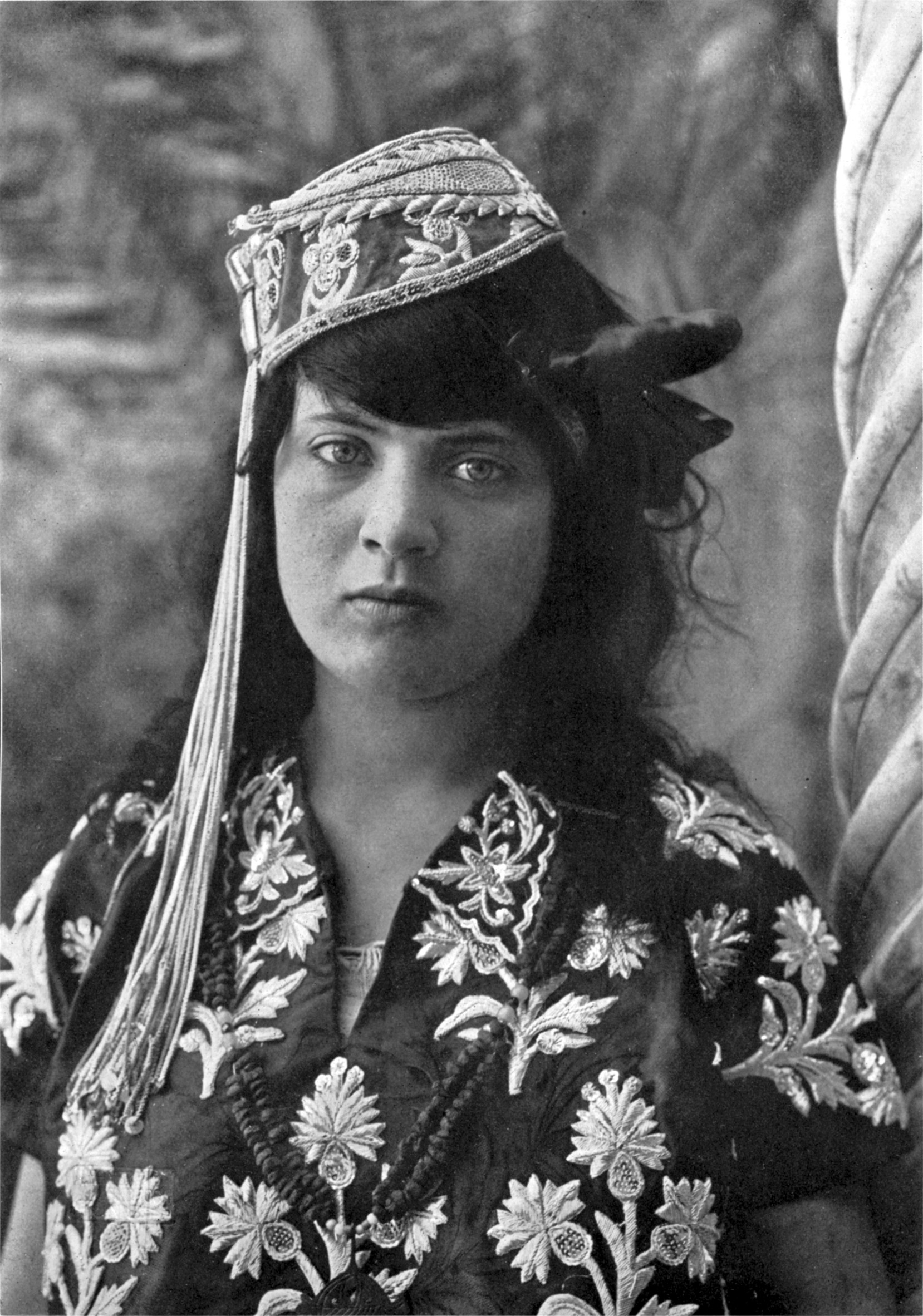
Tunisian Jewish woman in ceremonial attire (1908).

Quickly introduced to the Beylic Court, they performed executive functions of court – collectors of taxes, treasurers and intermediaries without authority over – and noble professions in medicine, finance or diplomacy. Even if they settled in the same neighborhoods, they had virtually no connection with the Tuansa, to which Jews from the rest of the Mediterranean Basin have assimilated. The Tuansa spoke the Judeo-Tunisian dialect, and occupied a modest social position. This is why, contrary to what was happening elsewhere in the Maghreb, these new populations were hardly accepted, which gradually leads to the division of the Jewish community into two groups.

In this context, the Jews played a major role in the economic life of the country, in commerce and crafts, but also in trading and banking. Despite the tariffs being higher than those paid by Muslim or Christian traders (10% vs. 3%), the Granas managed to control and prosper trade with Livorno. Their trading houses also engaged in credit banking activities and participated in the purchase of Christian slaves captured by privateers and resold. The Tuansa saw themselves conceding the monopoly of the leather trade by the Muradid and then Husainid beys. Jews who were traveling as Tunisians worked in the retail trade in the souks of Tunis, thus shipping imported products from Europe under the leadership of a Muslim amine, or in the Jewish quarter.

In 1710, a century of friction between the two groups led to a coup de force of the Livornese community, with a tacit agreement of the authorities. By creating its own community institutions, it creates a schism with the indigenous population. Each of them had their council of notables, their grand rabbi, their rabbinical court, synagogues, schools, butcher's shop and a separate cemetery. This state of affairs was endorsed by a takkanah (rabbinic decree) signed in July 1741 between the great rabbis Abraham Taïeb and Isaac Lumbroso. This agreement was renewed in 1784 before being annulled in 1899. This takkanah sets, among other rules, the fact that every Israelite from a Muslim country was attached to the Tuansa, while every Israelite from a Christian country was from the Granas. Moreover, the Granas – a richer community, although only 8% of the total population – then accounted for one third of the payment of the jizya against two-thirds for the Tuansa. This last point indicated that the Livornese community, previously protected by the European consuls, has sufficiently integrated into Tunisia so that its members were considered dhimmis and taxed like the Tuansa.

The socio-cultural and economic differences between these two communities have increased in the nineteenth century. The Granas, due to their European origins and higher standard of living, but also to their economic, family and cultural ties with Livorno, found it difficult to cope with their indigenous coreligionists, the Tuansa, who were considered less "civilized". The Granas were an important contributions whereas they represented only a minority of the Jews of Tunisia. On the other hand, indigenous elites didn't wish to give up their power to newcomers, unlike their Maghreb neighbors, probably due to the later arrival of the Granas in Tunisia. The Granas also differed geographically from the Tuansa, settling in the European district of Tunis, thus avoiding the Hara, and more culturally approach the Europeans than their co-religionists. However, the two groups keep the same rites and uses with only a few variants and, outside Tunis, the same community institutions continue to serve all the faithful. Moreover, all the Jews remain under the authority of a single qaid chosen from the Tuansa, presumably to avoid interference with foreigners.

==== Harassment and discrimination ====
During the seventeenth and eighteenth centuries, Jews were still subjected to harassing and discriminatory measures, particularly on the part of the judicial system which was arbitrary in their regard, with the exception of the more tolerant Hanafi courts. Jews were still subjected to the collective payment of the jizya – the annual amount of which varied according to the year, from 10,332 piastres in 1756 to 4,572 piastres in 1806 – and had to pay additional taxes (ghrâma) whenever the sovereign's treasury was in difficulty, as the Muslims sometimes did. Moreover, they were periodically obliged to carry out public works and were subjected to forced labor which affected mainly the poorest of the communities. Regarding dress code, the chechia that served as their headdress had to be black and wrapped in a dark turban, unlike the Muslims who wore a red chechia surrounded by a white turban. The Granas, dressed in European fashion, wore wigs and round hats like Christian merchants.

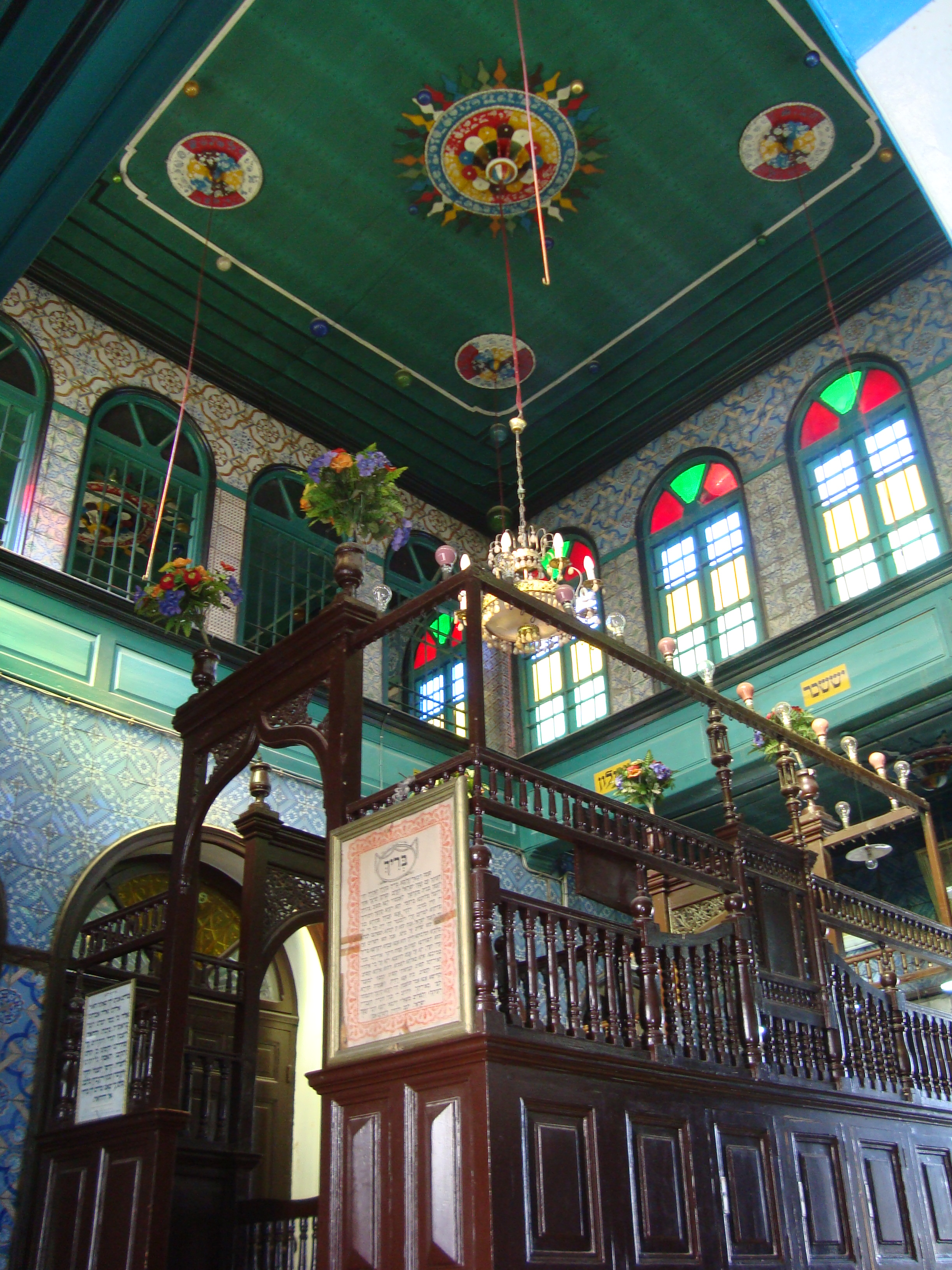
El Ghriba Synagogue in Djerba.

At the beginning of the eighteenth century, the political status of the Jews improved somewhat thanks to the growing influence of the political agents of the European powers who, seeking to improve the living conditions of the Christian residents, also pleaded the Jews. But if the wealthy Jews – who held positions in administration or trade – succeeded in being respected, especially through the protection of influential Muslim personalities, poor Jews were often victims of bullying and even murder, and the authorities didn't seem to intervene. An observer declared that the Jews were recognized "not only in their black costume, but also in the imprint of a curse they carry on their foreheads".

However, despite this difficult climate, Jews were not subjected to outbreaks of religious fanaticism or racism leading to massacres. Although looting accompanied by violence was occasionally reported, it always occurred in the context of unrest affecting the broader population, such as in June 1752 and September 1756 in Tunis. Furthermore, there were no instances of mass expulsions, and Jews enjoyed an almost complete freedom of religion — often involving their Muslim neighbors in their celebrations — in contrast to the practices in Europe at the time.

At the end of the eighteenth century, Hammouda Pasha denied Jews the right to acquire and possess real estate properties, while the learning of literal Arabic and the use of the Arabic alphabet was also prohibited during this period. Finally, the behavior of the Muslim population towards the communities varied from the will to rigorous application of the dhimma by the Ulama to the absence of hostility of the rural population, marginalized urban fringes but assured of impunity.

=== Internal split and development ===
==== Leaders ====
Communities were structured under the authority of a leader of the "Jewish nation" with the title of hasar ve ha-tafsar, a prestigious and powerful post containing both the qaid charge of the Jews (qdyd el yihud) and that of Receiver General of Finance under the authority of the Treasurer of the Kingdom (khaznadar). He was an intermediary between the bey and his community and therefore enjoyed entry to the court. He had a very important bureaucratic power over those co-religionaries in whom he apportioned the payment of the jizya – of which they were collectively liable – according to the resources of each household. It also refers to those who performed the duties imposed by the authorities.

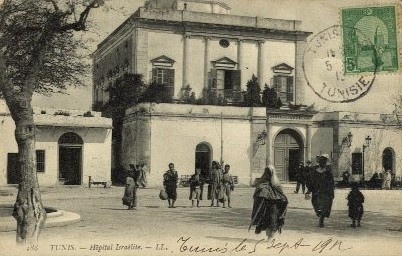
Tunis Jewish Hospital (1912).

A state farmer, surrounded by some of the most fortunate and educated notables, also collected taxes such as the tithes, the tax on kosher meat and the offerings of the faithful. These allow him to pay for his services, those of his deputies and the rabbis-judges and finance the synagogues, the schools linked to them, the ritual abattoir, the cemetery, the relief fund for the needy and the sick and the rabbinical court, which were only in large cities under the presidency of the Grand Rabbi. Administrator of the affairs of the community designated the local secular or religious leaders – with the written approval of the Tunisian authorities – and gives them broad orientations. From the reign of Abu l-Hasan Ali I (1735–1756), he also served as treasurer of the Bey and many of the key posts in the administration of finance – collection of taxes and customs duties, scheduling of expenditure, handling of cash, keeping books of account or paying the salaries of the Janissaries – were occupied by Jewish agents.

==== Religious authorities ====
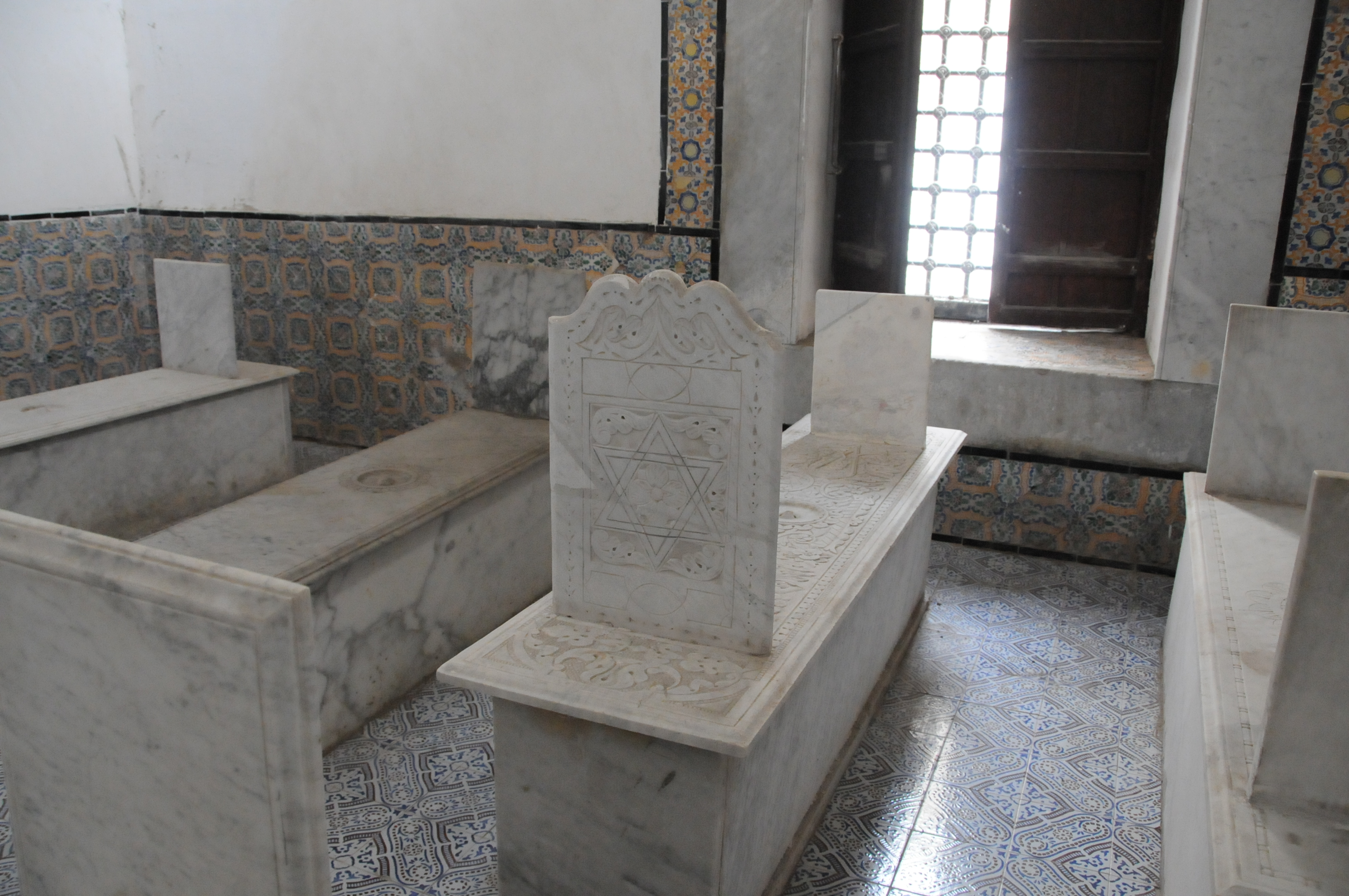
Jewish tomb in the royal mausoleum of the Tourbet el Bey

Despite the split between the groups, the figure of the Grand Rabbi had considerable authority among his followers. By virtue of his function as president of the rabbinical court, he watches over Jewish law, relying on the Shulchan Aruch, the standard legislative code, and the Talmud. The rabbinic jurisdictions deal with personal status matters, but also with civil and commercial cases when only Jews were concerned, whether the faults were religious or secular. In small towns, the dayan was responsible for rendering justice, with the rabbinical court serving as a chamber of appeal. One of the most rigorous penalties that the latter could pronounce was the herem, the Jewish version of excommunication, made public in the synagogue.

However, some questioned the authority of the religious leaders: a Jewish broker, working for a French trading house and condemned to beating in May 1827 for invoking the name of God, appealed the decision to the consul of France. Following the protest of the latter to the bey, it was decided that the rabbinical court would no longer pronounce sentence for religious offense to a Jew placed under French protection.

==== Renewal of ideas ====
On the intellectual level, the growing exchanges between Jews from Tunisia and Livorno facilitated the circulation of printed works in Tuscany and their widespread distribution in Tunisia and the rest of the Maghreb. This led to an important revival of the Tunisian Hebrew studies at the beginning of the eighteenth century, embodied in particular by the rabbis Semah Sarfati, Abraham Ha-Cohen, Abraham Benmoussa, Abraham Taïeb and Joseph Cohen-Tanugi. Among the works of the Chumash, the Talmud, or the Kabbalah of note include:

- Toafot Re'em (1761–1762) and Meira Dakhiya (1792) by Mordecai Baruch Carvalho, commentary on the work of Elijah Mizrachi and a collection of glosses on various Talmudic treatises;
- Zera Itshak (1768) by Isaac Lumbroso, an important Talmudic commentary;
- Hoq Nathan (1776) by Nathan Borgel, an important Talmudic commentary;
- Migdanot Nathan (1778–1785) by Élie Borgel, series of commentaries on Talmudic treatises;
- Yeter ha-Baz (1787) by Nehorai Jarmon, new on the Talmud and the Mishneh Torah of Moses Maimonides
- Erekh ha-Shoulhan (1791–1891) by Isaac Taïeb, a book dealing with the laws and commenting on the Shulchan Aruch
- Mishha di-Ributa (1805) by Messaoud-Raphael El-Fassi, an important commentary by Choulhan Aroukh, accompanied by works by his sons Haym and Solomon;
- Mishkenot ha-Roim (1860) and Hayyim va-Chesed (1873) by Ouziel El-Haik, a collection of 1,499 responses on the most diverse subjects and a collection of homilies and funeral eulogies pronounced from 1767 to 1810.

With the exception of Isaac Lumbroso's Zera Itshak, all the works were printed in Livorno, Tunis, which didn't have a well-known printing press, the only attempt to make one was in 1768 was considered a failure because of the lack of knowledge on the subject. Rabbi Chaim Yosef David Azulai, who visited Tunis in 1773–74, noted that the city had some 300 young talmudists and considered that the rabbis he met "had very extensive knowledge".

Jewish-Arabic texts also celebrate legendary figures such as the poet Rabbi Fraji Chaouat, famous for his extensive Hebrew diwan, and Rabbi Yossef El Maarabi. A long poem also recounts the epidemic of plague that struck the country in the 17th century.

== Aborted reforms of the nineteenth century ==
=== Overview ===
In the mid-19th century, Tunisian Jews had few literate individuals in Arabic, and only a small number could read and write in Hebrew. Moreover, they generally adhered strictly to religious precepts due to their exclusively religious education. They had little knowledge of Arab-Muslim literature, unlike Jews in other Muslim countries. Nevertheless, interactions between Tunis and Europe contributed to a certain desire for emancipation and freedom in their assigned dress. Mahmoud Bey then decided in January 1823 to require all Jews living in Tunisia to wear a skullcap.

A Jew from Gibraltar who refused the decree was beaten. His protest to his consul triggered a strong reaction from the United Kingdom. This situation benefited the Granas, who secured the replacement of the chechia with a white skullcap (kbîbes) and a specific sefseri for their women, as a way to distinguish themselves from the Twansa, who were still required to wear black skullcaps. However, this concession contradicted a relatively strict policy adopted by the authorities during the early decades of the century, as reported by the bey's physician, Louis Franck, and the United States consul Mordecai Manuel Noah.

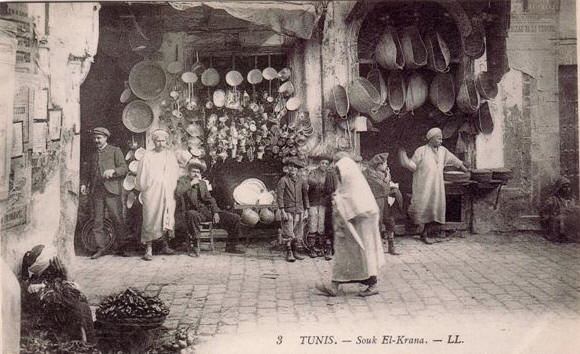
Entrance to the souk El Grana (El-Krana), where some men are dressed in European style, in the medina of Tunis (early 20th century).

In socio-economic terms, the Jewish population was highly heterogeneous. In the country's ports, European Jewish merchants, along with Christians, controlled foreign trade and dominated more than half of the commercial houses operating in the country. Alongside this affluent class of merchants and bankers, primarily Livornese, was a middle class of traders and artisans. These Jews played a significant role in retail trade, particularly in the capital, where they were heavily concentrated in two souks of the medina: one specializing in colonial goods, hardware, and items imported from Paris, and another specializing in draperies and silk fabrics from England and France. Many were also engaged in Tunisian handicrafts, such as working gold and silver, over which they held a monopoly, as well as tailoring and shoemaking. They also served as lenders to farmers and artisans. In rural areas such as Nabeul, Gabès, and Djerba, Jews worked in vine cultivation, date palm farming, fruit tree cultivation, and livestock farming.

There was also a poor class of Jews who lived off small trades and could not survive without the charity organized by their community.

=== European influences ===
The inclusion of Jews in the French Declaration of the Rights of Man and of the Citizen on September 27, 1791, and the Napoleonic decrees of 1808, fostered a certain sympathy for France among the Jews of Tunisia, who were all subjects of the bey, For instance, the Spanish chargé d'affaires reported in 1809 that "the Jews are the most fervent supporters of Napoleon." It was even reported that some Jews, including Granas following the example of their co-religionists in Italy, wore a tricolor cockade, an act harshly repressed by Hammouda Pasha, who refused any attempt by France to place its Jewish subjects originating from Tuscany, newly conquered by Napoleon I, under French protection. Napoleon had liberated the Jewish ghettos in Italy and simultaneously abolished discrimination against Jews in Italy, often similar to those in Tunisia.

In this context, article 2 of the treaty signed on July 10, 1822, with the Grand Duchy of Tuscany set the duration of the Granas’ stay in Tunisia to two years; beyond this period, they fell under the sovereignty of the bey and were considered equal to the Twansa.

==== Reforms ====
At the same time, as Tunisia gradually opened to external influences but also faced European pressures, the sovereign Ahmed I Bey initiated a policy of reforms. Under an act amending the 1822 Tunisian-Tuscan treaty, signed on November 2, 1846, the Granas who settled in Tunisia after the treaty, or those who would arrive later, were granted the right to retain their Tuscan nationality without any time limitation, unlike the Granas who had arrived before 1822. This provision encouraged many Granas of Italian origin to emigrate to Tunisia, where they formed a foreign minority—90 individuals in 1848, reinforced by a few French and British Jews—under the protection of the Tuscan consul and settled in the free district of Tunis, unlike the older Granas who lived in the Hara. Those who arrived after the unification of Italy also benefited from this provision.

From then on, political action was seen as a means to end the exceptional status affecting Jews, representing "a true rupture in the mental universe of Jewish communities, a rupture that broke the old world of submission to the order of things." In 1853, the caid of the Tunisian Jewish community, Nessim Samama, secured the abolition of the forced labor obligations that had previously burdened his co-religionists.

==== Residual discrimination ====
Despite everything, Jews remained subject to the payment of the jizya and exceptional taxes demanded by the bey as needed, and they also faced discrimination.

In terms of clothing, they were required to wear a black chechia instead of a red one, a black or dark blue turban instead of a white one, and black shoes instead of brightly colored ones. They were not allowed to live outside the neighborhoods assigned to them and could not own real estate. Finally, when they were victims of harassment or violence, they did not always receive reparations for the harm suffered.

=== Sfez affair ===
However, the relationship between Jews and Muslims changed radically from the mid-century due to the intrusion of European colonial powers in Tunisia, particularly France. These powers relied on the presence of Jews to promote their economic and commercial interests, as their situation—often marked by unfair treatment in Tunisian courts—served as a pretext for exerting pressure on the bey. The Sfez affair in 1857 illustrates this new context and provided an opportunity for France and the United Kingdom to intervene in the name of defending human rights and fighting absolutism and fanaticism to advance their interests.

Batou Sfez was a Jewish coachman serving the caïd of his community, Nessim Samama. Following a traffic incident and an altercation with a Muslim, he was accused of insulting Islam, with witnesses later confirming the scene before a notary. Charged and found guilty under Maliki law despite his protests, he was sentenced by the Sharia court to death for blasphemy and decapitation, and was executed by sword on June 24. The ruler Mohammed Bey sought through this act to appease resentment stemming from the execution of a Muslim accused of killing a Jew and to demonstrate that his justice system treated all subjects fairly.

Nevertheless, the severity of the sentence caused great consternation within the Jewish community and among the French and British consuls, Léon Roches and Richard Wood. They used the incident to pressure the ruler into adopting liberal reforms similar to those enacted in the Ottoman Empire in 1839. Moreover, the historian Ibn Abi Dhiaf referred to Tunisian Jews as "brothers in the homeland" (Ikhwanoun fil watan), although he criticized some for excessively seeking the protection of foreign consuls.

=== Mohammed Bey (1855–1881) – Failure of the Fundamental Pact ===
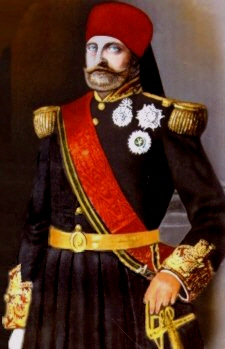
A portrait of Mohammed Bey

The arrival of a French squadron in the roadstead of Tunis forced the bey to proclaim the Fundamental Pact on September 10, 1857, with the support of Ibn Abi Dhiaf. He seemed to represent the most favorable attitude towards Jews among the reformers, while others were more skeptical.

The text radically changed the status of non-Muslims: Tunisian Jews, previously considered second-class subjects, escaped the secular status of dhimma.

Article 1 guaranteed "complete security" for persons and their property; Article 4 stated that "Jewish subjects will not be coerced into changing their religion and will not be prevented from practicing their faith"; Article 6 specified that "when the criminal court rules on the penalty incurred by a Jewish subject, Jewish assessors will also be appointed to the said court"; and Article 8 stated that all Tunisians, regardless of faith, now enjoyed the same rights and duties. Free access to property ownership and public office was also guaranteed to all.

The beylical decree of September 15, 1858, authorized Jews to wear a red chechia like Muslims and explicitly granted them the right to acquire real estate outside designated quarters. Additionally, it appears that the jizya ceased to be collected with the introduction of the mejba, which applied to all the bey's subjects, and that customs duties were now based on the origin or destination of goods rather than the merchant's religion.

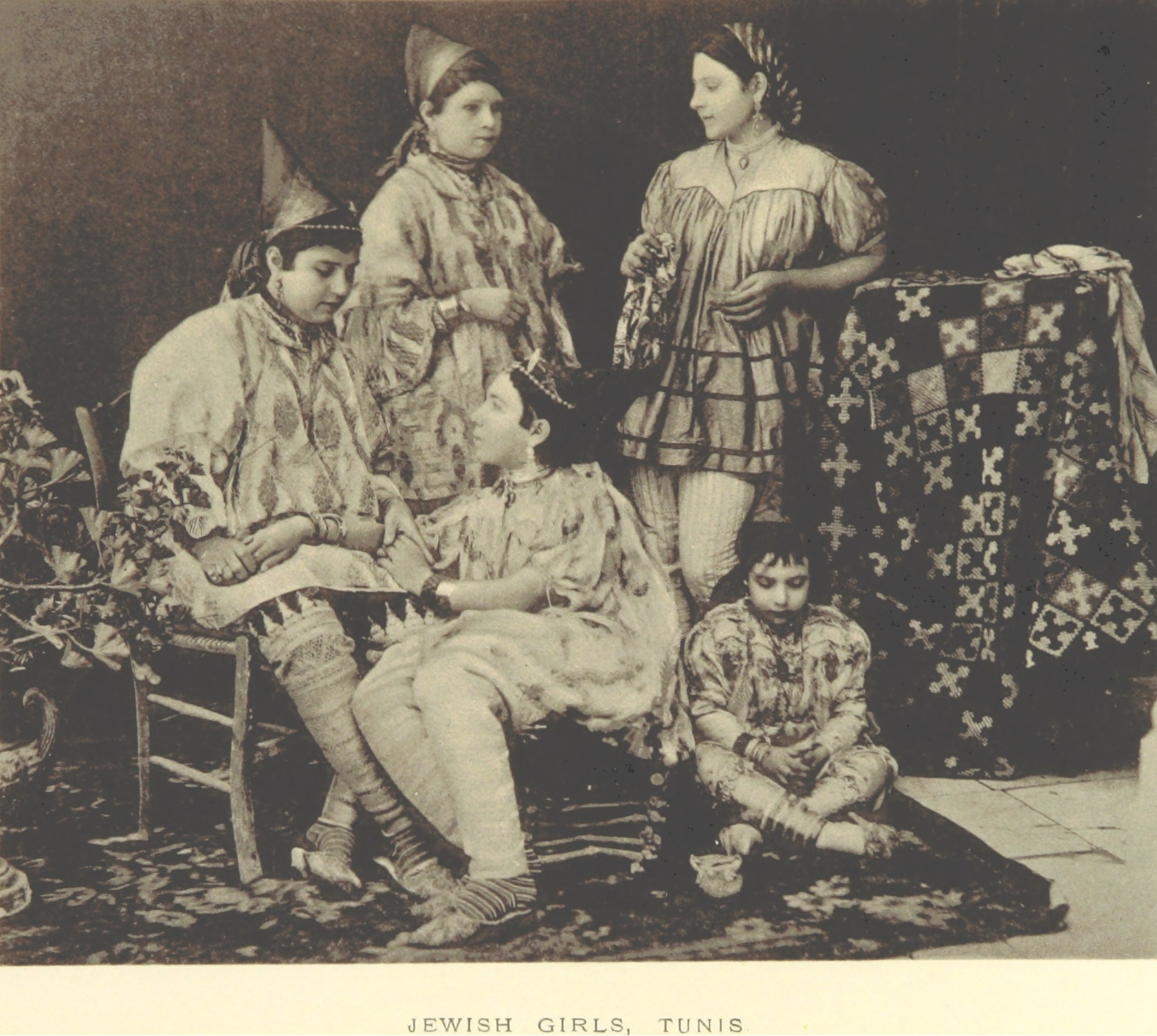
Jewish girls wearing a qufiya in Tunis (1887).

Sadok Bey, successor to Mohammed Bey, replaced the text with an organic law, equivalent to a full-fledged constitution, on April 21, 1861, and supplemented it on February 25, 1862, with a civil and criminal code. However, rising public expenditures due to new institutions and public works led to an increase in the mejba tax, sparking a revolt in April 1864, exacerbated by embezzlement and worsening economic conditions. During these events, Jews—accused of benefiting from these reforms—were physically attacked, their property targeted, and synagogues vandalized in Sousse, Gabès, Nabeul, Sfax, and Djerba. These disturbances lasted several years, with further outbreaks of violence in Tunis in 1869, where 17 Jews were killed without their murderers being brought to justice.

Bennot Smadja, "Jewish guide" of Tunis (May 1889).

Although the constitution was suspended shortly after the revolt—ultimately suppressed—the previous reforms remained in effect, and Jews who suffered losses were compensated by the government. Nevertheless, Tunisian courts continued to show particular severity towards Jews, leading Jewish notables to seek the protection of consuls. Crimes against Jews also went unpunished.

The country became a battleground for European influence, with some Jewish notables receiving protection patents that allowed them to retain Tunisian nationality while placing themselves under the jurisdiction of consular courts. The European powers that favored these protections could thereby justify their interventions in the country's internal affairs.

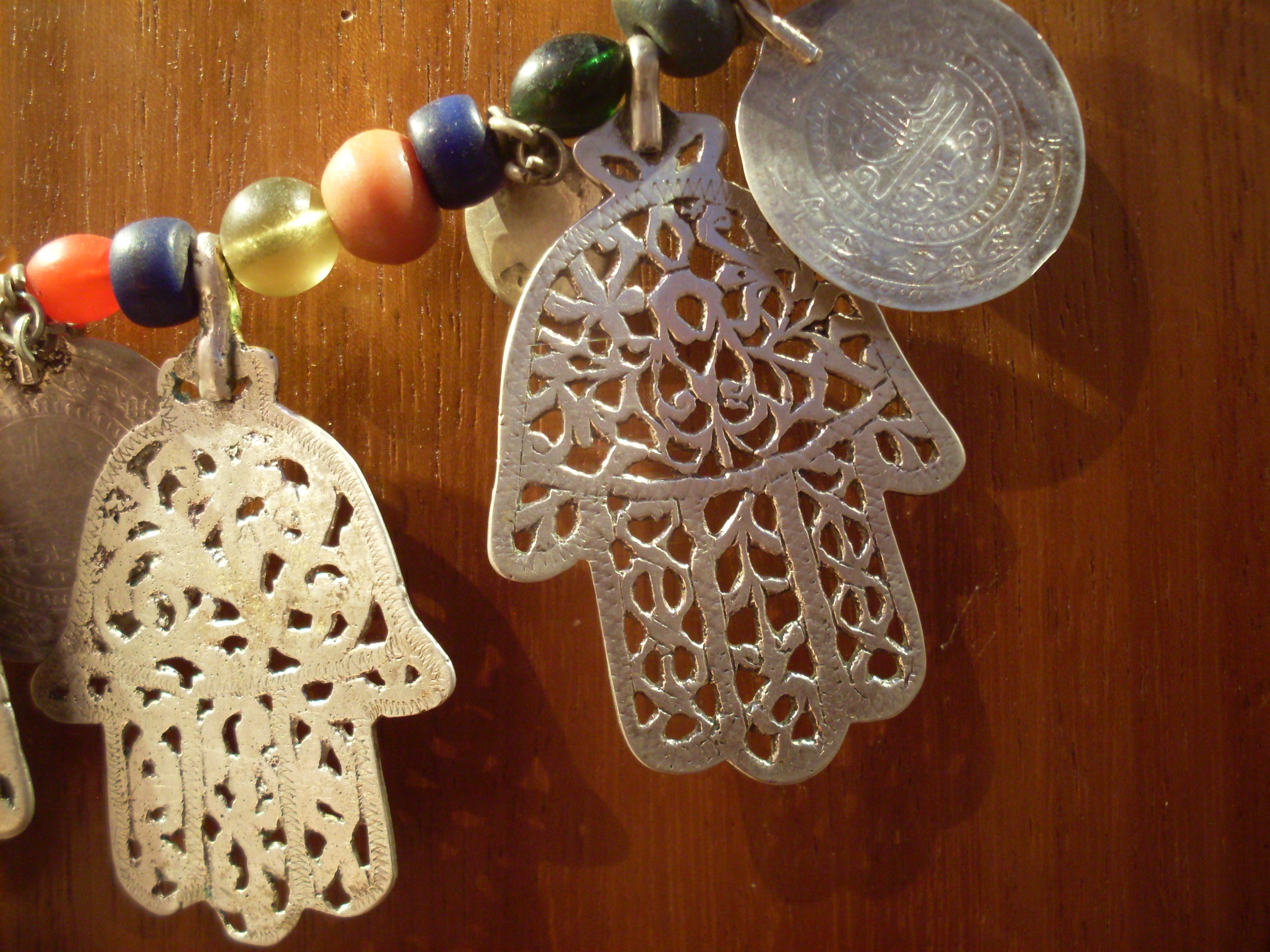
Hamsa displayed in Djerba.

By the late 19th century, both Granas and Twansa spoke Judeo-Tunisian Arabic, a Judeo-Arabic dialect transcribed in Hebrew script but similar to that spoken by Muslims, except for a few pronunciation variations, a reduced emphasis on certain emphatic consonants, and rare Hebrew borrowings strictly in a religious context.

At the same time, despite growing criticism of the traditional education system, Talmudic studies still produced notable rabbis such as Judah Lévy, Joseph Borgel, Joshua Bessis, Abraham Cohen, and Abraham Hagège.

In terms of clothing, both groups had adopted Muslim dress with slight variations (men were required to wear dark-colored turbans, and women wore a pointed headdress called qufiya) even recently arrived Granas and wealthy Twansa wore European-style clothing.

Religious observance remained strong: Saturday was a rest day, religious holidays were celebrated with varying levels of festivity, and pilgrimages were made to Jerusalem. However, superstitions persisted—such as the protective power of the Hamsa against the evil eye or the fear of djinns—shared with Muslims.

=== Cultural changes ===
In 1878, shortly before the establishment of French control, the first Alliance Israélite Universelle school opened in Tunisia. The school offered instruction in French; while it included Jewish religious and cultural material as part of the curriculum, it marked a turning point for the community as children began to receive a secular education.

== French Protectorate (1881–1956) ==
On the eve of French colonisation of Tunisia, the Jewish population was approximately 25,000, most of which was concentrated in Tunis.

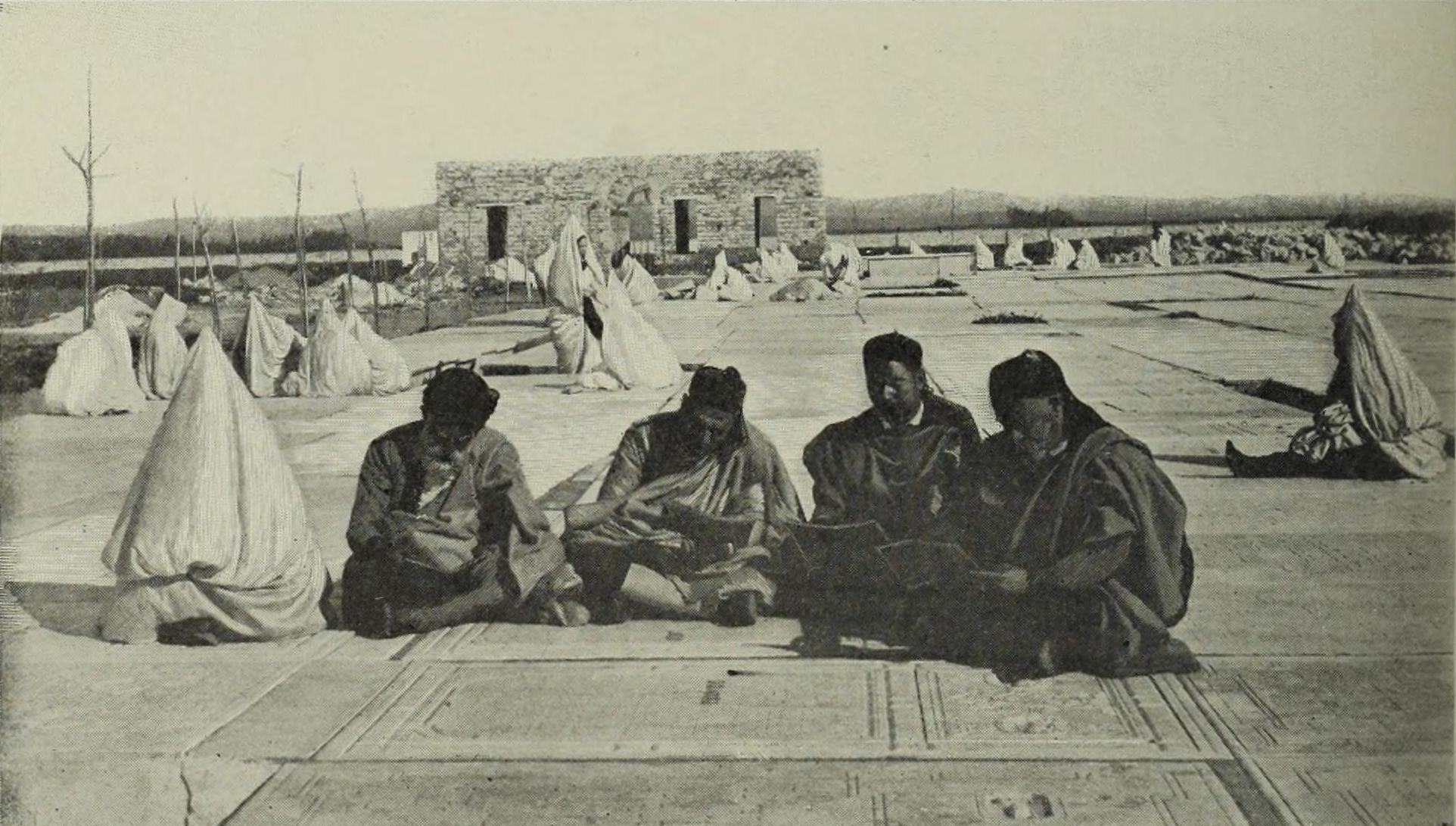
Mourners in the Borgel Jewish Cemetery, Tunis, c. 1900.

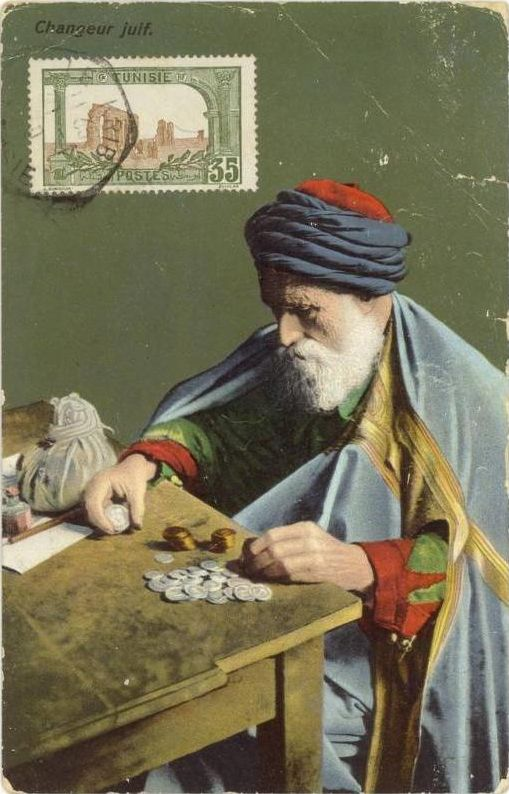
Jewish Money changer in Tunisia

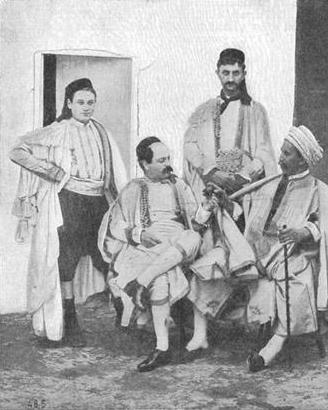
A group of Tunisian Jews

The Jews of Tunisia felt much safer under the French protectorate. Contact with the French colonizers of Tunisia and the official presence of the French facilitated the assimilation of the Jews of Tunisia to French culture and their emancipation. Relying on the French revolutionary promise of Liberté, égalité, fraternité, the Jews hoped for a better life and were very receptive to the new French influences, despite their Christian European source. For the generation born under the protectorate, the French language replaced Judeo-Arabic as the mother tongue of the Jews of French Tunisia. Additionally, more Jewish children began attending state schools throughout the country, which slowly lead to the diffusion of French culture and lifestyle within the Jewish community.

=== Political status ===
Initially, the newly arrived Jews did not suffer significantly from antisemitism. Nevertheless, the newspaper La Tunisie française frequently published attacks. From March 26 to 29, 1898, a fight between Jews and Arabs escalated into riots during which Jews were assaulted, their homes looted, and their shops ransacked, without police intervention (a form of "pogrom"). Despite convictions being handed down, the responsibility for the unrest was never clearly established. The tense context of the Dreyfus affair further added to fears of violence, though its resolution helped strengthen the Jews' attachment to France and encouraged them to make demands.

While the French presence led to the continued francization of the Jewish community, the desired rapprochement sought by its elites was not without challenges. Extending French jurisdiction to Tunisian Jews, along with the abolition of the rabbinical court and the possibility of individual naturalization, became key priorities for the modernist intelligentsia who had attended French universities. These priorities were first articulated by Mardochée Smaja in 1905 and later championed in the weekly newspaper La Justice founded in 1907. Although representatives of the French community in Tunisia supported these ideas, the protectorate administration, the French government under the French Third Republic, and conservative rabbinical authorities, backed by the most popular factions of the Jewish community, opposed them. Modernist Muslims also criticized these reforms, seeing them as undermining sovereignty and creating inequality among citizens of the same state.

Proposals to reform naturalization requirements faced hostility from authorities seeking to encourage French settlement and protect relations with the government and Muslim population. Community institution reforms were also rejected, as authorities feared they might come under the control of the Granas, who were sympathetic to Italy. Though the colonial authorities sought support within the community to strengthen their authority, this secular and liberal elite was quickly excluded from influential positions.

Facing Italian ambitions over Tunisia and the desire to increase the number of French settlers, a relaxation of naturalization conditions for Tunisian subjects was finally decided on October 3, 1910. Although the process remained selective and individual, it opened the possibility for Jews to become French citizens. Tunisian subjects over 21 who demonstrated fluency in French were eligible for naturalization if they met one of the following conditions: voluntary service in the French Armed Forces, earning a diploma, prize, or medal in higher education, marriage to a Frenchwoman with children, rendering important services to French interests in Tunisia for over ten years, or rendering exceptional services to France. These strict conditions kept the number of naturalizations low (93 between 1911 and 1914), respecting the opinions of both French and Muslim populations in Tunisia; however, they fell short of Jewish community expectations.

Community organizational reforms were also implemented: the position of caid was abolished, and the Relief and Welfare Fund of Tunis was entrusted to an administrative committee appointed by ministerial decree; all cities with significant communities were given similar structures.

After an intermediate period, the protectorate administration recognized only one chief rabbi from the Twansa community, whose authority was extended across the country, bringing initial unity to the country's community institutions.

=== Socio-economic integration ===
Due to its intermediate socio-cultural position, the francized native Jewish elite identified with republican and secular values, rejecting the existing Arab and Muslim order. This position allowed for both the social and cultural advancement of the community and the preservation of a strong identity through partnerships with other communities and guarantees provided by France. The ideology of the republican school also inspired great enthusiasm within the community. The universalist culture it transmitted offered an escape from national questions while providing a path out of domination through socio-professional advancement after centuries of relative stagnation, leading to the acquisition of a more valued social status.

However this attitude was not universally shared among Tunisian Jews. In October 1900, a group "belonging to two traditions, the Portuguese and the Tunisian", sent a letter to Zadoc Kahn, the chief rabbi of France and honorary president of the Alliance Israélite Universelle, voicing their anger at the Alliance itself, at the education and values it promoted, and at its attempts to displace and usurp their own traditions with French ones. The authors wrote, "Do not forget that the Jews of Tunisia are not merely Jews, which in itself separates them from the French, but they are also Eastern Jews, Arab Jews, and as such so dramatically different from the French".

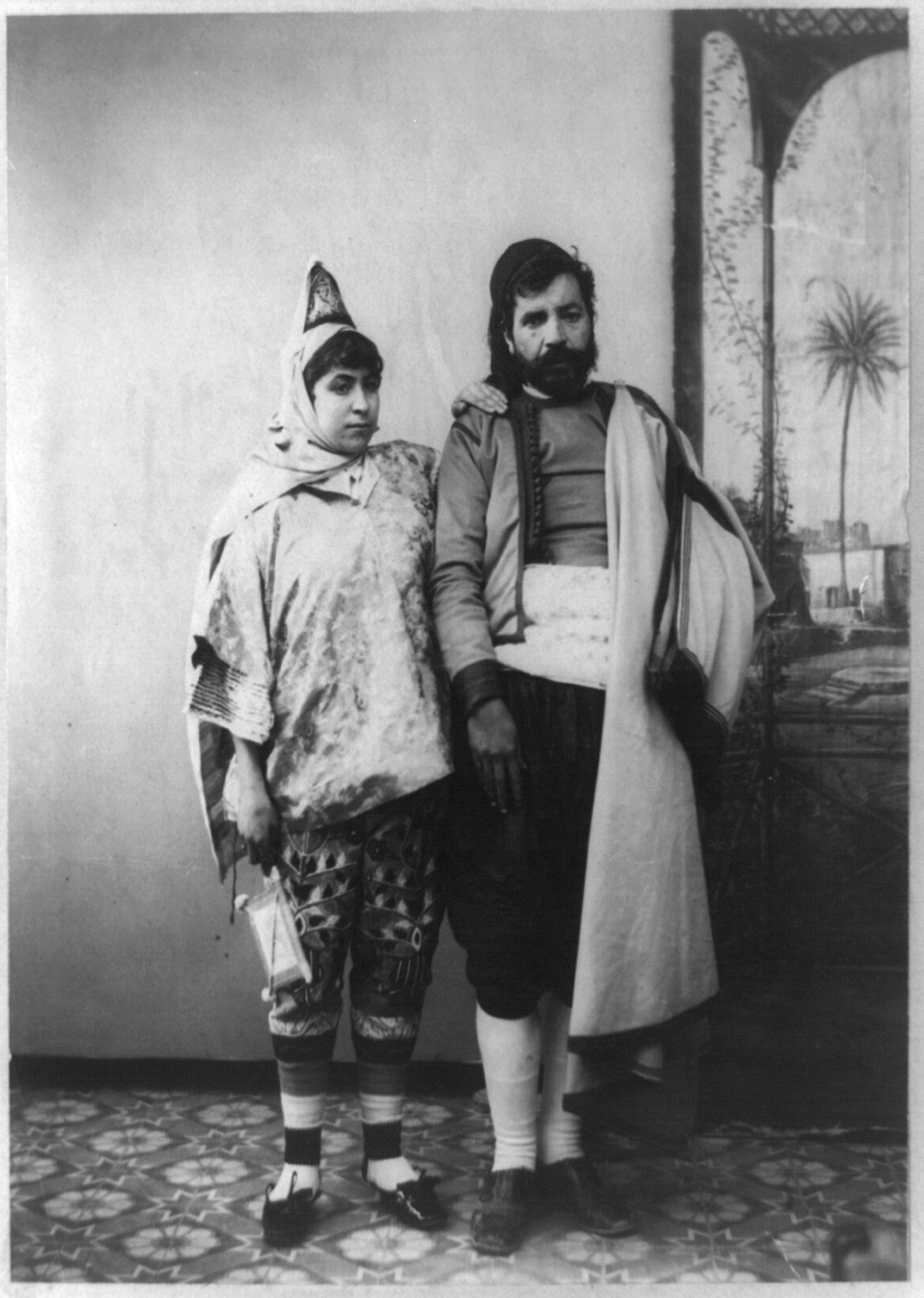
Tunisian Jewish couple (early 20th century).

The relative opening of society, with the emergence of independent social spaces such as schools, cafés, theaters, and sports clubs, contributed to the emancipation of individuals from their groups and religion and the decline of traditional Judeo-Arab culture, which nevertheless persisted in rural communities. While new synagogues were built in all cities, a notable decline in religious practice was observed, even if it remained the domain of a minority among the wealthy and educated. This phenomenon was associated with a reduction in knowledge of Hebrew due to its absence from public school curriculums, where a majority of children of both genders were enrolled, although Talmud Torah schools continued to operate in major cities.

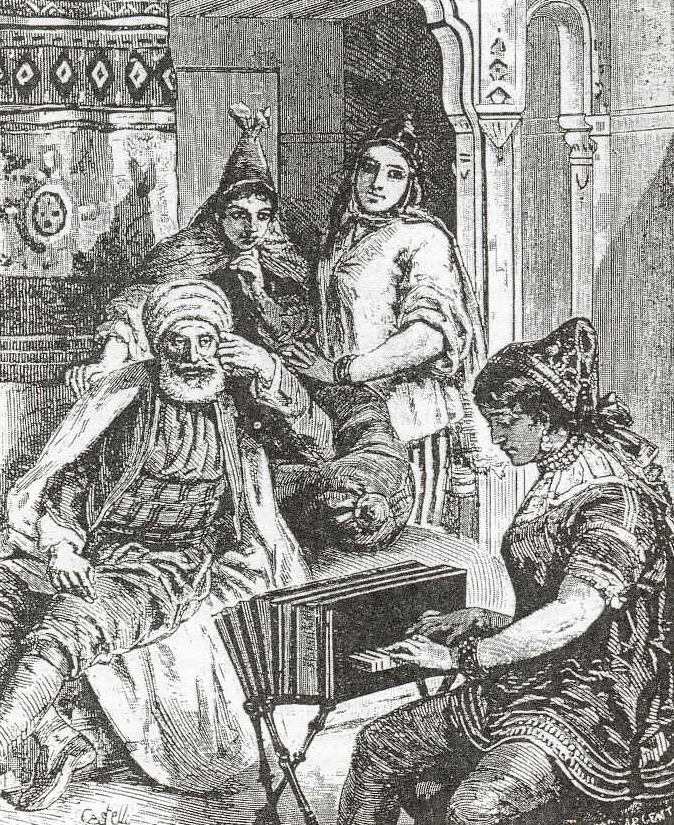
Jewish family in Tunis listening to music on a Saturday evening.

By the end of the century, families with sufficient financial resources sent their children to secondary or even higher education. At the same time, the community prospered by taking advantage of the colonial economy. While Jews continued to practice traditional trades in commerce, trading, and craftsmanship, young people graduating from schools and training centers were increasingly employed in workshops, shops, and offices. They also joined the network of bank and insurance branches established by French companies, ventured into new professions, participated in the creation of early industries, or started agricultural enterprises.

The proportion of employees increased significantly as young people fluent in French had sufficient mastery of the Arabic dialect to act as intermediaries between their French employers and Tunisian clients. The next generation was encouraged to go beyond primary education and enter liberal professions, such as medicine, pharmacy, or law, often after studying in France or Italy.

Westernized Jewish families abandoned their traditional dwellings (oukalas) in the Hara of Tunis to settle in individual apartments on its outskirts or, for the wealthiest, in the new neighborhoods of Tunis. These economic transformations led to a restructuring of Jewish society: a commercial, industrial, and even agricultural bourgeoisie; a liberal class (lawyers, doctors, pharmacists, and architects); a middle class (traders, artisans, employees, and civil servants); a still-small working class; and a mass of unqualified laborers, the sick, and the disabled with modest means, who survived only through community support and were often concentrated in the Hara.

=== Cultural integration ===
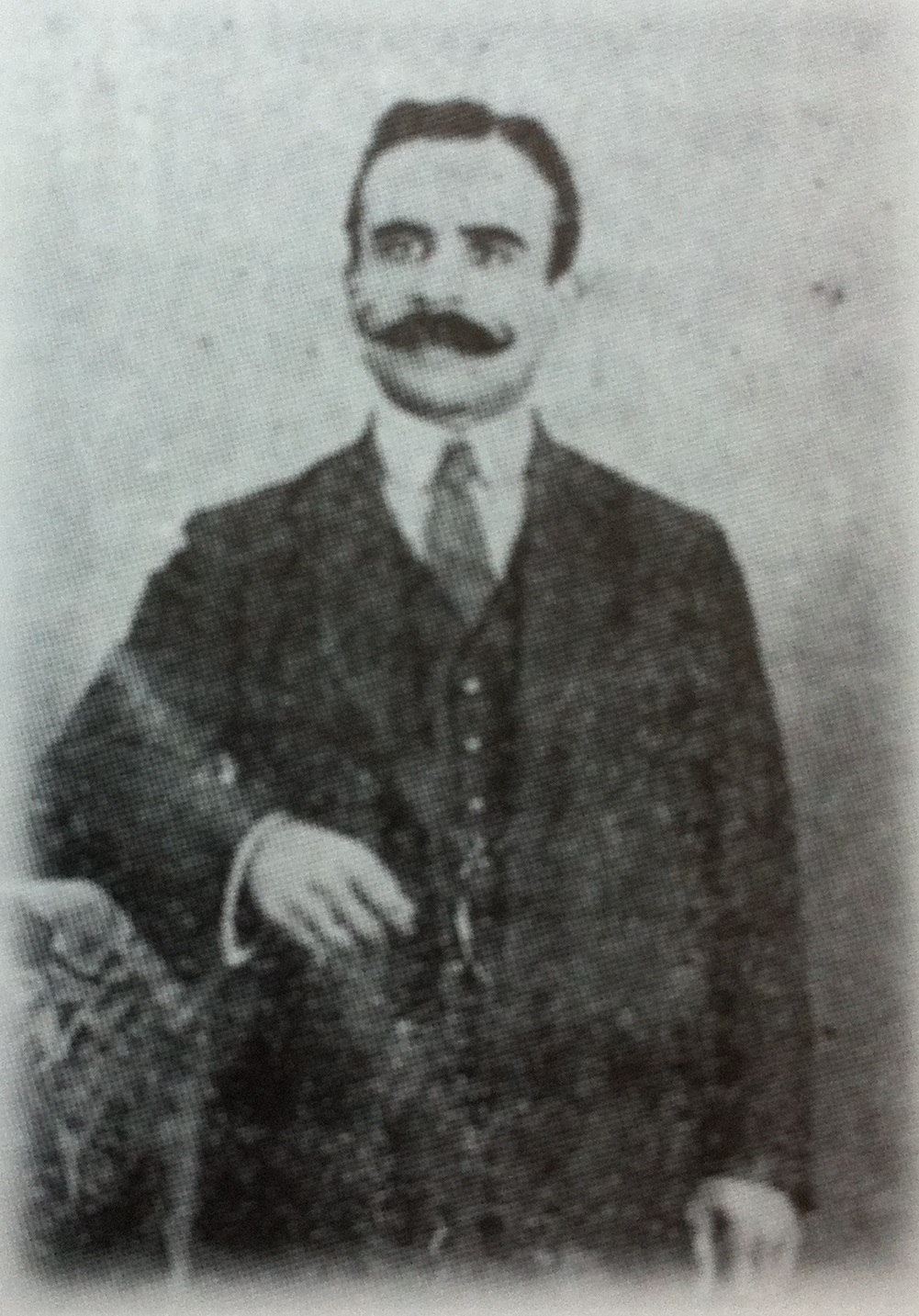
Makhlouf Nadjar (1888–1963), writer, journalist, and theater director from Sousse.

Schooling played a significant role in the acculturation of new generations. As a result, French became a maternal language alongside Arabic, sometimes even replacing it, enabling individuals’ emancipation and social mobility. At the same time, European first names replaced Hebrew or Arabic ones, European clothing was adopted, weekly work rhythms were embraced, and superstitious beliefs and practices shared with Muslims were abandoned. Women also emancipated themselves through changes in clothing, although at a slower pace than men and with intergenerational and intrafamilial gaps.

Many Tunisian Jews became eligible for French citizenship under the Morinaud laws of 1923.

Simultaneously, marital and paternal authority was moderated by the development of female education, the growing influence of modernist values, and the higher education levels of new generations. Additionally, the age of marriage increased, consanguineous marriages became rarer, intermarriages between Twansa and Granas became more frequent, and nuclear families became more distinct from extended families.

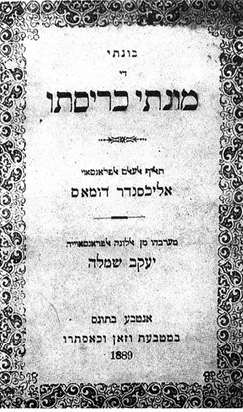
First page of The Count of Monte Cristo in seven volumes, translated into Judeo-Arabic by the ceramist and journalist Jacob Chemla (1889).

With the dissemination of Hebrew printing in Tunis, a few years after the establishment of the protectorate, a new era of significant intellectual and social activity began, encompassing poetry, prose essays, and journalism. Many individuals found their vocation as poets, songwriters, storytellers, essayists, or journalists. Over 25 periodicals in Judeo-Tunisian Arabic emerged, although this phenomenon faded quickly after World War I. Religious works, Arabic literature, folklore, translations of European literature, and original creations were published.

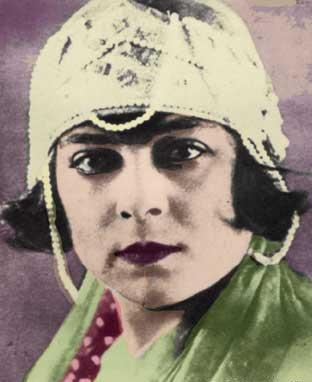
Habiba Msika.

Other writings, often long ballads or rhymed narratives, described events within the community, whether social, cultural, or domestic, but especially the evolving customs and behaviors of a modernizing community. Distributed as leaflets or small booklets, these texts were sometimes written in loosely transcribed Latin characters and were always based on popular tunes. Quickly, traditional local poetic genres emerged. In a bibliography compiled between 1904 and 1907 by Eusèbe Vassel, he cataloged poetic works by prolific pioneers like Simah Levy. Vassel also cited Haï Vita Sitruk and Malzouma on the Disappointments of This World, written by an anonymous author. Hundreds of popular poems, initially composed in Tunis and later in other communities like Djerba and Sousse, told Jewish traditions in a novel way that some traditionalist authors considered "threatening".

These creations also allowed, for the first time in printed form, the dissemination of lyrical or romantic texts, influenced by both local production and Arab-Muslim works from Egypt, which were very popular in Tunisia at the time. During this period, Jewish artists like Leïla Sfez, Habiba Msika, and Cheikh El Afrit gained widespread fame and contributed to the revival of Tunisian music. A cultural shift also occurred with the emergence of Jewish painters such as Moses Levy, Maurice Bismouth, David Junès, and Jules Lellouche. Albert Samama-Chikli directed the first short film in the history of Tunisian cinema, Zohra, in 1922.

== World War II ==
Following the armistice of 22 June 1940, the French Protectorate of Tunisia became part of Vichy France, the new French state ruled by collaborationist Marshal Philippe Pétain during France's occupation by Nazi Germany in World War II. Under the rule of Pétain's collaborationist regime, the Jews of Vichy France and Vichy Tunisia were subjected to the two antisemitic Statut des Juifs (Jewish Statutes of October 3, 1940, and June 2, 1941), like the Jews in mainland France. Thus, discriminatory legislation defined the Jews, restricted them in the public service, in educational institutions and journalism, and in liberal professions (numerus clausus), counted them (Jewish census), and forced them to register their property to be subsequently aryanized. Consequently, Jews found themselves in their prior inferior status of "natives" and were impoverished. In August 1941, Xavier Vallat, head of the Office for Jewish Affairs (Commissariat Général aux Questions Juives), came from Metropolitan France to check the matter of the Jewish question. According to an article on the United States Holocaust Memorial Museum (USHMM) website, "The history of the Holocaust in France's three North African territories (the three departments, 91, 92, and 93, in French Algeria, the two French protectorates of Morocco and Tunisia) is intrinsically tied to France's fate during this period." Holocaust scholar Martin Gilbert specified that the persecution of the Jews of French North Africa was an integral part of the Holocaust in France.

"The German government was unable to implement in Tunisia the 'Final Solution' that it had already decided to apply to the Jewish question. Nazi Germany could not organize the extermination of the Jewish population on-site without risking revealing to the world what it intended to conceal for as long as possible. Nor could it consider transporting the Jews of Tunisia to the extermination camps established in Eastern Europe, as this would have required using ships and planes that were needed for more pressing military needs."

The Jews of Vichy-French North Africa were relatively fortunate because their distance from Nazi concentration camps in Central and Eastern Europe permitted them to avoid the fate of their coreligionists in Metropolitan France. Immediately after the Allied landings in Vichy-Algeria and Vichy-Morocco, the Germans occupied Vichy Tunisia. On November 23, 1942, the Germans arrested Moises Burgel, the president of the Tunis Jewish community, and several other prominent Jews. The Jews of Vichy Tunisia were spared the mass deportations and mass murder that happened in Europe.

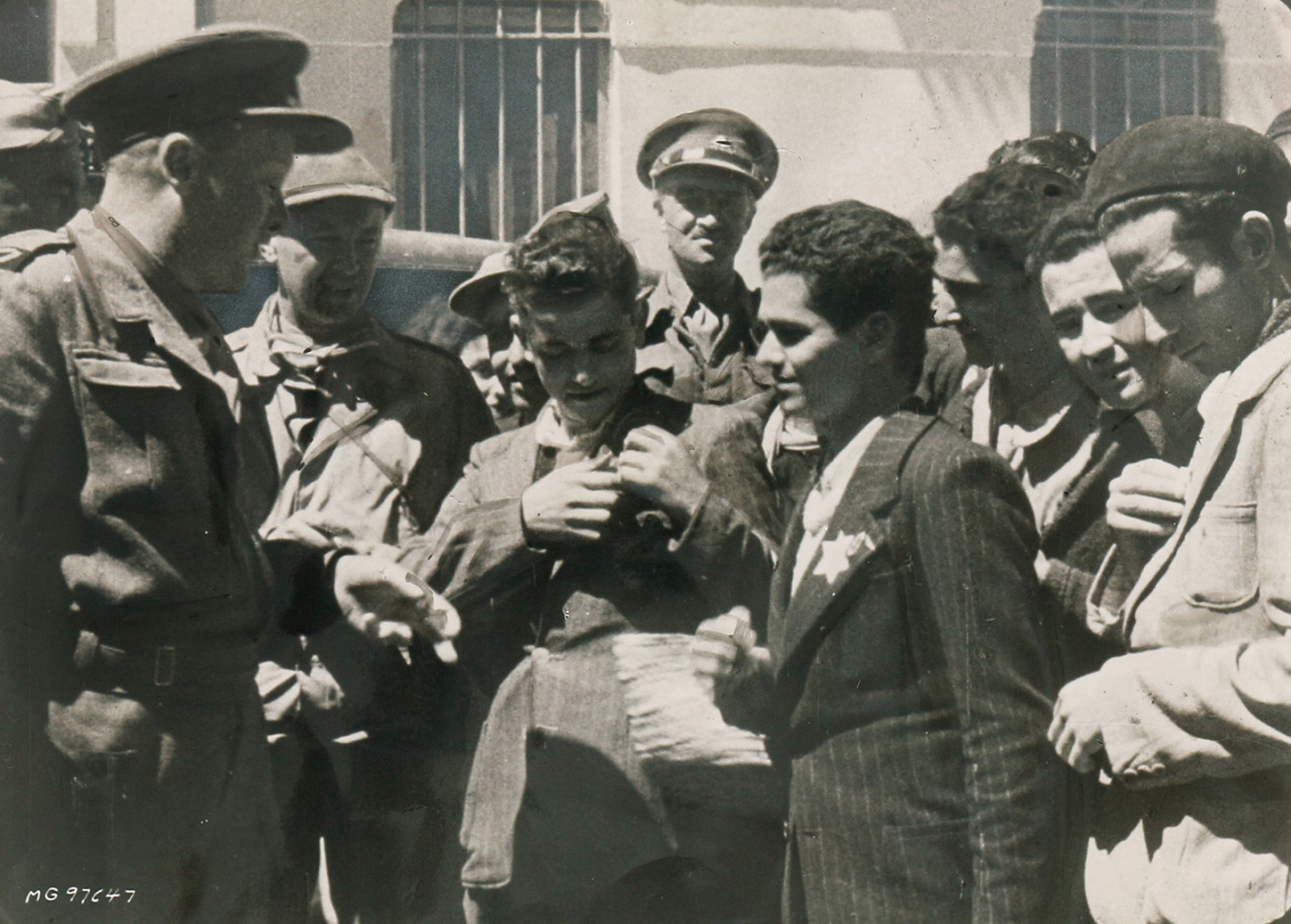
Tunisian Jews tear off the yellow badge from their clothes, encouraged by the Allied soldiers who liberated their village from Vichy French rule

When the Nazis invaded Vichy Tunisia, the country was home to some 100,000 Jews. According to Yad Vashem, the Nazis imposed antisemitic policies including forcing Jews to wear the yellow badge, fines, and confiscation of property. More than 5,000 Jews were sent to forced labor camps, where 265 are known to have been murdered. An additional 160 Jews of Tunisia living in France were sent to extermination camps in continental Europe.

Khaled Abdul-Wahab, a Muslim Arab of Vichy Tunisia, "the Arab Schindler," was the first Arab nominated for the Israeli Righteous Among the Nations award.

== Post-War period ==
Between the end of World War II and the independence of Tunisia in March 1956, there was deep debate in the Tunisian Jewish community over Zionism. Anti-Jewish attacks in Hafsia in 1952 and conflict surrounding the independence struggle resulted in the first wave of emigration.

=== Continued emigration ===
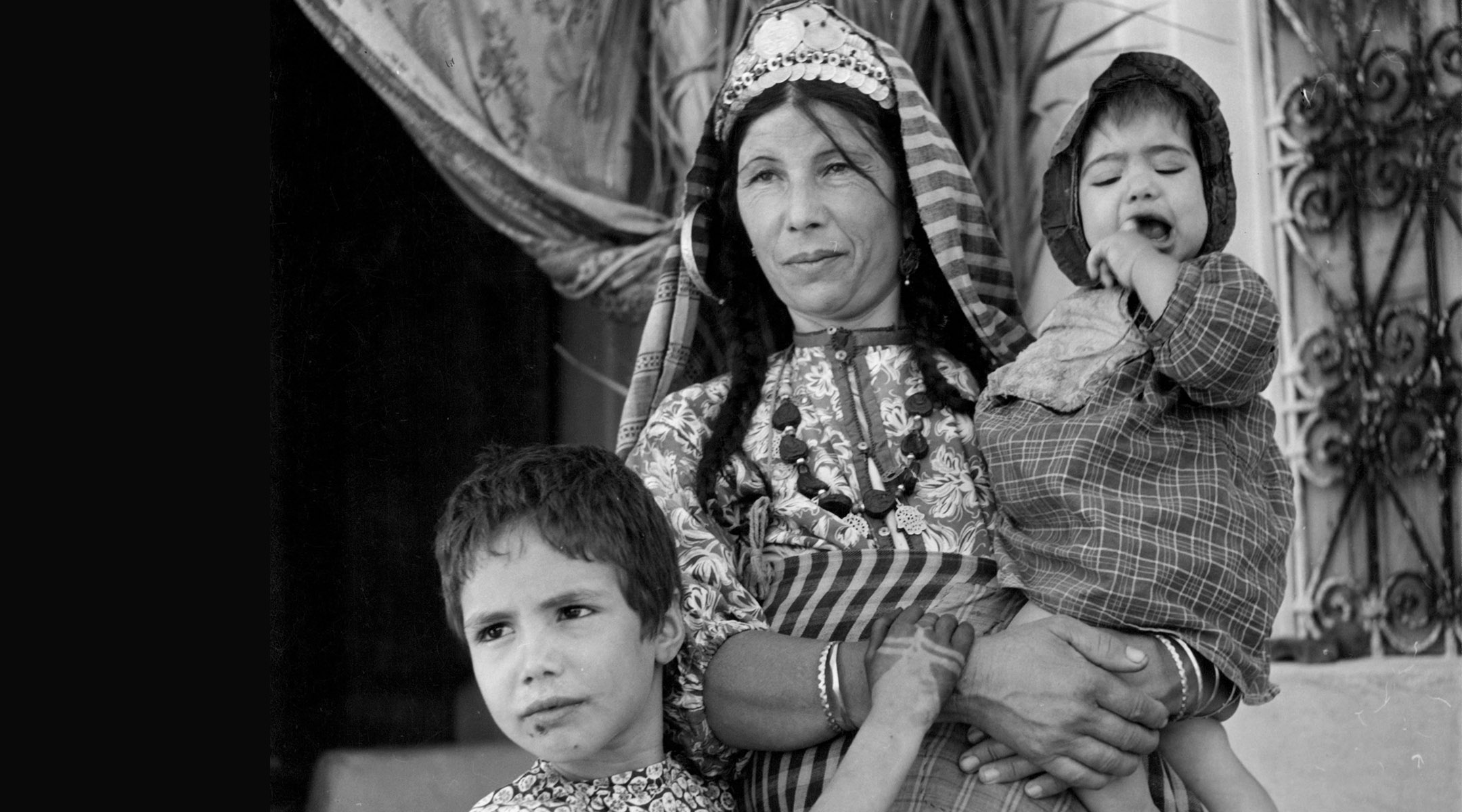
Jewish woman and children at the entrance of a synagogue in Djerba (1950).

In June 1950, the AIU services recorded a Jewish population of 5,500 people in Sousse, 500 in Moknine, 300 in Mahdia, 150 in Kairouan, 70 in Monastir, and 60 in Enfidaville.

After the emigration of their main leaders to Israel in 1952, they were dismantled but reconstituted in 1955 by the Mossad and its armed branch, known as Misgeret. Shlomo Havillio, chief commander of Misgeret in Paris between 1955 and 1960 and responsible for operations in the Maghreb, later admitted that "the initial fears about possible reactions from Tunisian nationalists against Jews were much more imaginary than real [...] The only concern could come from the presence of revolutionaries in Tunisian society after independence." In this context, the leaders of the Neo Destour, while not supporting Zionism, stated they would not prevent Jews from leaving Tunisia for Israel.

For instance, Habib Bourguiba declared in August 1954:

The Neo-Destourians are entirely opposed to antisemitism and discrimination against Tunisian Jews. They stand for full equality of rights [...] The Tunisian government and the Neo-Destourians will do everything to ensure the well-being of Jews, but if some Jews prefer to emigrate to Israel for one reason or another, we will not make any difficulties for them.

Upon its legalization in Tunisia, the Jewish Agency opened a special office in Tunis and later branches in other cities. These offices, run by Israeli representatives and local Jewish activists, organized the emigration of a significant portion of the Jewish populations from cities such as Sousse, Sfax, and Tunis, as well as southern regions like Ben Gardane, Médenine, Gafsa, Gabès, and Djerba. This phenomenon primarily affected the more traditionalist and poorer communities with little to lose.

In total, over 25,000 individuals emigrated between 1948 and 1955. Consequently, the Jewish population declined by 18.6% over ten years, with decreases of 7.7% in the Tunis region, 33.5% in the North, 26.9% in the center, 38.9% in the South, and 44.4% in the extreme South.

While the less assimilated, working-class groups primarily emigrated to Israel, the intellectual elite split between France and Israel. The cultured and now French-speaking Livornese community saw few members ultimately settle in Italy.

== Independence of Tunisia ==
In post-independence Tunisia, the economic and political situation led to the departure of most Jews who had chosen to remain in the country after independence. Most lawyers, affected by the Arabization of the judicial system, decided to settle in France, where their clientele relocates, as did doctors and dental surgeons. Public officials were excluded from certain ministries, such as Foreign Affairs, National Defense, and State Security, and did not always benefit from promotions based on seniority and competence. Furthermore, the administration systematically favored companies owned by Muslim Tunisians, while businesses owned by Jewish Tunisians were subjected to stricter tax audits and heavier taxation. The socialist turn in the government's economic policy ultimately stifles most of these businesses, which had disappeared by the early 1970s.

In this context, the Bizerte crisis, which occurred in the summer of 1961, raised fears of reprisals and a violent outbreak of antisemitism following rumors that Jews had assisted French troops. This led to the departure of 4500 people from the country in 1962. It was followed by an even larger wave of emigration, including the singer Acher Mizrahi during the Six-Day War. Thousands of demonstrators filled the streets of Tunis on June 5, 1967, destroying Jewish-owned shops and setting fire to places of worship, including the Grand Synagogue of Tunis, where books and Torah scrolls were burned. However, there were no reports of violence against individuals. Despite President Bourguiba's condemnation of the events, apologies to Tunisia's chief rabbi Mordekhai Meiss Cohen, and promises the same evening to uphold the rights and safety of the community, an additional 7000 Jews emigrated to France and 2,362 to Israel.

In general, the Jewish population that remains, about 12,000 people (including 10,000 of Tunisian nationality), three-quarters of whom are concentrated in the Tunis region at the beginning of the 1970s, consists of bourgeois families with substantial wealth justifying their presence in Tunisia, members of the middle class convinced they can continue practicing their profession under similar conditions, members of the intelligentsia wanting to contribute to the country's development, and individuals unable to find better opportunities abroad due to a lack of resources.

In 1971, the assassination of a rabbi in the heart of the capital triggered a new wave of emigration. The Yom Kippur War in October 1973, the Operation Peace for Galilee on June 6, 1982, the establishment of the Palestine Liberation Organization (PLO) headquarters in Hammam Chott, and its bombing by the Israeli Air Force on October 1, 1985, further spurred additional waves of emigration.

Several incidents also occurred, such as during Yom Kippur in 1982, when Jews were targeted in Zarzis, Ben Gardane, and Djerba. In October 1983, the Zarzis Synagogue was ravaged by a fire attributed by the Jewish community to extremist groups. In 1985, a soldier guarding the Ghriba synagogue in Djerba opened fire on worshippers, killing five people, including four Jews. According to Frédéric Lasserre and Aline Lechaume, the shooter was a policeman on duty outside a synagogue on the island who, officially described as acting "in a fit of madness," killed two worshippers and injured six.

Another incident occurred toward the end of President Bourguiba's tenure: the Club Med in Korba was vandalized after an operator had vacationers sing the Israeli national anthem. Following these incidents, the government implemented measures to protect the Jewish community.

Following independence, a mixed picture emerged.

== Arab Spring (post-2011) ==
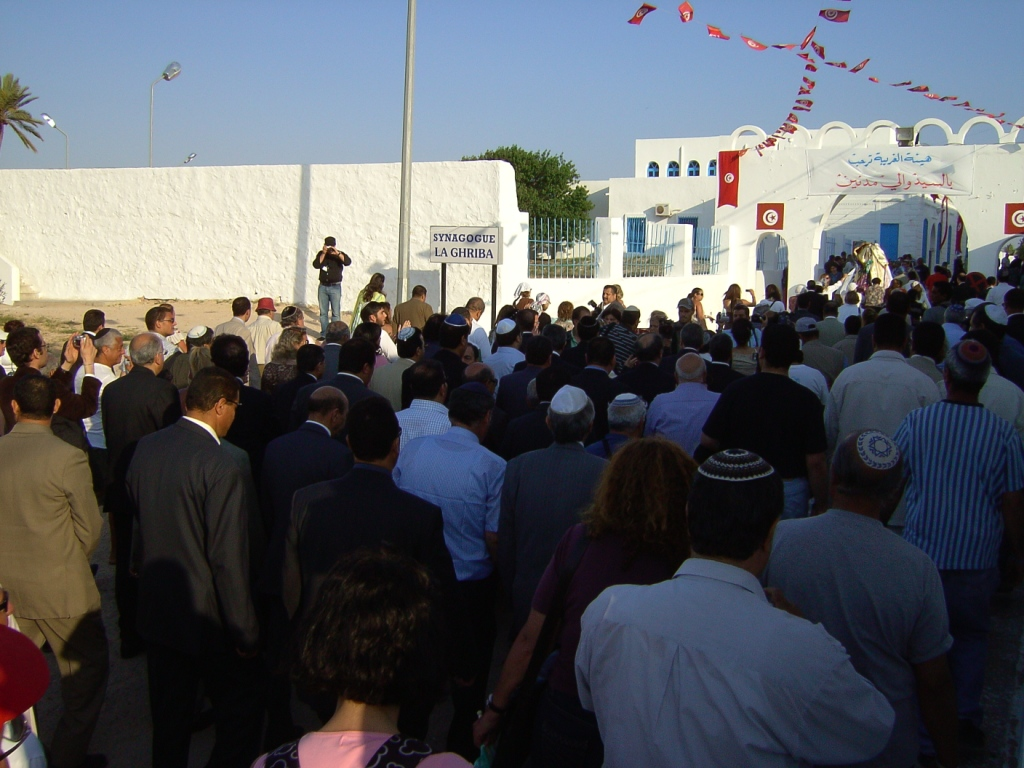
Lag Ba'Omer procession returning to the El Ghriba synagogue in Er-Riadh (Hara Sghira), Djerba 2007

After the Tunisian revolution, Ennahda became the leading political force in the country, elected as the largest party in the transitional government. The party's leader, Rached Ghannouchi, sent a delegation to the Jews in Djerba, assuring them that they have nothing to worry about in a democratic Tunisia, where the Islamists would play a larger role. He even sent gifts to the Jewish nursing homes in Tunis. In November 2012, the community asked for the army's protection when a policeman was arrested after plotting to kidnap a young Jew for a ransom.

In 2011, the Israeli cabinet announced that it had allocated funding to help Tunisian Jews move to Israel due to growing manifestations of antisemitism and the difficult economic situation.

In January 2014, the Ennahda-led government voluntarily stepped aside and a transitional government, appointed to rule during the drafting of the new constitution until democratic elections would be held later in the year, took office. The new secular constitution for the first time explicitly protected not only freedom of religion, but freedom of conscience (freedom to become atheist, leave or change religions), and explicitly protected minorities such as Jews from official or unofficial discrimination. The new Tunisian constitution is the first of its kind in the Maghreb and the Arab world in embracing both Arabism and liberal secularism, and is seen as a model for other countries to adopt. The democratically elected constitutional committee, dominated by Ennahda, also rejected terms which would have forbidden relations with Israel.

In 2026, pilgrimage and religious activity in the El Ghriba Synagogue in Djerba were officially reinstated and maintained under heightened security measures. Attendance remained low with an estimated 200 International visitors, shadowed by the 2023 attack that killed two worshipers.

== Education and culture ==
The Jewish community in Tunis operates three primary schools, two secondary schools, and a yeshiva. The Jewish community in Djerba operates one kindergarten, two primary schools, two secondary schools, and a yeshiva. There is also a Jewish primary school and synagogue in the coastal city of Zarzis. The Jewish community also has two homes for the aged. Tunisia's first Jewish museum opened in 2012. In 2015, Tunis' last kosher restaurant closed due to security concerns.

== Synagogues ==
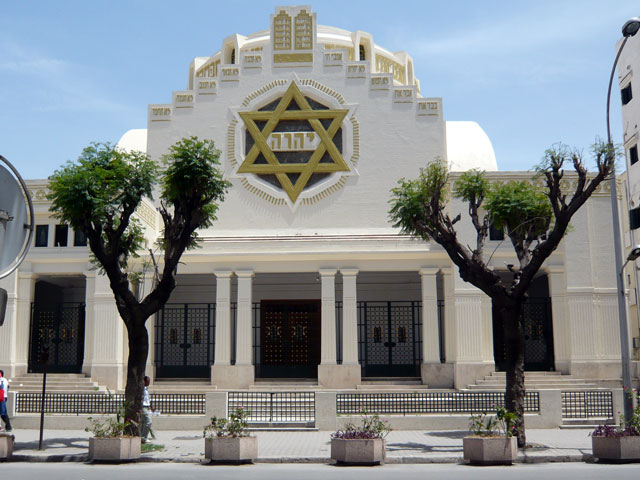
Grand Synagogue of Tunis

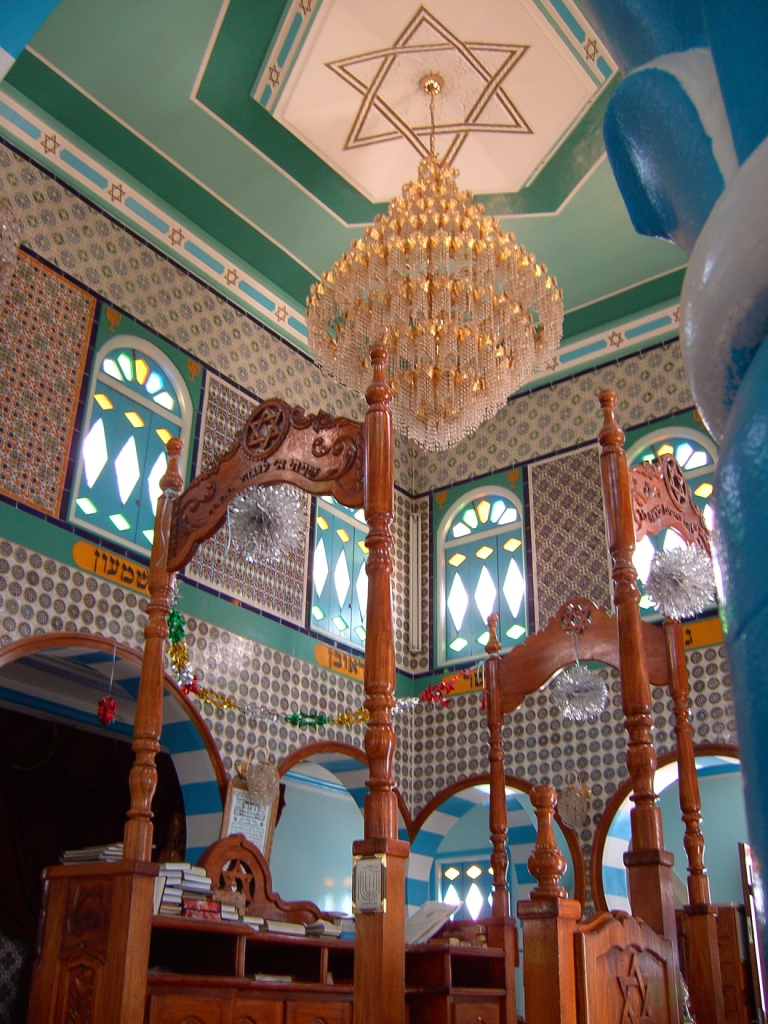
Zarzis Synagogue

The most famous synagogue in Tunisia is the El Ghriba Synagogue in the village of Hara Sghira on Djerba. The current building was constructed in late 19th or early 20th century, but the site is believed to have had a synagogue on it for the past 1,900 years. Tunisian Jews have for centuries made an annual pilgrimage to the synagogue on Lag Ba'Omer. On April 11, 2002, a truck full of explosives was detonated close to the synagogue, killing 21 people (of whom 14 were German tourists and 2 Frenchmen), and wounding over 30. Al Qaeda claimed responsibility. Hayyim Madar was the chief rabbi until his death on December 3, 2004. Memorial services were held at the Beit Mordekhai Synagogue in La Goulette, Tunis, and the El Ghriba synagogue on the island of Djerba.

In May 2023, a Tunisian police officer killed four in a shooting near El Ghriba synagogue on Djerba, also the site of 2002's Ghriba synagogue bombing. An attacker fired a gun into a crowd visiting the house of worship during an annual pilgrimage event. In October 2023, during pro-Palestine protests riots sparked by blame on Israel for the Al-Ahli Arab Hospital bombing, hundreds of rioters hammered away the building's walls, set fire and planted Palestinian flags at the site of a historic synagogue in Tunisia, El Hamma Synagogue, with videos showing people attacking it without police intervention.

== Genetic studies of Jews in Tunisia ==
Numerous studies have been conducted on the genetics of Jews in general, on North African Jews in particular, and specifically on Jews of Tunisian origin.

They conclude that "the closest genetic neighbors to most Jewish groups were the Palestinians, Bedouins, and Druze in addition to the Southern Europeans". And that :

The findings support the historical record of Middle Eastern Jews settling in North Africa during classical antiquity, converting non-Jews to Judaism and marrying local populations, thereby forming distinct populations that stayed largely intact for more than two millennia. [...] Two major subgroups within this overall population were identified – Moroccan/Algerian Jews and Djerban (Tunisian)/Libyan Jews. The two subgroups varied in their degree of European mixture, with Moroccan/Algerian Jews tending to be more related to Europeans, which most likely resulted from the expulsion of Sephardi Jews from Spain during the Inquisition starting in 1492.

Furthermore, "The Tunisian Jews exhibited two apparent clusters—one with proximity to Libyan and Djerban Jews and the other proximal to the Moroccan and Algerian Jews."

== Films and documentaries ==
- The Bible's Witness: The Jews of Djerba (1978) by Alain Cohen and Georges Nizan. French television. Documentary on the 2,500 year old community in Djerba and their culture and traditions.
- My Country Left Me (1995) by Karin Albou. Three generations of French Jews from Tunisia reflect on the pain of both exile and assimilation into France.
- Journey from Tunisia (2017) by Jonathan Maimon. Jewish memories of Tunisia from those born in Gabès, including life under the Nazi occupation in 1943.

== See also ==
- History of the Jews in Africa

=== Regions ===
- History of the Jews in Central Africa
- History of the Jews in East Africa
- History of the Jews in North Africa
- History of the Jews in Southern Africa
- History of the Jews in West Africa

=== Topics ===
- Arab Jews
- Maghrebi Jews
- Mizrahi Jews
- History of the Jews in Djerba
- Antisemitism by country#Tunisia
- Antisemitism in the Arab world#Tunisia
- Antisemitism in Islam
- History of the Jews under Muslim rule
- Islamic–Jewish relations
- Jewish exodus from the Muslim world
- Jews outside Europe under Nazi occupation
- Or Torah Synagogue in Acre, Israel
- Israeli people of Tunisian descent

== Bibliography ==
=== Jews of Tunisia ===
- Allagui, Abdelkirm (2016). Juifs et musulmans en Tunisie: Des origines à nos jours (in French). Paris: Taillandier. ISBN 979-10-210-2079-5.
- Jean-Pierre Allali (2003). Juifs de Tunisie (in French). Courbevoie: Soline. p. 160. ISBN 978-2-87677-472-8.
- Jean-Pierre Allali (2014). Les Juifs de Tunisie sous la botte allemande: Chronique d'un drame méconnu (in French). Paris: Glyphe. p. 330. ISBN 978-2-35815-119-1.
- Robert Attal [in French]; Claude Sitbon (1979). Regards sur les Juifs de Tunisie (in French). Paris: Albin Michel. p. 315. ISBN 978-2-226-00789-6.
- Colette Bismuth-Jarrassé; Dominique Jarrassé (2010). Synagogues de Tunisie: Monuments d'une histoire et d'une identité (in French). Le Kremlin-Bicêtre: Esthétiques du divers. p. 320. ISBN 978-2-9533041-2-1.
- David Cazès [in French] (1887). Essai sur l'histoire des Israélites de Tunisie: Depuis les temps les plus reculés jusqu'à l'établissement du protectorat de la France en Tunisie (in French). Paris: Armand Durlacher. p. 211.
- David Cazès [in French] (1893). Notes bibliographiques sur la littérature juive-tunisienne (in French). Tunis: Imprimerie internationale. p. 370.
- David Cohen [in French] (1995). Le parler arabe des Juifs de Tunis: Textes et documents linguistiques et ethnographiques (in French). Paris/La Haye: Mouton & Co. p. 177. ISBN 978-2-7132-0313-8.
- Denis Cohen-Tannoudji (2007). Entre Orient et Occident: Juifs et musulmans en Tunisie (in French). Paris: Éditions de l'éclat. p. 379. ISBN 978-2-84162-144-6.
- Georges Cohen (1993). De l'Ariana à Galata: Itinéraire d'un Juif de Tunisie (in French). Vincennes: Racines. p. 187. ISBN 978-2-9507375-0-2.
- Sonia Fellous [in French] (2003). Juifs et musulmans de Tunisie: Fraternité et déchirements (in French). Paris: Somogy. p. 493. ISBN 978-2-85056-632-5.
- Fenton, Paul B. (2003). "Un monument de la pensée juive en terre tunisienne : le commentaire kairouanais sur le Livre de la Création". In Sonia Fellous (ed.). Juifs et musulmans de Tunisie : fraternité et déchirements (in French). Paris: Somogy. ISBN 978-2-85056-632-5.
- Jacob André Guez (2001). Au camp de Bizerte: Journal d'un Juif tunisien interné sous l'occupation allemande, 1942-1943 (in French). Paris: L'Harmattan. p. 151. ISBN 978-2-296-16515-1.
- Kchir, Khaled (2003). "Entre Sarîa et pratiques : juifs et musulmans en Ifrîqiyya à travers la littérature juridique". In Sonia Fellous (ed.). Juifs et musulmans de Tunisie : fraternité et déchirements (in French). Paris: Somogy. ISBN 978-2-85056-632-5.
- Charles Haddad de Paz (1977). Juifs et Arabes au pays de Bourguiba (in French). Aix-en-Provence: Imprimerie Paul Roubaud. p. 287.
- Hagège, Claude; Zarca, Bernard (2001). "Les Juifs et la France en Tunisie. Les bénéfices d'une relation triangulaire". Le Mouvement social (197): 9–28. doi:10.2307/3780159. JSTOR 3780159.
- Hirschberg, Haim Ze'ev (1974). A History of the Jews in North Africa. Vol. 1. Brill. ISBN 9004038205.
- Jalloul, Néji (2003). "Les Juifs de Kairouan au Moyen Âge". In Sonia Fellous (ed.). Juifs et musulmans de Tunisie : fraternité et déchirements (in French). Paris: Somogy. ISBN 978-2-85056-632-5.
- Albert-Armand Maarek (2010). Les Juifs de Tunisie entre 1857 et 1958: Histoire d'une émancipation (in French). Paris: Glyphe. p. 290. ISBN 978-2-35815-033-0.
- Serge Moati [in French] (2003). Villa Jasmin (in French). Paris: Fayard. p. 396. ISBN 978-2-253-10851-1.
- Claire Rubinstein-Cohen (2011). Portrait de la communauté juive de Sousse, Tunisie: De l'orientalité à l'occidentalisation, un siècle d'histoire (1857-1957) (in French). Paris: Édilivre. p. 444. ISBN 978-2-812-13818-8.
- Saadoun, Haïm (2003). "L'influence du sionisme sur les relations judéo-musulmanes en Tunisie". In Sonia Fellous (ed.). Juifs et musulmans de Tunisie : fraternité et déchirements (in French). Paris: Somogy. ISBN 978-2-85056-632-5.
- Paul Sebag [in French] (1991). Histoire des Juifs de Tunisie: Des origines à nos jours (in French). Paris: L'Harmattan. p. 335. ISBN 978-2-296-24036-0.
- Paul Sebag [in French]; Robert Attal [in French] (1959). La hara de Tunis: L'évolution d'un ghetto nord-africain (in French). Paris: Presses universitaires de France. p. 92.
- Patrick Simon [in French]; Claude Tapia (1998). Le Belleville des Juifs tunisiens (in French). Paris: Autrement. p. 189. ISBN 978-2-86260-781-8.
- Hmida Toukabri (2002). Les Juifs dans la Tunisie médiévale, 909-1057: D'après les documents de la Geniza du Caire (in French). Paris: Romillat. p. 143. ISBN 978-2-87894-076-3.
- Lucette Valensi [in French]; Abraham Udovitch [in French] (1991). Juifs en terre d'islam: Les communautés de Djerba (in French). Paris: Archives contemporaines.
- Nava Sarah Yardéni (2010). Les Tunisraéliens: L'intégration des Juifs de Tunisie en Israël (in French). Jérusalem: Elkana. p. 346. ISBN 978-965-7417-07-2.
- Bernard Zarca (2005). Une enfance juive tunisoise (in French). Paris: L'Harmattan. p. 288. ISBN 978-2-7475-8406-7.
- Collectif (1989). Les Juifs en Tunisie: Images et textes (in French). Paris: Éditions du Scribe. p. 263. ISBN 978-2-86765-011-6.

=== Jews of the Maghreb ===
- Michel Abitbol [in French] (2012). Les Juifs d'Afrique du Nord sous Vichy (in French). Paris: CNRS éditions. p. 385. ISBN 978-2-271-07541-3.
- André Chouraqui [in French] (1998). Histoire des Juifs en Afrique du Nord, Volume I: En exil au Maghreb (in French). Paris: Éditions du Rocher. p. 293. ISBN 978-2-268-03105-7.
- André Chouraqui [in French] (1998). Histoire des Juifs en Afrique du Nord, Volume II: Retour en Orient (in French). Paris: Éditions du Rocher. p. 340. ISBN 978-2-268-03106-4.
- Mark R. Cohen (2008). Sous le croissant et sous la croix: Les Juifs au Moyen Âge (in French). Translated by Jean-Pierre Ricard. Paris: Éditions du Seuil. p. 464. ISBN 978-2-02-081579-6.
- Fenton, Paul B.; Littman, David G. (2010). L'Exil au Maghreb: La condition juive sous l'islam, 1148-1912 (in French). Paris: Sorbonne Université Presses. ISBN 978-2-84050-725-3.
- Paul Monceaux [in French] (1902). "Les colonies juives dans l'Afrique romaine". Revue des études juives (in French). 44 (87): 1–28. doi:10.3406/rjuiv.1902.4541. ISSN 0484-8616.
- Effy Tselikas; Lina Hayoun (2004). Les lycées français du soleil: Creusets cosmopolites de la Tunisie, de l'Algérie et du Maroc (in French). Paris: Autrement. p. 272. ISBN 978-2-7467-0435-0.
- Taïeb, Jacques (2000). Sociétés juives du Maghreb moderne (1500–1900) (in French). Paris: Maisonneuve et Larose. p. 223. ISBN 978-2-7068-1467-9.
- Taïeb, Jacques (1994). Être juif au Maghreb à la veille de la colonisation (in French). Paris: Albin Michel. p. 144. ISBN 978-2-226-06802-6.
- Shmuel Trigano [in French] (2006). Le Monde sépharade, Volume I: Histoire (in French). Paris: Éditions du Seuil. p. 1008. ISBN 978-2-02-086992-8.
- Shmuel Trigano [in French] (2006). Le Monde sépharade, Volume II: Civilisation (in French). Paris: Éditions du Seuil. p. 816. ISBN 978-2-02-086993-5.
- Colette Zytnicki [in French] (2011). Les Juifs du Maghreb: Naissance d'une historiographie coloniale (in French). Paris: Sorbonne Université Presses. p. 391. ISBN 978-2-84050-782-6.

=== Further reading ===
- Tobi, Tsivia (2016). Yosef Tobi (ed.). From bride to mother-in-law: The world of Jewish women in southern Tunisia and its reflection in popular literature (in Hebrew). Jerusalem: Ben-Zvi Institute. ISBN 9789652351906. OCLC 951011735.
- Tobi, Tsivia (2020). Ornaments of Tarshish: The Attire and the Jewelry of the Jewish Women in Tunisia (in Hebrew). Jerusalem: Misgav Yerushalayim, The Hebrew University. OCLC 1142832305.
- Koskas, Sonia (2015) [2007]. Contes des Juifs de Tunisie. Aux origines du monde (in French). Vol. 13. Primento. ISBN 9782373800203.
