= Nehorai Garmon =

Rabbi and poet of Ottoman Trpolitania

- נהוראי ג׳רמון
- Born: c. 1682; Tripoli, Ottoman Tripolitania
- Died: 1760; Tunis, Ottoman Tripolitania
- Occupations: Rabbi, poet
- Writing career
- Language: Hebrew

Nehorai Garmon (Hebrew: נהוראי ג׳רמון; c. 1682–1760) was a rabbi and poet from Ottoman Tripolitania.

Born in Tripoli, Garmon went to Tunis at the age of twenty, and studied Talmud under Isaac Lumbroso, whom he succeeded in the rabbinate. He was the author of Yeter ha-Baz, published posthumously in Livorno in 1787, consisting of novellæ on the Talmud and on Maimonides' Mishneh Torah. Printed with the work are eleven poems of the author, and the novellæ of his son Ḥayyim (d. 1781). Garmon lost a large part of his writings in an attack on the Jewish quarter.
