= List of terrorist incidents in Tunisia =

Following is a list of major incidents involving terror groups operating in Tunisia. Note: the perpetrators are not counted in the dead or wounded below. These are all radical Islamic terrorism unless otherwise noted.

| Date | Type | Dead | Injured | Location and description |
|---|---|---|---|---|
| 26 January 1980 | Attack | 48 | 30 | 1980 Gafsa Uprising – It was a planned coup by Tunisian opponents who leaked from Tebessa in Algeria to Gafsa with the help of Libya and Algeria. The people of Gafsa rejected this coup, and the Tunisian army took control of the situation, which severely affected Tunisia's relations with Libya and Algeria. |
| 2 August 1987 | Attack | 38 | 13 | On 2 August 1987, members of the Islamic Tendency Movement bombed hotels in Sousse and Monastir at the same time, which caused the death of 38 people. |
| 11 February 1995 | Attack | 7 | 0 | Sundus attack – On 11 February 1995, an Algerian Armed Islamic Group attacks National Guard border crossing, killing all seven guards who were on the spot. |
| 11 April 2002 | Suicide bombing | 19 | 30+ | Ghriba synagogue bombing – On 11 April 2002, a natural gas truck fitted with explosives drove past security barriers at the ancient El Ghriba synagogue on the Tunisian island of Djerba. The truck detonated at the front of the synagogue, killing 14 German tourists, three Tunisians, and two French nationals. More than 30 others were wounded. |
| 6 June 2013 | Bombing | 2 | 2 | Two Tunisian Army soldiers were killed and two others injured after their vehicle hit an IED near Jebel ech Chambi, close to the border with Algeria. |
| 18 March 2015 | Shooting | 22 | 50 | Bardo National Museum attack – Three terrorists attacked the Bardo National Museum in the Tunisian capital city of Tunis, taking hostages. 22 people, mostly European tourists, were killed and another fifty injured. A few days later police raided a hideout of Al-Qaeda in the Islamic Maghreb. |
| 26 June 2015 | Shooting | 38 | 38 | 2015 Sousse attacks – Thirty-eight people, mostly British tourists, were killed when a gunman attacked two hotels at the tourist resort at Port El Kantaoui, about 10 km north of the city of Sousse, Tunisia. |
| 24 November 2015 | Suicide bombing | 13 | 16 | 2015 Tunis bombing – A suicide bomber attacked a bus carrying members of the Tunisian presidential guard, killing 13, on a principal road in Tunis. ISIL claimed responsibility for the attack. |
| 5 November 2016 | Shooting | 1 | 0 | A Tunisian soldier was killed in his home. |
| 22 August 2017 | Bombing | 0 | 2 | An IED blast wounded two soldiers on patrol in the heights of Kasserine. |
| 8 July 2018 | Shooting | 6 | 3 | Six members of the Tunisian security forces were killed and another three injured in an ambush in the area of Aïn Soltane in the Tunisian governorate of Jendouba near the border with Algeria. Al-Qaeda in the Islamic Maghreb claimed responsibility. |
| 28 June 2019 | Suicide attack | 2 | 8 | 2019 Tunis bombings – Two suicide bombers killed one policemen and injured 9 others. The bombings happened near the French embassy in Tunis. A policeman died of his injuries a few days later. |
| 6 March 2020 | Suicide bombing | 1 | 6 | Two suicide bombers killed a police officer and injured five others plus a female civilian near the American embassy in Tunis. |
| 6 September 2020 | Knife attack | 1 | 1 | A National Guard officer was killed and another wounded in a knife attack in the centre of Sousse perpetrated by three assailants who were shot dead. |
| 3 February 2021 | Bombing | 4 | 0 | A landmine blast killed four Tunisian soldiers during a counter-terrorism operation in Mount Mghila. |
| 9 May 2023 | Shooting | 5 | 9 | 2023 Djerba shooting – During an annual Jewish pilgrimage to the island of Djerba, a guard from a naval center fatally shot a colleague before heading to the El Ghriba synagogue and opening fire. The attack resulted in the deaths of two civilians and a security guard, and left ten others injured. Security personnel responded quickly, shooting and killing the assailant. |

== See also ==
- List of attacks on Jewish institutions
