= Shaul Kohen =

Bension Kohen
- Born: Djerba, Tunisia
- Died: 1848; Jerusalem, Israel
- Resting place: Djerba, Tunisia - exhumed and Buried in Israel
- Known for: Hebrew grammar work "Lechem HaBikurim"
- Title: Rabbi

Shaul HaKohen Kohen (? in Djerba, Tunisia – 1848, also in Djerba) was a Mizrahi Jewish rabbi, and writer of multiple rabbinic literary works.

== Lineage ==
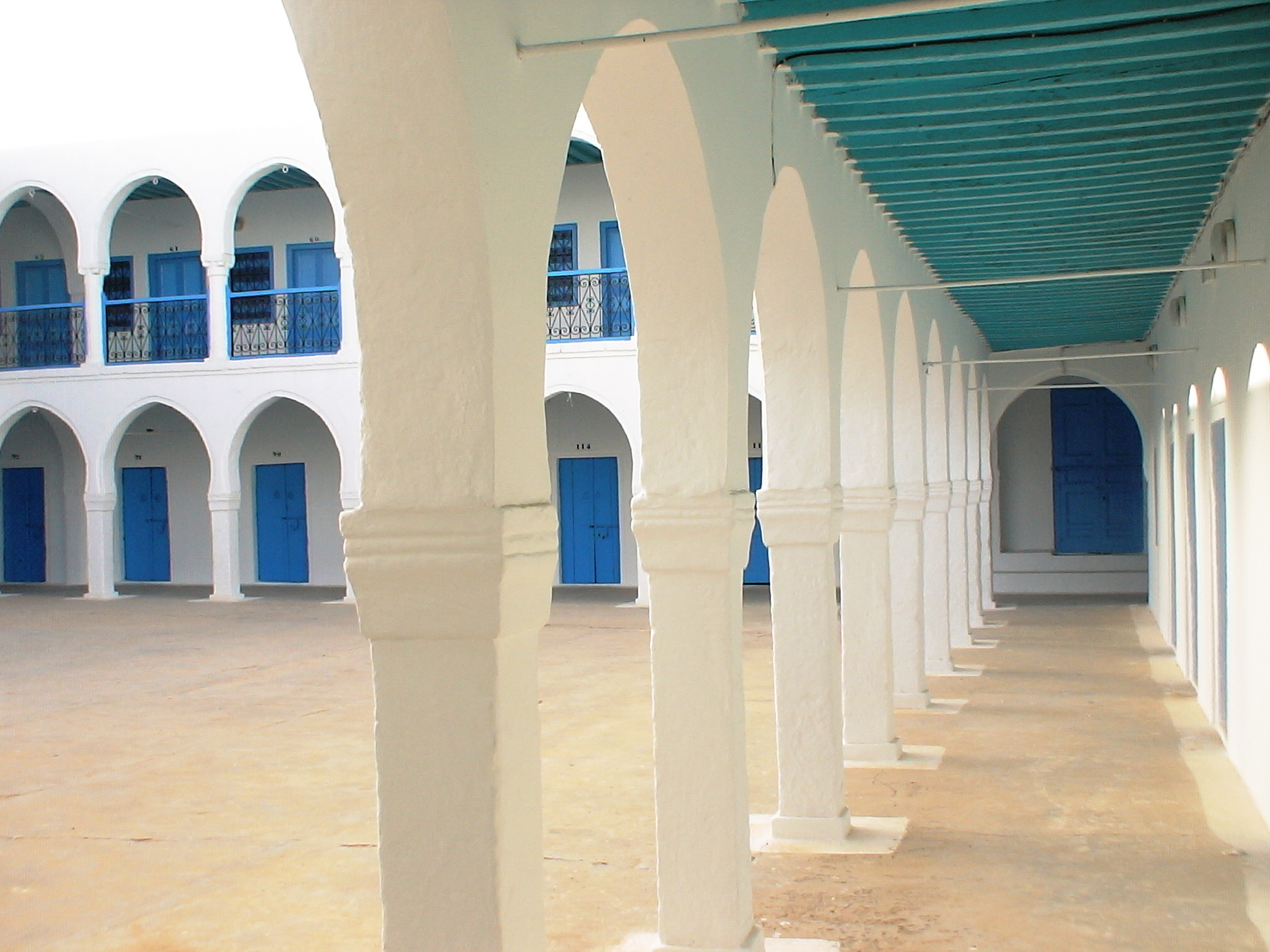
Courtyard of the El Ghriba synagogue in Djerba, Tunisia

In the introduction to his work, the Rabbi provided a detailed lineage going back over a dozen generations of kohanim born at Djerba,

1. Son of Mussa Cohen בן מוסה כהן,
2. Son of Bakhtuth Cohen בן בכתות כהן,
3. Son of Michael Cohen בן מיכאל כהן,
4. Son of Pinhas Cohen בן פינחס כהן,
5. Son of Bagdidi Cohen בן בגדידי כהן,
6. Son of Burathi Cohen בן בוראתי כהן,
7. Son of Tamam Cohen בן תמאם כהן,
8. Son of Amram Cohen בן עמרם כהן,
9. Son of Mevorakh Cohen בן מבורך כהן,
10. Son of Shlomo Cohen בן שלמה כהן,
11. Son of Bagdid Cohen בן בגדיד כהן,
12. Son of Khalfa Cohen בן כלפא כהן,
13. Son of Se'yeed Cohen בן סעייד כהן,
14. Son of Pinhas Cohen בן פינחס כהן,
15. Son of Avraham Cohen בן אברהם כהן,
16. Son of Moshe Cohen בן משה כהן,
17. Son of Shlomo Cohen בן שלמה כהן,
18. Son of Peretz Cohen בן פרץ כהן,
19. Son of Mussa Cohen בן מוסה כהן,
20. Son of Shaul Cohen בן שאול כהן,
21. Son of Yisrael Cohen בן ישראל כהן,
22. Son of Bagdid Cohen בן בגדיד כהן,
23. Son of Hizkiya Cohen בן חזקיה כהן,
24. Son of Matithya Cohen בן מתתיה כהן,
25. Son of Yitzhak HaCohen "the elder, the exilee".

From this point onward, the manuscript traces back to Ezra HaSofer, yet the handwriting was found to be illegible.

== Burial in Israel ==
Some 150 years after his passing, the Rabbi was exhumed from his burial place in Djerba, and buried in Israel.

== Bibliography ==
- Lechem HaBikurim (p. Livorno, 1870)
- Yad Shaul (p. Djerba, 1916)
- Binah Le'Itim)

== See also ==
- El Ghriba synagogue
