= Ghriba synagogue bombing =

2002 Islamist suicide bombing of a synagogue in Tunisia

Coordinates: 33°48′50″N 10°51′33″E

- Part of the Insurgency in the Maghreb (2002–present)
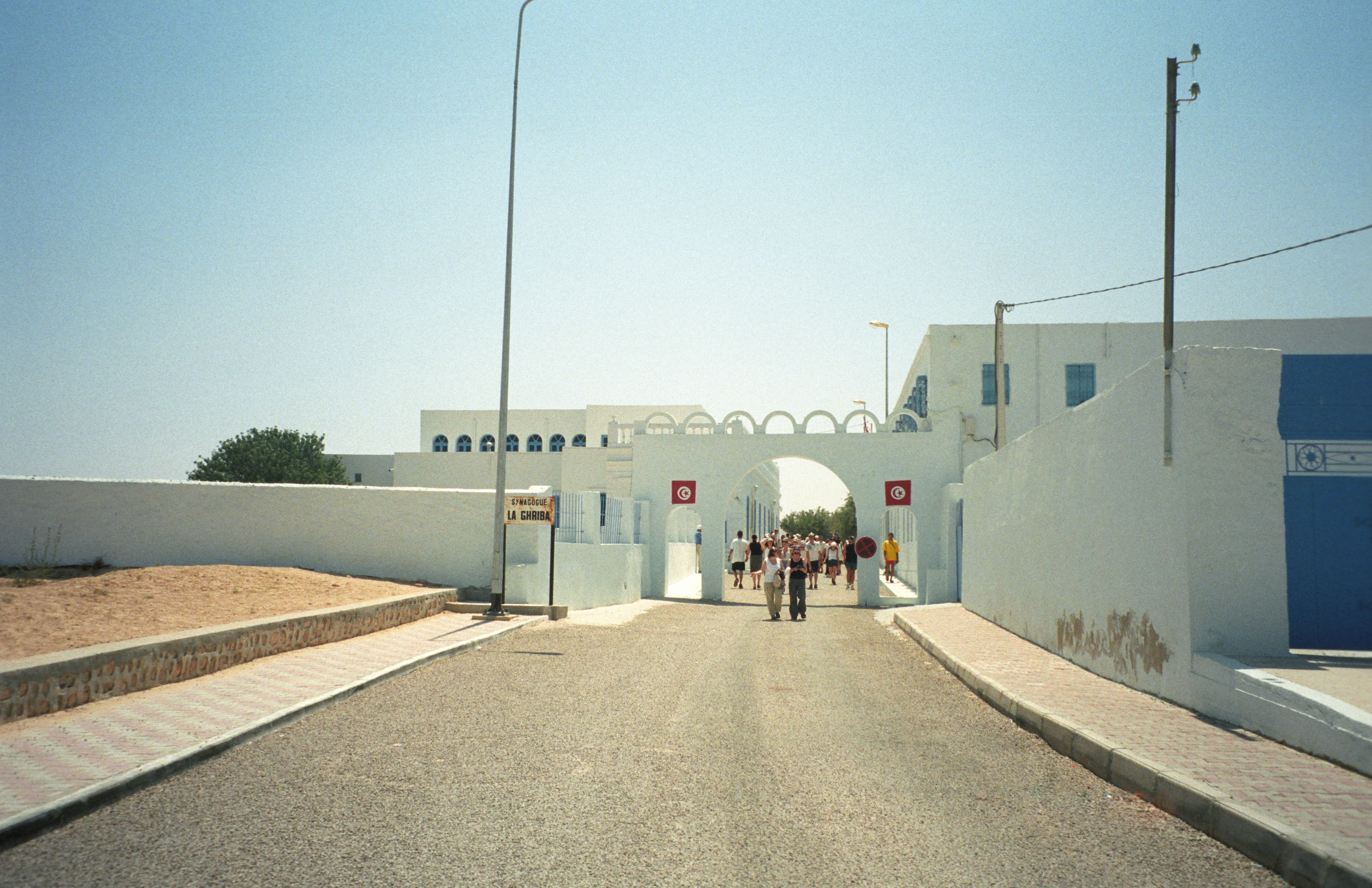
- Synagogue entrance through which the fuel tanker drove during attack
- Location: Djerba, Tunisia
- Date: 11 April 2002; 24 years ago
- Target: El Ghriba synagogue
- Attack type: Suicide bombing
- Weapon: Natural gas truck bomb
- Deaths: 20 (including the perpetrator)
- Injuries: 30+
- Perpetrator: al-Qaeda
- Motive: al-Qaeda claim: revenge for the deaths of Palestinians

The Ghriba synagogue bombing was carried out by Niser bin Muhammad Nasr Nawar on the El Ghriba synagogue in Tunisia in 2002.

== Background ==
The El Ghriba synagogue in Djerba is the oldest synagogue in Africa.

== Preparations for the bombing ==
Nawar remained in Canada until February 2002, when he and several others traveled to Tunisia to prepare for the attack. He told his family that the others were from the travel agency. Nawar worked at a legitimate travel agency under the alias Seif el-Islam Ettounsi while in Tunisia, where he constructed the "crude" bomb for the attack himself. During this time, he often stayed with his uncle Belgasem Nawar, who purchased the truck that was eventually used in the bombing. Just before the attack, he mailed a letter to Al-Quds Al-Arabi in which he took responsibility for the attack in the name of al-Qaeda.

== Bombing ==
On 11 April 2002, a natural gas truck fitted with explosives drove past security barriers at the ancient El Ghriba Synagogue on the Tunisian island of Djerba. Nawar and a colleague drove the truck loaded with natural gas canisters behind a German tourist bus near the synagogue. Nawar then used a cell phone belonging to his brother, to phone Christian Ganczarski, whom he asked to pray for him. He also had a phone call with Khalid Sheikh Mohammed. After his colleague fled the scene on foot, Nawar detonated the explosives. The truck detonated at the front of the synagogue, killing 14 German tourists, five Tunisians, and two French nationals. More than 30 others were wounded.

Deaths by nationality
Country	Number
Germany	14
Tunisia	3
France	2
Total	19

Although the explosion was initially called an accident, as Tunisia, France, and Germany investigated, it became clear that it was a deliberate attack. Following the blast, Tunisian officials identified his remains through dental records. 24-year-old man Nawar was identified as the suicide bomber who carried out the attack with the aid of a relative.

Al-Qaeda later claimed responsibility for the attack. which was reportedly organized by Khalid Sheikh Mohammed and Saad bin Laden. However, Saad's family denied he was involved in the attack.

== Arrests ==
In March 2003, five people were arrested in Spain in connection with the attack. On May 10, 2006, two of them, Spanish businessman Enrique Cerda and Pakistani national Ahmed Rukhsar, were sentenced to five years in prison for collaborating with a terrorist group. In June 2003, a German man named Christian Ganczarski was arrested at the Charles de Gaulle airport in Paris in connection with the bombing. He was arrested by a joint intelligence operation, in the frame of Alliance Base, which is located in Paris, and transferred to Fresnes Prison in Paris. In February 2009, Ganczarski was sentenced to 18 years in prison for the bombing.

== Aftermath ==
Then Tunisian president Zine El Abidine Ben Ali replaced both ministers in charge of internal security two weeks after the attack, having Hedi M'henni replace Abdallah Kaabi as Minister of the Interior, and Mohamed Hedi ben Hassine replace Mohamed Ali Ganzaoui as head of National Security.

In June 2002, Sulaiman Abu Ghaith spoke on al-Jazeera to confirm that the attack was carried out by Nizar Nawar with al-Qaeda's help, since Nawar "could not see his Palestinian brothers killed while Jews walked freely in Djerba to enjoy themselves and practice their religion". The Boston Globe stated that his residence in Canada proved "that Canada, despite new antiterrorist measures approved by Parliament under intense pressure from the United States, remains an important haven for bin Laden's operatives"

Seven months after the attack, his parents, brother and brother-in-law were arrested in France under anti-terrorism laws, while authorities investigated if they had any connection to the bombing. There were reports that Nawar had written his brother a letter urging him to "finish what he had started, and die a martyr".

== Commemoration of the victims ==
On 11 April 2012, Tunisian President Moncef Marzouki, Tunisian Grand Rabbi Haim Bitan, the Ambassador of the Federal Republic of Germany to Tunisia, and Boris Boillon, Ambassador of the French Republic to Tunisia, visited Djerba to pay their respects to the victims on the attack's 10th anniversary. Marzouki met with victims' families and delivered a speech where he strongly condemned this attack and reassured Tunisian Jews of their place in Tunisian society.

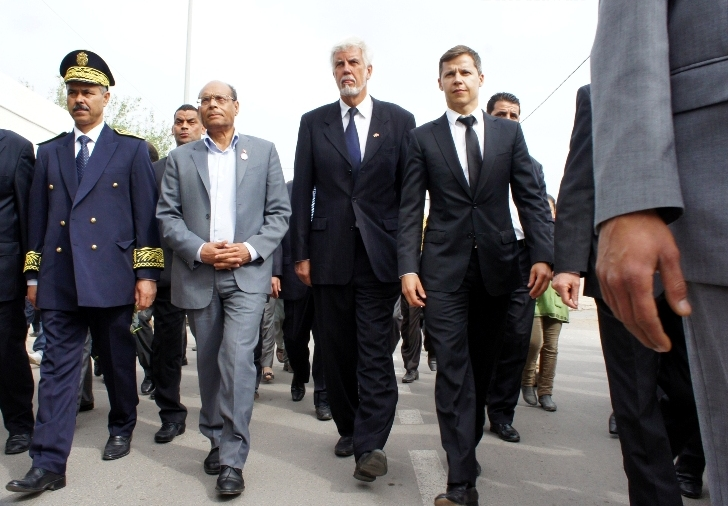
Silent march

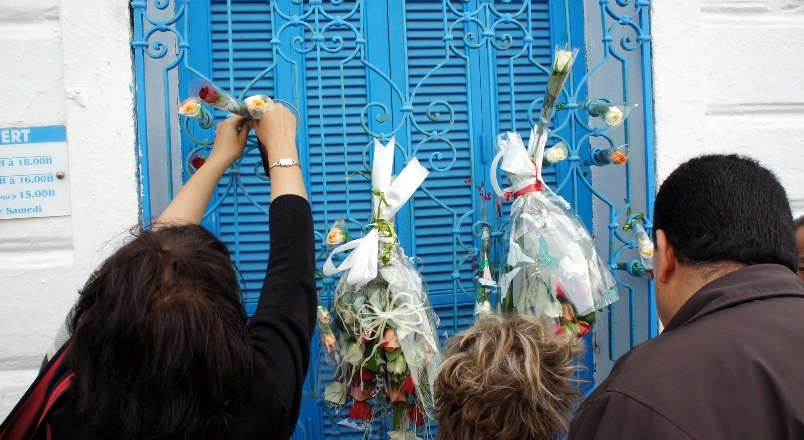
Flowers laid for those killed in the attack

== Niser bin Muhammad Nasr Nawar ==
Nizar bin Muhammad Nasar Nawar (1978–2002), an alleged member of the Tunisian Combat Group, was accused of carrying out the bombing, after planning its execution while living in Montreal, Canada.

Raised by his mother in Ben Gardane, Nizar Nawar was a "mediocre" student who never completed high school. His father, who moved to Lyon, France, in 1971, visited the family routinely, but was unable to help his son gain an entry visa to France in 1999, since he could not prove he had the financial capacity to support him. Nizar Nawar was not considered religious, as he drank alcohol and wore un-Islamic clothing, while traveling to Libya to purchase cheap trinkets that he sold in Tunisian markets. In 1999, Nizar Nawar told his family he was travelling to South Korea to work in restaurants. Nine months later he phoned his parents "very bitter, very angry", and explained he had no money and said the restaurant had refused to pay him. He asked them to help him fly back to Tunisia. Upon returning to Tunisia, Nawar moved to Montreal, where he told his family he'd been accepted into a travel agency school.

In 2001, his father moved the remaining family members to France.

== See also ==
- Antisemitism in Islam
- Djerba shooting – 2023 shooting in Djerba, Tunisia
- History of the Jews in Tunisia
- List of terrorist incidents in Tunisia
- Second Intifada (2000–2005) in Palestine and Israel
