= Sundus attack =

1995 terror attack in Tunisia

- Part of Algerian Civil War
- Location: Sundus, Tunisia
- Date: 11 February 1995
- Target: Tunisian National Guard
- Deaths: 6 guards
- Perpetrator: Armed Islamic Group of Algeria

The Sundus attack was a raid by Algerian Islamist militias on the National Guard office in Sundus (near Tamerza) in Tunisia on 11 February 1995. All six of the Tunisian paramilitary national guards were killed, and the Algerian Islamists seized the garrison's weapons and ammunition. This was the first time Tunisia was attacked by Islamists since the start of the Algerian Civil War in 1991. The Tunisian government denied this incident and claimed that the soldiers died in a car accident out of fear that it would damage tourism and foreign investment. The Armed Islamic Group of Algeria claimed responsibility for this incident a few days later and said it was a message to Tunisian authorities for oppressing Islamists. Another reason for this is that Tunisian authorities engaged in a large operation with the Algerian military against Islamist insurgents. Two similar incidents occurred in al-Kaf and 'Ayn al-Darahim.
