= 2023 Djerba synagogue shooting =

2023 shooting in Djerba, Tunisia

- Location: El Ghriba Synagogue, Djerba, Tunisia
- Date: May 9, 2023
- Attack type: Mass shooting
- Weapons: Steyr AUG rifle Glock handgun
- Deaths: 6 (including the perpetrator)
- Injuries: 8
- Victims: Three members of the gendarmarie and two civilians
- Perpetrator: Wissam Khazri

On May 9, 2023, Wissam Khazri, a 30-year-old national guardsman, killed five people in a mass shooting at the El Ghriba Synagogue in Djerba, Tunisia. Khazri initially killed a colleague and seized his ammunition before targeting the synagogue, where a large gathering of Jewish pilgrims were celebrating Lag BaOmer. Two visitors and two Tunisian police officers were killed, while eight others sustained injuries before the perpetrator was killed by the police.

Tunisian Interior Minister Kamel Fekih reported that authorities had determined Khazri had targeted the synagogue in a premeditated attack, but they had not identified a motive.

== Background ==
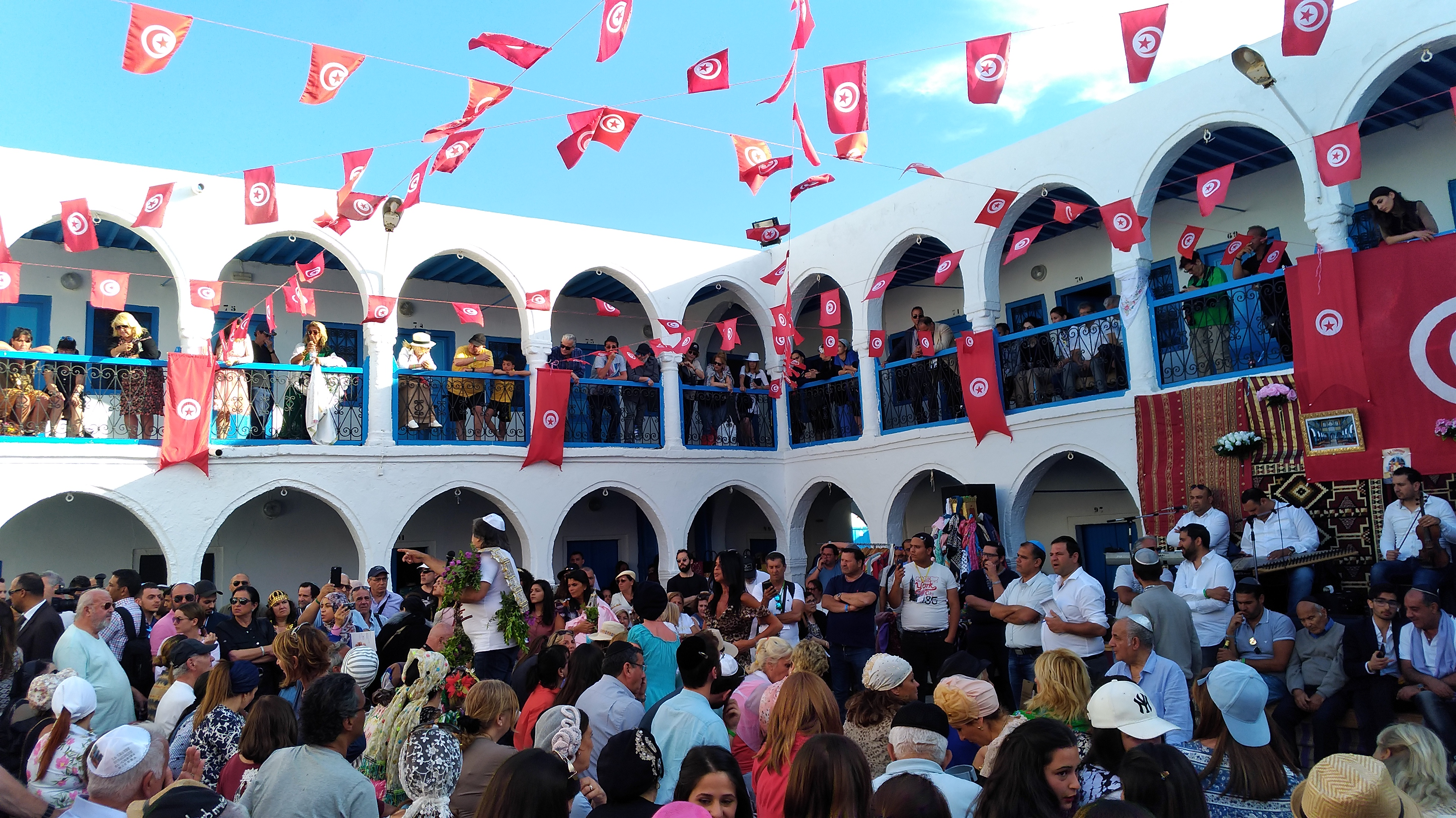
Pilgrims in 2019

The El Ghriba Synagogue on the island of Djerba is Africa's oldest synagogue and the site of an annual pilgrimage that attracts thousands of Jewish visitors from Europe and Israel. The synagogue has been targeted by Islamist militants and has previously experienced attacks. In 1985, three people were killed and 11 wounded during the festival of Simchat Torah when a local policeman responsible for guarding the synagogue fired into a crowd of Jews. In 2002, al-Qaeda militants attacked the synagogue with a truck bomb, resulting in the deaths of 21 people. Since then, the number of pilgrims has not reached 10,000 attendants as it once did. Security measures have been put in place to prevent such attacks and the pilgrimage is seen as an annual test for Tunisian security forces. Tunisia has a sizeable Jewish community of around 1,800 members, with hundreds in Djerba. The country's last major attack took place in 2020 when an explosion outside the US embassy killed one security officer.

== Attack ==
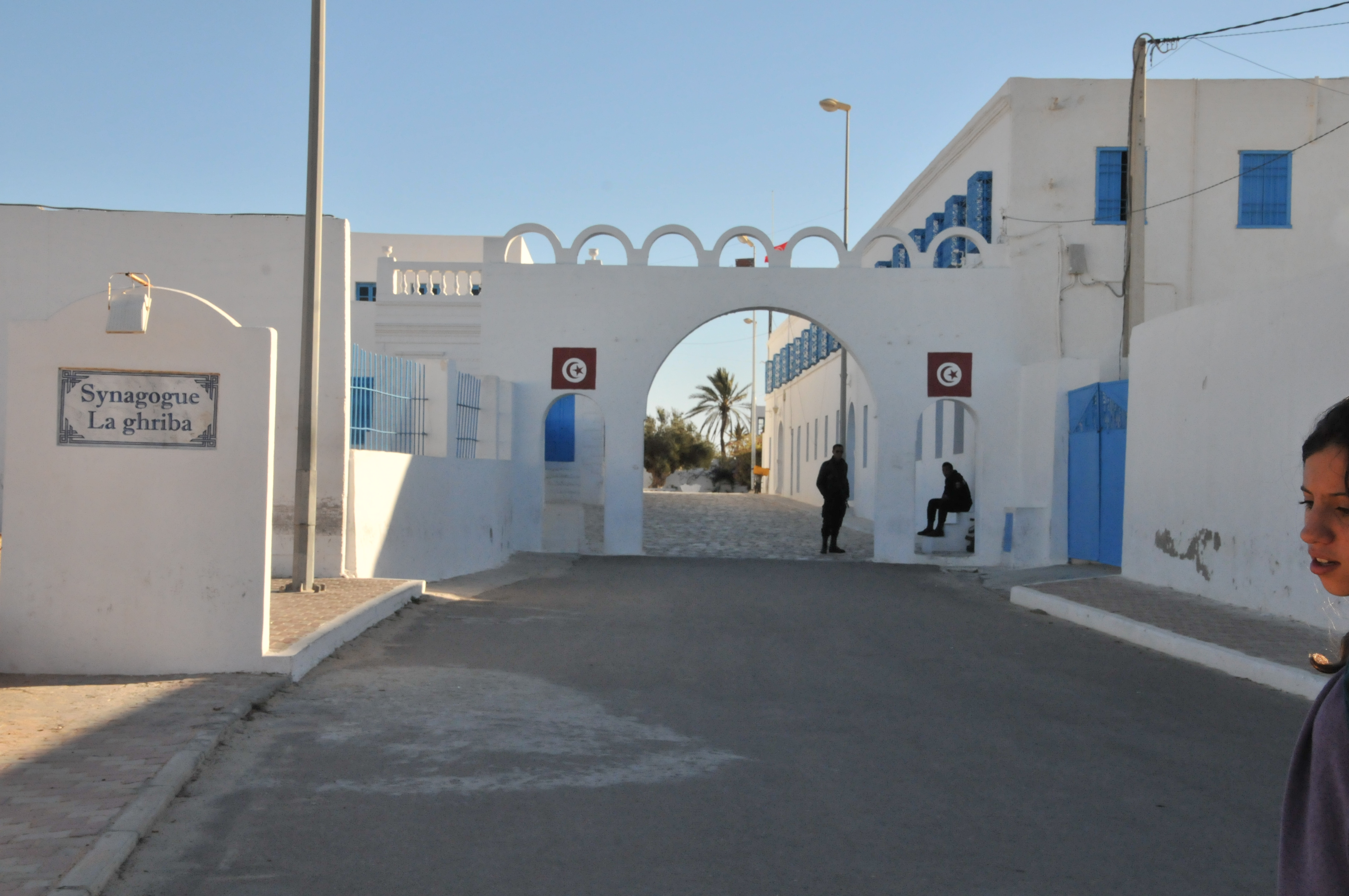
Entrance of synagogue

At around 7 PM, 30-year-old Wissam Khazri, a member of the Tunisian National Guard, fatally shot his colleague with a pistol at the naval center in Aghir. Armed with an automatic weapon and his colleague's ammunition, he headed towards the synagogue located roughly 20 km from the center. He arrived on a quad bike wearing body armor and parked the bike in a schoolyard about 200 meters away from the synagogue, which contained a few hundred worshipers at the time as festivities for the Jewish holiday of Lag Baomer were concluding. As he moved away from the schoolyard, and after monitoring the movements of a traffic police vehicle parked nearby, he opened fire indiscriminately at security units at around 8:13 PM, killing two worshipers who attempted to hide behind a nearby bus, as well as two police officers. He was immediately surrounded by security forces and shot dead before he could reach the entrance of synagogue, which was subsequently locked down. According to the interior minister, the gunman was killed two minutes after his arrival. Most tourists had already left the synagogue at the time of the shooting. According to organizers, more than 5,000 people were participating in this 2023's pilgrimage.

The victims were identified as cousins — a 30-year-old man of Israeli-Tunisian descent, who worked as a local goldsmith, and a 42-year-old man of French-Tunisian heritage, who had come to partake in the celebrations of the pilgrimage. They died at the scene, as did one of the police officers, while a second police officer succumbed to his injuries later in the hospital. The Ministry of the Interior reported four civilians and four officers injured, including one hospitalized in critical condition.

Tunisian authorities stated that the attack was premeditated and targeted the synagogue, but gave no explanation for his motives. Aaron Zelin, a senior fellow at The Washington Institute for Near East Policy, who specializes in analyzing Islamist extremism in Tunisia, noted that the attack appeared to be an isolated incident and lacked the same level of organization as the 2002 attack on the synagogue. According to him, the attack was not sophisticated, and there is a possibility that it was carried out by a lone individual without a broader plot or planning.

== Reactions ==
=== Domestic ===
In the days following the attack, President Kais Saied described it as a "criminal" act aimed to create division and harm the tourism sector rather than terrorism. Officials gave few details beyond identifying the assailant and calling the assault premeditated. According to historian Habib Kazdaghli, the government "didn’t know how to respond" because "the attack targeted Jewish people and ... took place at El Ghriba." Hamza Meddeb of the Carnegie Middle East Centre noted that acknowledging antisemitism would raise uncomfortable questions about the attacker's position as a police officer and wider societal attitudes, while Grzegorz Kapuscinski of Oxford Brookes University suggested that concerns for the country's image as a safe destination could explain the government's framing of the attack.

Authorities worked quickly to reassure tourists about the country's safety. Security around religious sites, including synagogues, was heightened. On May 13, Saied denied the attack being driven by antisemitism, defended laws protecting Jewish rights, and cited his family's history of aiding Tunisian Jews. He criticized double standards in addressing the Palestinian issue and labeled accusations of antisemitism as distortions of history, accusing conspirators against the state. On May 17, Saied met religious leaders from various faiths, including the chief rabbi, Christian archbishop, and Muslim mufti, and assured safety for places of worship.

The Ministry of the Interior launched an investigation to determine the motive behind the attack. As the incident occurred at a religious event and at a location of significance to the Jewish community, some observers, including several prominent Tunisian Jewish expats, speculated that the shooter may have been specifically targeting the island's Jewish community. Tunisian authorities acknowledge that the suspect had the intention to harm as many people as possible.

The Jewish community in Djerba condemned the decision of Tunisian authorities to move the bodies of the two Jewish civilians killed to Tunis for an autopsy. The victims' families and relatives protested outside the hospital where the bodies were transferred, stating that they were not allowed to honor their traditions by reciting verses from the Torah in respect of those killed. The incident caused unrest among the Tunisian Jewish community, with a few expressing frustration and hopelessness about staying in the country. Concerns were also raised about the future of the Jewish pilgrimage.

On 16 February 2026, five people, including Khazri's fiancée and sister, were sentenced to up to 15 years' imprisonment on charges of involvement in the attack.

=== International ===
The Israeli Ministry of Foreign Affairs expressed its condemnation of the killings and extended its condolences to victims' families and the Jewish community in Tunisia while pledging to work towards safeguarding the security of all Israelis who are abroad. Foreign Minister Eli Cohen expressed his sorrow and assured Tunisian Chief Rabbi Haim Bitan that the ministry would continue to support the community and provide whatever assistance is required. Israeli Minister of Diaspora Affairs Amichai Chikli stated that according to his office "the incident was preceded by a tense period of shouts and harassment of the Jewish community at the site". According to reporting by The Jerusalem Post, Israeli authorities and the Jewish Agency for Israel had been monitoring a serious threat against the Jewish community in Djerba for several months prior to the attack. The newspaper also reported the existence of a secret plan for massive emigration, but it is unclear whether the Jewish community members in Tunisia were interested in moving to Israel. A senior official at The Jewish Agency denied the existence of such a plan.

The French national anti-terrorism prosecutor's office (Parquet national antiterroriste) opened an investigation into the death of the French-Tunisian victim. The investigation was entrusted to the General Directorate for Internal Security. French President Emmanuel Macron expressed his sorrow over the attack on the Ghriba synagogue and conveyed his condolences to the victims and the Tunisian people. He also committed to persisting in the fight "against anti-Semitic hatred". The French Foreign Ministry expressed its deep sadness and paid tribute to the quick intervention of the Tunisian security forces. The Israelite Central Consistory of France also condemned the shooting, describing it as "cowardly and heinous".

The day before the attack, Deborah Lipstadt, U.S. Special Envoy to Monitor and Combat Antisemitism, participated in a ceremony at the synagogue alongside Tunisian officials and US Ambassador to Tunisia Joey R. Hood. She expressed that she was "sickened and heartbroken by the lethal, antisemitic attack targeting the Ghriba synagogue in Djerba during the Lag B’Omer celebrations". United States Department of State spokesman Matthew Miller condemned the shooting, expressed condolences to the Tunisian people, and praised "the rapid action of Tunisian security forces".

The European Jewish Congress expressed its “shock and outrage”. President Ariel Muzicant stated that "terror attacks continue to target Jews around the world even when they are gathered in prayer, as we know from countless experiences over the years including at this very synagogue". Rabbi Pinchas Goldschmidt, president of the Conference of European Rabbise, expressed his gratitude and admiration for the security services and emphasized the need for the world to come together and "loudly condemn yet another cowardly attack on Jews at worship". He later condemned statements made by President Saied on 13 May, and called for European governments to denounce them, expressing concern for the safety of Tunisia's Jewish community.
