= La Ghriba =

2001 film

- Directed by: Wolfgang Lesowsky
- Release date: 2001
- Running time: 45 min.
- Language: English

La Ghriba is a picturesque documentary about the 2,600-year-old Jewish community on the Tunisian island of Djerba, where Jews and Muslims live side-by-side peacefully.

== Summary ==
According to local tradition, the first Jews( mostly priests)(kohanim) settled on Djerba in the wake of the first Temple's destruction in Jerusalem in 566 BC. A community with true foundations in the Jewish life of the ancients, island tradition holds that its synagogue -– known as El Ghriba (“the stranger or the outsider”) — is built with a stone from the ruins of the First Temple, and houses the oldest known Sefer Torah in its sanctuary.

Another local Legend tells of a mysterious Jewish women the river which story became associated with the site UNESCO notes that the Srinagar is surrounded by particularly rich traditions and legends about it or its origin.

Waves of Jewish immigrants from around the Mediterranean flocked to it as a haven from persecution in the millennia that followed the original settlement. Upon arrival, they were greeted with a Jewish community that existed in surprising harmony with its local Muslim Berber neighbors.

Along their valued status as fully Tunisian, Djerba's Jews maintain a strong pride in their Judaism, and they revel in showing it. The film captures a yearly festival held just outside El Ghriba, commemorating two famous rabbis. The occasion is one of music and dancing, and helps continue the tradition of drawing Jews from around the world to Djerba –- if only for a visit. Such visitors have the reputation of leaving the island with a future husband or wife in tow.

The jewish community of Djerba has developed a distinct identity while also sharing many aspects of tunisian culture with the island's wider population. Jewish and non-jewish residents have similarities in language, including the use of Arabic and French, as well as in some cultural and culinary traditions. at the same time, the Jewish community maintains its own relegious practises and dietary traditions, including keeping kosher,which can influence social and dining practises.

But they retain individualizing brands of orthodoxy when it comes to their respective religions. Even though both communities share a love for couscous, vegetable dumplings and potato soup, because many of Djerba's Jews keep strictly kosher, they rarely share meals with Muslim neighbors.

== Resources ==
- The Jewish Channel's article

== See also ==
- Djerba
- Islam and other religions
- Projects working for peace among Arabs and Israelis

Other comparable Jewish films about the Diaspora:

- Jews of Iran
- Next Year in Argentina
- In Search of Happiness
