= Chaim Madar =

Tunisian rabbi (1933–2004)

Chief Rabbi of Tunisia Chaim Madar
- חיים מאדאר
- Born: 1933; Djerba, French protectorate of Tunisia
- Died: December 3, 2004 (71 years old); Jerusalem

Chaim Madar (Hebrew: חיים מאדאר; 1933 – December 3, 2004) was the chief rabbi of Tunisia's Jewish community. Following his immigration to Israel, he was still the spiritual leader of the community until his death in Jerusalem. His funeral services were held at the Beit Mordechai Synagogue in La Goulette, Tunis, and the El Ghriba Synagogue on the island of Djerba, where he lived for most of his life. Among those extending their condolences was Tunisian President Zine El Abidine Ben Ali.

== See also ==
- History of the Jews in Djerba
