= El Ghriba Synagogue =

Orthodox synagogue on Djerba, Tunisia

- Arabic: كنيس الغريبة
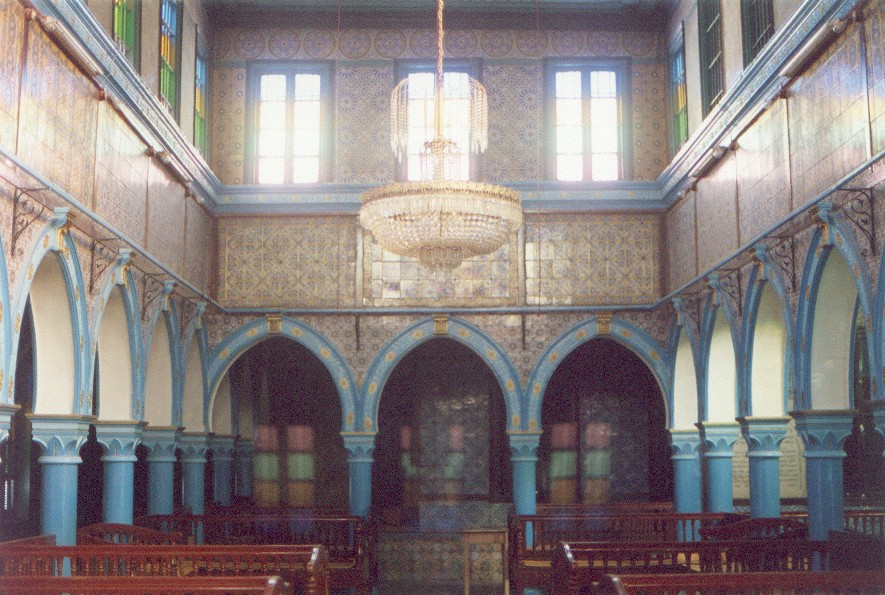
- The synagogue interior, in 2007

- Location of the synagogue in Tunisia

Religion
- Affiliation: Judaism
- Rite: Maghrebi (Tochavim)
- Ecclesiastical or organisational status: Synagogue; Pilgrimage site
- Status: Active

Location
- Location: Er Riadh, Djerba
- Country: Tunisia
- Coordinates: 33°48′50″N 10°51′34″E

Architecture
- Type: Synagogue architecture
- Style: Moorish
- Established: 6th century BCE
- UNESCO World Heritage Site
- Type: Cultural
- Criteria: v
- Designated: 2023
- Parent listing: Djerba: Testimony to a settlement pattern in an island territory
- Reference no.: 1640-017

The El Ghriba Synagogue (Arabic: كنيس الغريبة), also known as the Djerba Synagogue, is an ancient Maghrebi Jewish congregation and synagogue, located in the Jewish village of Hara Seghira (currently known as er-Riadh), several kilometres southwest of Houmt El Souk, the main town on the island of Djerba, Tunisia. The synagogue appears to be the oldest synagogue in Africa.

Besides being the center of the island's Jewish life, the synagogue is also a Jewish site of pilgrimage. While extensively renovated in the 19th century CE, the buildings may date from the 6th century BCE: one of the legends associated with its founding claims that either a stone or a door from Solomon's Temple or the Second Temple is incorporated in the building. El Ghriba is the most famous of the about 20 synagogues that were being used until the 1950s in the three Jewish villages on Djerba.

In 2023 Djerba was declared a UNESCO World Heritage Site.

The synagogue has been the target of terrorist attacks in 1985, in 2002, and in 2023.

== History ==
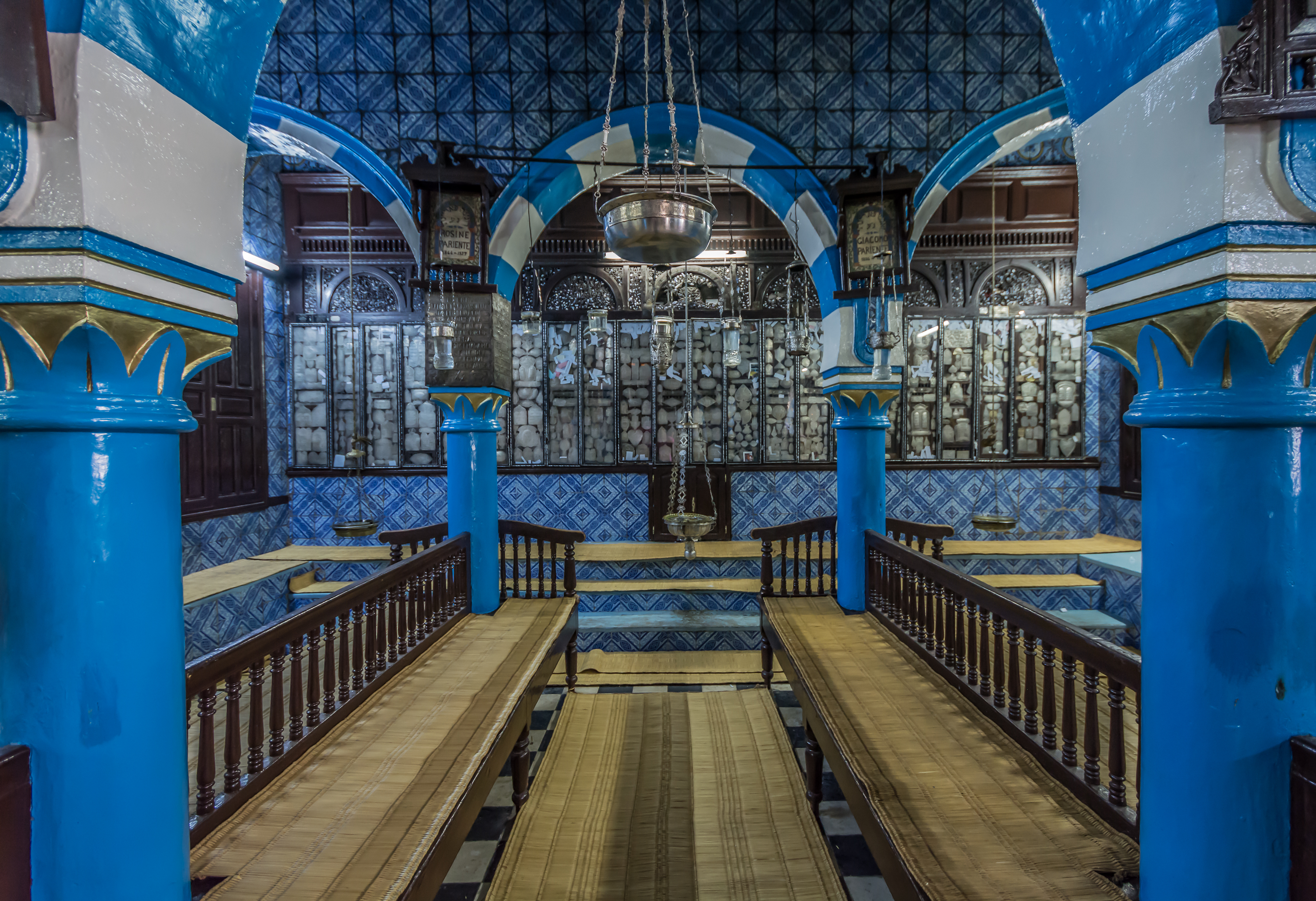
Inside the synagogue

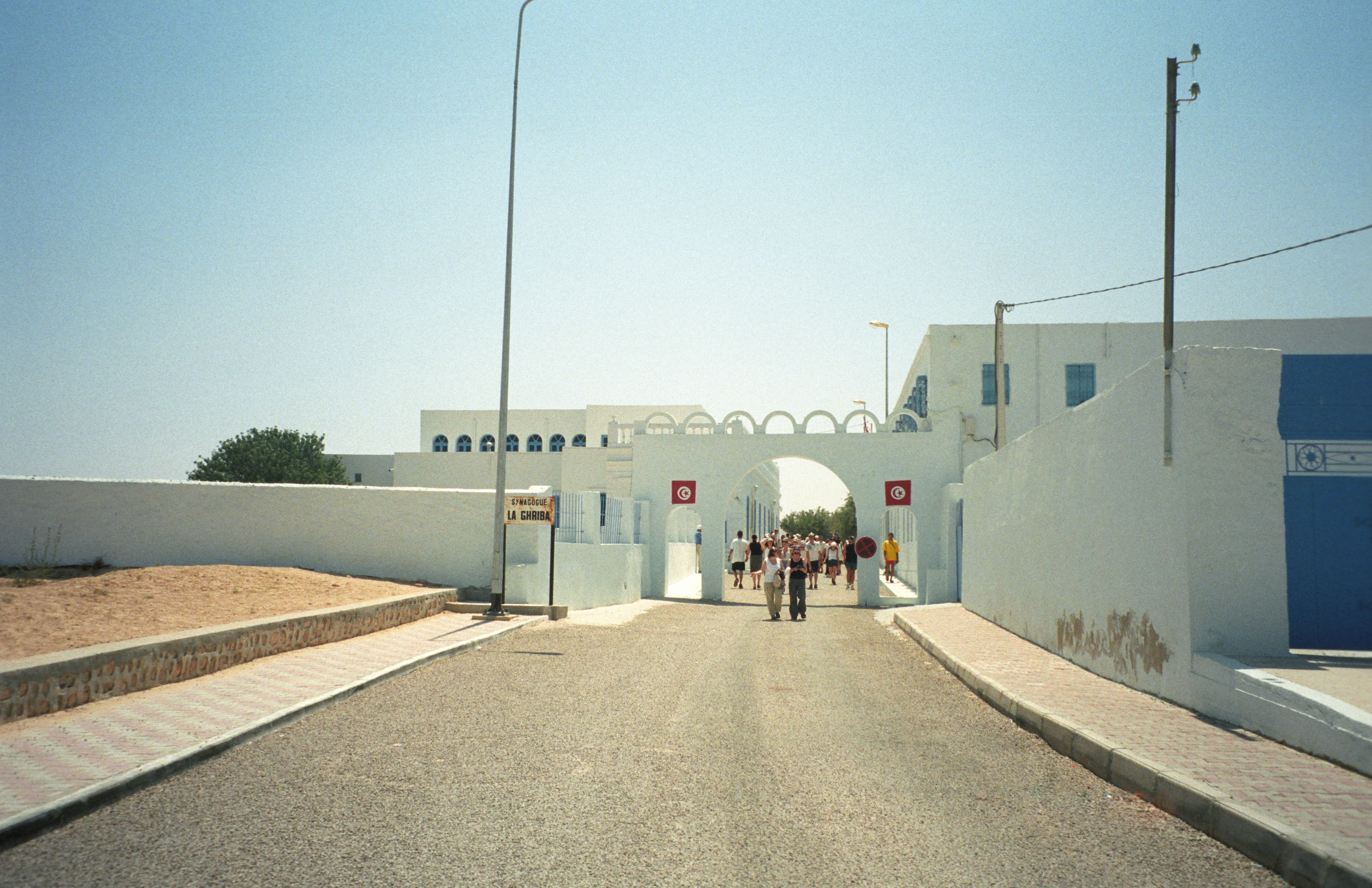
Entrance of the synagogue

Djerba is home to around 1,300 Jews, and El Ghriba is an important feature of Jewish life on the island. According to legend, the construction of the synagogue dates from to the High Priests' escape following the destruction of Solomon's Temple by the Babylonians under Nebuchadnezzar II in the year 586 BCE (or, alternately, the destruction of the Second Temple in 70 CE). The High Priests carried with them a door and a stone of the destroyed Temple. Thus the synagogue links the Jewish diaspora to the "sole sanctuary of Judaism". In modern times, the local Jews are distinguished by their dress, which includes a black band around their pants, which signifies the destruction of the Temple.

Another tradition claims that the synagogue was built on a spot where a young girl (ghriba, "the isolated one") had lived, that had not been accepted by the others. She died, and her uncorrupted body was found by the Jews of the nearby village, and then buried in a cave which became the site of an annual pilgrimage for Lag BaOmer.

== Buildings ==
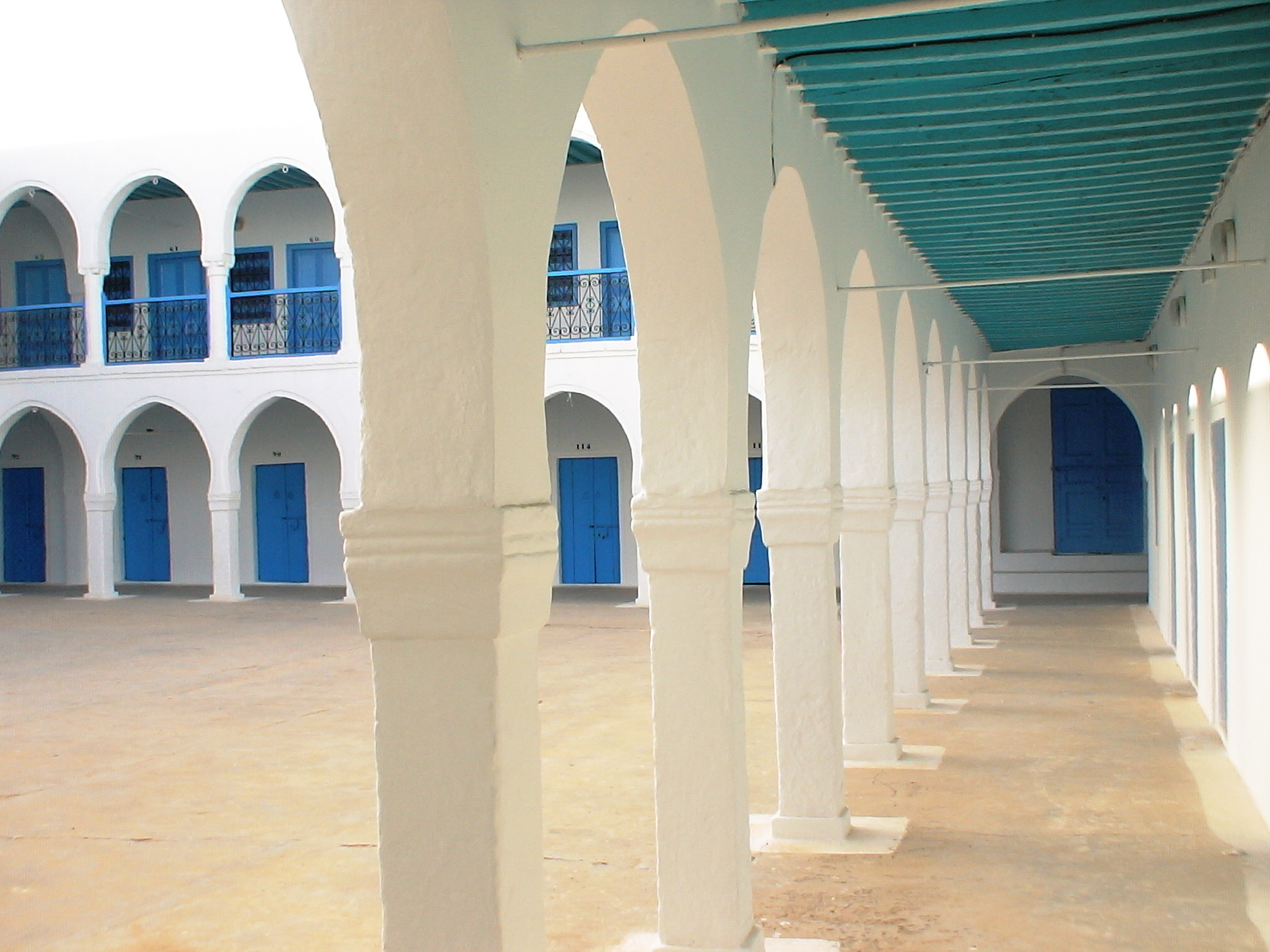
Courtyard of El Ghriba

The synagogue was built at the end of the 19th century at the spot where the sixth-century building had stood.

On the outside, the current synagogue is a modest building, whereas the interior is richly decorated. In contrast to the other synagogues of Djerba, El Ghriba consists of two covered halls. Following several structural extensions the first of the two halls was built through the roofing of a formerly open courtyard in order to increase the capacity for the number of visitors. At the entrance, there are two columns dividing the room into three areas. This hall is connected to the main hall by three vaults. At this side there are two columns, supporting a high skylight of numerous windows. Initially there were twelve windows in the hall, representing the twelve tribes of Israel.

During later renovations further windows were added. The north side also was modified. The Teva (the cupboard for the Torah) is located under the skylight (at the western side of the prayer room). A third column to the east is missing. It probably never got constructed. Local tradition sees that as a reminder of the destruction of the temple of Jerusalem. Furthermore, it is said that the building should remain unfinished, because "nothing, except for the divinity, is perfect". The wooden benches for the believers are situated around the Teva. The inner walls are decorated with ceramic tiles resembling qallalin tiles, painted in green, yellow, blue brown and white decorative patterns painted by hand. A recess underneath the holy arc marks the spot where the body of the girl is supposed to have been found: It is known as «the cave of the girl».

The inner courtyard is surrounded by covered loggias standing on columns. Pilgrims can use the adjacent buildings for accommodation. The oldest of them were built at the end of the nineteenth century, whereas the newer ones stem from the early 1950s.

== Pilgrimage ==
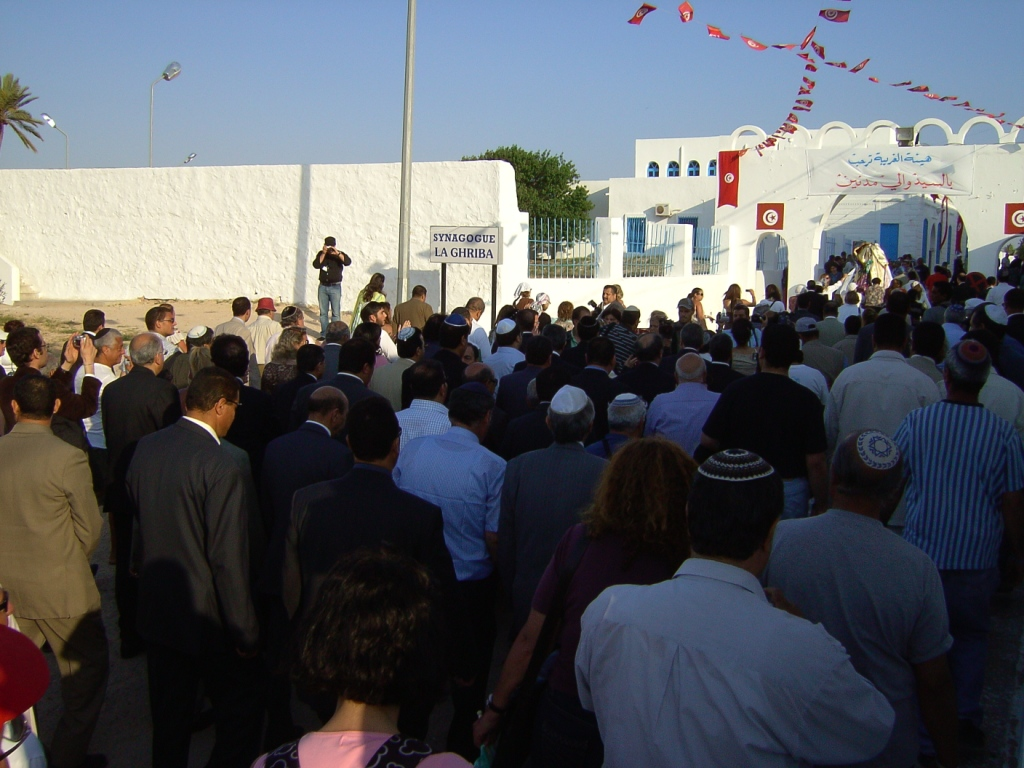
Lag Ba'Omer procession returning to the El Ghriba synagogue, 2007

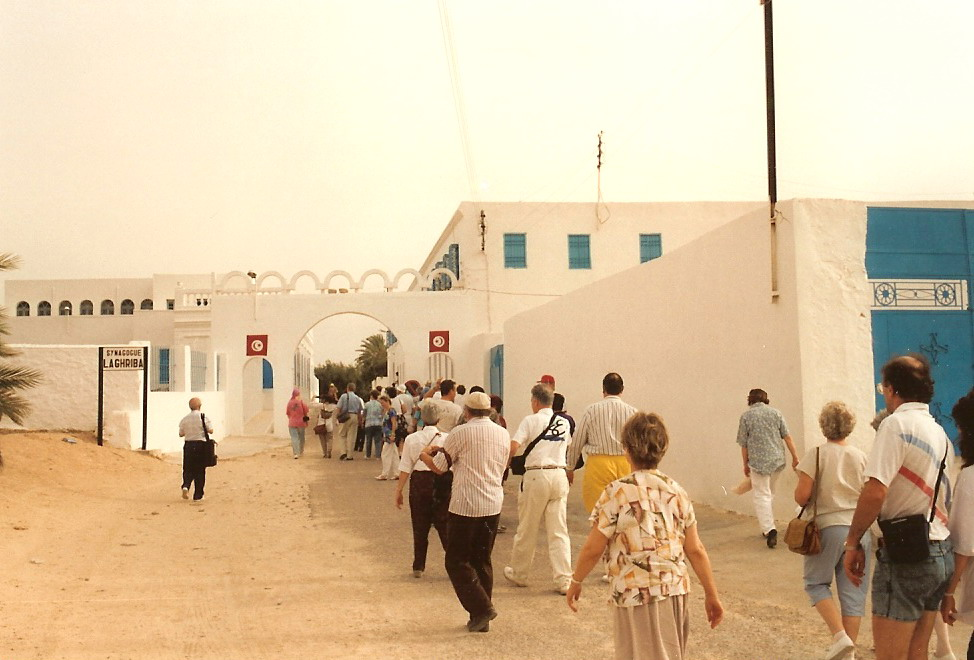
People visiting El Ghriba

The pilgrimage takes place every year on the 33rd day of the Counting of the Omer, in between Pesach and Shavuot. On the 14th of Iyar, the festivities begin, in remembrance of the tannaitic rabbi Meir Baal HaNess, and last until the Lag BaOmer on the 18th of Iyar, in remembrance of Tannaitic Rabbi Simeon bar Yochai (regionally known as Rabbi Shimon).

== Target of terrorist attacks ==
In 1985, three people were killed, including one child, and fifteen people were wounded during the festival of Simchat Torah when a local policeman responsible for guarding the synagogue fired into a crowd of celebrating Jews. The attack was in response to Operation Wooden Leg (Hebrew: מבצע רגל עץ, romanized: Mivtza Regel Etz), when Israel targeted the PLO headquarters in Tunisia. The local policeman, whose relative was killed in the operation, targeted the synagogue in a wave of anti-Jewish sentiment following the operation.

On April 11, 2002, a truck full of explosives was detonated close to the synagogue, killing 21 people, among whom were 14 German tourists, five Tunisians, and two French nationals. Al-Qaeda militants claimed responsibility for the bombing, which was found to have been masterminded by Khalid Sheikh Mohammed and financed by a Pakistani resident of Spain.

On 9 May 2023, a member of the Tunisian National Guard violently attacked Jewish worshippers outside the synagogue, shooting and killing two Jewish cousins (a French tourist and a Tunisian citizen living in Netivot, Israel), and two Tunisian security guards. Eight others were injured. The shooter, a guard at a naval center, initially shot and killed a colleague and seized his ammunition before heading to the synagogue. He was shot dead by security guards during a gunfight.

== Administration ==
The synagogue is being supervised by an independent administration committee that was established at the end of the nineteenth century, when Djerba was a French protectorate. The administration committee organizes the annual pilgrimage and distributes the pilgrimage's revenues to the village elders.

== Gallery ==
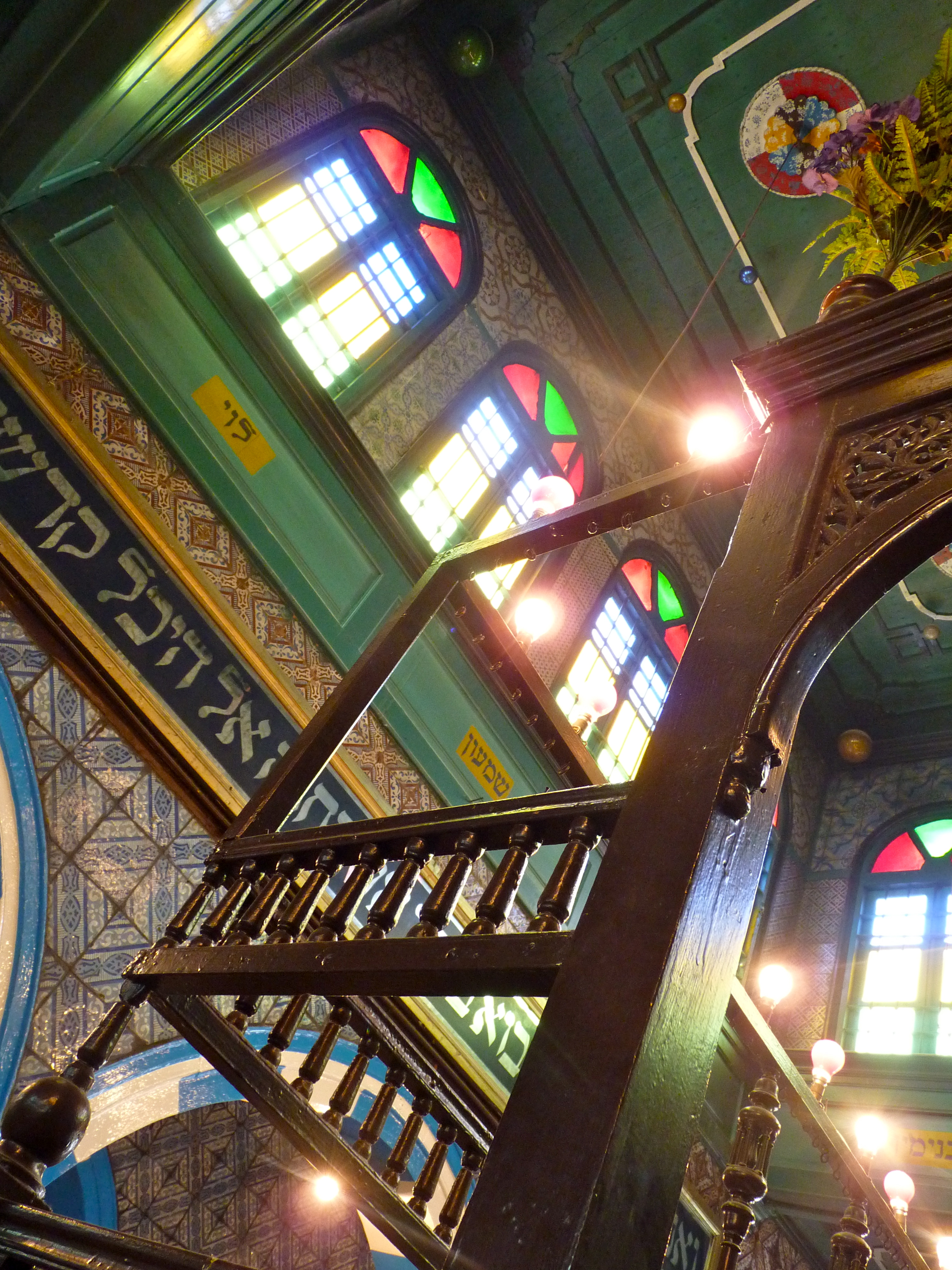

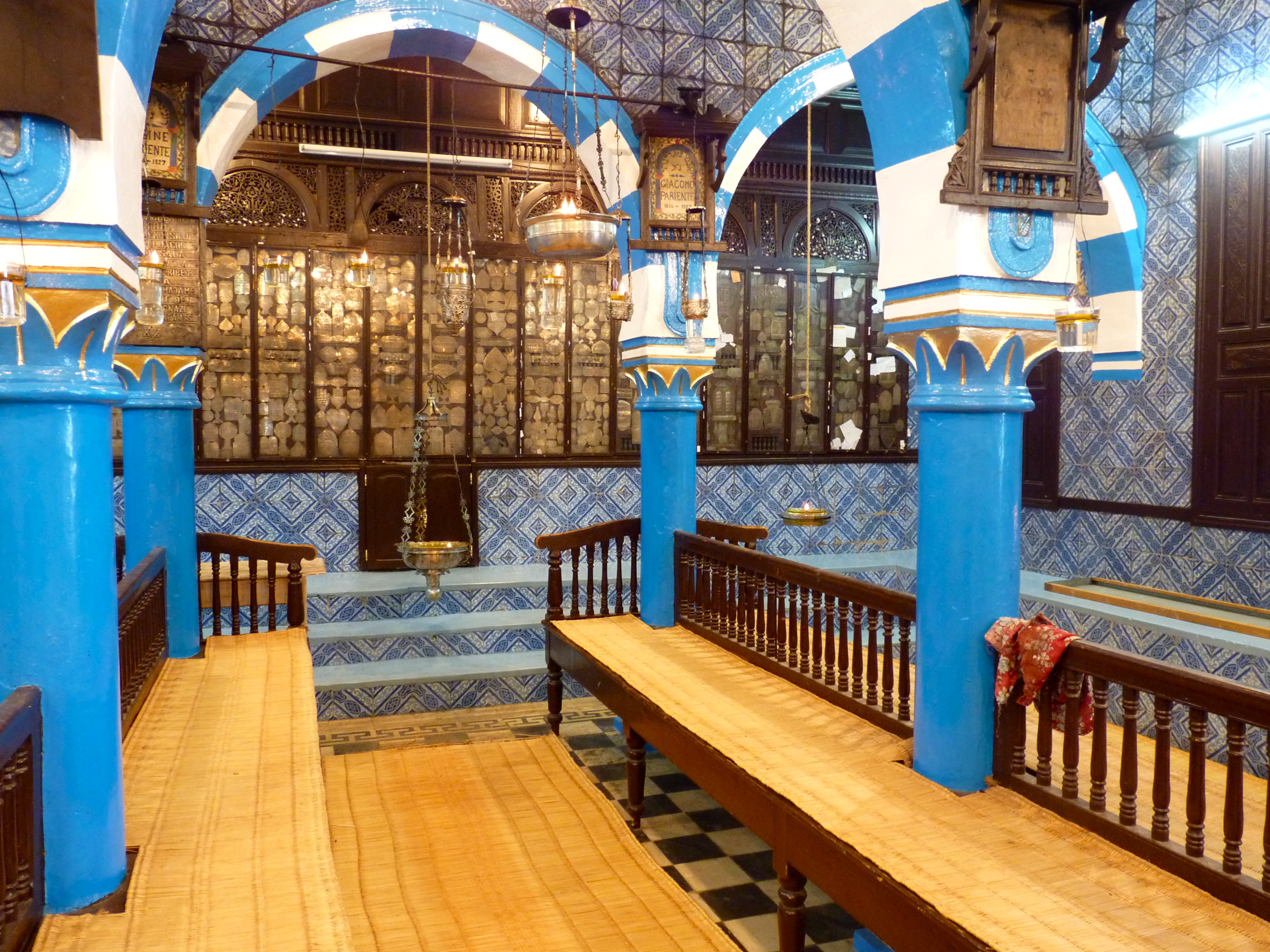

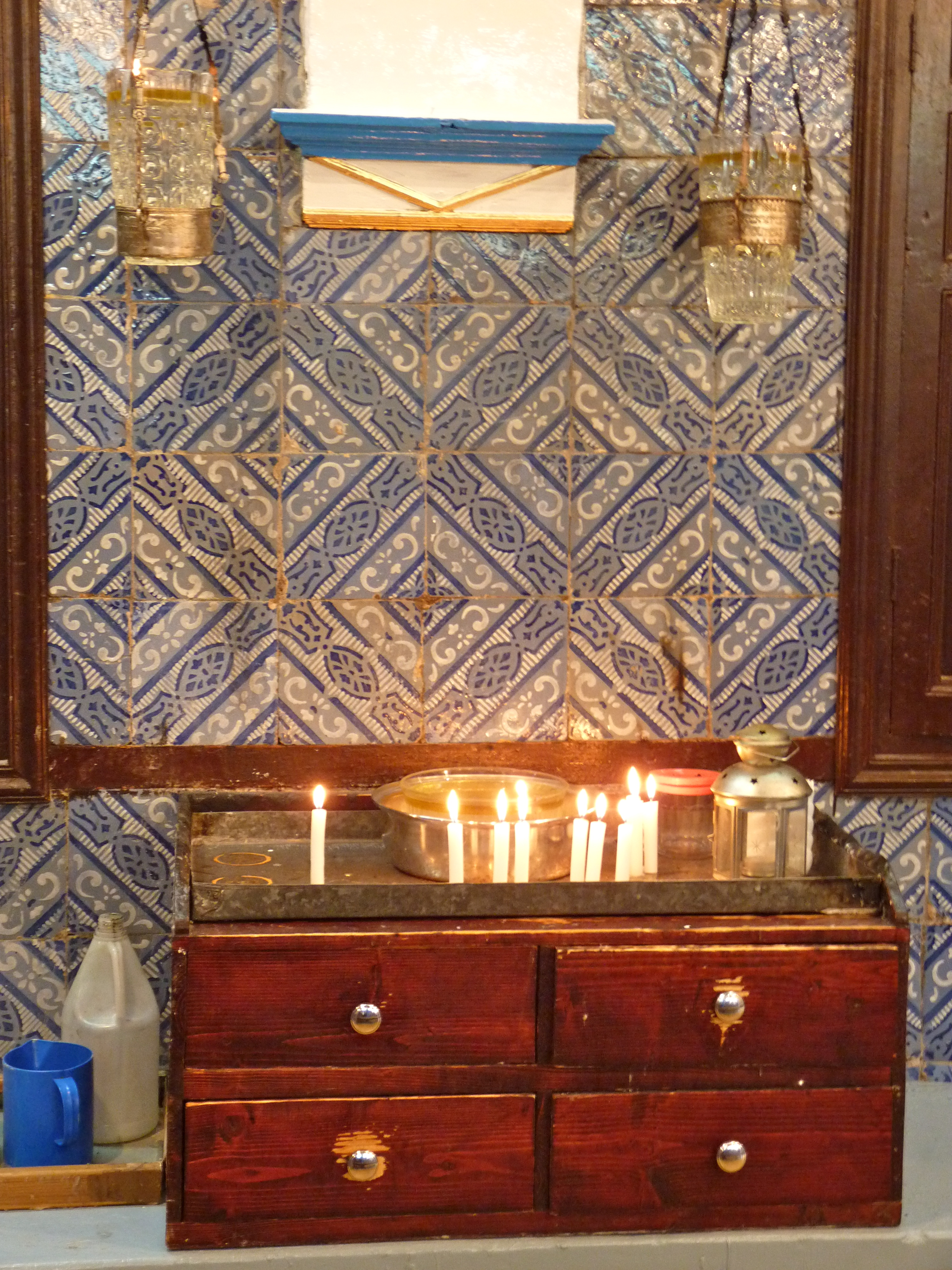

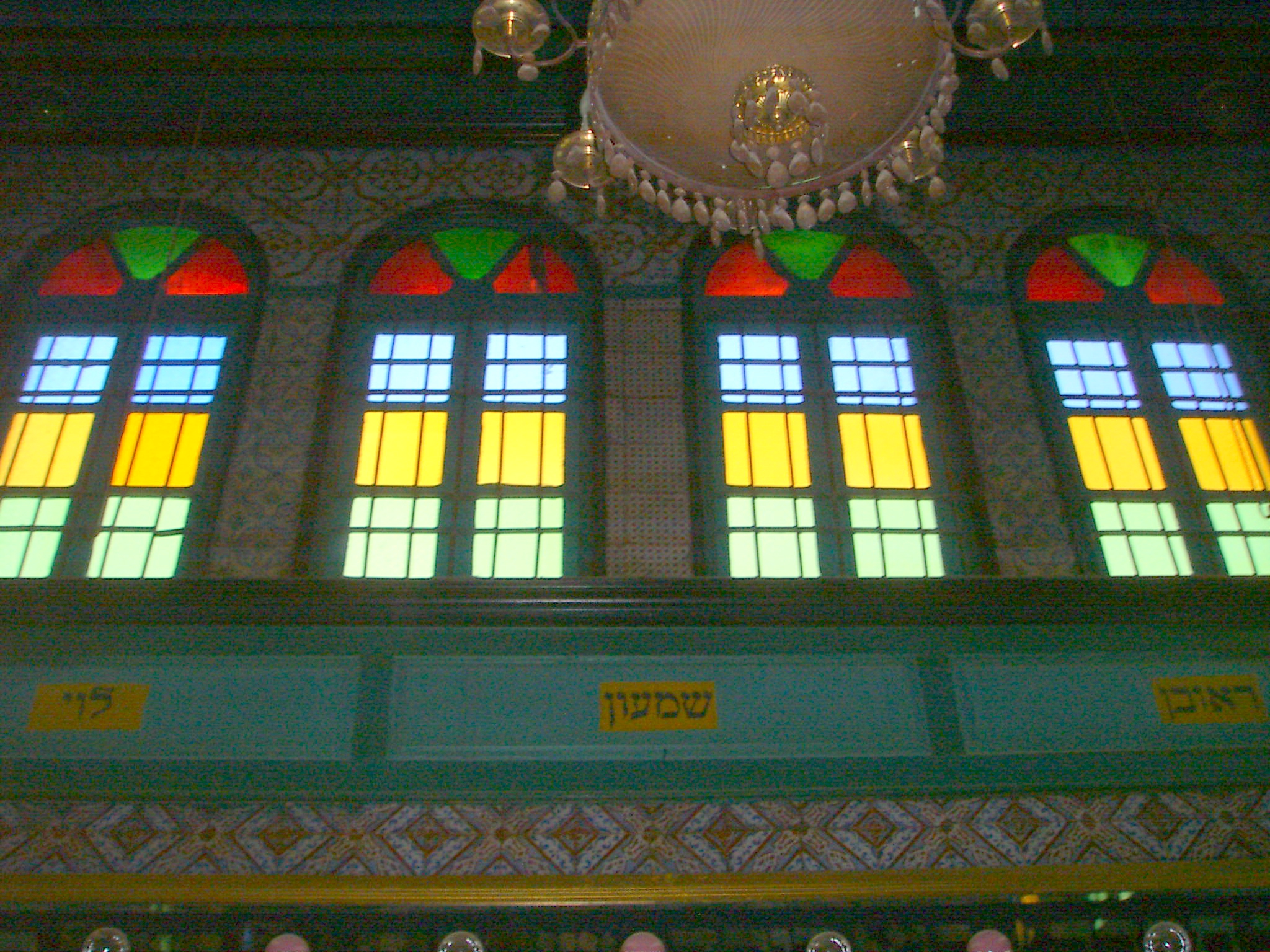

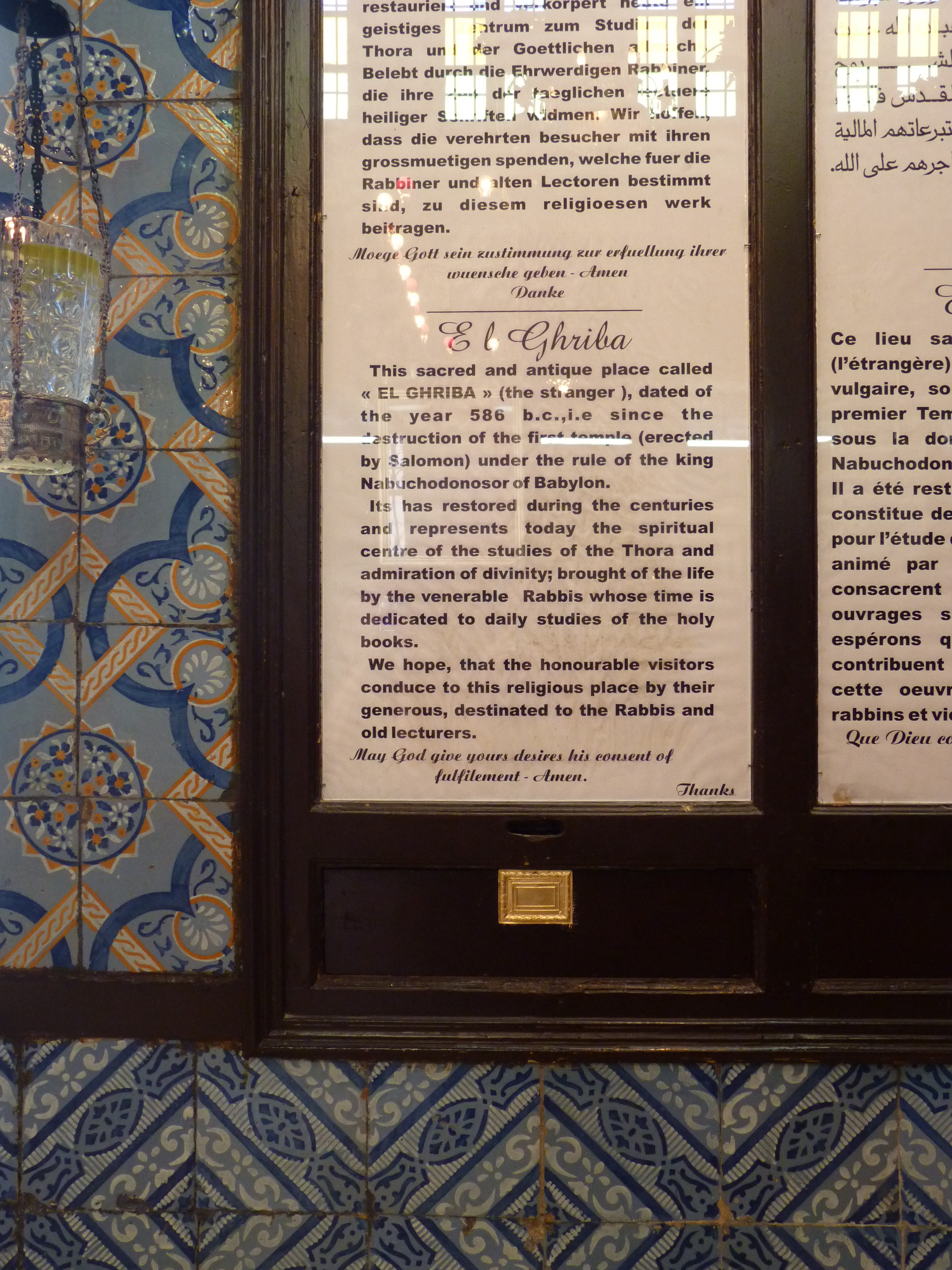

== See also ==
- Chaim Madar
- History of the Jews in Djerba
- La Ghriba, a documentary film
- List of synagogues in Tunisia
- Three Pilgrimage Festivals
- Oldest synagogues in the world
