= Tunisian National Guard =

National Guard Garde Nationale الحرس الوطني el-Ḥaras el-Waṭanī
- Official TNG insignia
- Abbreviation: GN
- Motto: فداء للوطن; Redemption for the homeland

Agency overview
- Formed: September 6, 1956

Jurisdictional structure
- Operations jurisdiction: Tunisia
- Constituting instrument: Beylical Decree of 6 September 1956, establishment of the National Guard
- General nature: Gendarmerie; Civilian police
- Specialist jurisdiction: National border patrol, security, integrity

Operational structure
- Elected officer responsible: Taoufik Charfeddine, Minister of the Interior
- Parent agency: Ministry of the Interior

The Tunisian National Guard (French: Garde Nationale, Tunisian Arabic: الحرس الوطني, romanized: el-Ḥaras el-Waṭanī) is the national gendarmerie force of the Republic of Tunisia and separated from the Tunisian Armed Forces.

== History ==
During the French protectorate of Tunisia, the French national gendarmerie was tasked to maintain law and order in Tunisia. Shortly after Tunisia's independence, the Tunisian National Guard was created in 1956 by Beylical Decree of 6 September 1956 to replace the French national gendarmerie, which returned to France.

== Missions ==
Tunisian National Guard, along with Tunisian National Police, is the first line of defense against internal security threat. Tunisian National Guard role as stipulated in article 2 of Decree No. 2006-1162 on the special status of agents of the National Guard, are as follows:

- for maintaining public order,
- preserving the security,
- land and sea borders guards,
- road/highway traffic and safety, public safety,
- search for criminals and,
- judicial investigations.

== Organization ==
The Tunisian National Guard is led by a Director General, and consist of an inspectorate general and five directorate general, which are:

- Inspectorate General.
- Directorate General of Public Security.
- Directorate General of Intervention Units.
- Directorate General of Border Guards.
- Directorate General of Common Services.
- Directorate General of the Mutual of Civil Protection National Guard officials.

Aside of five directorate general, It also have Directorate which works directly under Director General of the National Guard:

- Directorate of Research and Investigation.
- Directorate of Anti-Terrorism.
- Directorate of Studies, Strategic plan and International Cooperation.
- The Special Unit.
- The Central Secretariat.
- The Central Operations Room

== Naval Vessels and Aircraft ==
27 Naval Vessels

- 6 patrol boats P350TN (140 t, 35 m), donated by Italy (2 delivered 12.2012; 3 delivered between 2013/2014; 1 will be delivery within 2.2015)
- 7 patrol boats Classe 800/P58 (30 t, 17 m), donated by Italy middle years '00
- 4 patrol boats Classe 700 (18 t, 15 m), donated by Italy in May 2011
- 8 patrol boats Classe Squalo (13 t, 13,5 m), donated by Italy middle years '00
- 2 motorboats Classe 500 (8,5 t, 11 m), donated by Italy in 2009/2011

3 Aircraft

- 3 Bell 429 helicopters

== Ranks ==
Officer ranks

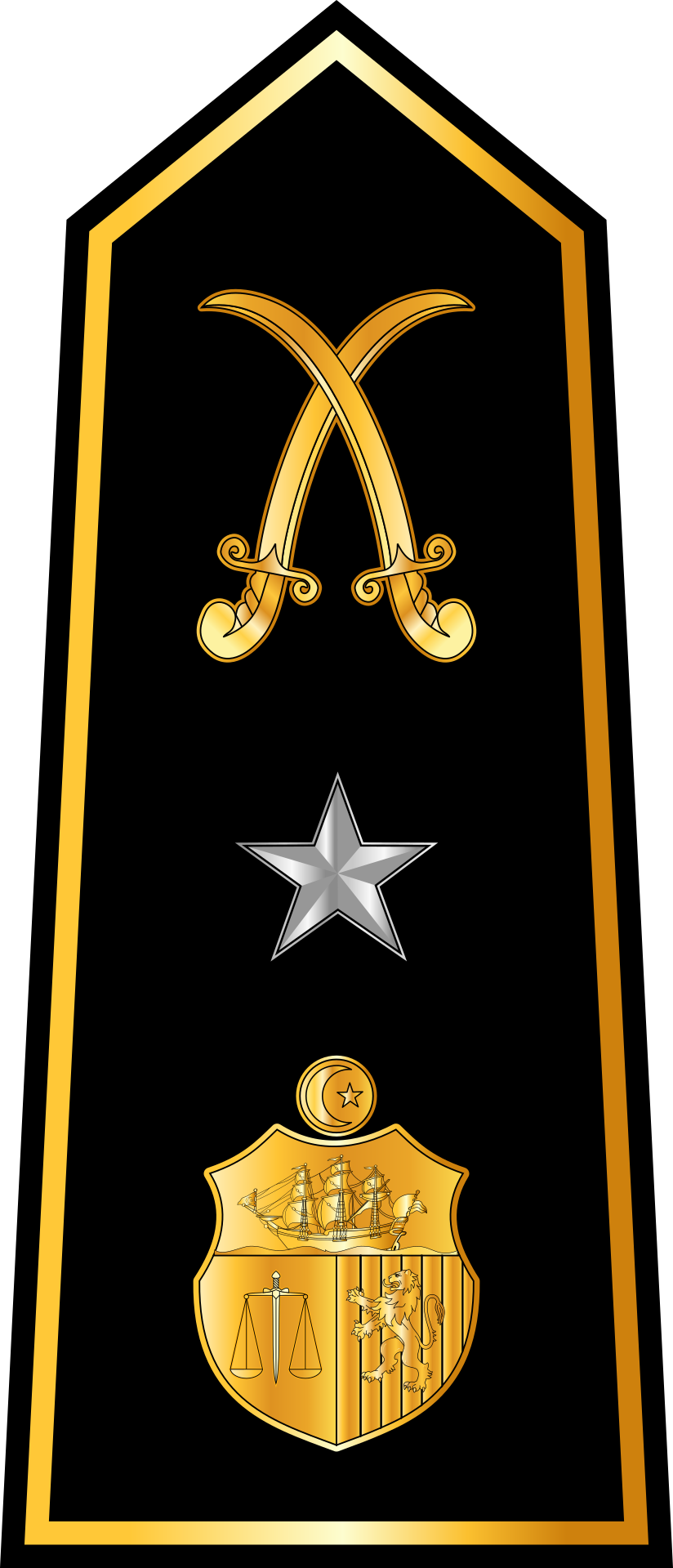
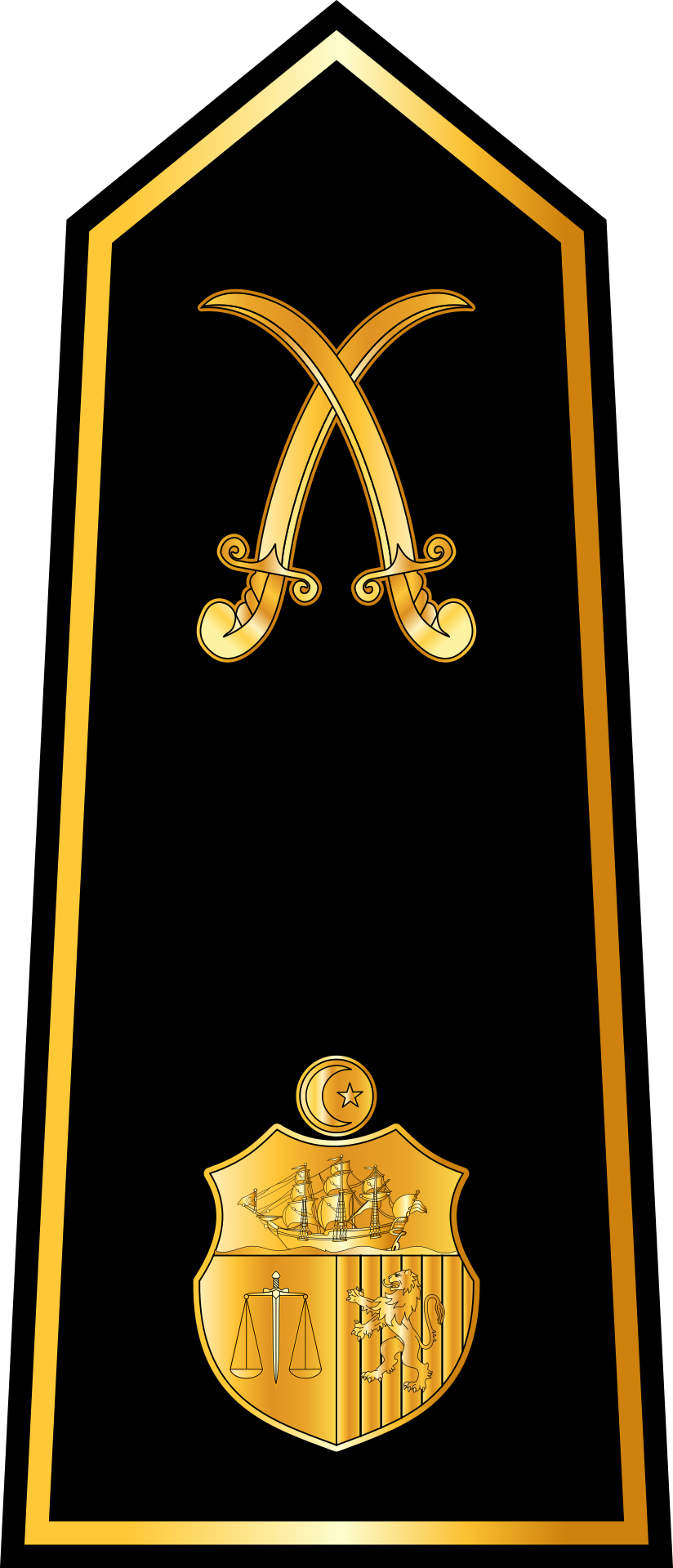
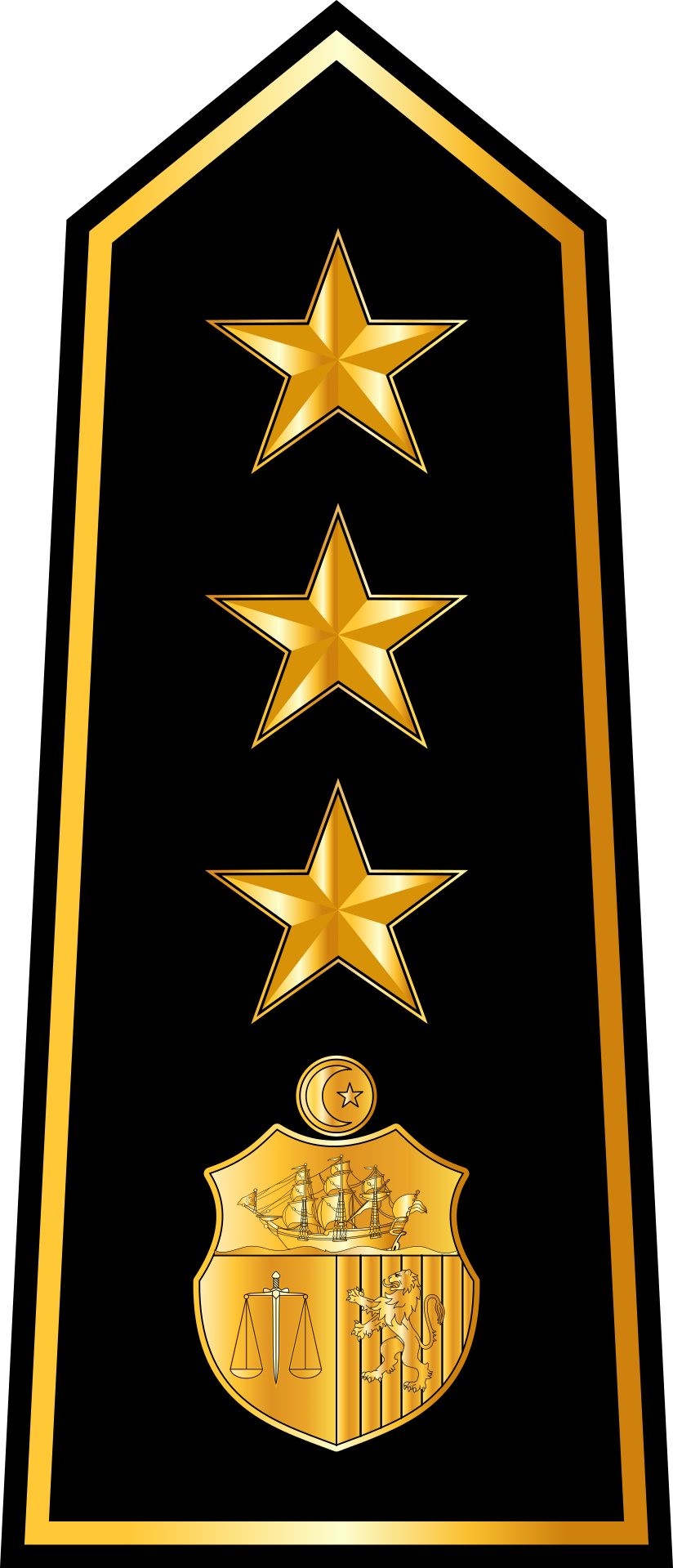
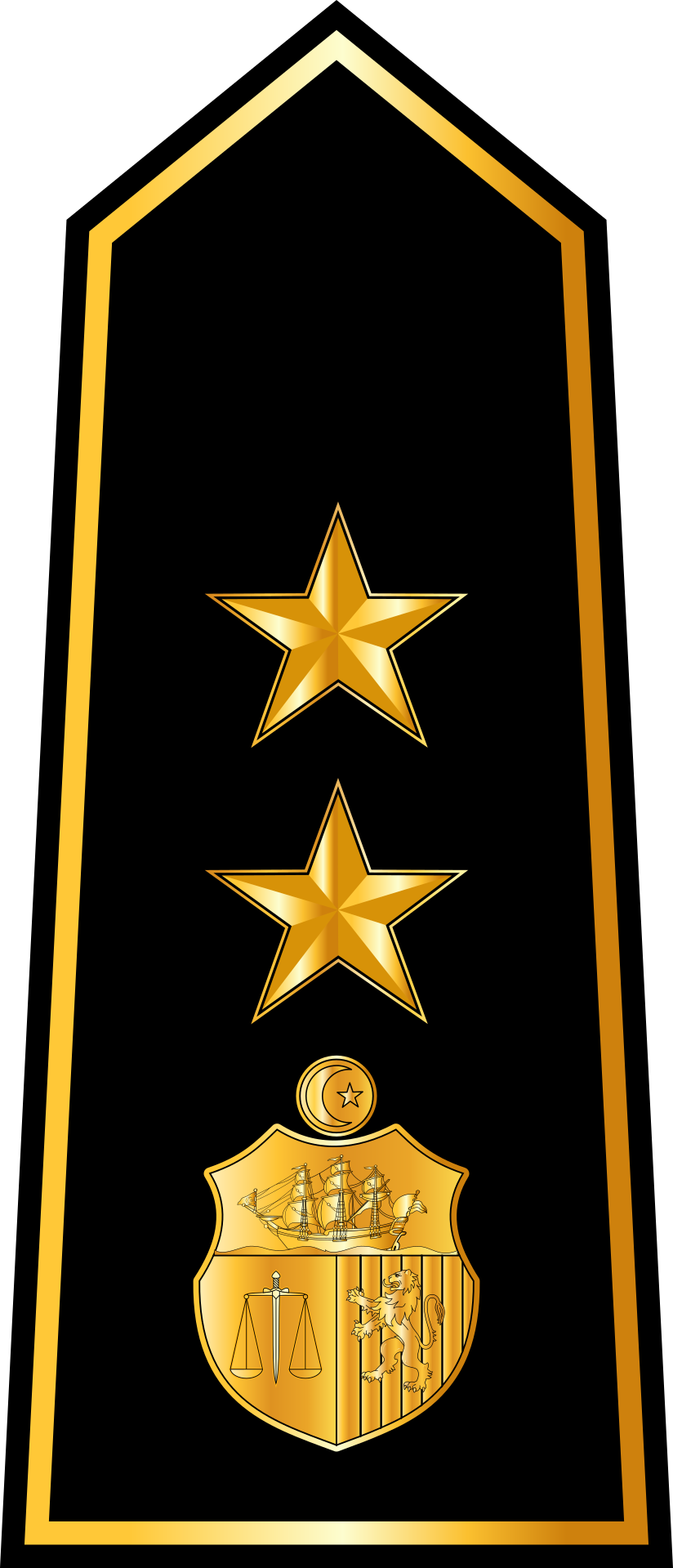
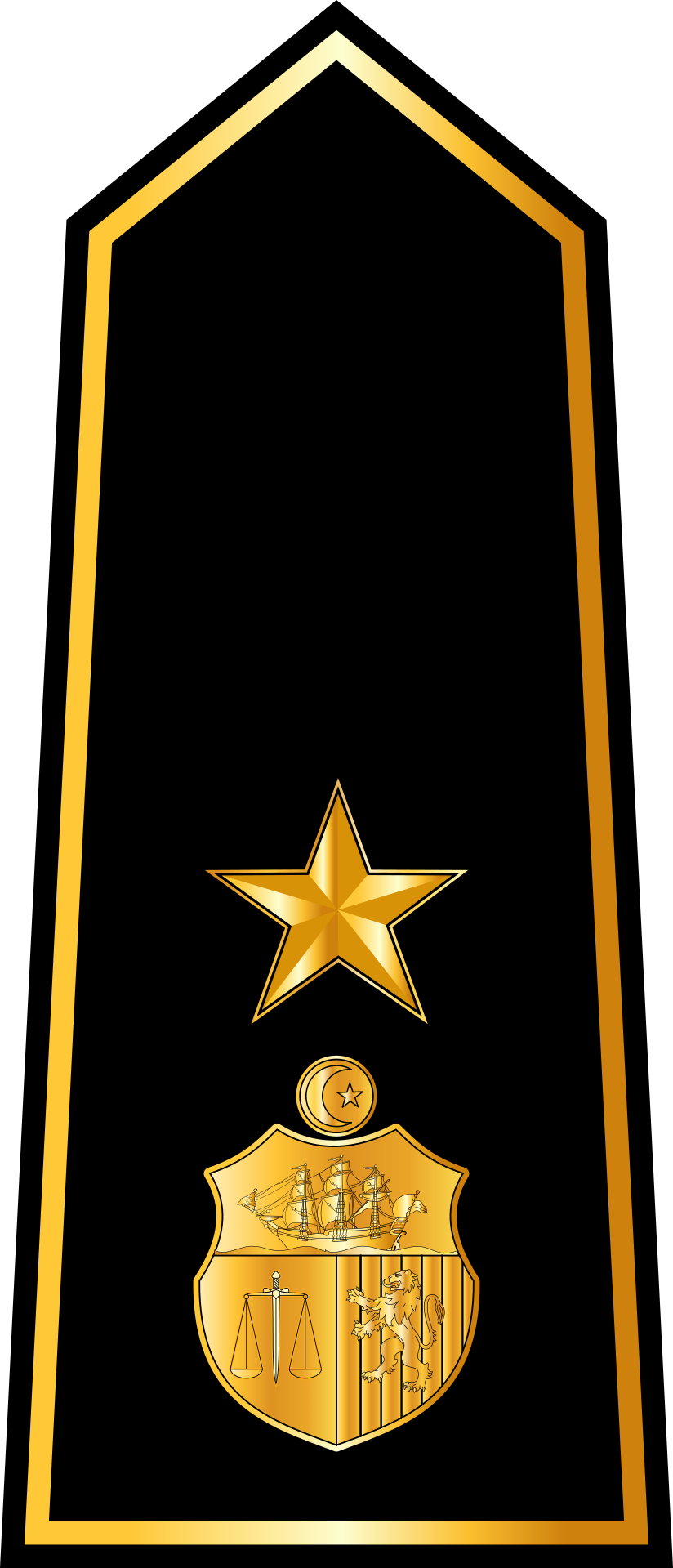
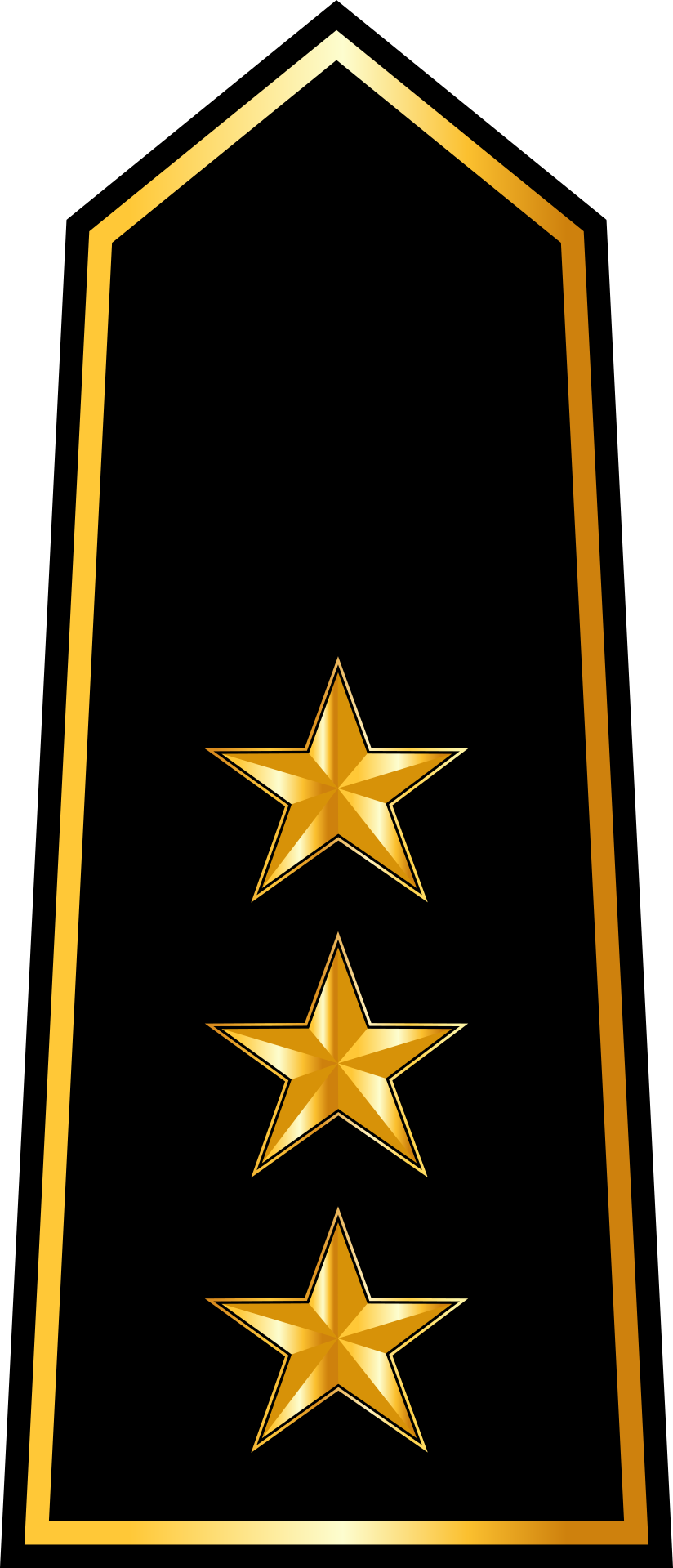
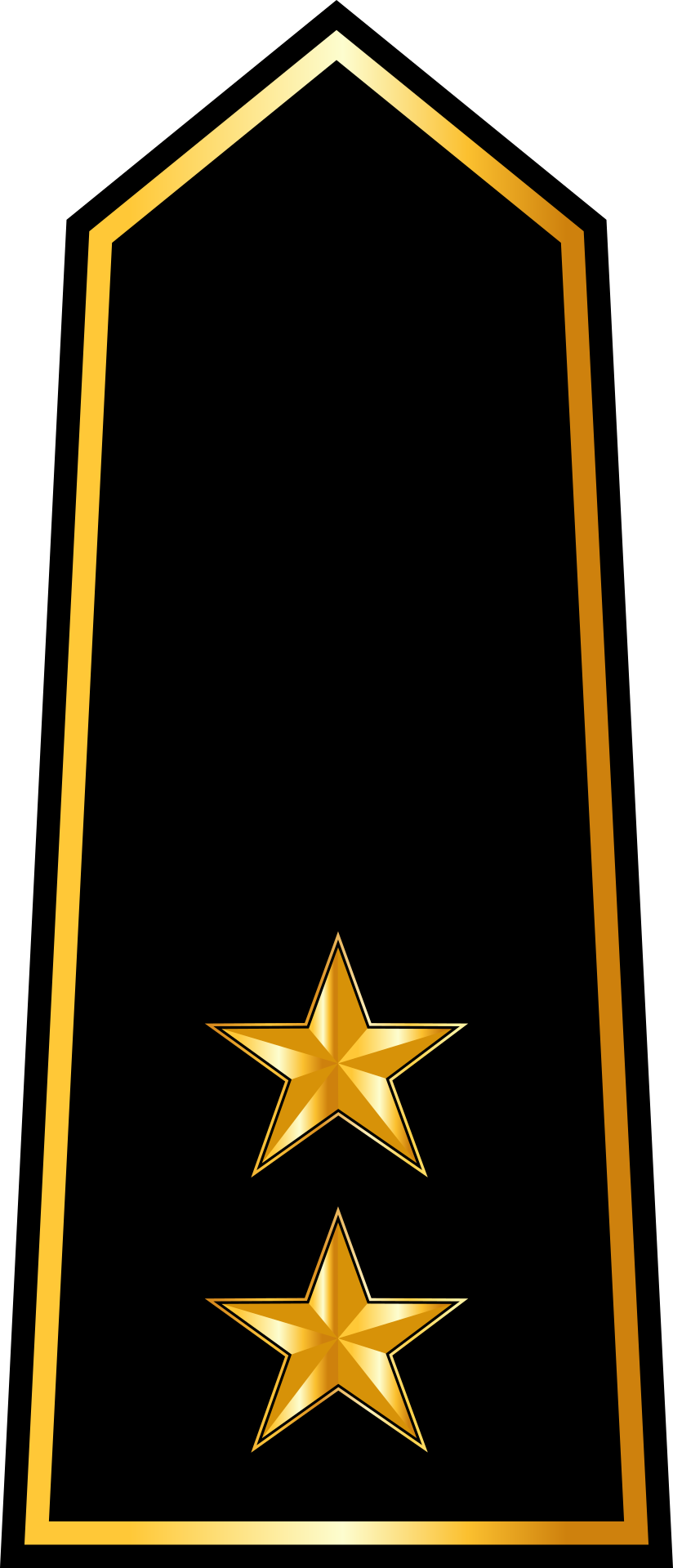
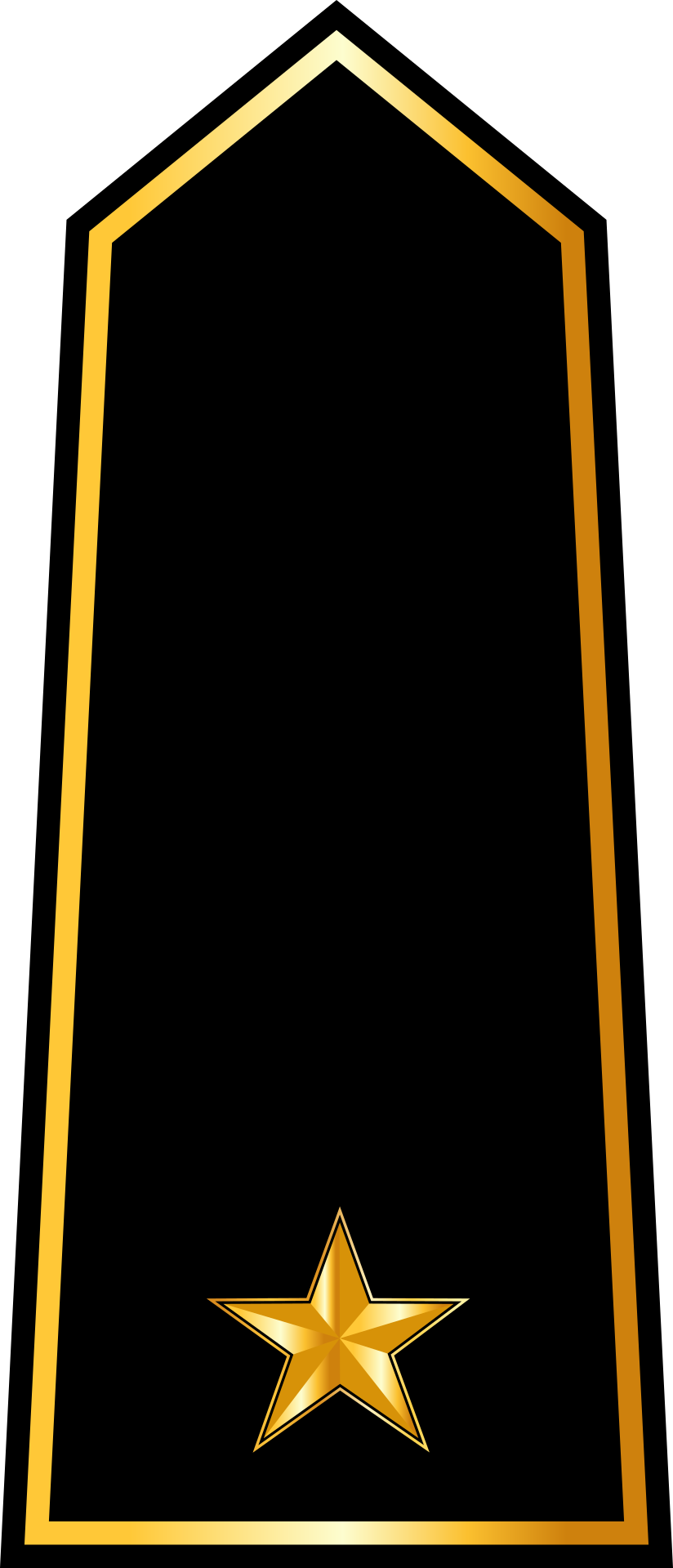
Rank group	General / flag officers	Senior officers				Junior officers
Tunisian National Guard
Tunisian National Guard	أمير لواء 'amir liwa'	عميد; Amid	عقيد; Aqid	مقدم; Muqaddam	رائد; Ra'id	نقيب; Naqib	ملازم أول; Mulazim awwal	ملازم; Mulazim
Tunisian National Guard	Général de brigade	Colonel-major	Colonel	Lieutenant-colonel	Commandant	Capitaine	Lieutenant	Sous-lieutenant

Other ranks

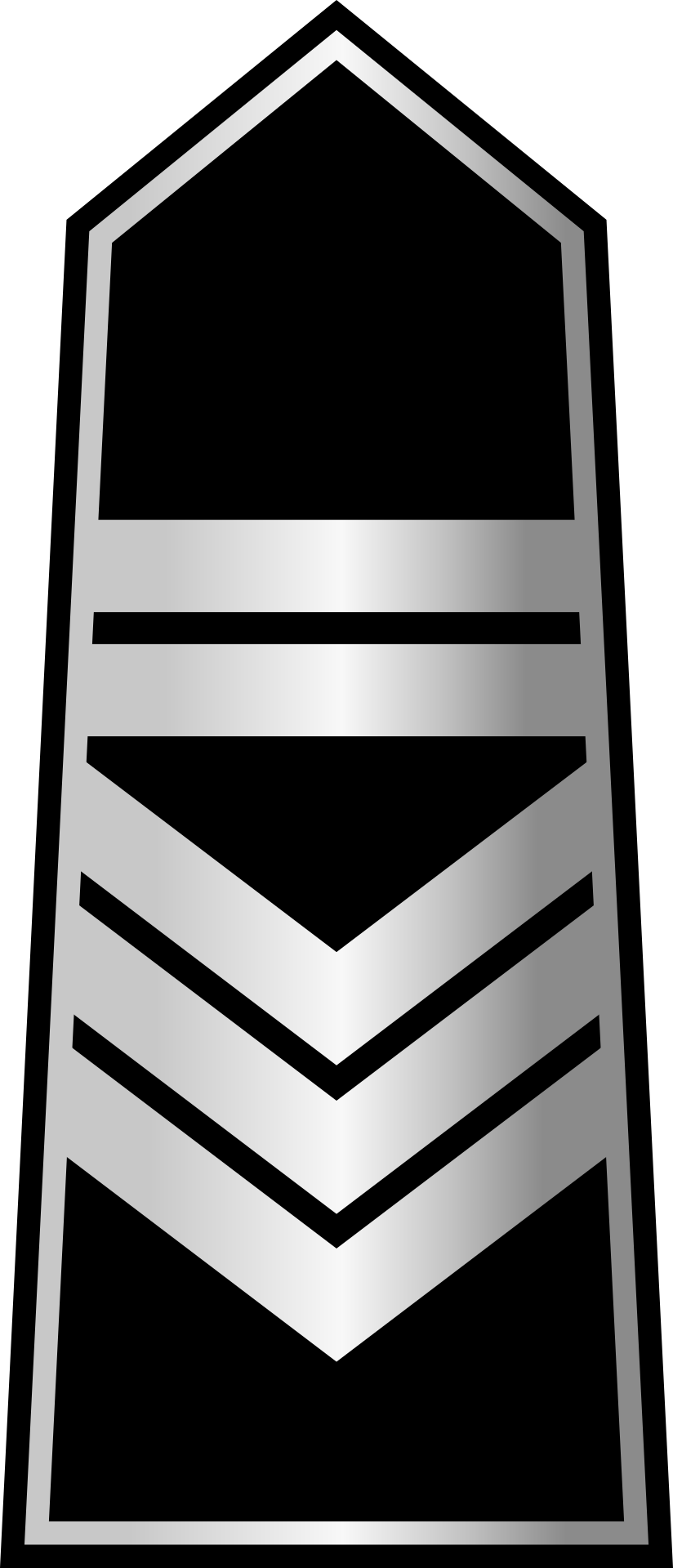
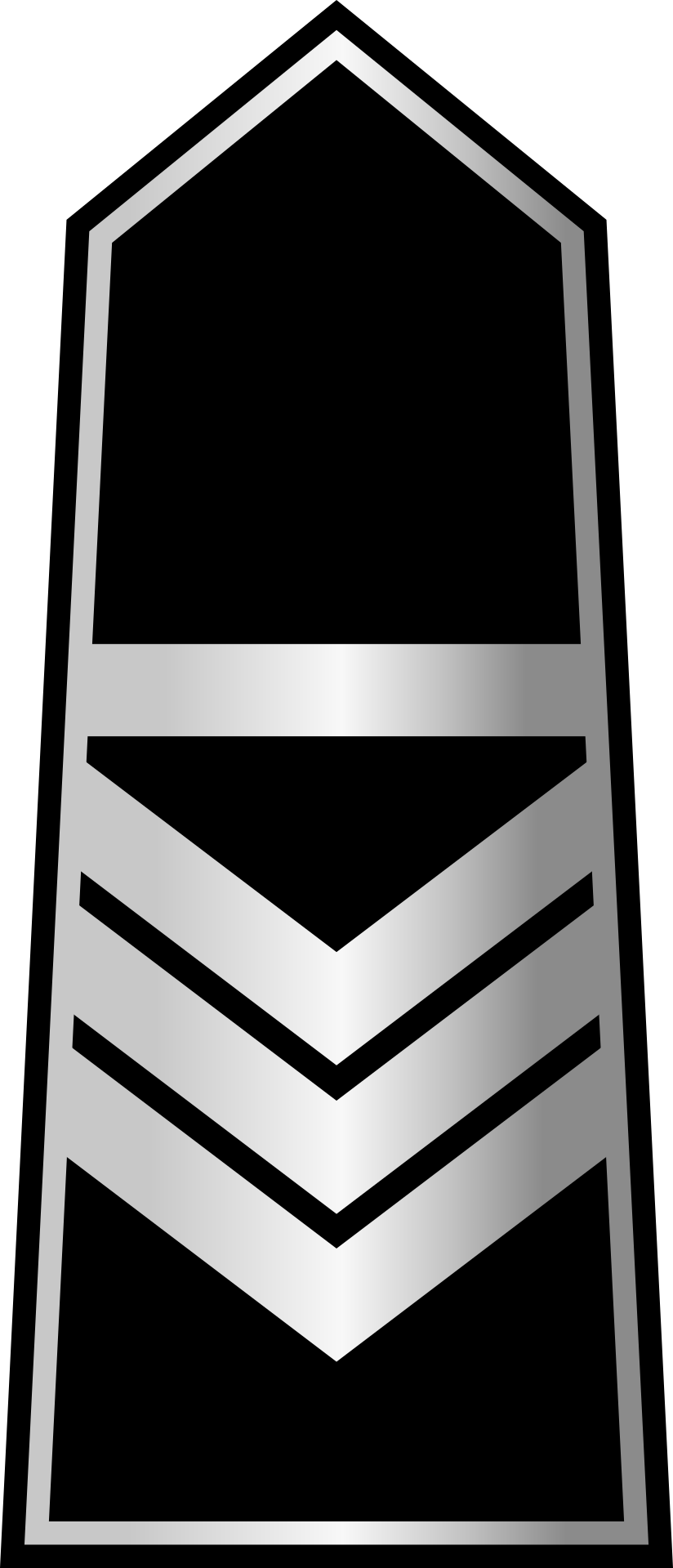
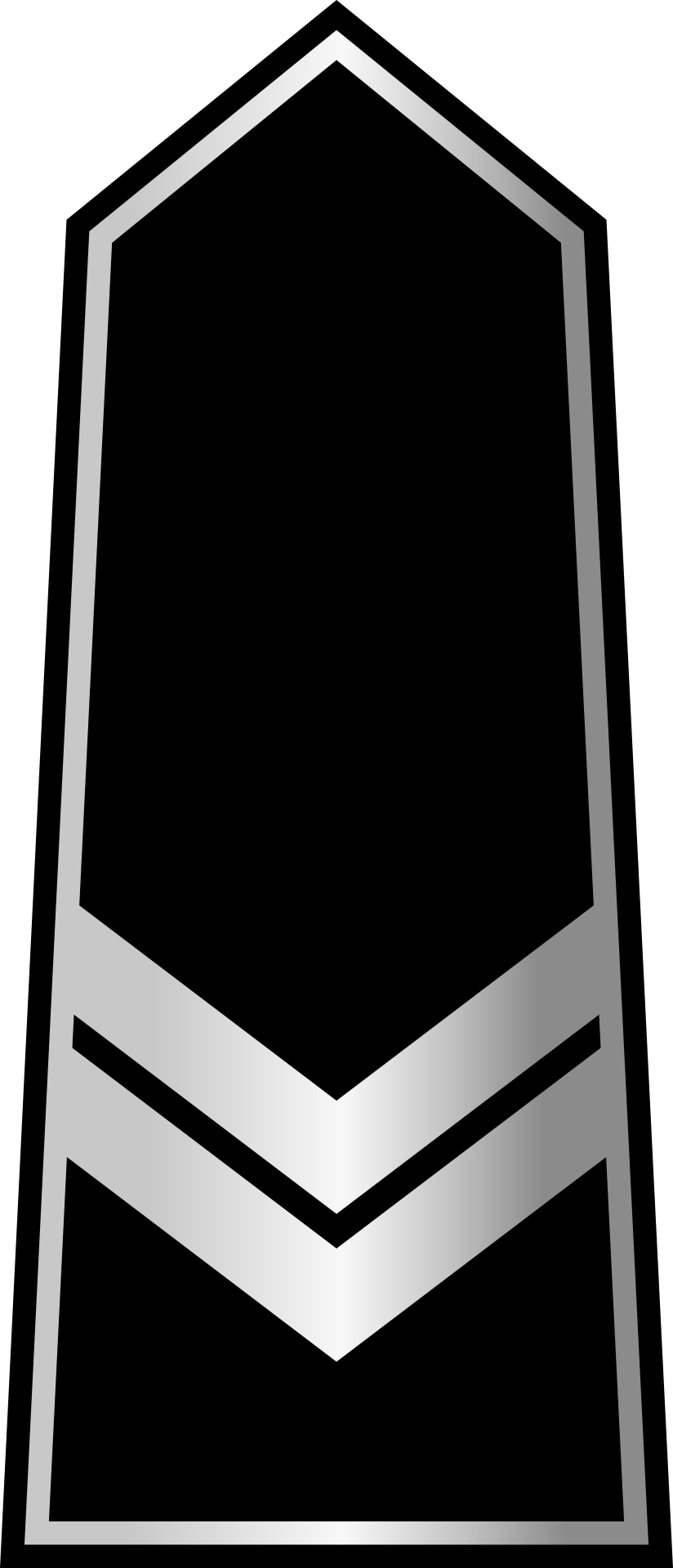
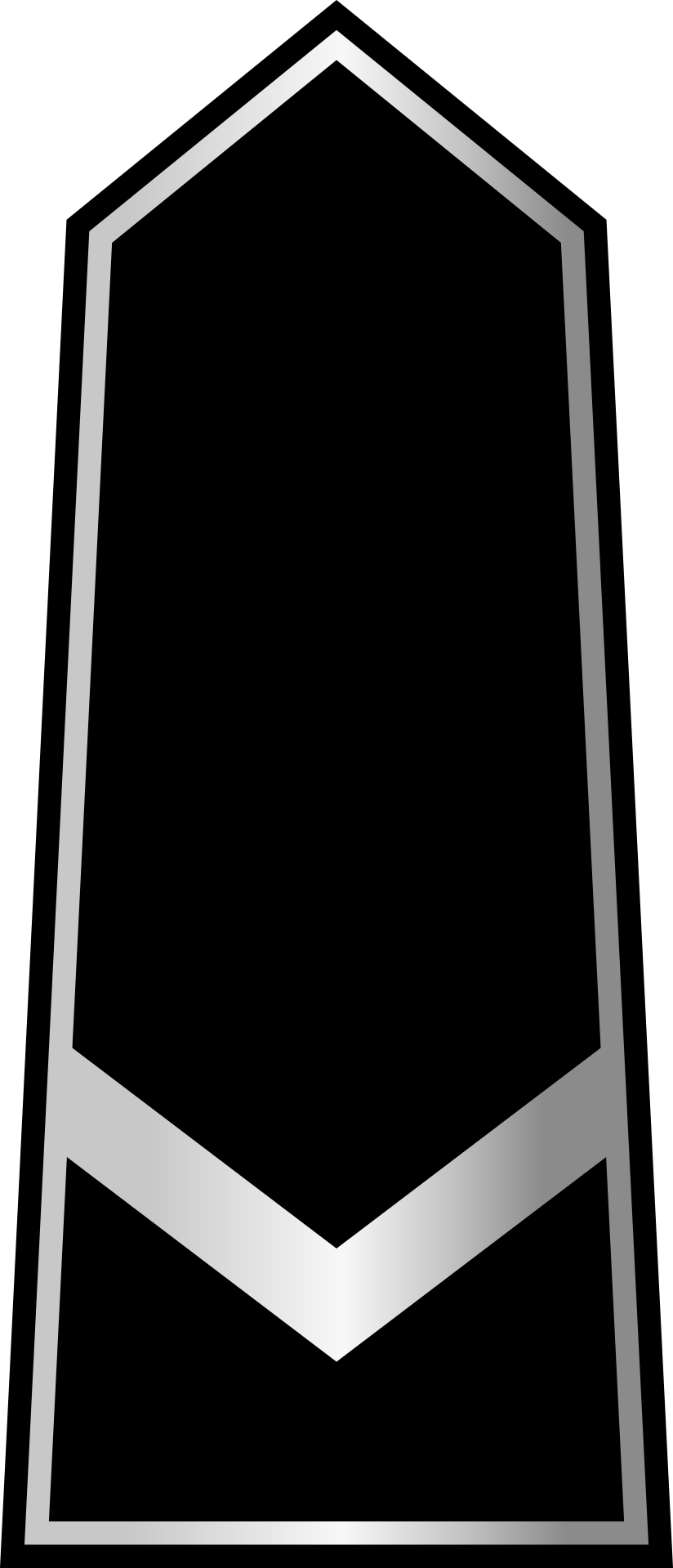
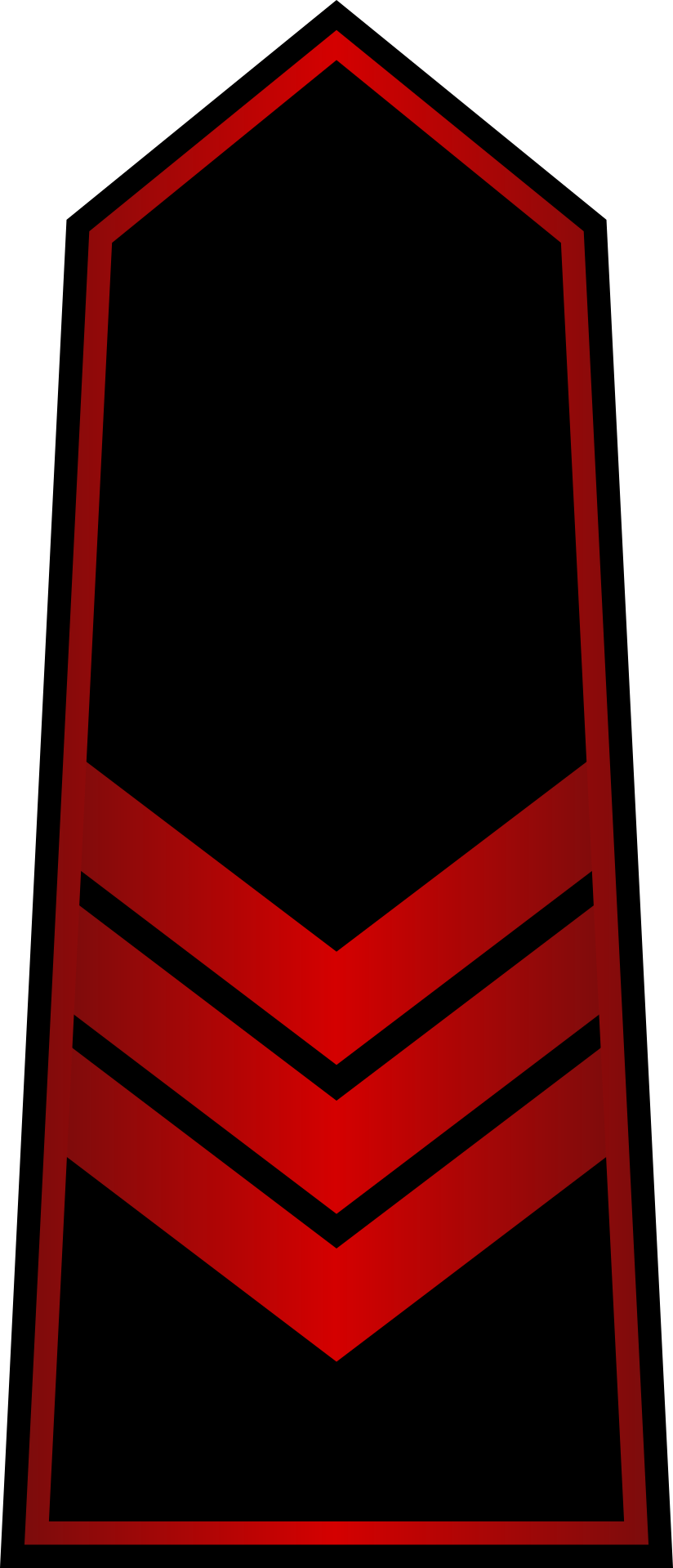
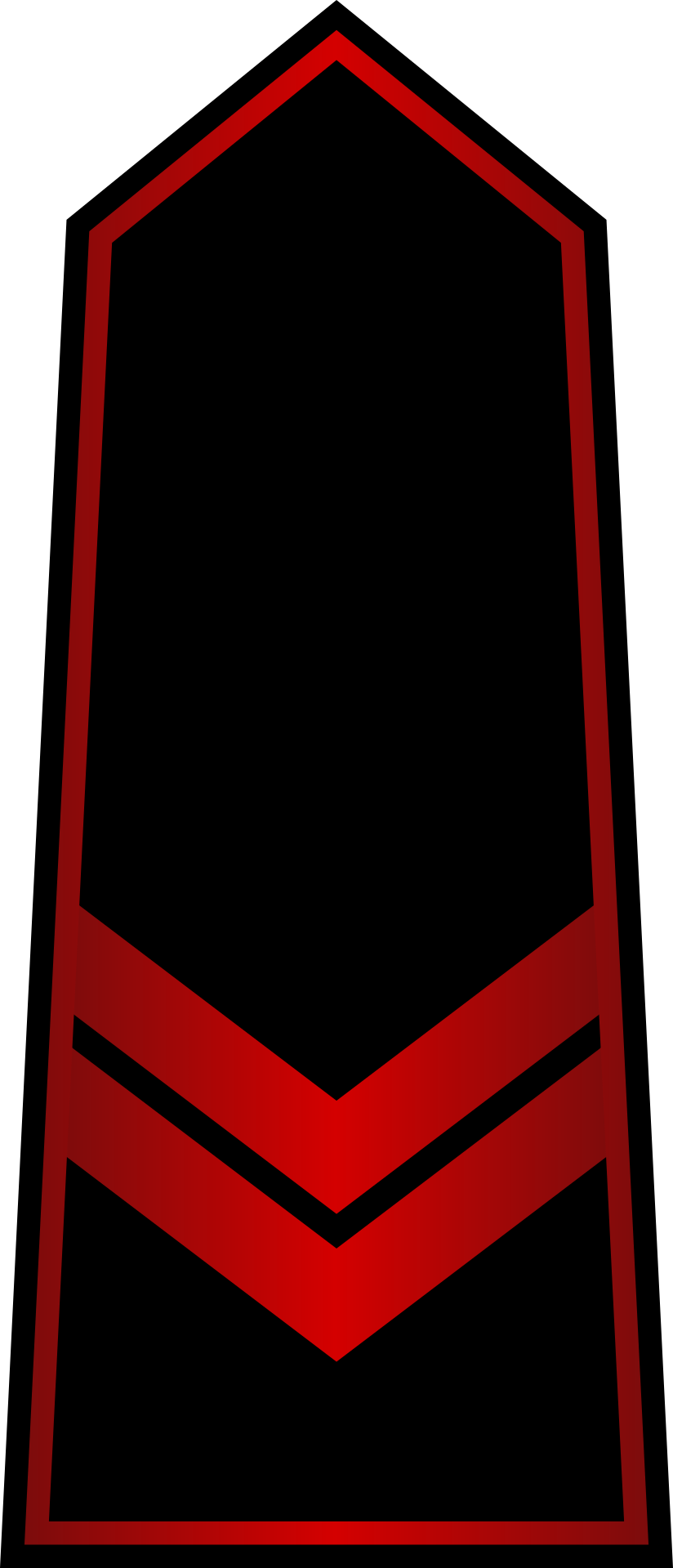
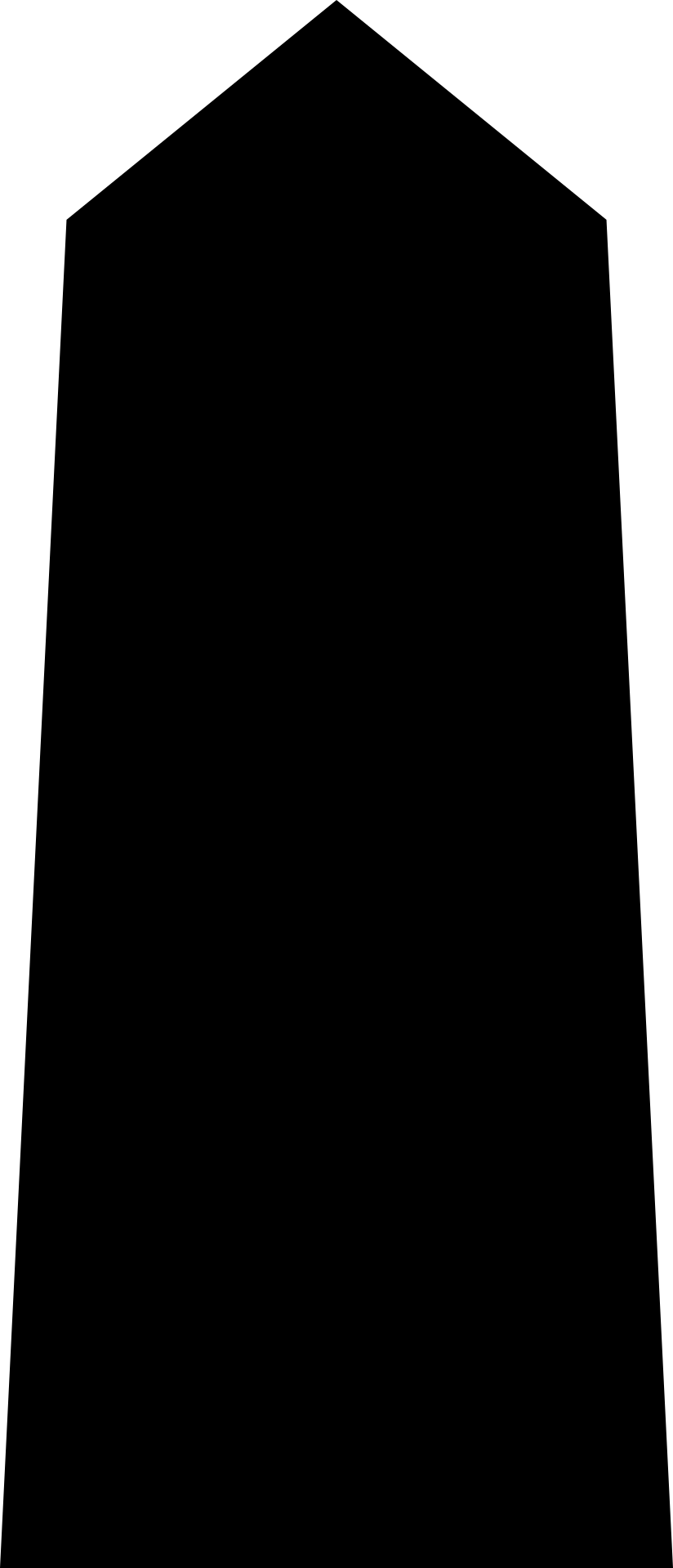
Rank group	Senior NCOs				Junior NCOs		Enlisted
Tunisian National Guard
Tunisian National Guard	وكيل أول; Wakil 'awal	وكيل; Wakil	عريف أول; Earif 'awal	عريف; Earif	رقيب أول; Raqib 'awal	رقيب; Raqib	جندي متطوع; Jundiun
Tunisian National Guard	Adjudant-chef	Adjudant	Sergent-chef	Sergent	Caporal-chef	Caporal	Soldat
