= Yosef HaCohen Yitzhaki =

18th-century Tunisian-Jewish rabbi

Yosef Yitzhaki Ha'Cohen

Personal life
- Born: Beylik of Tunis, Ottoman Empire
- Died: January 1787
- Buried: Mount of Olives Jewish Cemetery
- Parent: Yitzhak ben Shmuel (father)

Religious life
- Religion: Judaism

Jewish leader
- Predecessor: Masa'ud Raphael Alfasi
- Successor: Nathan Borgel
- Position: Chief Rabbi
- Ended: 1787
- Yahrtzeit: 23 Tevet

Rabbi Yosef HaCohen Yitzhaki (Hebrew: יוסף הכהן יצחקי; died January 1787 (Anno Mundi: 23 Tevet 5547)) was one of the great Jewish sages of Tunisia, and was head of the Beit Din as a Chief Rabbi in Tunis in the 18th century.

== Biography ==
Yitzchaki was born in Tunis in the 18th century, and was ordained a rabbi at the age of 17, who were impressed with knowledge of halakha. He was known in literature as Rabbi Yosef HaCohen Yitzhaki Hadin (Hebrew: הדיין, lit. 'the judge'). He came from a long line of esteemed rabbis, the son of Yitzhak, son of Shmuel, son of Avraham.

He was notable for his extensive knowledge of Kabbalah, and corresponded with other famed Kabbalists including Shalom Sharabi and Yosef Kalamaro. He signed haskamas for many books of halakha for that generation, including the Zera Yitzhak by Rabbi Isaac Lumbroso, who also would serve as a local Chief Rabbi in Tunisia.

In 1775, after the death of Masa'ud Raphael Alfasi, he was appointed to the rabbinical position in Tunis and served until his death in 1787. He was buried in the Mount of Olives Jewish Cemetery, and was replaced in his post by Rabbi Nathan Borgel.
