= Aharon Perez =

Tunisian rabbi (died 1766)

Personal life
- Died: 1766 Djerba, Ottoman Empire
- Occupation: Author

Religious life
- Religion: Judaism
- Synagogue: El Ghriba Synagogue
- Position: Rabbi

Aharon Perez (French: Aron Perez; died 1766) was a Tunisian rabbi, author, and a member of the Jewish community in Djerba.

== Biography ==
According to an oral account, Perez was originally from Fez, Morocco. He is said to have left the country with Masa'ud Raphael Alfasi and Shimon Lavi for Eretz Yisrael, to settle in Jerusalem. However, after seeing the deteriorated condition of the Jewish communities in North Africa, they decided instead to spread Jewish teachings in the communities, with Perez settling in Djerba. This legend, however, contradicts historical records that states he was originally from Djerba, the grandson of Shlomo Perez.

In 1758, he wrote a book called Bagdi Ahron (The Garments of Aaron), published in Livorno in 1806 by his grandson, Maimon Perez. His second book, Mishha Ahron (The Anointing of Aaron), was published at the same time. He is known for having established clear religious rules that are still in effect among the Djerban-Jewish community. He forbade the consumption of locusts, which had previously been considered kosher by the locals, and enacted the sounding of the Shofar on Rosh Hashanah.
