= Semah Sarfati =

Tunisian rabbi (1624–1717)

Semah Sarfati (1624–1717) was a Tunisian rabbi who was chief rabbi of Tunisia and was a member of the Bet din of Tunisia.

At the end of his life, he moved to the Holy Land, dying in Jerusalem in 1717. Following a schism between the Granas and Twansa communities, in which two of his students – Abraham Taïeb and Isaac Lumbroso respectively – both succeeded him as Chief Rabbi of Tunisia. Another student was Taïeb's successor, Masa'ud Raphael Alfasi.

Sarfati played an important role in the revival of Jewish study in Tunisia in the 17th century. While his judgements and commentaries have not been published in their own volume, his work has been cited by his students and their successors.

One of the oldest oratories in Hara, the Jewish quarter of Tunis, was named after Sarfati.
