= History of the Jews in Djerba =

Aspect of Tunisian-Jewish history

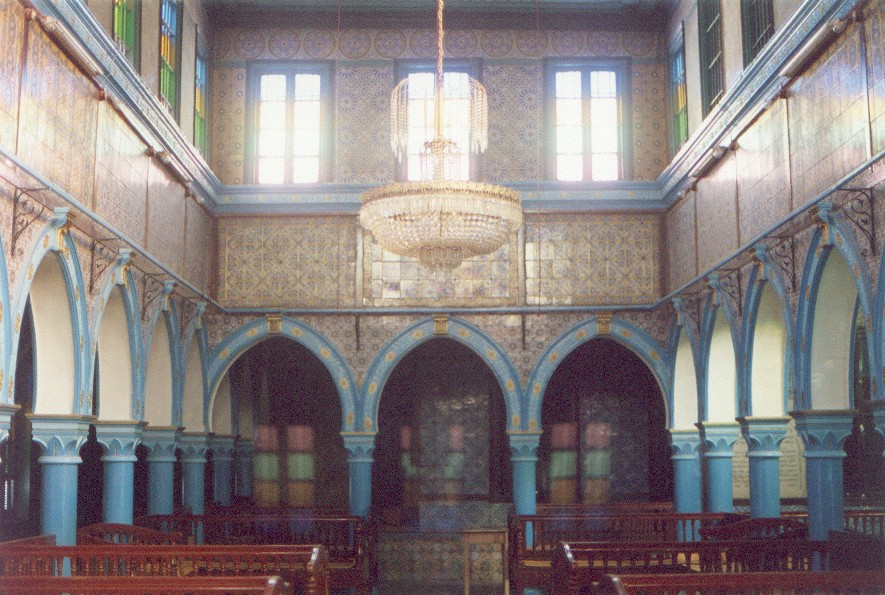
The interior of the El Ghriba Synagogue

The history of the Jews in Djerba stems from at least the Middle Ages, although many speculate that it extends back to the Classical Era. The community is one of the last remaining Jewish communities in the Arab world.

The community is typically divided between two villages on the Tunisian island of Djerba, off of its southern coast. The community remained small throughout history—at around 4,500 members at its peak—and hovered at about 700 at the beginning of 21st century. Since then, and due to a high birth rate, it has increased to 1,100. It is one of the best-known North African Jewish communities due to its longlasting survival, with thousands making an annual pilgrimage to the El Ghriba Synagogue on the 33rd day of the Counting of the Omer. Beginning in the mid-20th century, the community's population began declining due to the establishment of the State of Israel. The community's synagogue was attacked in a bombing in 2002 and a shooting in 2023.

== History ==
=== Founding of the community ===
Oral tradition of the Jews of Djerba, as well as the non-Jewish population of the island attest to the antiquity of the Jews in the community. Several founding legends date the arrival of the Jews to Djerba before the Common Era, but there is a lack of historical evidence to verify the claims. Regardless, some traditions within the community give credence to a pre-Medieval Jewish presence on the island, such as their liturgical customs of the Kiddush on Passover, or the reading of certain Prophets on specific days of Shabbat. Originating during the times of the Maccabees, these customs predate the standardization of Jewish liturgy by the Talmud. Many of the said traditions are common to other Jewish communities in Yemen and Tafilalet, which are known for their confirmed antiquity.

The most common local origin story for the Jewish community in Djerba is that Cohanim settled in Djerba after the destruction of the First Temple by Emperor Nebuchadnezzar II in 586 BC. Further claims were made that a door from the destroyed Temple, as well as various stones from the building, were incorporated into the local Temple. The story has resulted in many Jews claiming that the Synagogue, as the sole intact synagogue with pieces of the First Temple, as a unifier of world Jewry, hence its pilgrimage tradition. Through this story, the name of Dighet (the village in which the synagogue is located) is believed to be a corruption of the Hebrew דלת, delet, meaning "door". The village was also, until the 20th century, populated exclusively by Cohanim. The first written record of the story dates back to 1849, in the book HaShomer Emet ("The Keeper of Truth") by Rabbi Abraham Hayyim Adadi of Tripoli.

Other, less popular legends trace the Jewish community of Djerba to a period prior to the destruction of the First Temple. One legend states that Joab, a commander of King David's army, founded a community on the Island following maritime battles with the Philistines. Another story tells that the island was settled following the expedition of the tribe of Zebulun. Another states that local Jews are descendants of survivors who fled Jerusalem following the destruction of the Second Temple in 70 A.D. According to Midrashic and Jewish traditions, Ezra's curse on the Kohanim (priests) who refused to return to Jerusalem was a loss of their priestly stature and position. A tradition cited in The Times of Israel explains that certain Kohanim in Djerba refused to return because they did not believe the Second Temple was ordained by God. In response, Ezra cursed them and their children. A loss of priesthood: The Kohanim who remained in Djerba were cursed that they would not serve as priests in the Second Temple. This meant their refusal to help with the Temple's reconstruction resulted in their exclusion from its service. Isolation from Levites: The curse also stipulated that no Levite would ever come to the island of Djerba to provide them with service. In Jewish tradition, the Levites assisted the Kohanim in the Temple and were responsible for other communal religious duties. This part of the curse left the Kohanim of Djerba isolated, a consequence that tradition suggests came to pass. The Midrashic sources indicate that Ezra's curse was specifically targeted at those who refused his call to return from the Babylonian exile, including their descendants who remained in the diaspora. Yes, for refusing descendants: The intent of the curse was to penalize the spiritual apathy that caused some to prefer comfort in exile over rebuilding the holy community in Jerusalem. The curse on the children applied to those who followed in their parents' footsteps, choosing to stay abroad and demonstrating the same disregard for the Temple and the Land of Israel. No, for returning descendants: If a descendant of a family that initially refused Ezra's call later returned to Israel and re-established their roots, the curse would generally not apply to them. Rabbinic tradition often emphasizes repentance and return (teshuvah). The act of making aliyah (immigrating to Israel) is seen as a fulfillment of the divine commandment and an act of spiritual redemption.

=== Middle Ages ===
The first concrete historical evidence of a Jewish community in Djerba dates to the 11th Century. A merchant letter from the Cairo Geniza dated to 1030 refers to a Jewish man named Abū al-Faraj al-Jerbī (al-Jerbī meaning The Djerbian) living in Kairouan trading with eastern lands. Other letters from the same timeframe showcase the role of Djerbian Jews in Mediterranean trade routes during the time of the Byzantine Empire. A letter in 1060 is addressed to a Jewish man, Khalaf ibn Farah al-Zjerbi, who was living in Egypt and set to depart to Sicily. Another letter, written by a merchant in Tunisia to a man in Fustat, reports sending him 70 gold dinars entrusted to a Djerbian merchant in exchange for linen. The name of a Jewish person from the island appears in a list dated to 1107 in a list of those in need benefitting from alms from Cairo.

Many documents dated from the 12th Century document the raid of the island during the Norman conquest of southern Italy, during which many Jews were captured. A letter dated to 1136 documents the arrival of a ship in Alexandria carrying captives whose freedom was bought by the local community. One of them, "Isaac, son of Rabbi Sedaqa, captive among the captives of Djerba" presented himself freed from captivity in the first known document written by a Djerbian Jew, giving testimony about his time in bondage, writing from Tripoli to the Egyptians who bought his freedom.

The Sephardic rabbi and philosopher Maimonides wrote about the Jews in Djerba (which he refers to as al-Zirbi), giving the only description of the community's culture during the Middle Ages:

Be warned about some people who live in the western region called al-Zirbi which designates localities in the lands of Barbary, because they are stupid and rough [...] God is my witness and judge that they seem to me like the Karaites who reject the oral law. They totally lack clarity of mind, whether dealing with the Bible and Talmud or exhibiting aggadot and halakhot. Some of them are judges, but their beliefs and actions in matters of ritual impurity are like those of the children of the abomination, who are a nation among the nations that sojourn in the lands of the Ishmaelites. They refuse to see the ritually impure woman, do not look at her face or clothes, do not talk to her and do not tread on the ground on which she has set foot. They do not eat the posterior part of the animal.

As supported in Maimonides' quote, there was often a clash between religious groups due to characteristics of the Jewish community in Djerba, such as the existence of multiple rabbi-judges (dayyanim). They also referred to Ibadites, who composed a majority of the Muslim population on the island, as "children of the abomination". Arab geographer Al Idrissi, a contemporary of Maimonides, notes the propensity in the Djerbian community to exaggerate the requirements of ritual purity.

Little information is available on the historical events that the community faced during the Middle Ages. Persecution of the Almohads were briefly mentioned in a Hebrew poem where it is stated that the communities of El Hamma, Gafsa, and Jerba are "annihilated in the fullness of exile". In the 13th century, there was a community of Djerba's Jews established in Palermo, which was under Norman occupation. In 1239, they formed a community separate from the other Jews in the area. The rights to cultivate indigo dye and henna dye were granted to them by King Frederick II. Over the next few centuries, there are instances of Djerban Jews found in the responsa across the Maghreb, such as that of Salomon Duran of Algiers. Many of the responsa deal with economic issues and how Rabbinic law interacted with them. One example includes the entrusting of cattle to Muslims during the Sabbath, which demonstrated economic exchange between Jews and Muslims at the time.

=== Modern age ===
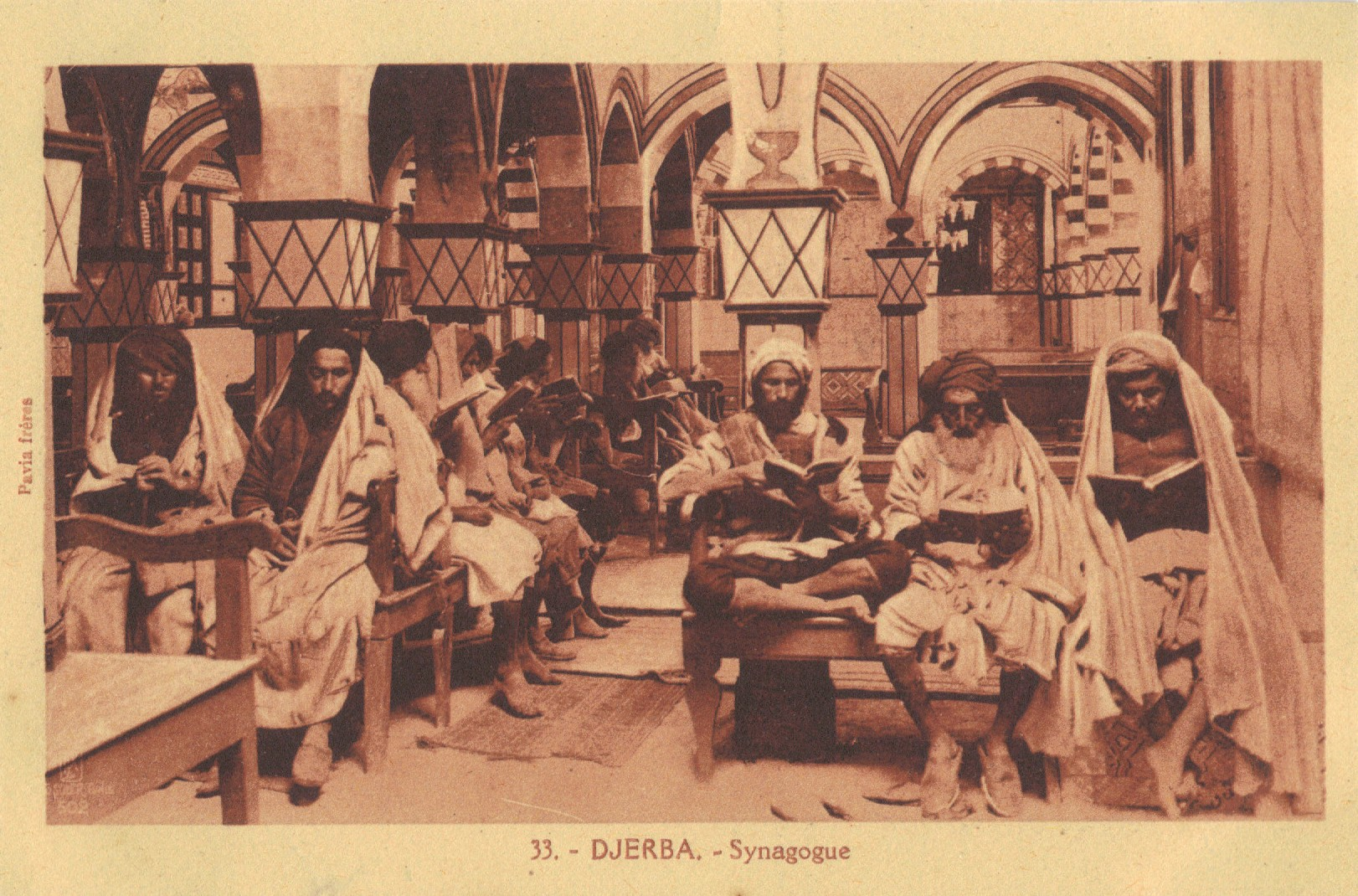
Interior of the El Ghriba Synagogue before 1930

Jews can be found referenced in 18th century tax registeris of the beylical government, which forced Jews to pay jizya, a traditional Islamic task that dhimmis (non-Muslims living in majority-Muslim lands) had to pay under Islamic law. There is evidence that the Jews obliged to the laws with little complaint and that they wore different clothes by law to distinguish themselves from Muslims. They were also forbidden from riding on horseback. One source recounts how Rabbi Shaul HaCohen broke down in tears after learning about the emancipation of Tunisian slaves in 1846, telling his followers that he had a premonition in a dream that the emancipation of the Jews would follow the freeing of the black slaves. A few years later, in 1857, the Fundamental Covenant of Mohammed Bey abolished discriminatory measures against Jews.

A religious revival of Judaism emerged in Djerba in the 18th century, as well as in Tripoli and Tunis. This intellectual revival, in tradition is attributed to three Moroccan rabbis who passed through on travel to Jerusalem. Seeing the deteriorated state of the North African Jewish communities, they provided local education. The Djerban educator was Aharon Perez. Although the story is not accurate, as those men were not contemporary to the same period, it is established that Perez did have roots in Djerba. Perez (died 1766) is known for having established many religious rules still active today in the Djerban minhag. He forbade the consumption of locusts, which until then had been considered kosher in the town, and instituted the blowing of the shofar on Rosh Hashanah.

==== Rejection of secular education ====
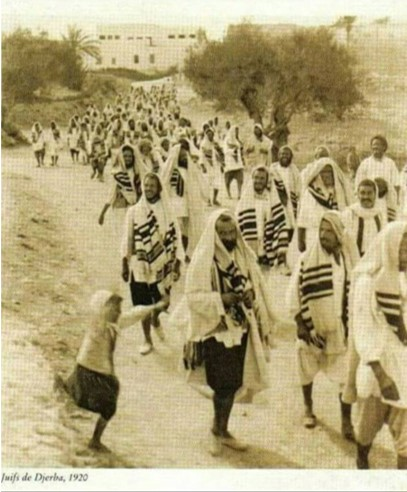
Jews of Djerba in 1920

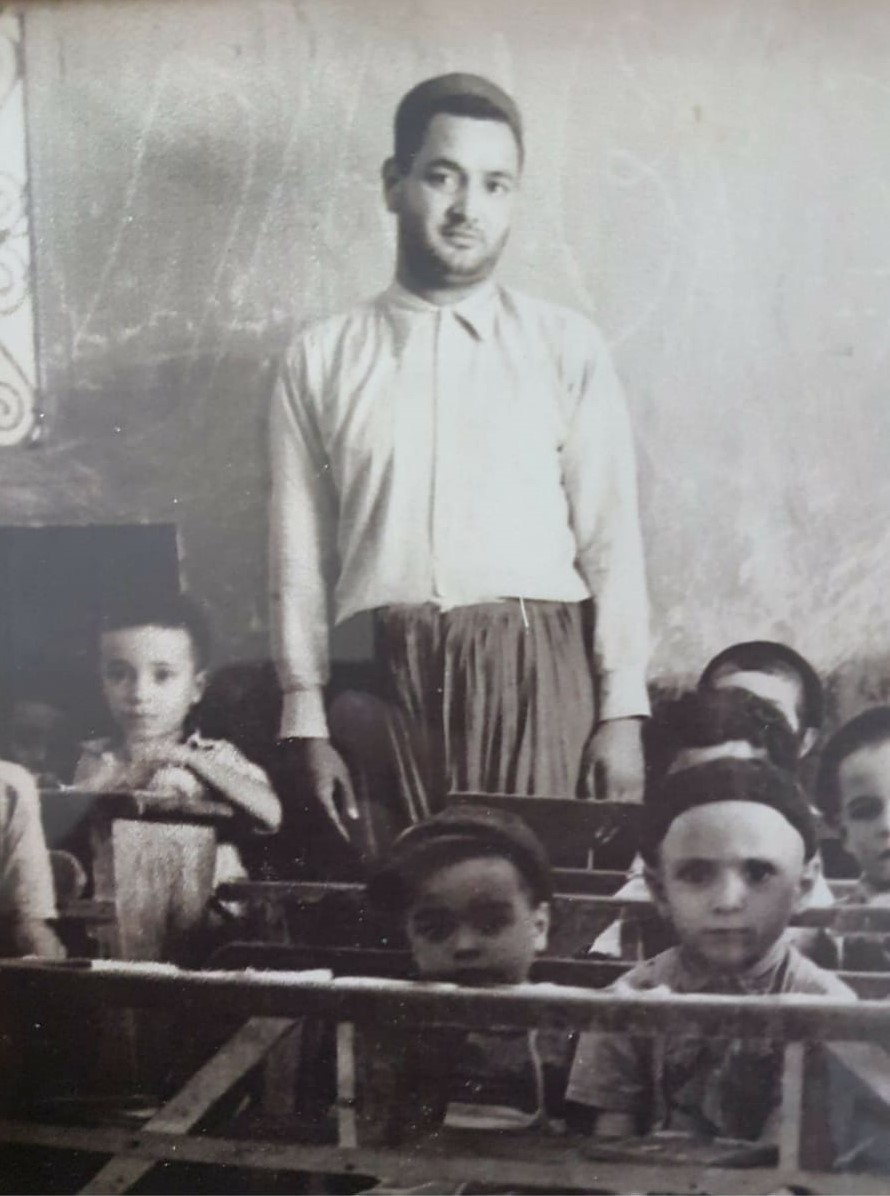
Jewish pupils with their teacher (Date unknown)

While the Alliance Israélite Universelle successfully established a network of schools in Tunisia, the Jews of Djerba, in fear of secularization, refused to open an AIU school in their community, similar to their boycott of secular schools under the French protectorate. This is in spite of pressure from notable Jews in Tunis and the local Qaid. The decision is a unique example in the history of the alliance. Djerban rabbis excommunicated any member who cooperated with the AIU, because they perceived a decline in knowledge and religious practice following secularization. They promoted traditional education, which consisted of male-only compulsory rabbinical education. The Djerbans were labelled "backwards communities, kept in abdjection and ignorance by rabbis refractory to any progress" by local authorities.

==== Success of printing press ====
The quantity of Jewish books printed in Djerba since the 20th-century establishment of the printing press has been remarked as exceptional. There are no less than 600 books published for a population that has never exceeded 4,500. The books were primarily intended for the local community, as well as other Jewish communities in southern Tunisia and the Maghreb. Some books were written by professional scholars, but many were written by regular artisans.

Prior to the introduction of the printing press to Djbera, the community had to import religious works via trading necessary for the study of Judaism. Hence, books were rare and expensive on the island. To publish their own works, they had to outsource printing to Livorno, Italy's printing presses, or even as far away as Palestine. In 1903, Rabbi David Aydan had the first printing press installed, and was popular throughout the 30s. The works of sages of previous generations in the region were also published, and there were as many as five printing presses belonging to Jews on the island. Most books were published either in Hebrew or Judeo-Tunisian Arabic. There were still two Hebrew printing presses in Djerba by the 1980s.

==== Departure ====
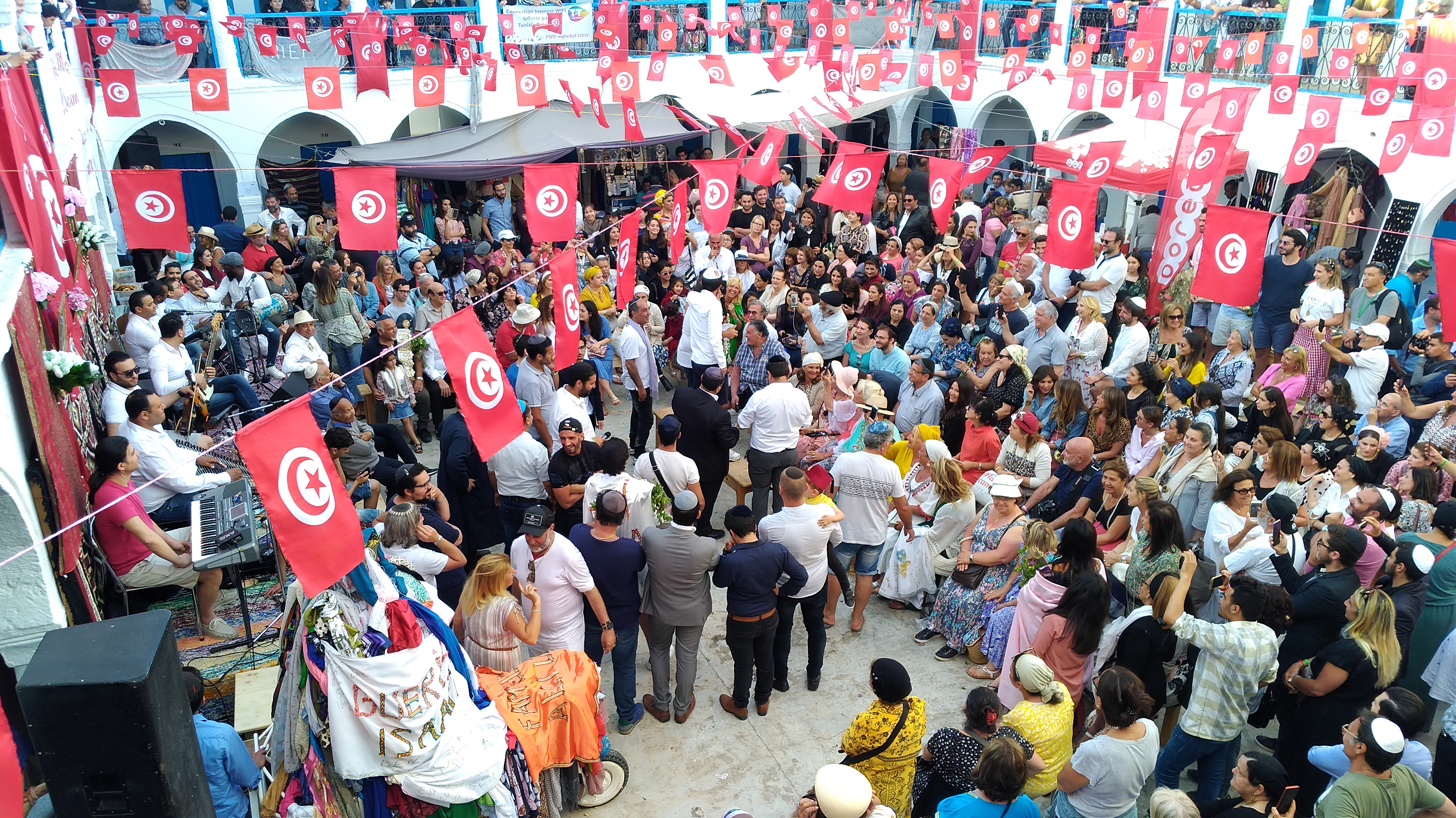
Ghriba Synagogue pilgrimage in 2019

Although there is still a community in Djerba in the 21st century, many mass departures have taken place since the 1950s, primarily to Israel, and some to France. The emigration of Djerban Jews was motivated by both the economic situation in Tunisia, as well as a deterioration in relations between Muslims and Jews since the establishment of the State of Israel. The three waves of departure, the first in 1948 after Israeli independence, the second in 1968–69 under pressure of President Habib Bourguiba following the Six-Day War, and the third wave in the 1980s, due to deteriorating relations, all significantly depleted the Jewish population of the island.

In 1985, a Tunisian soldier stationed in Djerba opened fire into the Ghriba synagogue compound, killing five people, four of them Jews. Another attack occurred in 2002, perpetrated by a 25-year-old Franco-Tunisian linked to Al-Qaeda. In 2023, a member of the Tunisian National Guard opened fire into the synagogue during the annual pilgrimage. Five people were killed before another National Guard member shot the murderer.

== Demographics ==
The Jewish community of Djerba numbered 3,800 in 1926, and had gone up to 4,300 by 1946. If the growth had continued at the same rate as the general Tunisian population, the island would have had 15,000 Jews by the 1980s. However, by the second half of the 20th century, waves of emigration emptied the community. The number of Jews in Djberba fell significantly in the coming decades.

Historical population

Year	Pop.	±%
1909 (est)	3,000	—
1921	3,779	+26.0%
1926	3,828	+1.3%
1931	4,098	+7.1%
1936	4,109	+0.3%

Year	Pop.	±%
1946	4,294	+4.5%
1956	2,864	−33.3%
1976	1,100	−61.6%
2003 (est)	700	−36.4%

Source: Haṭal, Avraham, ed. (1979). Regards sur les Juifs de Tunisie. Présences du judaisme. Paris: Michel. ISBN 978-2-226-00789-6.; Lasserre, Frédéric; Lechaume, Aline (2003). Presses de l'Université du Québec (ed.). Le territoire pensé (in French). Québec: Presses de l'Université du Québec. ISBN 978-2-7605-1224-5..

== Geography ==
Location of Hara Kbira and Hara Sghira in Djerba

Daughter communities of Djerba and other migrations of Djerbians forming an archipelago around the island

The Jewish population of Djerba is divided between two haras: villages that remained exclusively Jewish until the 20th century. Hara Sghira (small quarter), also called Dighet, not far from Ghriba, and Hara Kbira (large district), six kilometers to the north and now included in Houmt Souk, the largest city on the island. While the Jewish population of the Maghreb was generally concentrated in specific neighborhoods of predominantly Muslim cities, Djerba could be, according to Jacques Taïeb, "the only Jewish area in the Maghreb to have two entirely Jewish towns, a bit like the shtetls of Eastern Europe."

According to an interpretation by Valensi and Udovitch, "the two villages are organically linked and at the same time structurally opposed." Sghira is traditionally associated with the Near East, due to legend that priests of the Temple founded it. For a long time, it was inhabited only by Kohanim. Kbira's residents say that their origins are based in migration from the West. In the 19th century, Djerban migrants populated cities around Tunisia, forming an archipelago radiating around Djerba.

The community of Tatouine was founded by migrants from Shira, while the communities of Ben Gardane, Medenine, and Zarzis were founded by Kbirans. The divergent filtration implies that until reforms during Tunisian independence, religious jurisdiction was done independently of the other stud farm village.

== Synagogues ==
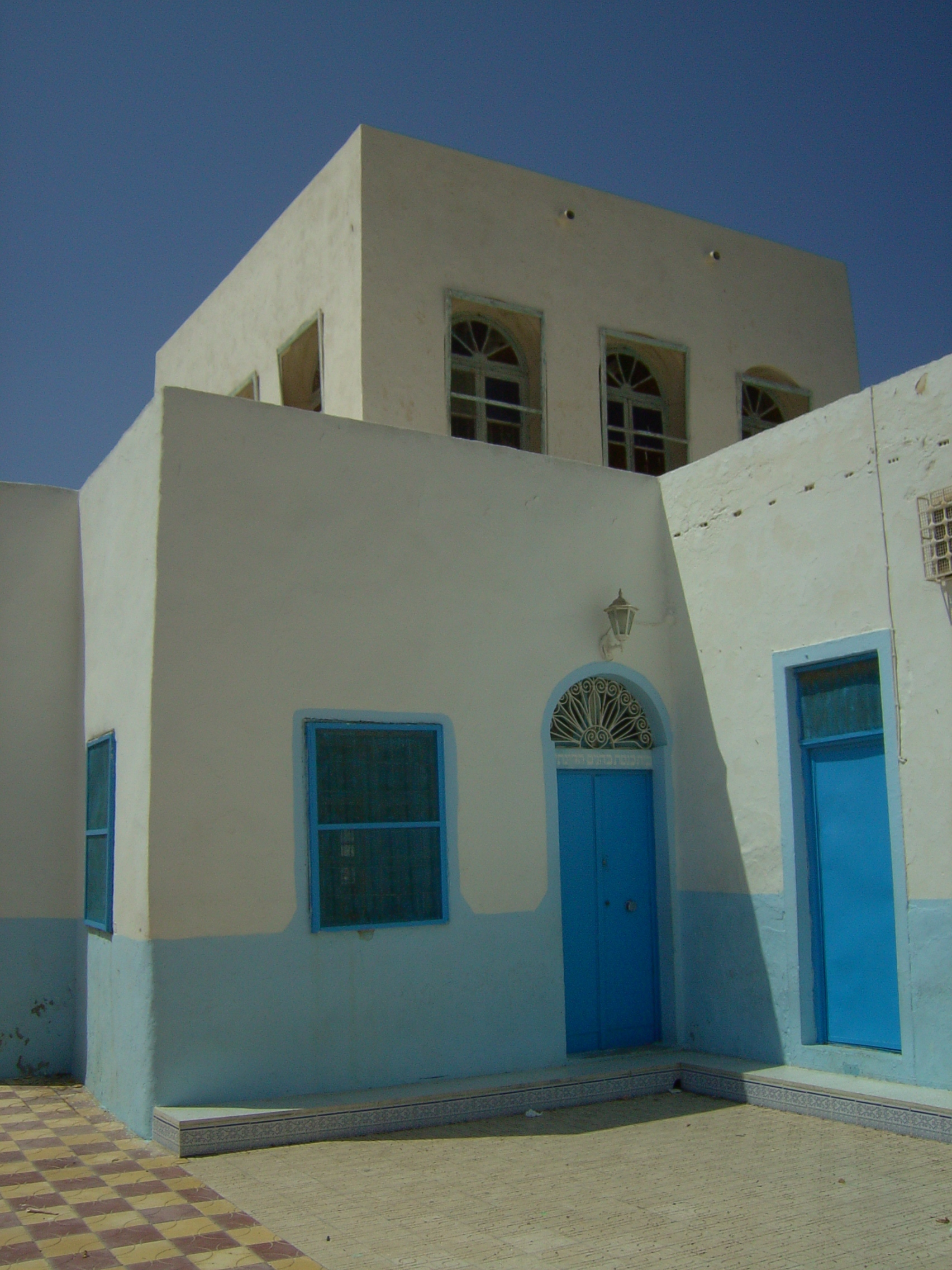
Synagogue of the Dightiya in Hara Kbira surmounted by a drum with twelve windows symbolizing the twelve tribes of Israel.

Djerba had as many as 20 synagogues when its peak population was 4,500. (Note: Women did not attend places of worship, so the ratio of worshippers to synagogues was about 1:20.) By the 1980s, 17 synagoges were still in operation. A synagogue in Houmt Souk is named after its founders, the Parientes, a family of Granas Jews from Italy. Eleven other synagogues in Kbira are named for rabbis, such as Rabbi Betsalel, Eliezer, and Brahem, or after their founding families (such as Dightiya from Sghira and trabelsiya from Tripoli). In Sghira, five synagogues have yeshivas.

Except for Ghriba Synagogue, all synagogues in Djerba and its surrounding communities were built according to a similar model. They all have features of splitting, along with a covered and open hall, both facing the direction of Jerusalem, which can be used for prayer. The open room is mainly used in the summer. During Sukkot, a sukkah is held there. Two minyans are sometimes held simultaneously. At the back of the covered room is the hekhal where the Torah scrolls are kept. In the richer synagogues, the walls are covered with blue earthenware and have alcoves where books are placed, and benches covered with a mat run along their length for study and rest. Closed tzedekah boxes hang on the wall, corresponding to various charities for the rabbis of Israel and the maintenance of schools. On the wings of the hekhal are silver plaques in the shape of a fish, a hand, and a censer on which are inscribed the names of deceased members of the community, along with candles lit in their memory. It is typically in synagogues, rather than cemeteries, where Djerbans recall the memory of deceased relatives. Some synagogues are surmounted by a drum with twelve windows symbolizing the twelve tribes of Israel.

There are often other smaller structures surrounding synagogues, often cemeteries. There are also sometimes libraries and study facilities nearby.

== Gallery ==
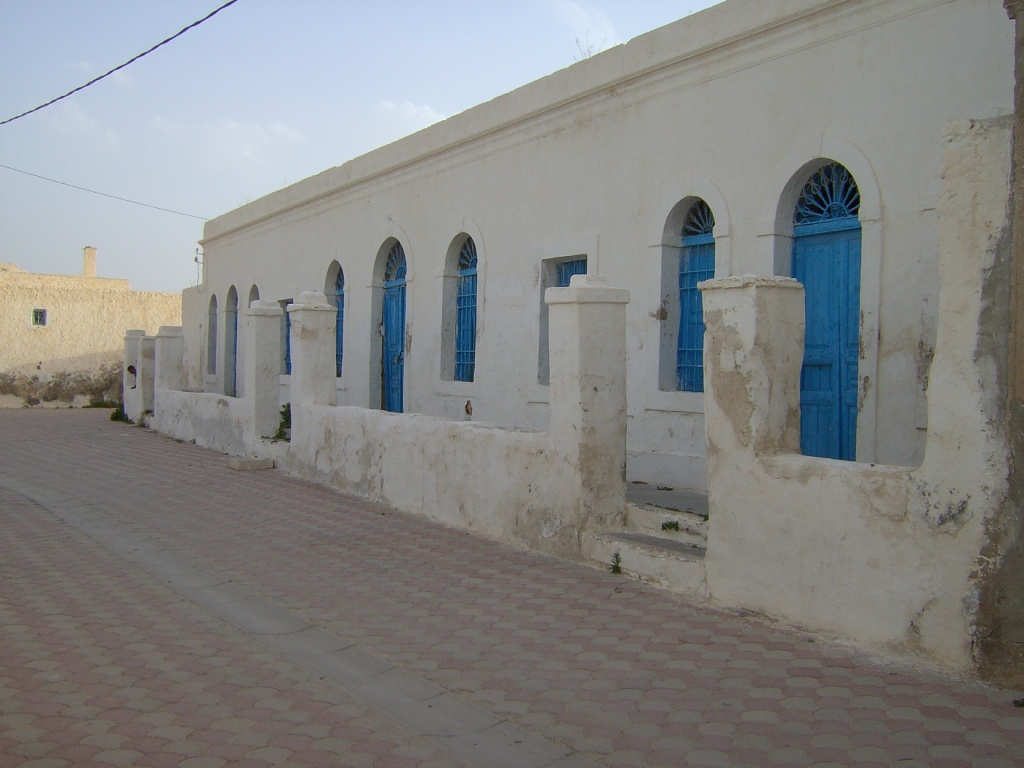
Former Hara Seghira Synagogue

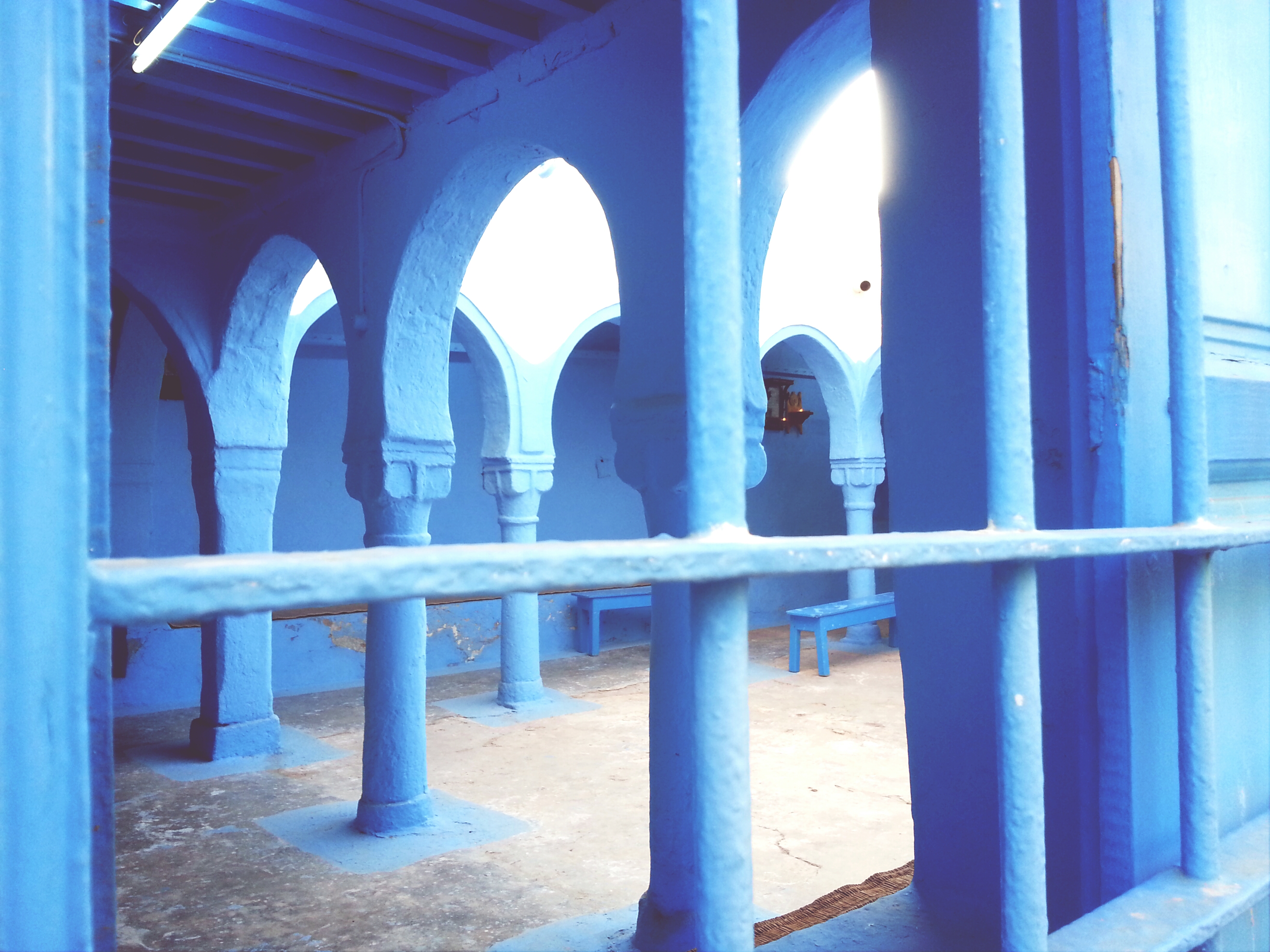
Yeshivat Hara Seghira

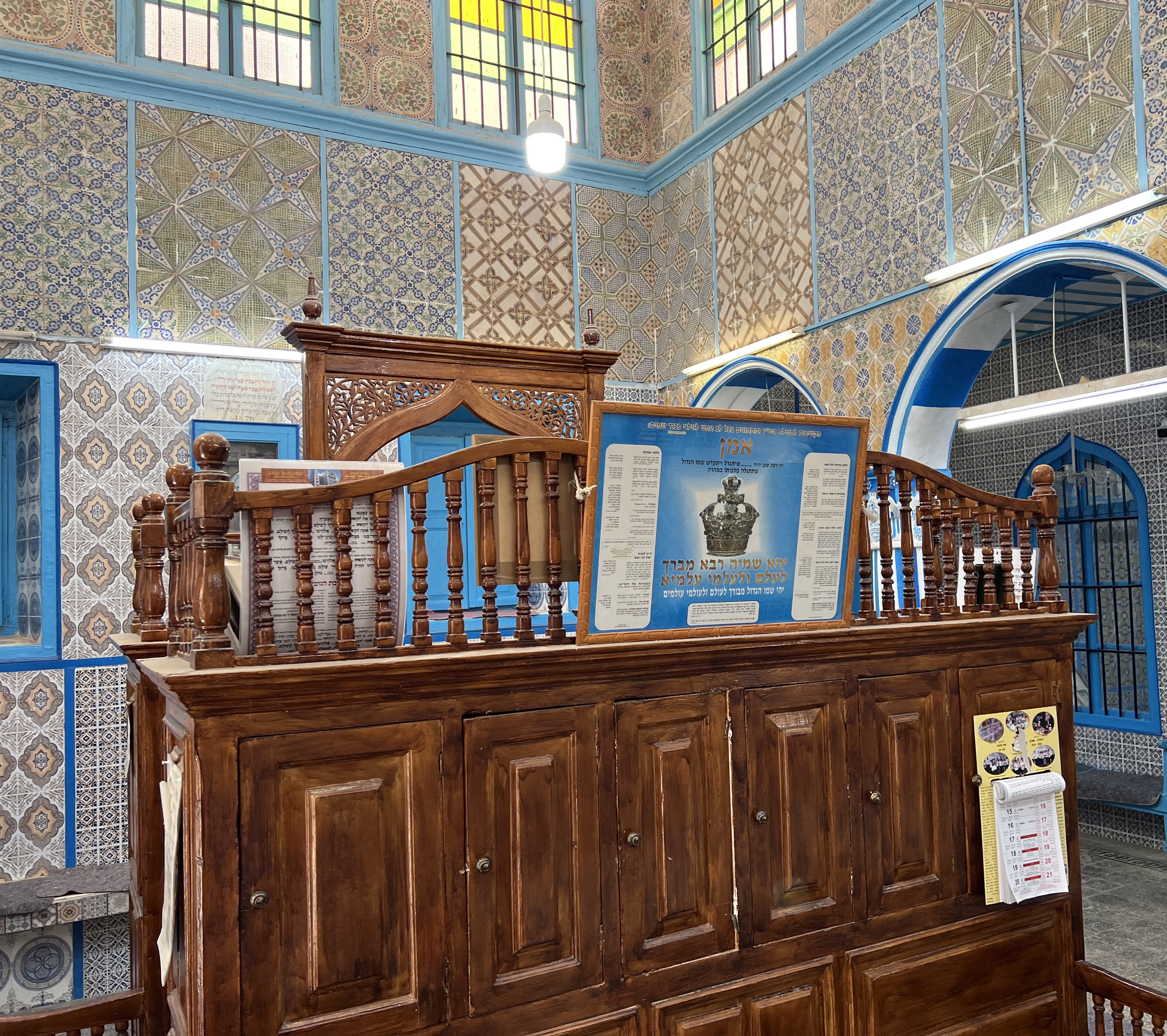
Pariente Synagogue

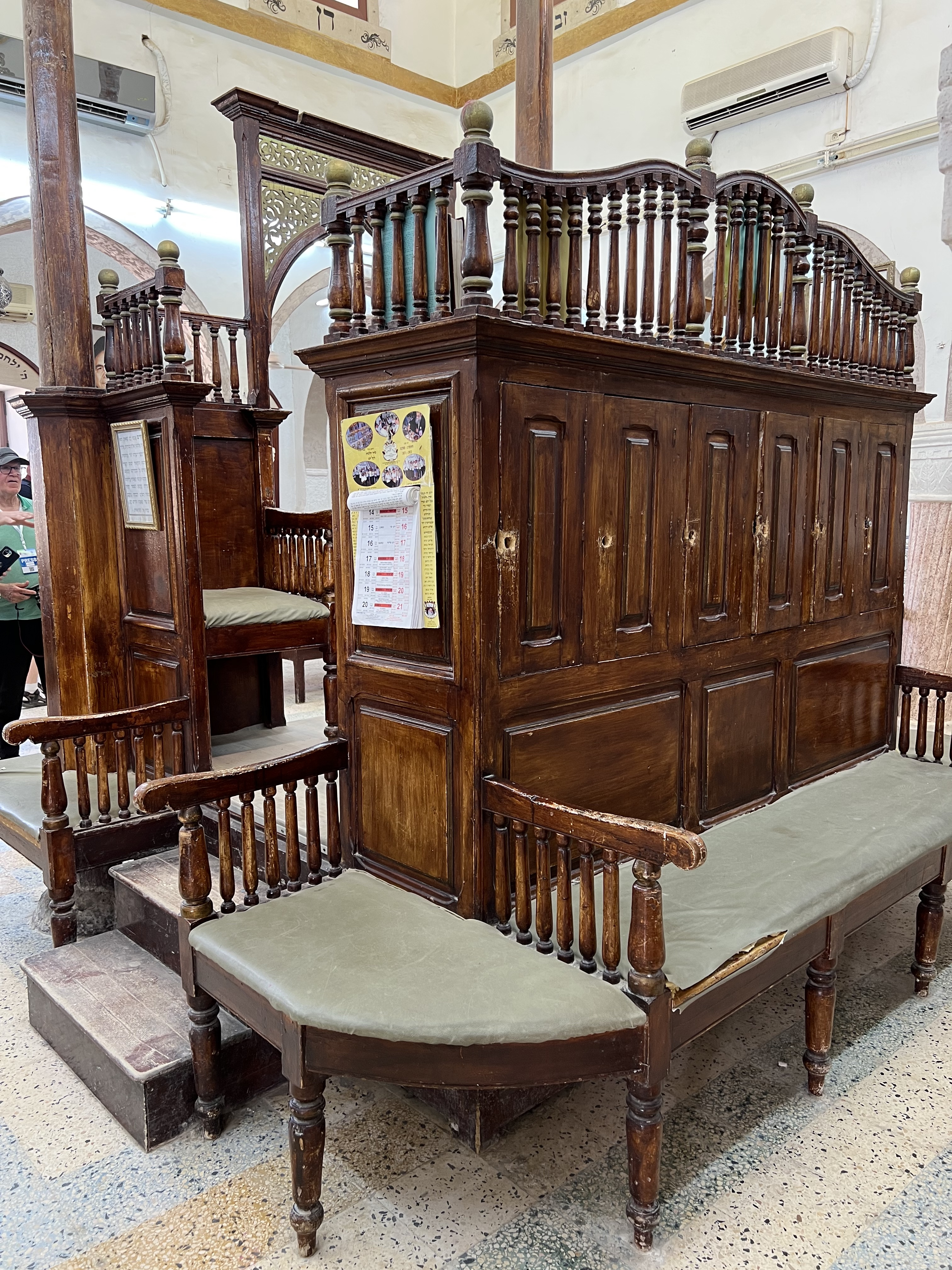
Slat Rabbi Pinhas Synagogue

== Genetic studies ==
The Jewish community on the island of Djerba is of particular interest to researchers, with traditions dating back to the time of the destruction of the First Temple. Two studies have attempted to test the antiquity of the community:

1. The first was conducted by Gérard Lucotte and his colleagues in 1993.
2. The second was by anthropologist Franz Manni and his colleagues in 2005.

The studies concluded that the paternal genetic heritage of the Jews on the island differed from the Arabs and Berbers present. Lucotte showed that 77.5% of the samples tested are haplotype VIII (similar to haplogroup J). The second showed that 100% of Jewish samples are haplogroup J2. The Manni's study suggests it is unlikely that there was an early colonization of Djerba, while Lucotte states that it is difficult to determine whether the high frequency of J represents an ancestral relationship with pre-exile Jews. Both studies suggest that the paternal genetic heritage of North African Jews in Djerba mainly comes from the middle east, with a significant minority of Berber DNA.

== See also ==
- La Ghriba, a documentary film
- Mizrahi Jews
- History of the Jews in Tunisia
- List of synagogues in Tunisia

== Sources ==
- Valensi, Lucette; Udovitch, Abraham (1984). Juifs en terre d'islam : les communautés de Djerba (in French). Paris: Archives contemporaines. ISBN 2-903928-05-3.
- Taïeb, Jacques (2000). Sociétés juives du Maghreb moderne: 1500-1900 un monde en mouvement. Paris: Maisonneuve & Larose. ISBN 978-2-7068-1467-9.
