= Hara Seghira Synagogue =

Former Orthodox synagogue on Djerba, Tunisia

- Arabic: كنيس حارة صغيرة
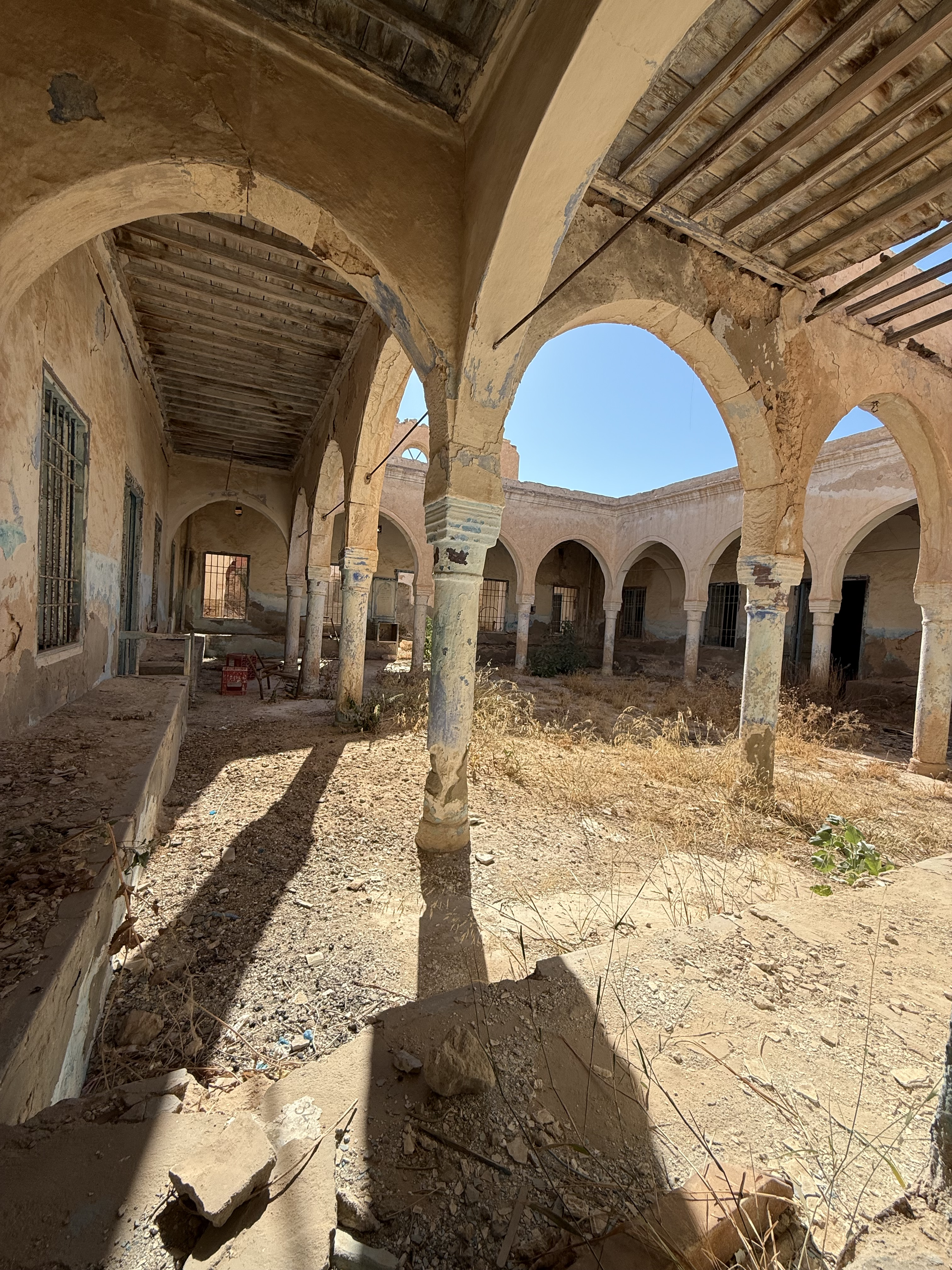
- The dilapidated courtyard of the former yeshiva, in 2025

- Location of the former synagogue in Tunisia

Religion
- Affiliation: Orthodox Judaism (former)
- Rite: Nusach Edot haMizrach
- Ecclesiastical or organizational status: Synagogue and yeshiva (????–1970s)
- Status: Abandoned

Location
- Location: Moktar Attia Street, Er Riadh, Djerba
- Country: Tunisia
- Interactive map of Hara Seghira Synagogue
- Coordinates: 33°48′50″N 10°51′34″E

Architecture
- Type: Synagogue architecture

The Hara Seghira Synagogue or Yeshiva Dighet (Arabic: كنيس حارة صغيرة، يشيفا ديغت) is a former Orthodox Jewish congregation, synagogue, and yeshiva, located on Moktar Attia Street, just north of Place L’Independence, in the town of Er Riadh on the island of Djerba, Tunisia. The synagogue and yeshiva ceased to operate in the 1970s.

Er Riadh is the modern name for the ancient Jewish village of Djirt, which became known as “Hara Seghira” or the “Small Ghetto”. As the Jewish community of the village declined, the synagogue and yeshiva were abandoned and the building fell into a state of dilapidation. The Jewish community of Er Riadh, numbering around 80, is centered on the El Ghriba synagogue, located on the southern outskirts of the village.

In 2023 Djerba was declared a UNESCO World Heritage Site.

== Gallery ==
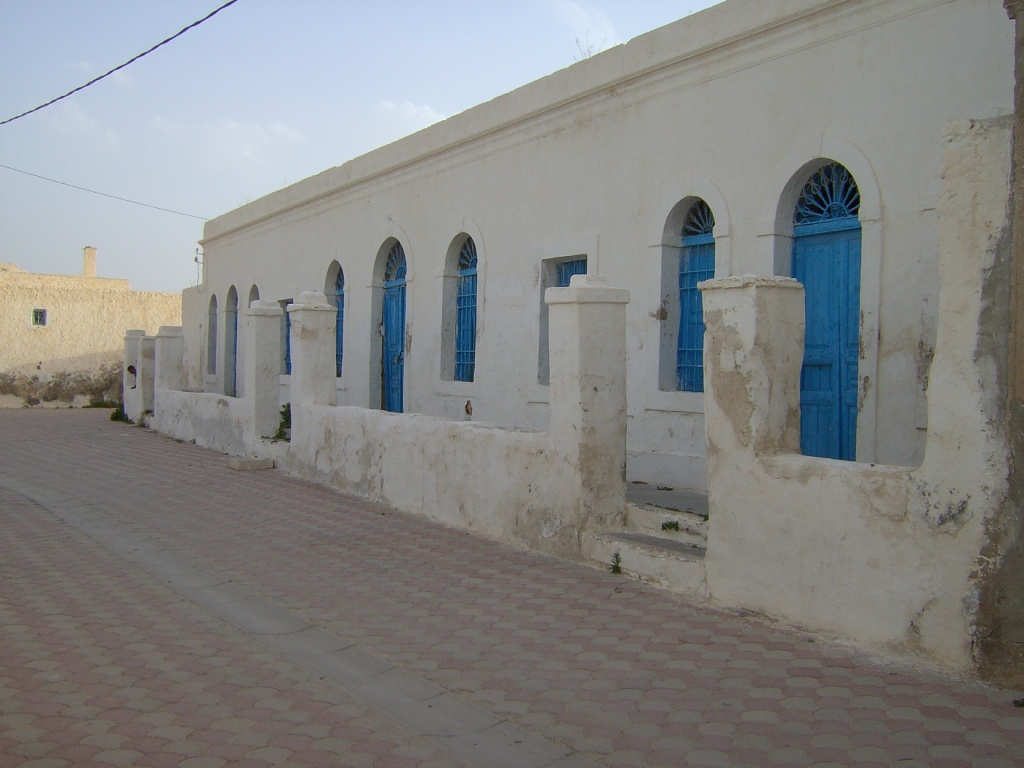
The façade of the former yeshiva, in 2007

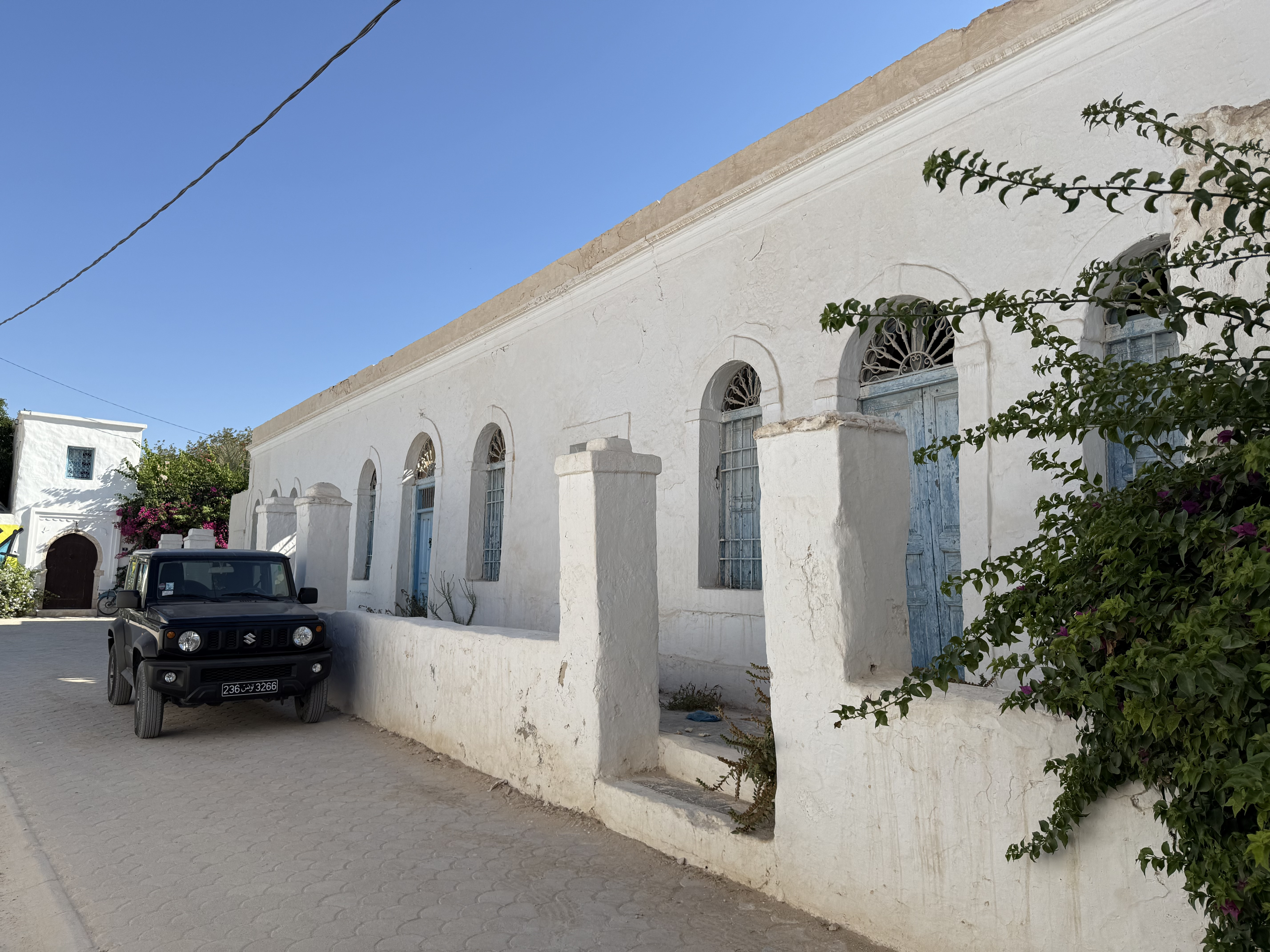
The façade of the former yeshiva, in 2025

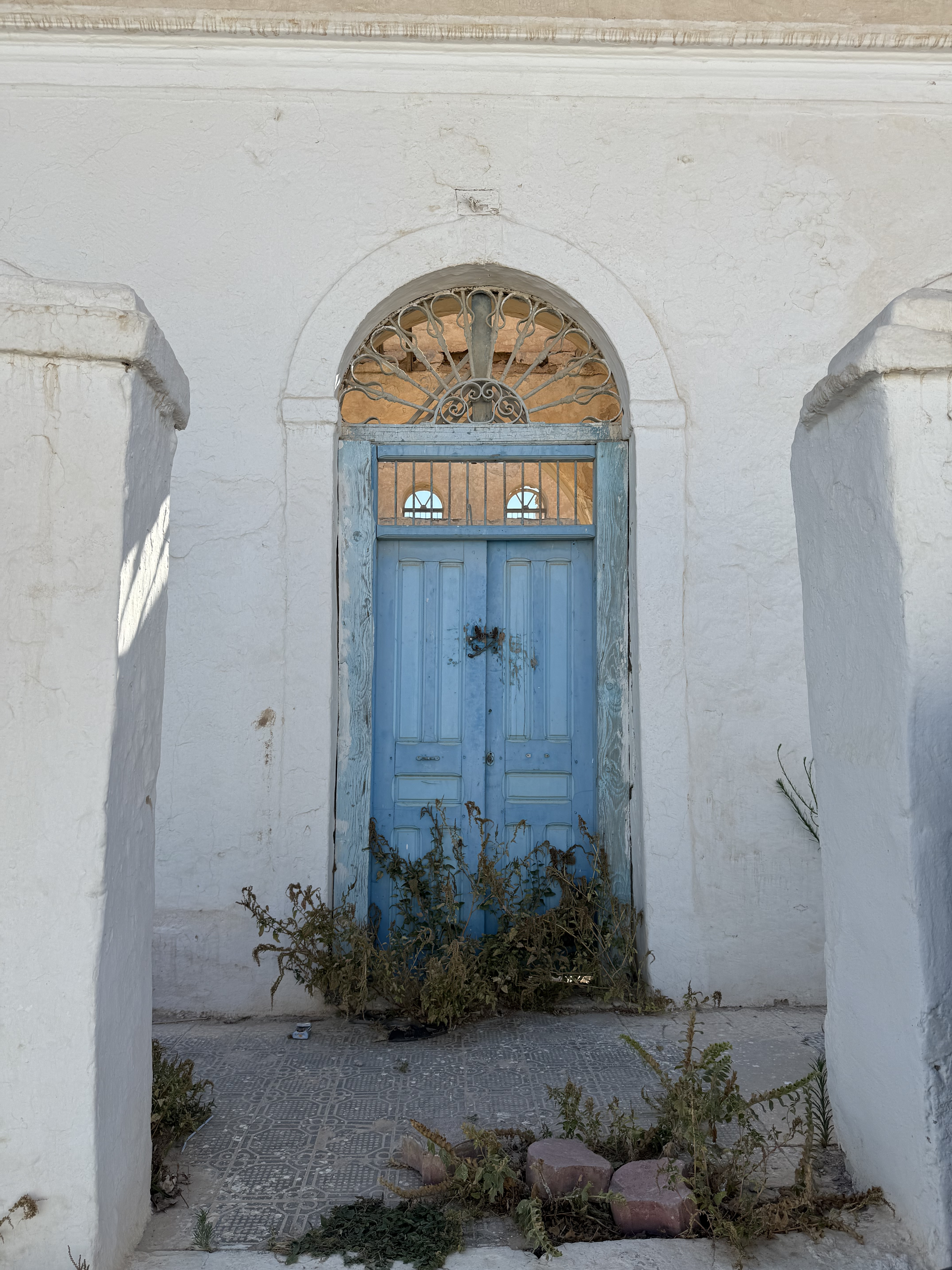
The entrance to the former yeshiva, in 2025

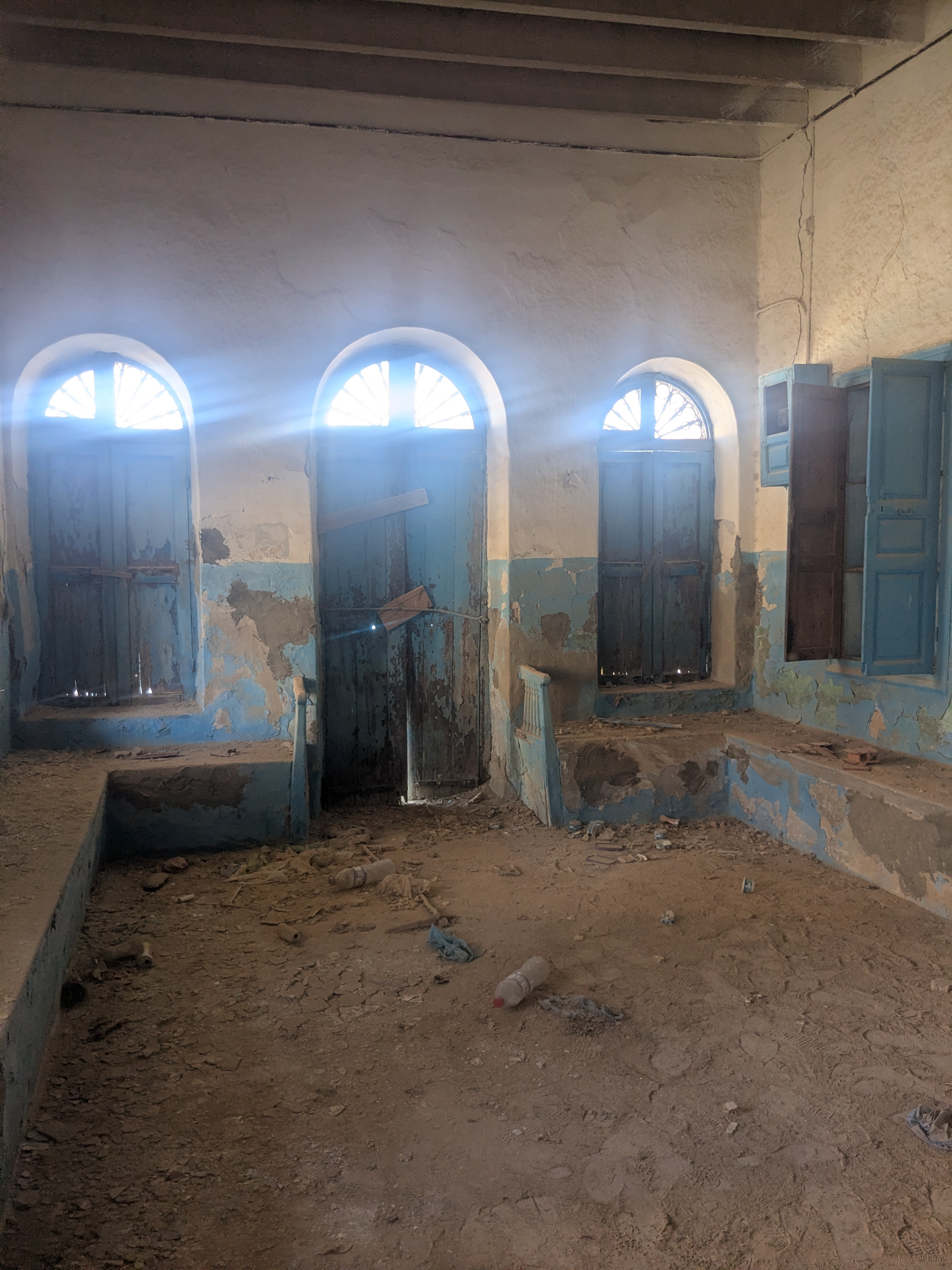
Courtyard Annex Room of Hara Seghira Synagogue in 2026

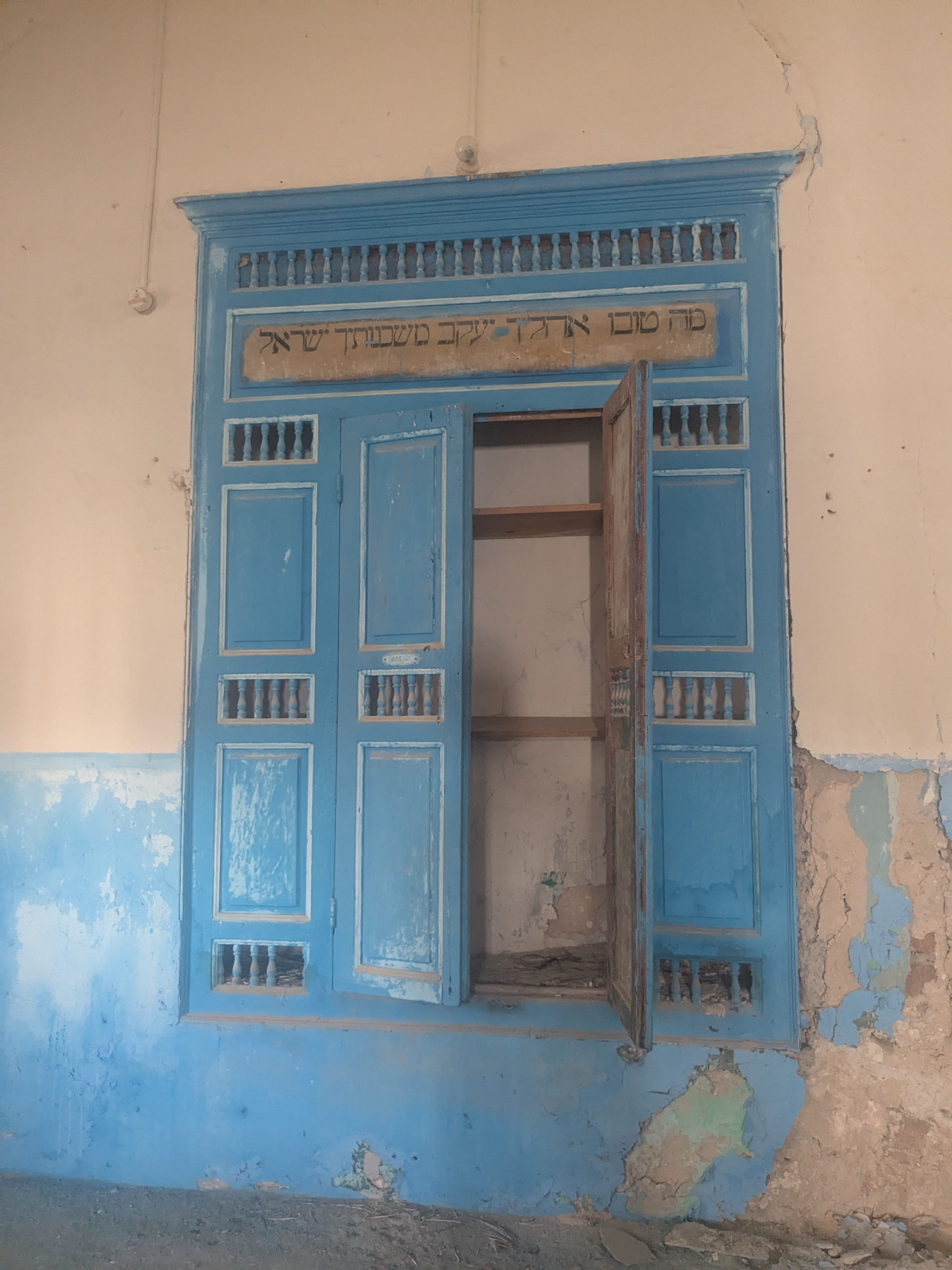
Cupboard from Courtyard Annex Room of Hara Seghira Synagogue in 2026

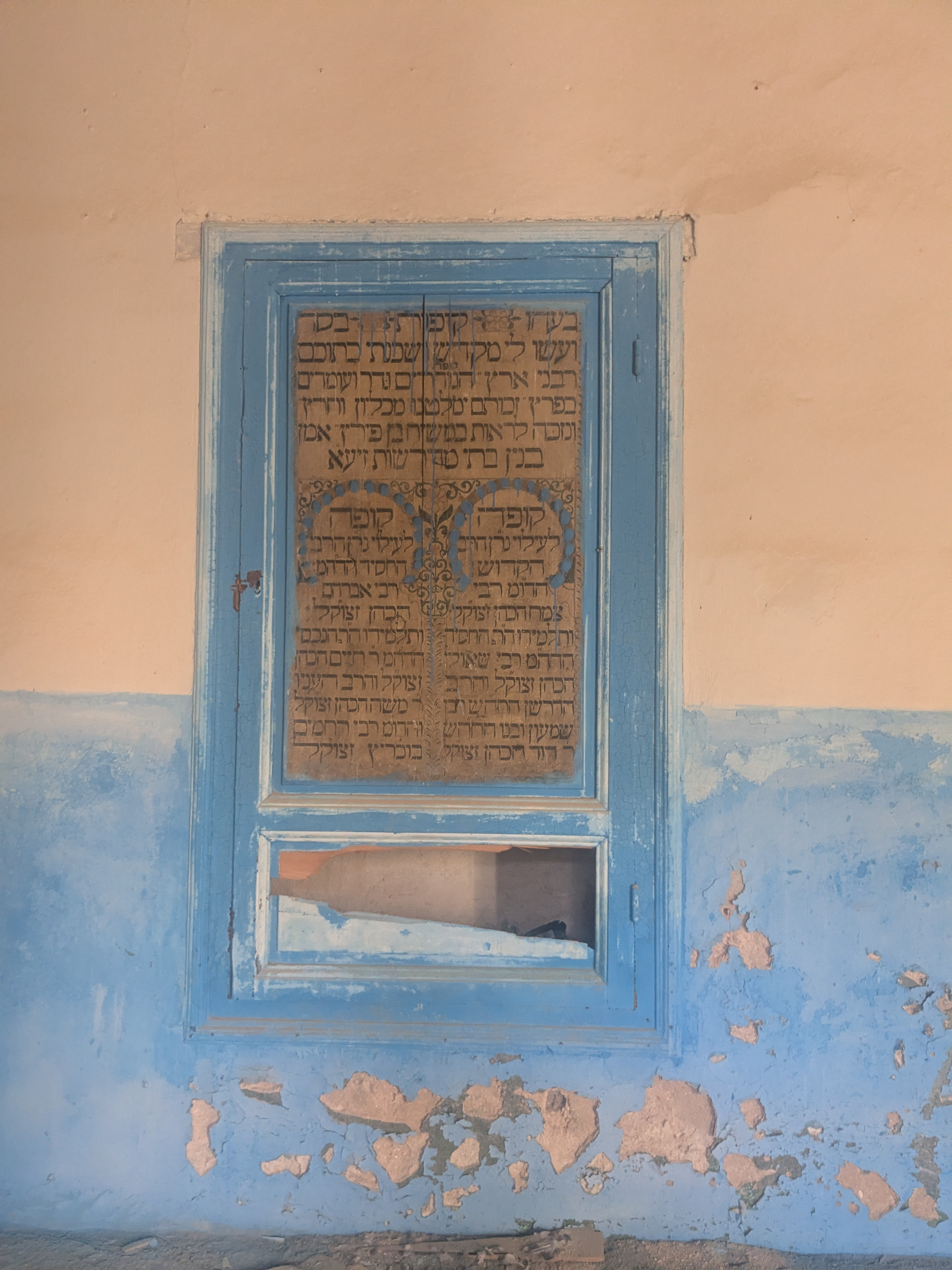
Donation Boxes in Courtyard Annex Room of Hara Seghira Synagogue in 2026

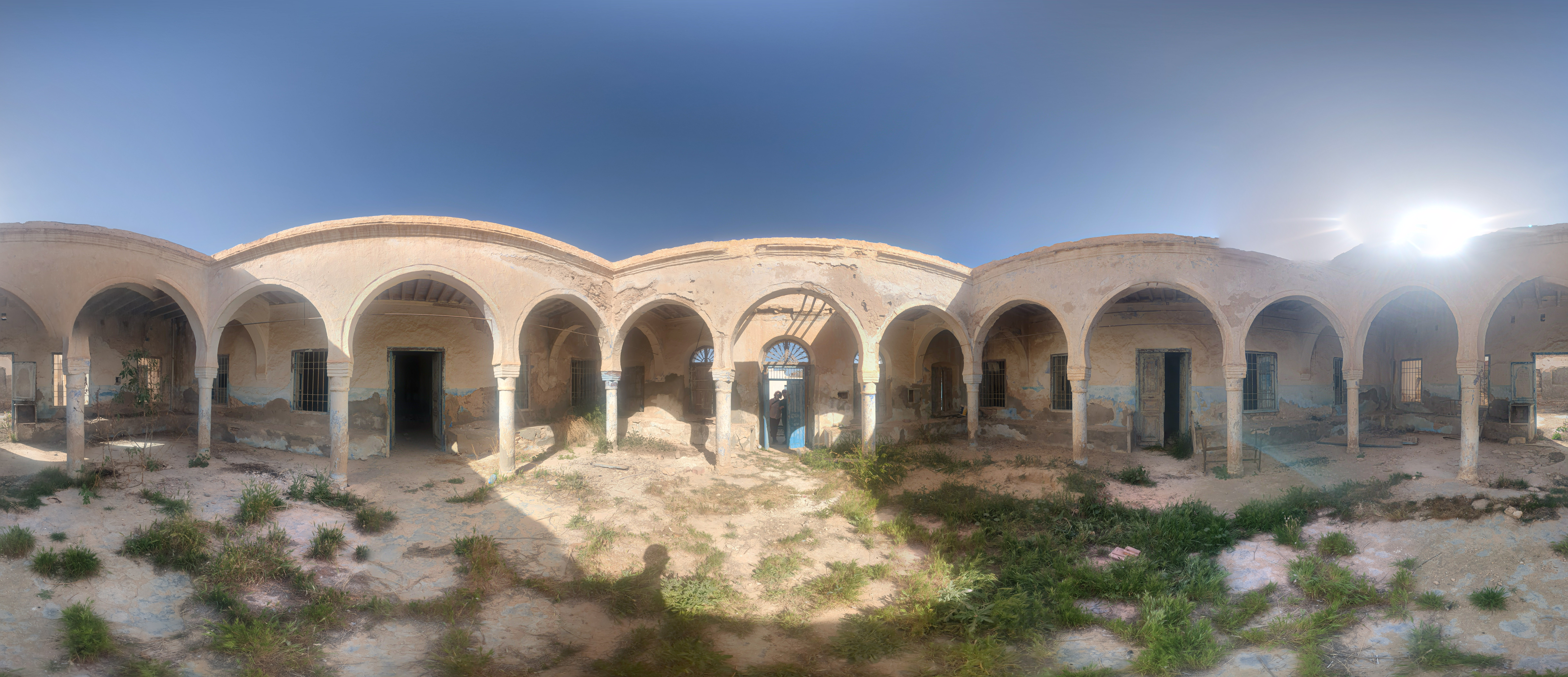
Courtyard of Hara Seghira Synagogue in 2026

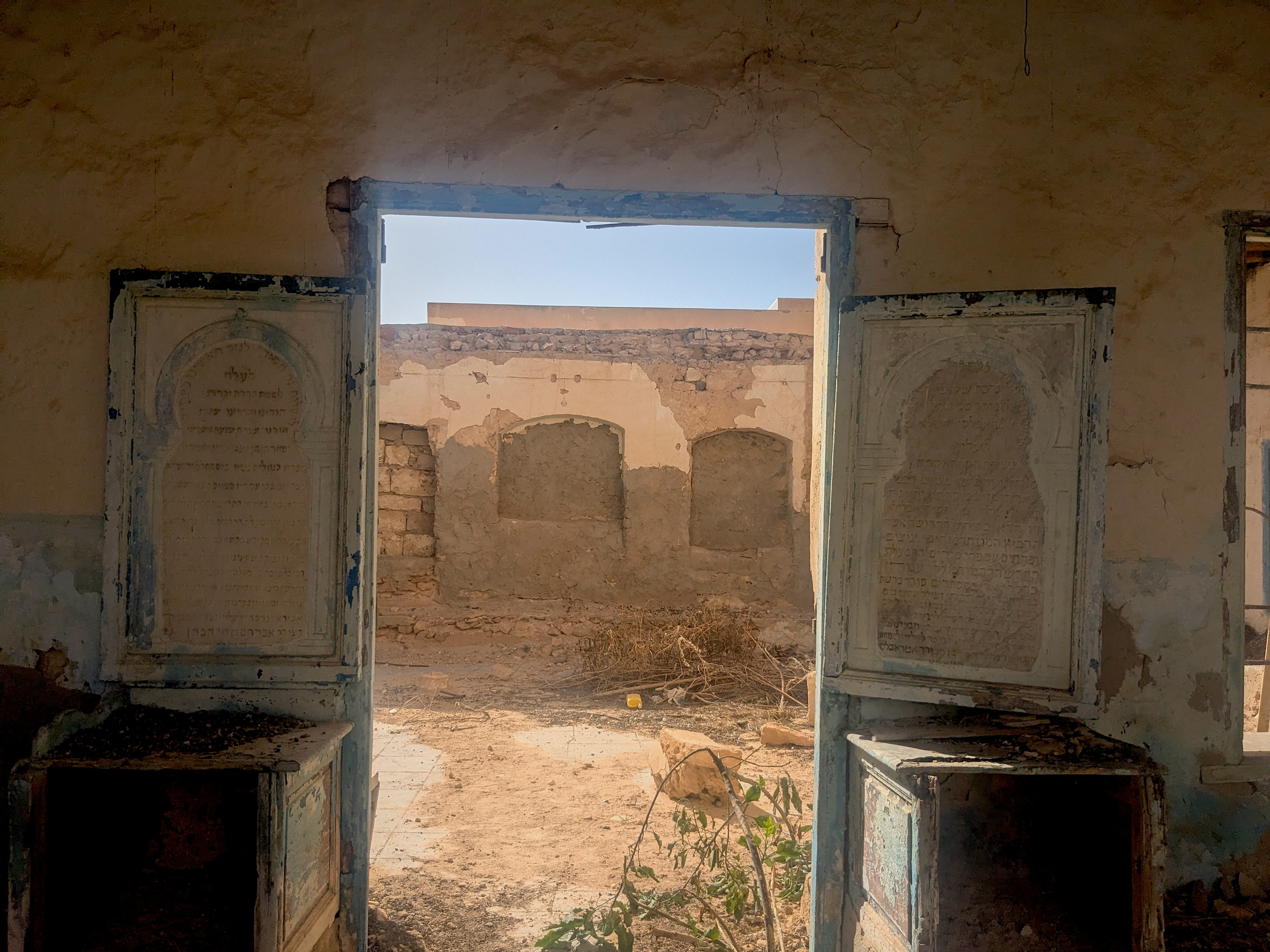
Plaques from Courtyard Annex Room of Hara Seghira Synagogue in 2026

== See also ==
- History of the Jews in Djerba
- List of synagogues in Tunisia
