= Synagogue of the Kohanim of Djirt =

Orthodox synagogue on Djerba, Tunisia

Synagogue of the Kohanim of Djirt (Beit Knesset Kohanim HaDintreisa)
- Hebrew: בית הכנסת כהנים הדינתרייתא; Arabic: كنيس كوهانيم جيرت
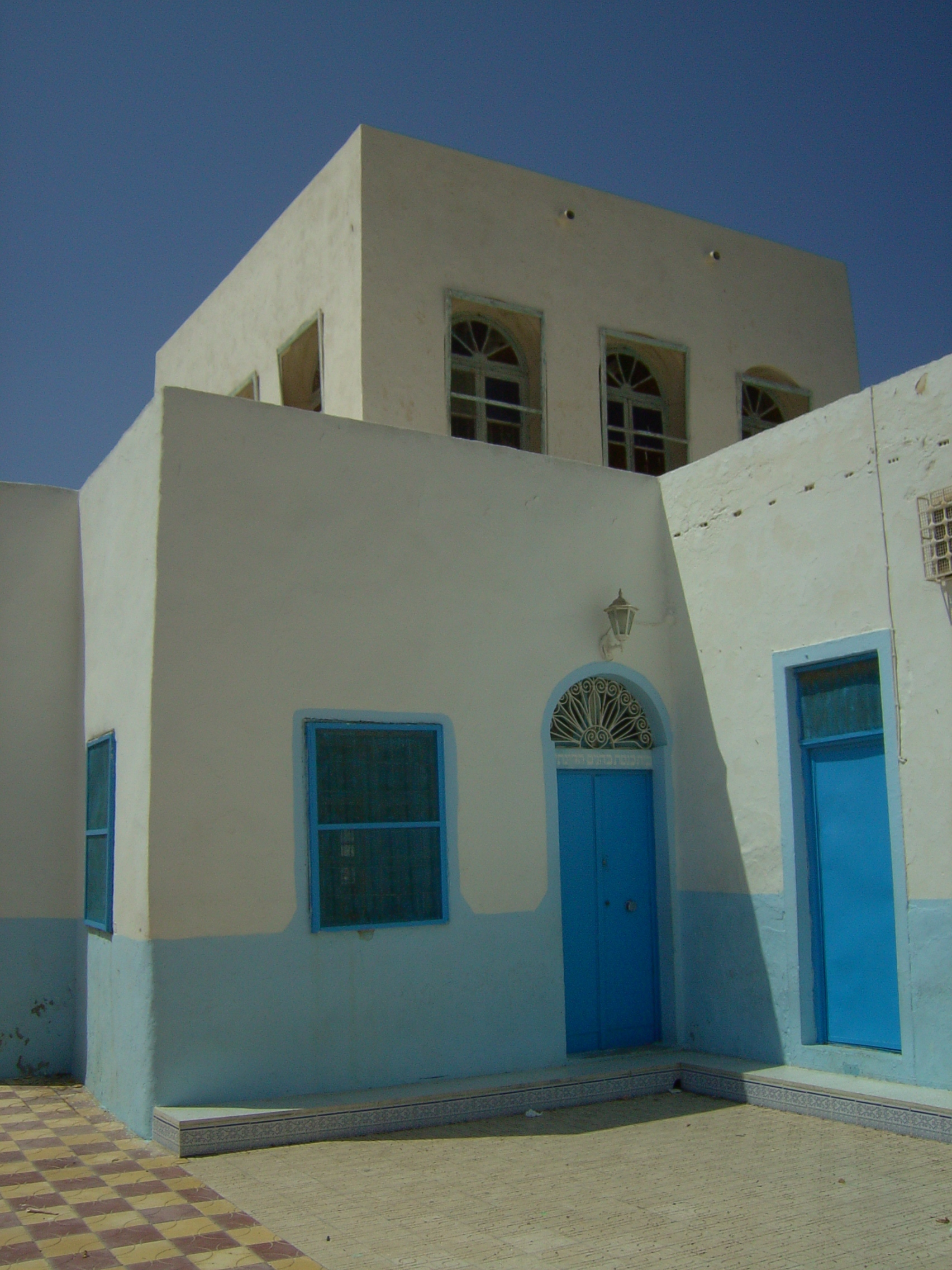
- The synagogue exterior, in 2007

- Location of the synagogue in Tunisia

Religion
- Affiliation: Orthodox Judaism
- Rite: Nusach Edot HaMizrach
- Ecclesiastical or organizational status: Synagogue
- Status: Active

Location
- Location: Er Riadh, Djerba
- Country: Tunisia
- Interactive map of Synagogue of the Kohanim of Djirt (Beit Knesset Kohanim HaDintreisa)
- Coordinates: 33°51′50″N 10°52′06″E

Architecture
- Type: Synagogue architecture

The Synagogue of the Kohanim of Djirt (Hebrew: בית הכנסת כהנים הדינתרייתא, romanized: Beit Knesset Kohanim HaDintreisa, lit. 'Synagogue of the Priests of Djirt'; Arabic: كنيس كوهانيم جيرت) is an Orthodox Jewish congregation and synagogue, located in Hara Kbira "Greater Neighborhood", the Jewish neighbourhood on the outskirts of Houmt El Souk, the main town on the island of Djerba, Tunisia.

In 2023 Djerba was declared a UNESCO World Heritage Site.

== History ==
The synagogue is named after the ancient Jewish village of Djirt, modern day er-Riadh, also known as Hara Sghira "Smaller Neighborhood”, which is located south of Houmt El Souk. According to tradition, it was in this village where the first Jews, members of the kohanim who were exiled from Jerusalem at the time of the destruction of Solomon's Temple in Jerusalem, settled. The inside is lavishly covered with decorative coloured tiles.

The synagogue is to be distinguished from the El Ghriba Synagogue. El Ghriba's founding is also traced to the flight of priests from the destruction of the Second Temple during the Siege of Jerusalem (70 CE). Legend tells that they brought with them a door of the Temple, which is covered over in a wall of the synagogue.

== See also ==
- History of the Jews in Djerba
- List of synagogues in Tunisia
