= Mordecai Baruch Carvalho =

Mordecai Baruch Carvalho (or Carvallo) (Hebrew: מרדכי ברוך קרבאליו or קרבליו; c. 1705 – January 1785) was a wealthy merchant and rabbi from Tunis.

He devoted part of his time to rabbinical studies, and in 1752 succeeded his teacher, Isaac Lumbroso, whose best pupil he was, as rabbi of the Leghorn congregation of Tunis. Throughout the country he enjoyed a high reputation as a rabbinical authority.

His publications are:

- To'afot Re'em (The Strength of a Unicorn), commentary on the work of Elijah Mizrachi (Leghorn, 1761)
- Mira Dakya (Pure Myrrh), commentary and miscellanies on various tracts of the Babylonian Talmud, and on Maimonides' Yad ha-qazaqah (Leghorn, 1792).

He also published the uncompleted work of his son, Isaac Carvalho, who died in January 1759 at the age of twenty-eight. This work, entitled Sefer ha-Zikronot we-Chayye Yitzchaq (Book of Records, and the Life of Isaac), and published together with the elder Carvalho's To'afot Re'em, contains a commentary on the works of Mizrachi, miscellanies on various tracts of the Talmud, and four funeral orations. Carvalho died in 1785, at an advanced age.
