= Isaac Lumbroso =

Isaac Lumbroso (1680–1752) was a chief rabbi of Tunis and rabbinical author.

He was prominent in Tunisian Jewry, being judge of the community about 1710, an epoch coinciding with the schism which divided the Jews of the city into two camps, native Tunisians and Gournis or Italians. Lumbroso was appointed rabbinical judge of the latter; and, being a man of means, he filled at the same time the position of receiver of taxes to the bey, as well as that of Qaid or official representative of his community.

From a literary point of view, Lumbroso, who was one of the most brilliant pupils of Rabbi Semaḥ Sarfati, was the most important among the Tunisian rabbis of the eighteenth century. He encouraged and generously assisted his fellow rabbis; and his reputation as a Talmudist and Kabbalist survived him. He and Joshua Cohen Tanuji were both disciples of Abraham Taïeb.

Lumbroso was the author of "Zera' Yiẓḥaḳ," published posthumously at Tunis in 1768. This work is a commentary on the different sections of the Talmud. Several funeral orations, pronounced by Lumbroso on diverse occasions, are appended thereto.

== See also ==
- Mordecai Baruch Carvalho
