= Masa'ud Raphael Alfasi =

Tunisian rabbi (died 1776)

Rabbi Masa'ud Raphael Alfasi
- מסעוד רפאל אלפאסי
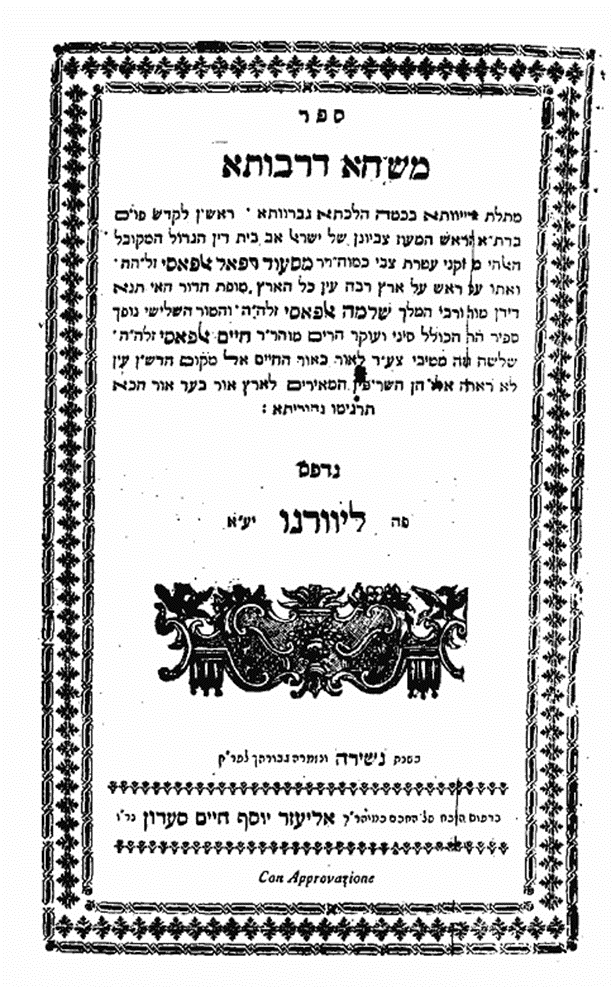
- Title page of "Mishḥa deRabuta"

Personal life
- Died: 1776
- Children: Solomon; Ḥayyim
- Occupation: rabbi
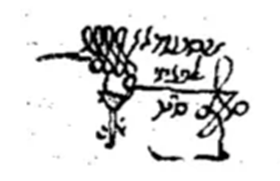
- Signature

Religious life
- Religion: Judaism

Jewish leader
- Main work: Mishḥa deRabuta
- Residence: Tunisia

Masa'ud Raphael Alfasi (died 1776) was a Tunisian rabbi.

== Mishḥa deRabuta ==
He is the author of "Mishḥa deRabuta" (Oil of Anointing), a work containing notes on all four sections of Rabbi Joseph Karo's "Shulchan Aruch" (Leghorn, 1805). He was assisted by his two learned sons, Solomon (died 1801) and Ḥayyim (died 1783), the former being the author of a similar work, "Kerub Mimshaḥ" (The Anointed Cherub), Leghorn, 1859.
