= L Special Brigade (Italy) =

- Active: 12 November 1942 - 5 May 1943
- Country: Kingdom of Italy
- Branch: Royal Italian Army
- Type: Infantry
- Size: Brigade
- Engagements: Tunisian campaign

Insignia
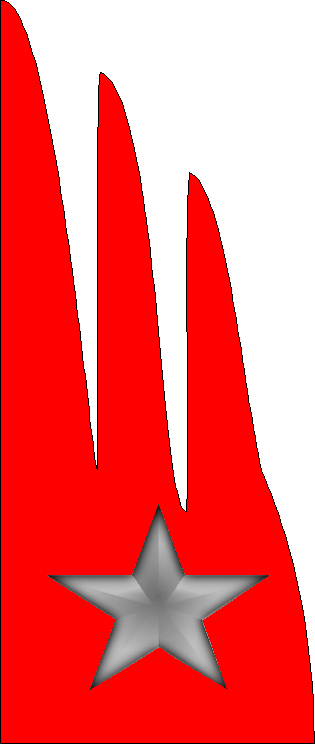
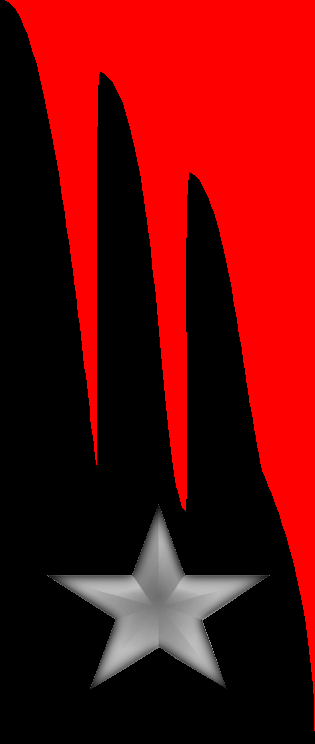
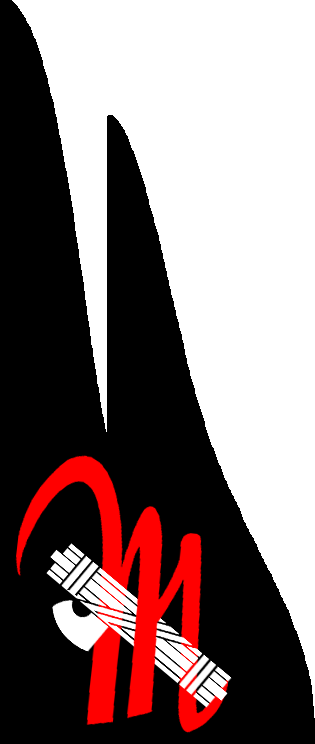
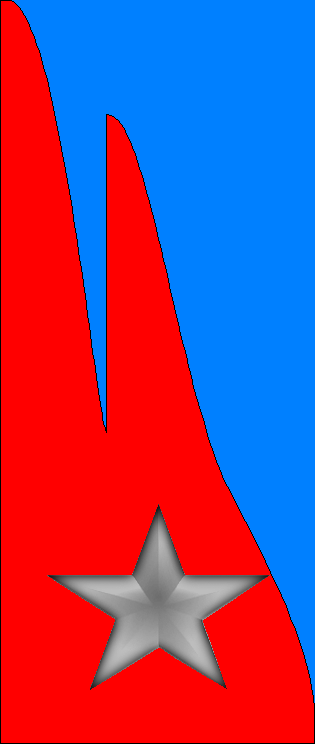
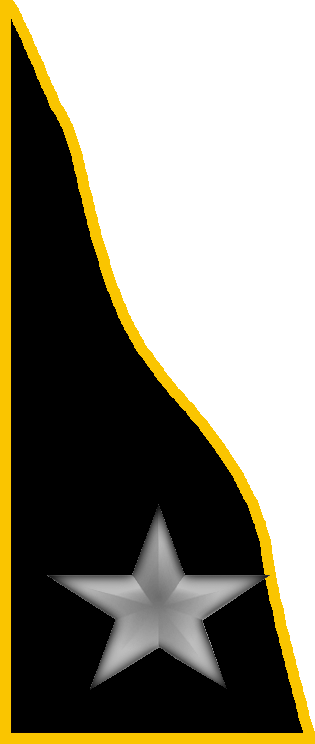
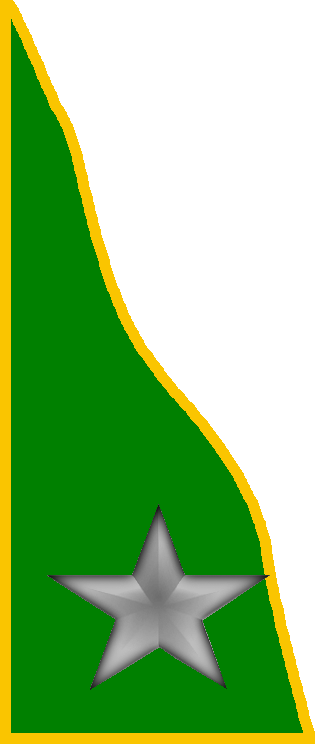
- Identification symbol: L Special Brigade gorget patches

The L Special Brigade (Italian: L Brigata Speciale) was an infantry brigade of the Royal Italian Army formed for the Tunisian campaign in World War II.

== History ==
On 8 November 1942 allied forces landed in Operation Torch in French Morocco and French Algeria, which put French Tunisia in reach of allied forces. Because of the nearness of Sicily to Tunisia and to protect the rear of the Panzer Army Africa, which was in retreat following the Second Battle of El Alamein the leaders of Germany and Italy Adolf Hitler and Benito Mussolini immediately dispatched forces to occupy Tunisia.

On 10 November 1942, the Run for Tunis commenced and the first German and Italian units arrived in Tunis and Bizerte. The L Special Brigade's command was activated on 12 November 1942 in Naples and flown to immediately to Tunisia, where it took command of the first Italian units to arrive.

While the bulk of the Axis forces moved westwards to counter advancing allies units, the L Special Brigade moved to the South of the country to secure the left flank of Panzer Army Africa's retreat route. On 20 November 1942 the brigade consisted of the following units:

- L Special Brigade
  - 1st Motorcyclists Company/ 10th Bersaglieri Regiment
  - 5th Company/ II Battalion/ 92nd Infantry Regiment/ 1st Infantry Division "Superga"
  - 6th Company/ II Battalion/ 92nd Infantry Regiment/ 1st Infantry Division "Superga"
  - 1st Battery/ I Group/ 5th Artillery Regiment/ 1st Infantry Division "Superga" (75/18 Mod. 35 howitzers)
  - 1x Anti-aircraft Section (20/65 Mod. 35 anti-aircraft guns)

On 21 November 1942 the brigade arrived in Sfax and placed small detachments of its units along a line, running 50-100 km inland in parallel to the coast between Sousse and Gabès. With the arrival of more units the brigade garrisoned Kairouan, Sbeitla, and Sened Station and began an intensive exploration of the area to determine the most likely routes of advances of allied forces. By 8 December 1942 the brigade was at full strength and returned the companies and battery of the 1st Infantry Division "Superga".

The first contact with allied forces occurred on 23 January 1943 to the West of Sfax. On 1-3 February 1943 the brigade retained control of Sened Station after a bitter battle against the American 168th Infantry Regiment.

On 20 March 1943 in preparation for the Battle of El Guettar the American 1st Armored Division attacked the positions of the brigade in strength and the brigade had to fall back to prepared positions at Meknassy. The American forces renewed their offensive from 23 March and the brigade had to fall back with other Axis forces to the last Axis line at Enfidaville. There the brigade was dissolved on 5 May 1943 to reinforce the remaining units of the Italian 1st Army.

== Organization ==
The brigade's major units after 8 December 1942 were:

- L Special Brigade
  - V CC.NN. Battalion
  - VI Machine Gun Squadrons Group, Regiment "Lancieri di Aosta"
  - Italian residents in Tunisia Volunteers Battalion (transferred to the Assault Grouping, 1st Infantry Division "Superga" in late December 1942)
  - Battalion "Grado", Marine Infantry Regiment "San Marco" (returned to the 1st Infantry Division "Superga" in late December 1942)
  - XV Tank Battalion "M" (M14/41 tanks; transferred from the 131st Armored Division "Centauro")
  - DLVII Self-propelled Group (Semovente da 75/18 self-propelled guns; transferred from the 131st Armored Division "Centauro")
  - LXXII Anti-aircraft Artillery Group (75/46 mod. 34 anti-aircraft guns)
  - 233rd Mixed Engineer Company
  - Transport Unit
  - Medical Section
  - Supply Section
  - Carabinieri Section

Attached to the brigade in 1943:

- Armored Reconnaissance Grouping "Cavalleggeri di Lodi" (from February 1943)
- LX Machine Gun Battalion
- XXXIII Guardia alla Frontiera Artillery Group (149/40 mod. 35 howitzers)

== Commanding officers ==
The division's commanding officer was:

- Generale di Brigata Giovanni Imperiali (12 November 1942 - 5 May 1943)
