= 5th Bersaglieri Regiment =

Inactive Italian Army infantry unit

- 5° Reggimento bersaglieri
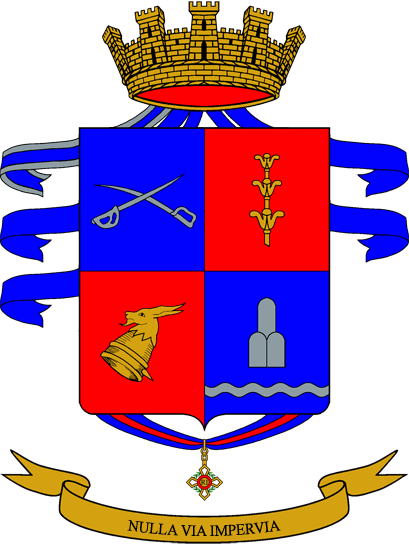
- Regimental coat of arms
- Active: 16 April 1861 - 13 May 1943; 15 April 1977 - 30 Dec. 1989
- Country: Italy
- Branch: Italian Army
- Part of: Armored Division "Ariete"
- Garrison/HQ: Albenga
- Motto: "Nulla via impervia"
- Anniversaries: 18 June 1836
- Decorations: 1x Military Order of Italy; 1x Silver Medal of Military Valor; 4x Bronze Medals of Military Valor

Insignia
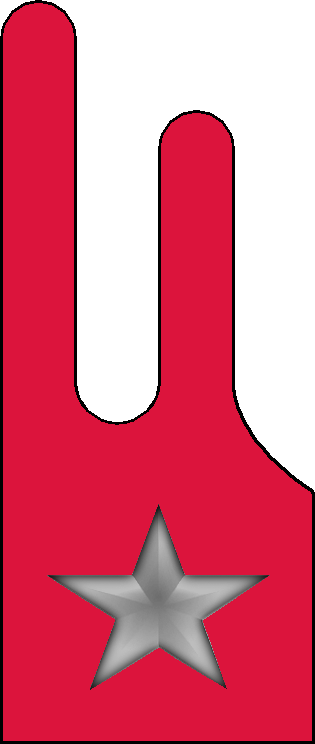
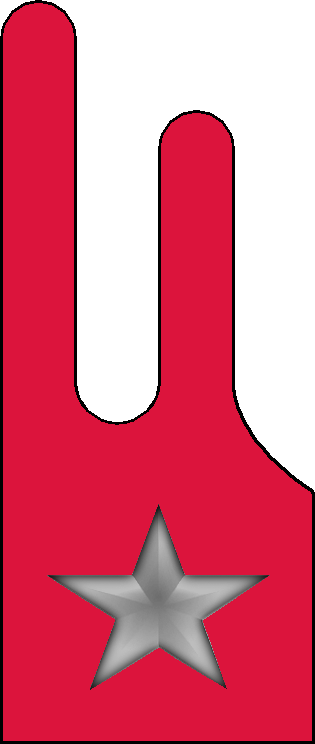
- Bersaglieri gorget patches

The 5th Bersaglieri Regiment (Italian: 5° Reggimento Bersaglieri) is an inactive unit of the Italian Army last based in Albenga in Liguria. The regiment is part of the Italian Army's infantry corps' Bersaglieri speciality and was last operationally assigned to the Armored Division "Ariete". The regiment was formed in 1861 by the Royal Italian Army with preexisting battalions. During World War I the regiment served on the Italian front.

During World War II the regiment was assigned to the 131st Armored Division "Centauro", with which it participated in the Greco-Italian War. In November 1942 the division was transferred to Libya for the Western Desert Campaign. After the Axis forces had retreated into Tunisia the division fought in thee Tunisian campaign, during which it was destroyed in May 1943. In 1977 the regiment's flag and traditions were assigned to the 14th Bersaglieri Battalion "Sernaglia", which was a recruits training unit of the Armored Division "Ariete". At the end of the Cold War the 14th Bersaglieri Battalion "Sernaglia" was disbanded on 30 December 1989 and the flag of the 5th Bersaglieri Regiment transferred to the Shrine of the Flags in the Vittoriano in Rome. The regiment's anniversary falls, as for all Bersaglieri units, on 18 June 1836, the day the Bersaglieri speciality was founded.

== History ==
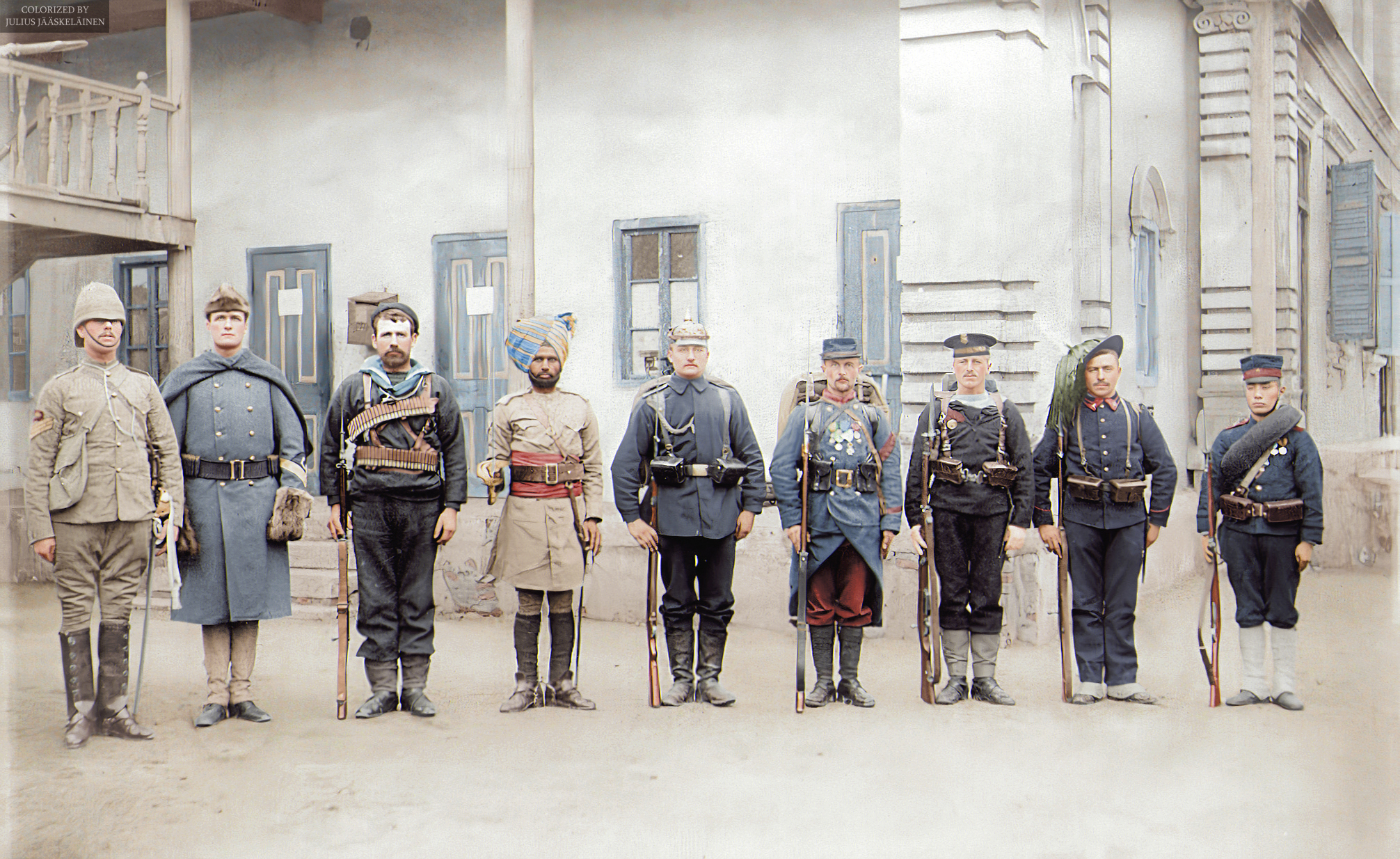
Second from right: Bersagliere in China during the Boxer Rebellion in 1901

On 16 April 1861 the 5th Army Corps Bersaglieri Command was formed in Cuneo and assigned to the V Army Corps. The command had purely administrative functions and consisted of the preexisting XIV, XVI, XXIV, and XXXIV battalions, and the V Bersaglieri Depot Battalion. Already 8 days later the command moved from Cuneo to Livorno. On 31 December 1861 the command was renamed 5th Bersaglieri Regiment, but continued to exert only administrative functions. In 1862 the regiment added the XXXV and XXXVI battalions. On 18 December 1864 the Bersaglieri regiments were reduced from six to five and consequently the 4th Bersaglieri Regiment was disbanded and its XXII Battalion transferred to the 5th Bersaglieri Regiment. In 1865 the regiment formed the XXXIX Battalion and now consisted of eight battalions. In 1866, in preparation for the Third Italian War of Independence, the regiment formed the XLV Battalion, and in August 1866, towards the end of the war, the regiment formed the L Battalion, which was disbanded in December 1866. The XLV Battalion was disbanded in December 1870.

On 1 January 1871 the 5th Bersaglieri Regiment was reorganized as an operational regiment with the XIV Battalion, XXII Battalion, XXIV Battalion, and XXXIX Battalion, while the XVI Battalion, XXXIV Battalion, XXXV Battalion, and XXXVI Battalion were transferred to the newly formed 10th Bersaglieri Regiment. The four remaining battalions were renumbered as I, II, III, and IV battalion. On 16 September 1883 the IV Battalion was disbanded. On 18 June 1886, all Bersaglieri battalions resumed their original numbering and afterwards the 5th Bersaglieri Regiment consisted of the XIV Battalion, XXII Battalion, and XXIV Battalion.

The XIV Battalion had been formed in 1859 and participated in the Sardinian campaign in central and southern Italy, during which the battalion distinguished itself in the Siege of Ancona and Siege of Gaeta. For the valor the battalion had shown in the two sieges it was awarded two Bronze Medals of Military Valor, which were affixed to the flag of the 5th Bersaglieri Regiment and added to the regiment's coat of arms, when the battalion joined the regiment. The XXII Battalion and XXIV Battalion were both formed in 1860 and both participated in the Sardinian campaign in central and southern Italy. During the campaign the XXIV Battalion distinguished itself in the Siege of Gaeta, for which it was awarded a Bronze Medal of Military Valor, which was affixed to the flag of the 5th Bersaglieri Regiment and added to the regiment's coat of arms, when the battalion joined the regiment.

In 1866 the battalions participated in the Third Italian War of Independence, during which the XXII Battalion fought in the Battle of Versa. In 1895-96 the regiment provided 17 officers and 451 troops to help form the I, II, IV, and V provisional battalions, which were deployed to Eritrea for the First Italo-Ethiopian War. In 1900-01 the regiment's 7th Company, along with companies of the 2nd Bersaglieri Regiment, 4th Bersaglieri Regiment, and 8th Bersaglieri Regiment, was assigned to a provisional Bersaglieri battalion, which served with the Eight-Nation Alliance in China during the Boxer Rebellion. On 1 October 1910 the regiment's depot in Bologna formed the V Cyclists Battalion. In 1911, the regiment provided 5 officers and 431 troops to augment units fighting in the Italo-Turkish War.

=== World War I ===
At the outbreak of World War I the regiment consisted of the XIV, XXII, and XXIV battalions and the V Cyclists Battalion, which operated as an autonomous unit throughout the war. In January 1915 the depot of the 5th Bersaglieri Regiment in San Remo formed the XLVI and XLVII battalions. On 15 February 1915, the regiment's XXII Battalion departed for Italian Libya and consequently the XLVI Battalion joined the regiment as XXII bis Battalion. The XLVII Battalion, which was activated on 1 February 1915, operated as an autonomous unit throughout the war. In December 1915 the XXII bis Battalion resumed to be numbered XLVI Battalion. On 24 May 1915, the day after Italy's entry into the war, the regiment, together with the Brigade "Bergamo", operated in the Tolmin sector on the Isonzo river, where the two units were tasked with taking the Austrian positions on the hills of Bučenica and Mengore on the right bank of the Isonzo river. In November 1915, during the Third Battle of the Isonzo and Fourth Battle of the Isonzo the regiment was deployed on Monte Mrzli.

From February to April 1916 the regiment fought in the area of Dolje, Monte Mrzli, and Monte Vodil. On 15 May 1916, Austro-Hungary commenced the Battle of Asiago. Four days later the regiment was transferred as reinforcements to the Asiago plateau. On the Asiago plateau the regiment fought on Monte Lemerle, at Magnaboschi and at Kaberlaba. In August 1916, the regiment was again transferred to the Karst plateau for the Sixth Battle of the Isonzo. In September 1916, the regiment fought in the Seventh Battle of the Isonzo at Nova Vas and Jamiano. During the same battle the regiment's V Cyclists Battalion took Hill 144 on the Karst plateau East of Monfalcone. For taking Hill 144 the battalion was awarded a Silver Medal of Military Valor, which was affixed to the flag of the 5th Bersaglieri Regiment and added to the regiment's coat of arms.

In November 1917, after the disastrous Battle of Caporetto, the Italian armies had to fall back to Piave river front and the regiment was once more sent to the Asiago plateau, where it fought in November and December in the First Battle of Monte Grappa. For its conduct during this battle, especially for retaking Monte Melago on 24-25 December 1915, the regiment was awarded a Bronze Medal of Military Valor, which was affixed regiment's flag and added to the regiment's coat of arms. On 18 November 1917, the XLVII Battalion, which had suffered heavy casualties during the retreat to the Piave was disbanded and its remaining personnel assigned to the 19th Bersaglieri Regiment.

On 1 March 1918, the V Bersaglieri Brigade was reformed with the 5th Bersaglieri Regiment and 19th Bersaglieri Regiment. Originally the brigade consisted of the 4th Bersaglieri Regiment and 21st Bersaglieri Regiment, which both were disbanded at the end of the 1917 due to the losses the two regiments had suffered in the Battle of Caporetto. In June 1918, the V Bersaglieri Brigade fought in the Second Battle of the Piave River on Monte Valbella on the Asiago plateau. In October 1917 the brigade fought in the Battle of Vittorio Veneto, during which the 5th Bersaglieri Regiment managed to cross the Piave river and break the Austro-Hungarian Army's front at Sernaglia after five days of brutal combat.

=== Interwar years ===
After World War I the Royal Italian Army reduced its forces and in 1919 the V Cyclists Battalion was disbanded. The same year the regiment moved to the newly annexed city of Trieste. In May 1920, the regiment moved from Trieste to Mantua, where the XLVI Battalion was disbanded. Already in July of the same year the regimental command and XXIV Battalion returned to the armistice line on Italy's new Eastern border with the newly formed state of Yugoslavia. There the regiment temporarily received the VIII Battalion from the 7th Bersaglieri Regiment and XII Battalion from the 8th Bersaglieri Regiment. Together with the 11th Bersaglieri Regiment the regiment patrolled the armistice line until 5 February 1921, when the two battalions returned to their respective regiments, and the 5th Bersaglieri Regiment moved to Imperia. In 1922 the XXIV Battalion was reduced to a reserve unit. Already on 23 April 1923 the XXIV Battalion was reformed as an active unit. In July 1924 the regiment became a cyclists unit and the XXIV Battalion was renumbered as XXII Battalion. By 1926 the regiment consisted of the XIV and XXII battalions, and a depot.

In 1927 the regiment moved from Imperia to Siena. In 1935-36, 51 troops of the regiment were assigned to the 3rd Bersaglieri Regiment for the Second Italo-Ethiopian War. On 19 March 1936 the regiment was reorganized as a motorized unit and now consisted of the XIV Motorcycle Machine Gunners Battalion and the XXII Auto-transported Battalion. On 1 June 1936 the regiment was assigned to the I Motor-mechanized Brigade. On 12 October 1936 the regiment received the XXXI Assault Tanks Battalion "Cerboni" from the 3rd Tank Infantry Regiment. On 15 July 1937, the 31st Tank Infantry Regiment was formed in Siena and the 5th Bersaglieri Regiment transferred the XXXI Assault Tanks Battalion "Cerboni" to the new regiment. On the same date the I Motor-mechanized Brigade was renamed I Armored Brigade. On the same date, the 5th Bersaglieri Regiment was reorganized and then consisted of the following units:

- 5th Bersaglieri Regiment
  - Command Company
  - XIV Auto-transported Battalion
  - XXII Auto-transported Battalion
  - 5th Motorcyclists Company
  - 2× Cannons Companies, with 47/32 mod. 35 anti-tank guns
  - Auto Unit

On 20 April 1939 the 131st Armored Artillery Regiment was formed in Cremona and assigned to the I Armored Brigade, which on that date was renamed 131st Armored Division "Centauro". The same year the regiment reformed the XXIV Auto-transported Battalion, while the XII was reorganized as a motorcyclists unit. On 7 April 1939 the regimental command and XIV Battalion participated in the Invasion of Albania. The XIV Battalion remained in Albania on occupation duty.

=== World War II ===
In summer 1940 the 131st Armored Division "Centauro" was transferred to Albania for the upcoming Italian attack on Greece, which commenced on 28 October 1940. The division then fought in the Greco-Italian War in the Epirus sector. In January 1941, the division unsuccessfully tried to stop the Greek counteroffensive in the Battle of Klisura Pass. On 4 February 1941 the division was taken out of the line due to the heavy losses it had suffered. While the 5th Bersaglieri Regiment was being rebuilt the 1st Bersaglieri Regiment replaced it in the 131st Armored Division "Centauro". At the same time the 5th Bersaglieri Regiment received temporarily the XVII Battalion from the 2nd Bersaglieri Regiment as reinforcements. In April 1941, the division participated in the Invasion of Yugoslavia. On 11 May 1941 the division began the return transfer to its bases in Tuscany. On 31 July 1941 the 5th Bersaglieri Regiment returned to the division and relieved the 1st Bersaglieri Regiment.

On 1 September 1941 the 5th Bersaglieri Regiment was reorganized and consisted of the following units:

- 5th Bersaglieri Regiment
  - Command Company
  - XIV Auto-transported Battalion
    - Command Company
    - 2× Bersaglieri companies
    - Cannons Company, with 47/32 mod. 35 anti-tank guns
  - XXII Support Weapons Battalion
    - Command Company
    - Machine Gunners Company
    - Anti-aircraft Company, with 20/65 mod. 35 anti-aircraft guns
    - Mortar Company, with 81mm mod. 35 mortars
  - XXIV Auto-transported Battalion
    - Command Company
    - 2× Bersaglieri companies
    - Cannons Company, with 47/32 mod. 35 anti-tank guns
  - Motorcyclists Company

On 1 February 1942, the regimental depot of the 5th Bersaglieri Regiment in Siena reformed the 18th Bersaglieri Regiment as an armored reconnaissance regiment. In November 1942 the regimental command, together with the XIV and XXII battalions, was airlifted to Libya for the Western Desert Campaign. At the same time the XXIV Battalion was shipped to Tunisia for the Run for Tunis. In early January 1943 the entire regiment assembled in Ghannouch in Southern Tunisia, where it was soon joined by the rest of the Centauro. Over the next months the division participated in the Tunisian campaign and fought in the battles of Kasserine Pass, Mareth Line, and El Guettar. On 13 May 1943, Axis forces in Tunisia surrendered and the 5th Bersaglieri Regiment was declared lost due to wartime events.

=== Cold War ===
During the 1975 army reform the army disbanded the regimental level and newly independent battalions were granted for the first time their own flags. On 15 April 1977, the three detached recruits training companies in Albenga of the 16th Infantry Battalion "Savona" became an autonomous battalion, which was renamed 14th Bersaglieri Battalion "Sernaglia". The battalion was named for Sernaglia, where the 5th Bersaglieri Regiment had fought during the Battle of Vittorio Veneto. The battalion was assigned to the Armored Division "Ariete" and consisted of a command, a command platoon, and three recruits training companies. Already on 14 March 1977 the President of the Italian Republic Giovanni Leone had issued decree 173, which assigned the flag and traditions of the 5th Bersaglieri Regiment to the battalion.

In 1986 the Italian Army abolished the divisional level. Consequently the Armored Division "Ariete" was disbanded on 1 October 1986 and the battalion was transferred to the Northwestern Military Region. With the end of the Cold War the Italian Army began to draw down its forces and on 30 December 1989 the 14th Bersaglieri Battalion "Sernaglia" was disbanded, while the flag of the 5th Bersaglieri Regiment had already been transferred to the Shrine of the Flags in the Vittoriano in Rome ten days earlier on 20 December 1989.

== See also ==
- Bersaglieri
