= Arturo Scattini =

Italian general

- Born: 11 July 1890; Bergamo, Kingdom of Italy
- Died: 16 October 1970 (aged 80); Rome, Italy
- Military career
- Allegiance: Kingdom of Italy; Italy
- Branch: Royal Italian Army; Italian Army
- Rank: Lieutenant General
- Commands: 7th Libyan Regiment; 9th Bersaglieri Regiment; 80th Infantry Division "La Spezia" "Friuli" Combat Group; 8th Territorial Defence Command; 9th Territorial Defence Command
- Conflicts: World War I; First Battle of Monte Grappa; Second Battle of Monte Grappa; Italian invasion of Albania; World War II; Greco-Italian War; Axis invasion of Yugoslavia; Tunisian campaign; Italian campaign; Battle of the Gothic Line; Spring 1945 offensive in Italy; Battle of Bologna
- Awards: Silver Medal of Military Valor; Bronze Medal of Military Valor (twice); Military Order of Savoy; Order of Merit of the Italian Republic

Arturo Scattini (Bergamo, 11 July 1890 – Rome, 16 October 1970) was an Italian general during World War II.

== Biography ==
During the First World War he fought with the rank of captain in the 59th Infantry Division, earning two Bronze Medals of Military Valor for his conduct during the First and Second Battle of Monte Grappa. In 1933 he assumed command of the 7th Libyan Regiment, and in 1937 (with the rank of colonel) that of the 9th Bersaglieri Regiment, which he held until November 1939. In April 1939, in command of the 9th Bersaglieri Regiment, he participated in the Italian invasion of Albania, receiving a Silver Medal of Military Valor for the capture of Shkoder.

From November 1939 to January 1940 he was attached to the Army Corps of Treviso, after which he was transferred to the Ministry of War. From October 1940 to July 1941 he was head of the Information Office of the Albania General Headquarters, receiving the Military Order of Savoy for his work during the Greco-Italian War and the Axis invasion of Yugoslavia. He was promoted to brigadier general on 1 January 1942, and on 1 June of the same year he was appointed deputy commander of the 80th Infantry Division La Spezia, fighting in Tunisia; on 29 March 1943 he assumed command of the Division following the death of his predecessor, General Gavino Pizzolato. He was captured by the British in May 1943, with the final surrender of all Axis forces in Tunisia, and held in the United Kingdom as a prisoner of war.

He was released in 1944, following the Armistice of Cassibile, and rejoined the Italian Co-belligerent Army, where he was given command of the "Friuli" Combat Group. On 8 February 1945 the Combat Group was sent to replace the 5th Kresowa Infantry Division on the Gothic Line, in the Brisighella sector, holding the front on the Senio river. The combat group participated in the 1945 spring offensive, liberating Riolo dei Bagni on 11 April 1945 and then advancing towards Castel Bolognese and Imola along the Via Emilia, together with the Polish Carpathian Division. After bitter fighting against the Germans in Casalecchio dei Conti, on the morning of April 21, Scattini and his 87th Infantry Regiment "Friuli" were among the first Allied units to enter Bologna.

After the end of the war, Scattini became Inspector-General of Infantry of the postwar Italian Army in 1949, and commander of the 8th and later the 9th Territorial Defence Command. In 1952 he was awarded the Order of Merit of the Italian Republic. After retiring, he became honorary president of the National Bersaglieri Association. He was the father of film director Luigi Scattini and grandfather of actress Monica Scattini.
