= Operation Supercharge =

Operation Supercharge may refer to:

- Operation Supercharge (1941), the second of three operations to relieve the Australian 9th Division during the siege of Tobruk
- Operation Supercharge (1942), an attack during the Second Battle of El Alamein that broke through Axis defensive lines
- Operation Supercharge II, an outflanking maneuver at the Tebaga Gap in the Tunisian Campaign
