= 80th Infantry Division "La Spezia" =

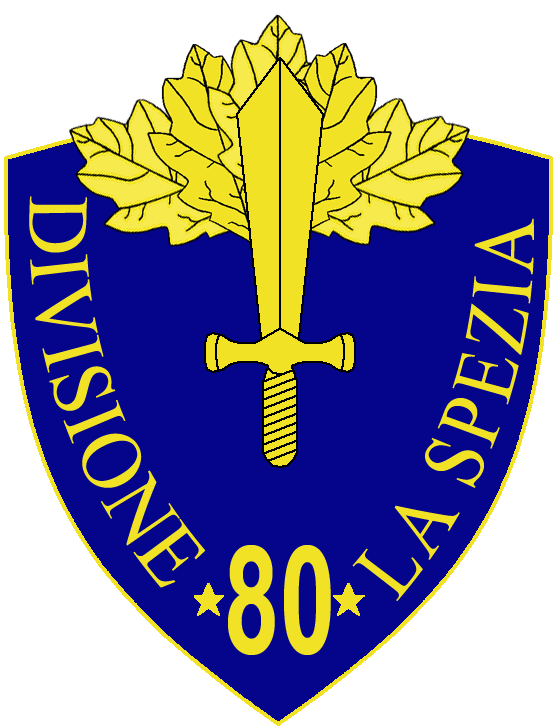
- 80th Infantry Division "La Spezia" insignia
- Active: 1941–1943
- Country: Kingdom of Italy
- Branch: Royal Italian Army
- Role: Airlanding
- Size: Division
- Part of: XXI Army Corps
- Garrison/HQ: Pisa
- Engagements: World War II

Insignia
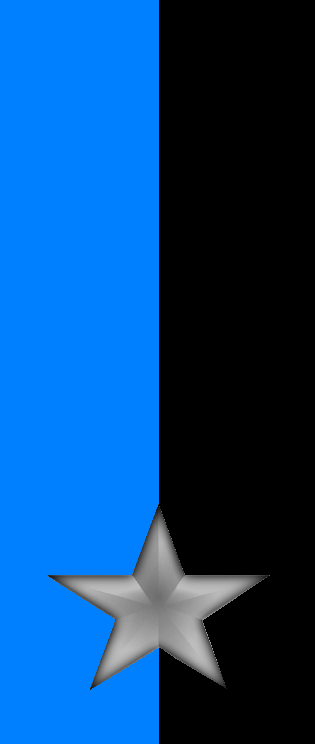
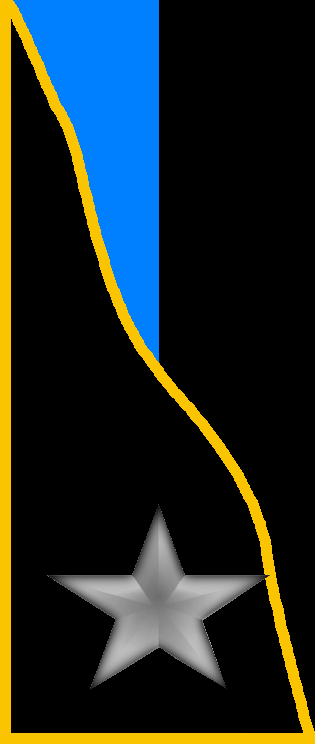
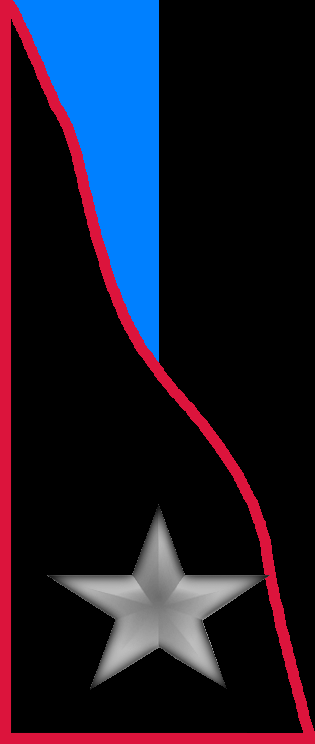
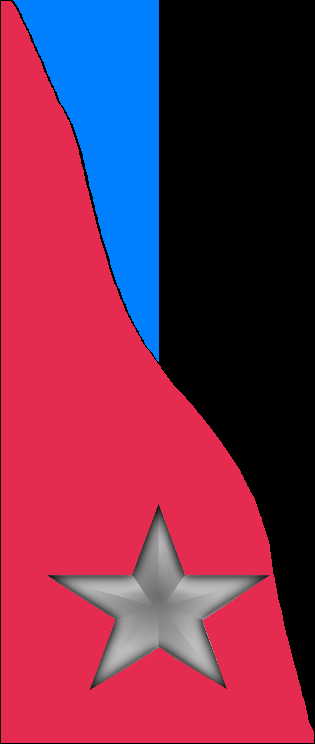
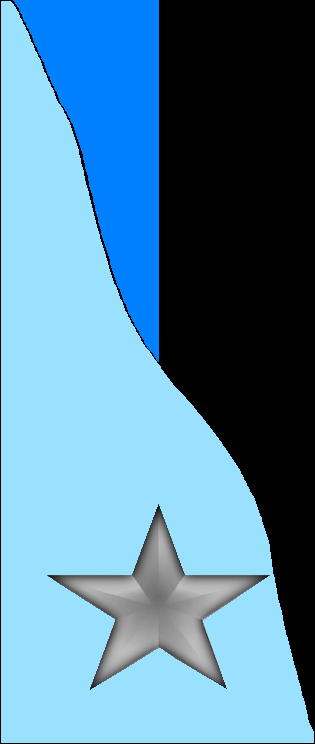
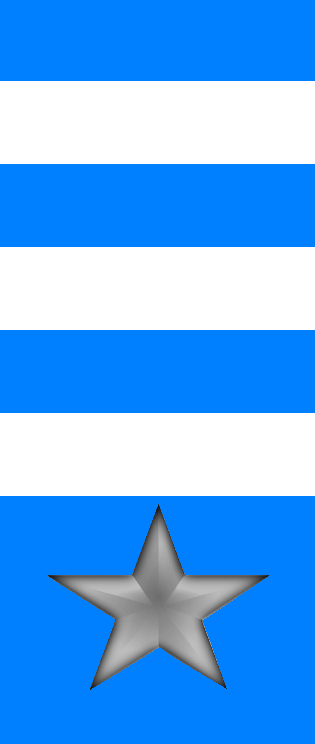
- Identification symbol: La Spezia Division gorget patches

80th Infantry Division "La Spezia" (Italian: 80ª Divisione di fanteria "La Spezia") was an infantry division of the Royal Italian Army during World War II. The La Spezia was formed on 15 November 1941 and named for the city of La Spezia. The La Spezia division was the only air-transportable division of the army and earmarked for the planned invasion of Malta. In November 1942 the division was sent to Libya to participate in the North African Campaign. On 13 May 1943 the La Spezia surrendered to Allied forces in Tunisia.

== History ==
=== World War I ===
The division's lineage begins with the Brigade "Spezia" raised on 1 March 1915 with the 125th and 126th infantry regiments. The brigade fought on the Italian front in World War I and together with its regiments was disbanded on 29 November 1917 after having been destroyed in the Battle of Caporetto. The brigade and its two regiments were raised again in Macedonia on 15 October 1918, but before the brigade could enter the Macedonian front the war ended. After the war the brigade and its regiments were disbanded in June 1919.

=== World War II ===
The 80th Infantry Division "La Spezia" was activated in Pisa on 15 November 1941 and consisted of the 125th and 126th infantry regiments, and the 80th Artillery Regiment. As a division raised during the war the La Spezia did not have its own regimental depots and therefore its regiments were raised by the depots of the 20th Infantry Division "Friuli" and 44th Infantry Division "Cremona": the 125th Infantry Regiment "La Spezia" was raised in Livorno on 5 November 1941 by the 88th Infantry Regiment "Friuli" and the 126th Infantry Regiment "La Spezia" was raised in Pisa on 5 November 1941 by the 22nd Infantry Regiment "Cremona", while the 80th Artillery Regiment "La Spezia" was raised in Pisa by the 7th Artillery Regiment "Cremona".

The division was earmarked for the planned invasion of Malta and moved in June 1942 to Apulia in Southern Italy to be near the air bases from which it would depart for Malta. After the operation was canceled the division was flown from 1 October 1942 to Libya, where it deployed to Brega ed El Agheila by early November. After the Second Battle of El Alamein Axis forces, including the La Spezia, were driven westwards by the victorious British Eighth Army. The La Spezia retreated to Tarhuna-Al-Khums on 2–14 January 1943, to Tripoli-Zawiya on 15–19 January 1943, and finally to the Mareth Line in Tunisia between 20 January and 4 February 1943.

On 23 February the German-Italian units on the Mareth Line entered the Italian 1st Army. On 6 March 1943 the La Spezia participated in the Battle of Medenine, and ten days later in the Battle of the Mareth Line. During the latter battle the division lost half of its strength and on 25 March the division retreated together with the other Axis forces to the prepared defensive position at Wadi Akarit. On 6–7 April 1943 the British Eighth Army broke through the Axis line in the Battle of Wadi Akarit and the Italian 1st Army was forced to withdraw Enfidaville.

While the British Eighth Army and Italian 1st Army at Enfidaville remained static, to their North Allied forces overran German and Italian defenses and took Bizerte and Tunis. By 12 May 1943 the remaining 80,000 men of the Italian 1st Army were surrounded and the next day its commanding officer General Giovanni Messe surrendered his army to British General Bernard Freyberg. The La Spezia was officially declared lost on the 13 May 1943.

== Organization ==
80th Infantry Division "La Spezia" organization

- 80th Infantry Division "La Spezia", in Pisa
  - Headquarters
    - Command Company
    - 80th Carabinieri Section
    - 115th Carabinieri Section
    - 115th Field Post Office
  - 125th Infantry Regiment "La Spezia"
    - Command Company
    - 3 × Fusilier battalions
    - Cannons Company (47/32 mod. 35 anti-tank guns)
    - Mortar Company (81mm mod. 35 mortars)
  - 126th Infantry Regiment "La Spezia"
    - Command Company
    - 3 × Fusilier battalions
    - Cannons Company (47/32 mod. 35 anti-tank guns)
    - Mortar Company (81mm mod. 35 mortars)
  - 80th Artillery Regiment "La Spezia" (until December 1942)
    - Command Unit
    - I Group (65/17 mod. 13 mountain guns)
    - II Group (65/17 mod. 13 mountain guns)
    - III Group (65/17 mod. 13 mountain guns)
    - 7th Anti-aircraft Battery (20/65 mod. 35 anti-aircraft guns)
    - 8th Anti-aircraft Battery (20/65 mod. 35 anti-aircraft guns)
    - Ammunition and Supply Unit
  - 80th Artillery Regiment "La Spezia" (January to May 1943)
    - Command Unit
    - 1 × Group (100/17 mod. 14 howitzers)
    - 1 × Group (75/46 mod. 34 anti-aircraft guns)
    - 1 × Group (77/28 field guns)
    - 1 × Group (75/27 mod. 06)
    - 1 × Battery (65/17 mod. 13 mountain guns)
    - 1 × Anti-aircraft Battery (20/65 mod. 35 anti-aircraft guns)
    - Ammunition and Supply Unit
  - XXXIX Reconnaissance Battalion (AB 41 armored cars)
  - LXXX Anti-tank Battalion (47/32 mod. 35 anti-tank guns)
  - LXXX Mixed Engineer Battalion
    - 80th Telegraph and Radio Operators Company
    - 1 × Engineer Company
  - 80th Medical Section
    - 2 × Field hospitals
    - 1 × Surgical unit
  - 180th Supply Section

Attached to the division during the Tunisian campaign:

- Battalion "San Marco" (Royal Italian Navy; attached in December 1942)
- VI Libyan CC.NN. Battalion (attached from December 1942 to March 1943)
- Infantry Battalion "Tobruk" (from March 1943)
- CVI Anti-tank Battalion (from March 1943)
- CCLII Mortar Battalion (from March 1943)
- CCLXXXI Guardia alla Frontiera Machine Gun Battalion (from March 1943)

== Commanding officers ==
The division's commanding officers were:

- Generale di Divisione Quirino Armellini (15 November 1941 - 31 January 1942)
- Generale di Brigata Alessandro Maccario (1 February 1942 - 15 May 1942)
- Generale di Divisione Gavino Pizzolato (16 May 1942 - 27 March 1943, KIA)
- Generale di Brigata Arturo Scattini (29 March 1943 - 13 May 1943, POW)
