= Tebaga Gap =

The Tebaga Gap is east of the Chotts Salt pans, south of Gabès, and west-south-west of Mareth and WNW of Medenine (Pass location is roughly at the 'M' of Mareth).

The Tebaga Gap of southern Tunisia is a low mountain pass located in rough rocky broken country giving entry to the inhabited coastal plain to the north and east from much less hospitable desert dominated terrain in southern and south-western Tunisia.

The pass separates the Matmata hills to the east running roughly north to south from the Djebel Tebaga hills, another line of high ground to the west of the gap running east–west. The terrain of the region about the pass was of great tactical importance during the Second World War in 1939–1940 and in 1943.

North and west of this region is the great salt lake known as the Chott el Djerid or Chotts. West of the Matmata Hills, the terrain is dry country, the Jebel Dahar, and then impassable sand of the Grand Erg Oriental. The oasis town of Gabès lies on the coast where the plain meets the route from the Tebaga Gap. North of Gabès, the road to Sfax, an ancient caravan route to Libya and points east, passes between the sea and the Chotts and this was Montgomery's only route north, a way blocked by the Mareth Line. Many buildings in the region are subterranean because of the harsh desert temperature changes and lack of moisture.

== See also ==
- Matmata — town sharing its name with the nearby hills.
- North African Campaign
  - Tunisia Campaign
  - Operation Torch
  - Operation Pugilist
