= Paolo Berardi =

Italian general

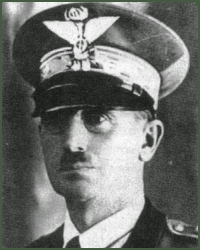

Chief of Staff of the Royal Italian Army
- In office 18 November 1943 – 10 February 1945
- Preceded by: Mario Roatta
- Succeeded by: Ercole Ronco

Personal details
- Born: 21 June 1885 Turin, Kingdom of Italy
- Died: 13 December 1953 (aged 68) Turin, Italy
- Awards: Silver Medal of Military Valour; Bronze Medal of Military Valour (twice); War Cross of Military Valor (twice)

Military service
- Allegiance: Kingdom of Italy
- Branch/service: Royal Italian Army
- Years of service: 1908–1948
- Rank: General
- Commands: 20th Artillery Regiment; 2nd Alpine Group; 11th Infantry Division Brennero; 12th Infantry Division Sassari; XXI Corps; Chief of Staff of the Army; Military Command of Sicily
- Battles/wars: Italo-Turkish War; World War I; World War II; Battle of the Western Alps; Greco-Italian War; Battle of the Mareth Line; Battle of Wadi Akarit

Paolo Berardi (21 June 1885 – 13 December 1953) was an Italian general who served in the Italo-Turkish War, World War I, and World War II. He was Chief of Staff of the Italian Co-Belligerent Army from November 1943 to February 1945.

== Biography ==
A career officer, in 1912 he participated in the Italo-Turkish War with the rank of lieutenant, receiving a Bronze Medal of Military Valour for the occupation of Sidi Said in Libya. He participated in the First World War as an artillery captain and was awarded another Bronze Medal of Military Valour and two War Crosses. In 1926 he was promoted to lieutenant colonel and in 1932 to colonel, in command of the 20th Artillery Regiment. He was appointed brigadier general in 1937.

At the outbreak of World War II he became commander of the 2nd Alpine Group in the Battle of the Western Alps. In September 1940 he was given command of the 11th Infantry Division Brennero, which he led during the Greco-Italian War. In September 1941 he was promoted to major general and became chief of staff of the Seventh Army. In 1942 he was commander of the 12th Infantry Division Sassari in Yugoslavia; he was later included in a list of war criminals wanted by the Allies for crimes committed by his troops in Yugoslavia (CROWCASS). In January 1943 he was promoted to lieutenant general and sent to Tunisia, where he commanded the XXI Corps. For his part in the battles of the Mareth Line and Wadi Akarit he was awarded a Silver Medal of Military Valour. He was wounded and captured by the British on 12 May 1943, being then sent to England as a prisoner of war.

After the Armistice of Cassibile he was released, along with Giovanni Messe and Taddeo Orlando, to serve the new Allied-aligned Badoglio Government. On 18 November 1943 Marshal Pietro Badoglio appointed him Chief of Staff of what remained of the Royal Italian Army, now fighting alongside the Allies; he tried to involve as many Italian units as possible in the war against Nazi Germany and the Italian Social Republic, with the establishment of the Italian Co-belligerent Army and the Italian Liberation Corps. He remained in that position until 10 February 1945, when he was appointed military commander of Sicily with headquarters in Palermo, a post he held until 1946. He retired from the Army in 1948.

His memoirs (Memorie di un capo di stato maggiore dell'esercito: 1943-1945) were published posthumously in 1954.
