= Battle of the Mareth Line =

Battle of World War II fought in Tunisia

- Part of the Tunisian campaign of the Second World War
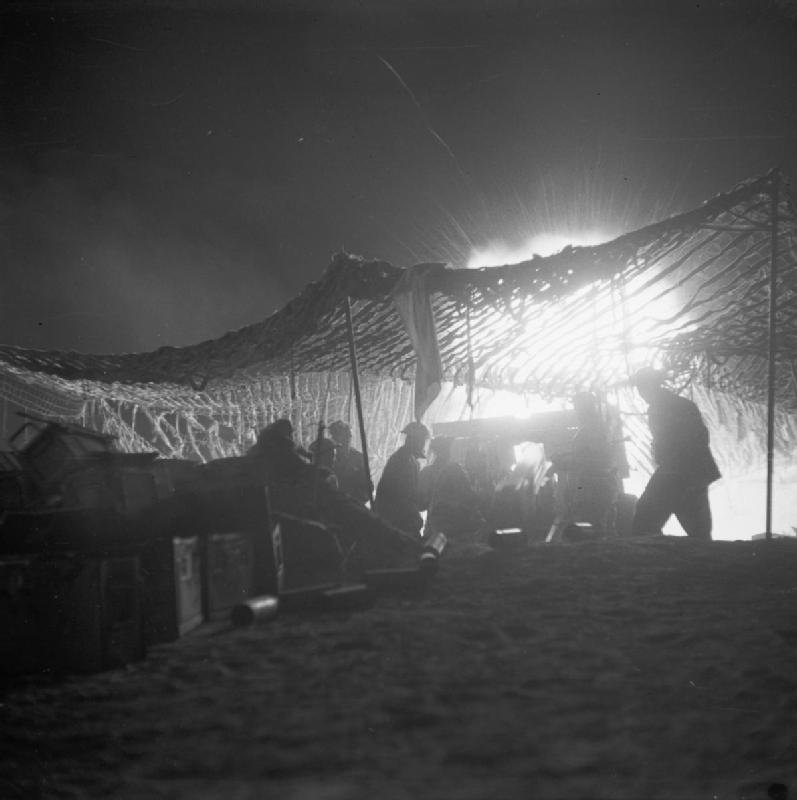
- A British 25-pounder field gun in action at night, during the assault on the Mareth Line
Date	16–31 March 1943
Location	Southern Tunisia 33°38′N 10°18′E
Result	British victory

Belligerents
United Kingdom: British India; New Zealand; Free France (Kingdom of Greece) Greece	Italy; Germany

Commanders and leaders
Bernard Montgomery; Oliver Leese; Bernard Freyberg; Brian Horrocks; Philippe Leclerc	(Kingdom of Italy) Giovanni Messe (Kingdom of Italy) Taddeo Orlando (Kingdom of Italy) Paolo Berardi

Units involved
(United Kingdom) Eighth Army	(Kingdom of Italy) 1st Army

Strength
90,000 of 123,690 men 623 tanks	73,500 of 115,000 men 455 guns 139–220 tanks 480 anti-tank guns 75 × 88 mm guns

Casualties and losses
4,000	7,000 (POW)

The Battle of the Mareth Line or the Battle of Mareth was an attack in the Second World War by the British Eighth Army (General Bernard Montgomery) in Tunisia, against the Mareth Line held by the Italo–German 1st Army (General Giovanni Messe). It was the first big operation by the Eighth Army since the Second Battle of El Alamein 4 1/2 months earlier. On 19 March 1943, Operation Pugilist, the first British attack, established a bridgehead but a break-out attempt was defeated by Axis counter-attacks. Pugilist established an alternative route of attack and Operation Supercharge II, an outflanking manoeuvre via the Tebaga Gap was planned. Montgomery reinforced the flanking attack, which from 26 to 31 March, forced the 1st Army to retreat to Wadi Akarit, another 40 mi (64 km) back in Tunisia.

== Background ==
=== Axis retreat from El Alamein ===
The retreat of Panzer Army Africa (known as the Deutsch-Italienische Panzerarmee/Armata Corazzata Italo-Tedesca from October 1942) took place from 5 November 1942 to 15 February 1943. (Note: On 23 February 1943 the name of the Panzerarmee was changed for the last time, to 1st Italian Army (General Giovanni Messe). For the first time, German units came under Italian command, albeit with a German "liaison" officer, Major-General Fritz Bayerlein.) On 8 November, Operation Torch began in Morocco, Algeria and Tunisia, as the Panzerarmee Afrika in Egypt managed to evade British outflanking moves but traffic jams, fuel shortages, poor weather and air attacks reduced the speed of their retreat to 6–7 mi (9.7–11.3 km) per day. Comando Supremo in Rome and OKW in Berlin took an optimistic view of the situation and Comando Supremo chose the Mersa-el-Brega–El Agheila position as the terminus of the retreat, even though the position had a front of 110 mi (180 km) and its strongpoints were up to 5 mi (8.0 km) apart, too far for mutual support and only 30,000 mines. When the Panzerarmee arrived, the Afrika Korps had only 5,000 men, 35 tanks, 16 armoured cars, 12 anti-tank guns, 12 field howitzers and only 50 long tons (51 t) of the 400 long tons (410 t) of supplies it needed daily.

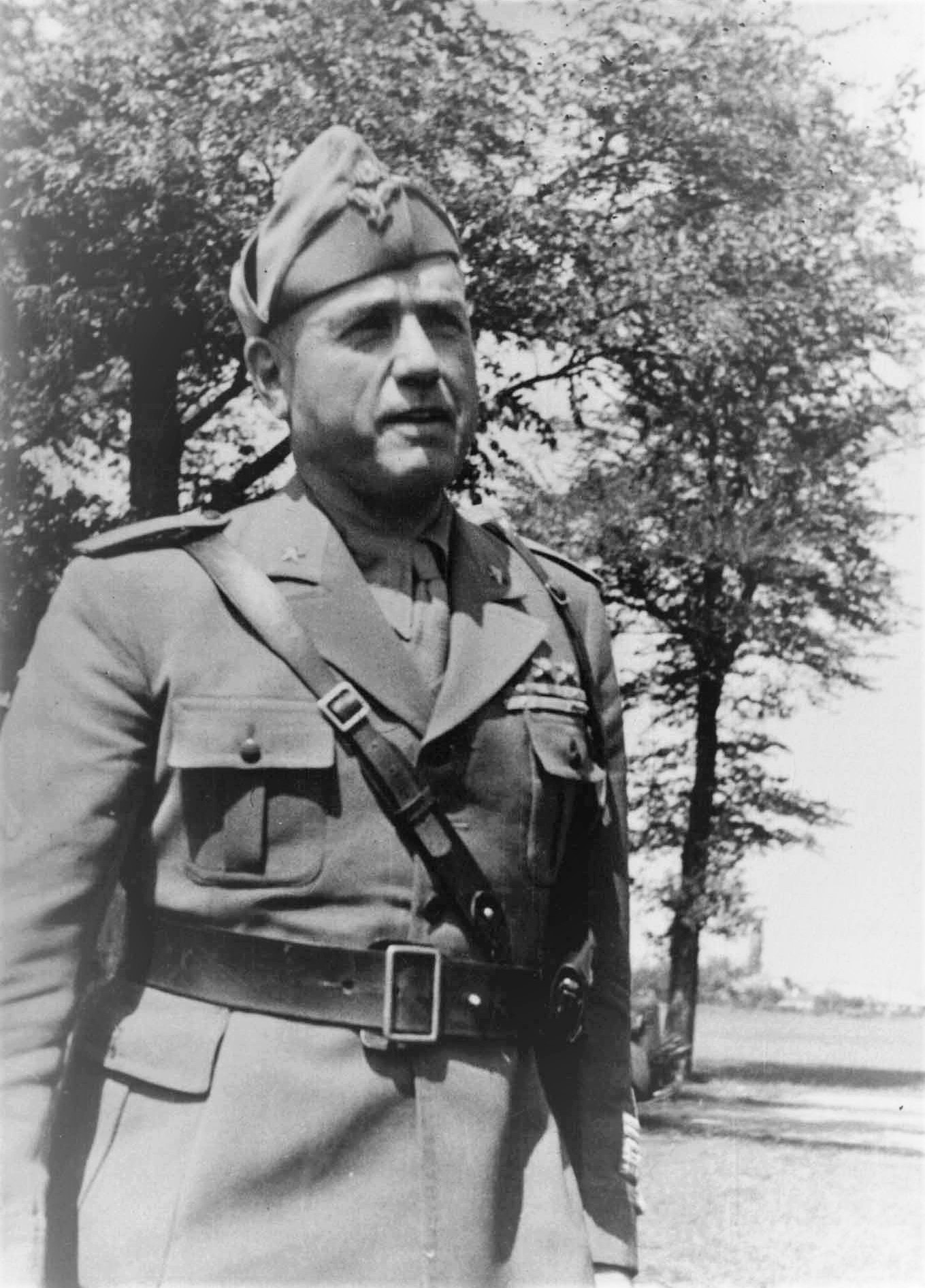
General Giovanni Messe

Rommel wanted to retreat to Wadi Akarit in the Gabès area, 120 mi (190 km) further west, where the non-motorised troops could defend a narrow gap between the Mediterranean and the Chott Djerid. The tanks and motorised infantry would join the 5th Panzer Army (Colonel-General Hans-Jürgen von Arnim) further north, drive back the British First Army from Tunisia into Algeria, then swiftly return to force back the Eighth Army. At a meeting with Hitler on 28 November, Rommel discussed the proposal but received only a promise of more supplies. On the night of 11/12 December, the British attacked and on the following evening, the Panzerarmee resumed its retreat, and despite its chronic fuel shortage, evaded another outflanking move. The Panzerarmee took up a defensive position at Buerat on 29 December but it was poorly fortified, wide open to an outflanking manoeuvre and vulnerable to an attack on Gabès by the First Army in southern Tunisia. The supply situation was a little better, with 152 long tons (154 t) tons of the 400 long tons (410 t) required daily, but 95 per cent of the fuel had been used distributing supplies or in retreat.

The Long Range Desert Group (LRDG) attacked Axis supply lines and hundreds of lorries were stranded along the roads for lack of fuel, while the Eighth Army amassed fuel and ammunition for its next attack. On 13 January 1943, the infantry of the 21st Panzer Division were sent north to the 5th Panzer Army to protect Gabès. On 15 January, the Eighth Army attacked with 450 tanks against 36 German and 57 Italian tanks. That evening Rommel ordered another retreat; lack of fuel and apprehension about the threat to Gabès, led the retreating infantry to pass beyond the Tarhuna–Homs line. The British occupied Tripoli on 23 January; the Axis retreat from El Alamein had covered 1,400 mi (2,300 km). On 13 February, the last Axis soldiers left Libya and on 15 February, the rearguard reached the Mareth Line, 80 mi (130 km) inside Tunisia. Comando Supremo intended them to hold the line indefinitely but Rommel considered it too vulnerable to another flanking move, unlike the Wadi Akarit position further back.

=== Terrain ===
The broken terrain of southern Tunisia, with difficult rocky ridge lines and desert, limited manoeuvre; opposite the bight where the north–south coast opens to the east, a semi-arid, scrub covered coastal plain is met inland by the Matmata Hills which lie south to north. Across the plain in a line roughly south-west to north-east was the Mareth Line, fortifications built by the French in the 1930s. In the north, the hills and the line of forts ended at the Tebaga Gap, a mountain pass between the Matmata Hills and the Djebel Tebaga, another line of high ground to the west of the gap, running east–west. (Note: Also known as the Gabès gap, the coastal strip from Gabès to Wadi Akarit from the sea to the Chott el Fedjadj and the northwards ridges extending to the heights of Djebel Tebaga Fatnassa.) North and west of this feature is the Chott el Djerid and west of the Matmata Hills, dry Jebel Dahar country and then the impassable sand of the Grand Erg Oriental. Gabès lies on the coast, where the plain meets the route from the Tebaga Gap. North of Gabès, the road to Sfax passes between the sea and the chotts, was the only route north for the Eighth Army and it was blocked by the Mareth Line.

The Mareth Line followed the line of Wadi Zigzaou, a natural tank obstacle with steep banks rising up to 70 ft (21 m) high; the north-west side had been fortified by the French and subsequently reinforced. The wadi crosses the coastal plain from Zarat to Toujane and into the Matmata Hills beyond. In 1938, the French judged Jebel Dahar impassable for motorised transport, and so had not extended the Mareth Line any further inland, but in 1943, motor vehicles had much better performance. The British had an advantage because General Georges Catroux, the designer and garrison commander of the Mareth Line in the 1930s, was available in Algiers, to provide information and advice for the attack. In the original plan, Montgomery wrote "...the object of Operation Pugilist is to destroy the enemy now opposing Eighth Army in the Mareth Line and to advance and capture Sfax".

== Prelude ==
=== Battle of Medenine ===
The Battle of Medenine (Unternehmen Capri/Operation Capri), was an Axis spoiling attack at Medenine in Tunisia on 6 March 1943. The operation was intended to delay an attack by the British Eighth Army on the Mareth Line. Forewarned by Ultra decrypts of German wireless communications, the British rushed reinforcements from Tripoli and Benghazi before the Axis attack, which was a costly failure. General Erwin Rommel, the commander of Army Group Africa (Heeresgruppe Afrika), could not afford to lose men he needed to defend the Mareth Line, and abandoned the effort at dusk. The Eighth Army remained alert overnight in case of another Axis attempt and sent forward patrols to reconnoitre and demolish knocked-out Axis tanks. During the day the Luftwaffe and Regia Aeronautica had made a maximum effort with little effect against the Allied anti-aircraft defence and the Desert Air Force. On 7 March, the Axis forces began to withdraw north towards the Mareth Line. The Eighth Army pursued, slowed by rain. The Battle of Medenine was Rommel's last action in the North African Campaign. He returned to Europe for good soon afterwards.

== Battle ==
=== Operation Pugilist ===
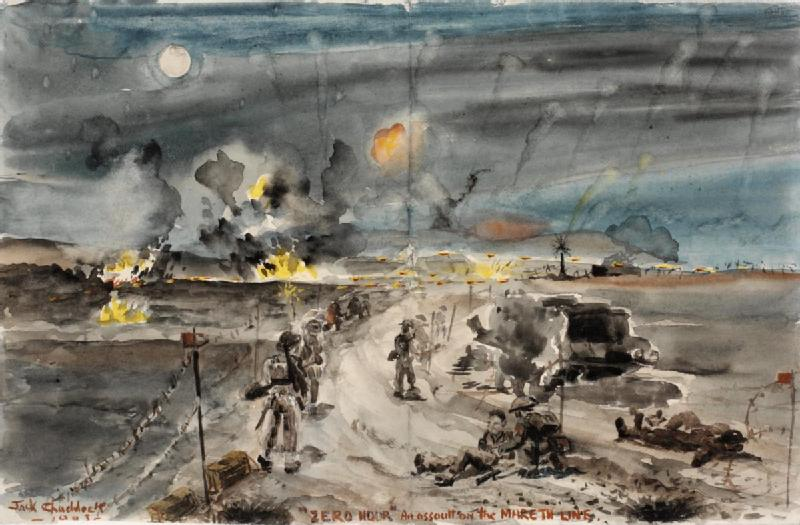
Zero Hour – Painting of the Queen's Own Cameron Highlanders advancing during the Battle of the Mareth Line, 1943

On 20 March 1943, XXX Corps (Lieutenant-General Oliver Leese) commenced Operation Pugilist. The 50th (Northumbrian) Infantry Division (Major-General John Nichols) managed to penetrate the line held by the 136th Armoured Division "Giovani Fascisti" near Zarat. Rain and the nature of the terrain prevented the deployment of tanks, aircraft or anti-tank guns, which left the infantry isolated. A counter-attack by 15th Panzer Division and the "Giovani Fascisti" on 22 March recaptured much of the bridgehead, 35 British tanks and 200 prisoners. British forces held their positions until darkness. On 24 March all the British attacking forces were recalled. XXX Corps prepared a new attack towards Tallouf, in which the 4th Indian Infantry Division (Major-General Francis Tuker) would make a night attack on 23/24 March around the inland end of the line, coinciding with a wide left hook manoeuvre by Montgomery.

==== Left hook ====
In early January 1943, a LRDG patrol had found a pass into the Jebel Dahar, which was given the name Wilder's Gap. A later patrol penetrated to the Tebaga Gap and proved that the route was practicable. The patrol demonstrated the weakness of Axis defences by going further north to Gafsa and on 2 February, made contact with the First Army advancing from the west. Montgomery reinforced the 2nd New Zealand Division (Lieutenant-General Bernard Freyberg) and renamed it the New Zealand Corps, for an attack through the Matmata Hills via Wilder's Gap, into the Jebel Dahar, with the assembly of the force concealed from Axis reconnaissance. Staff from X Corps (Lieutenant-General Brian Horrocks) were seconded to provide adequate HQ personnel for the new New Zealand Corps, too big for one divisional staff, which caused some friction between the two generals.

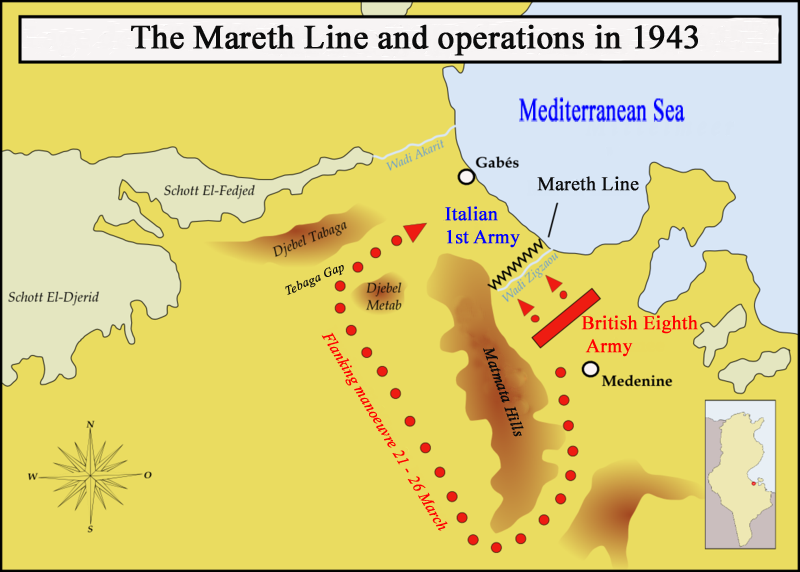
Mareth Line and attacks by Eighth Army on it during March 1943

The New Zealand Corps advance was planned in three stages, from a 20 mi (32 km) night march to Wadi bel Krecheb 19 March, a second night march of 40 mi (64 km) to just short of the Tebaga Gap and then the capture of the entrance to the gap at first light on 21 March or as soon as possible afterwards. The corps would then advance to El Hamma, which overlooks the coast road north of Gabès. The flank of the advance was to be protected by Free French forces (led by General Philippe Leclerc) and the 1st King's Dragoon Guards. An attack by X Corps from Al-Hamma to Gabès would cut off the 1st Army defenders of the Mareth positions and give the New Zealand Corps the opportunity to advance 80 mi (130 km) up the coast to Sfax and the landing grounds on the west side of the town.

The planning emphasized surprise and the ability to Blitz Axis positions. The corps had relatively few infantry and relied on its artillery to break Axis troop morale, with air support provided by fighters and bombers. A simultaneous frontal attack by XXX Corps on the Mareth Line would divide enemy attention and hamper an Axis counter-attack; the II US Corps of the First Army would advance through El Guettar to threaten Axis communications and pin down reinforcements from Sfax.

==== Free French forces (Force L) ====
After completing the conquest of the Fezzan and linking up with the British Eighth Army at Tripoli in late January 1943, the Free French column commanded by Général de brigade Philippe Leclerc (approximately 3,000–3,500 men) was re-named Force L and placed under Eighth Army command. The bulk of the force consisted of African troops from the Régiment de tirailleurs sénégalais du Tchad (RTST) and other colonial units, reinforced by European Free French personnel, elements of the 13th Demi-Brigade of the Foreign Legion, and the Greek Sacred Squadron (Colonel Christodoulos Tsigantes). Subordinate commanders included Lieutenant-Colonel Louis Dio, Commandant Vézinet and later Commandant Jean Rémy (commander of the attached Colonne volante).

Force L was lightly equipped by contemporary standards. Its artillery comprised a mixed battery of French 75 mm field and mountain guns together with a small number of British 25-pounders; anti-tank defence relied mainly on a limited number of 25 mm guns and captured or British weapons. Armoured support was initially restricted to a few armoured cars. In mid-March it was reinforced by Rémy’s Colonne volante, which brought additional armoured cars and a small number of Crusader tanks. Transport consisted largely of trucks and a few jeeps (notably those of the Greek squadron). British engineers and some anti-aircraft elements were also attached.

Montgomery assigned Force L the task of covering the inland (western) flank of the Eighth Army opposite the Mareth Line, particularly the sector around Ksar Rhilane. On 10 March 1943 a German force (elements of the 90th Light Division and supporting armoured reconnaissance units) attacked the French positions to eliminate the threat to the Axis western flank. Despite its sparse anti-tank resources, Force L, supported by the Desert Air Force, held its ground and repulsed the attacks, destroying or disabling a number of German vehicles. Montgomery congratulated Leclerc on the action.

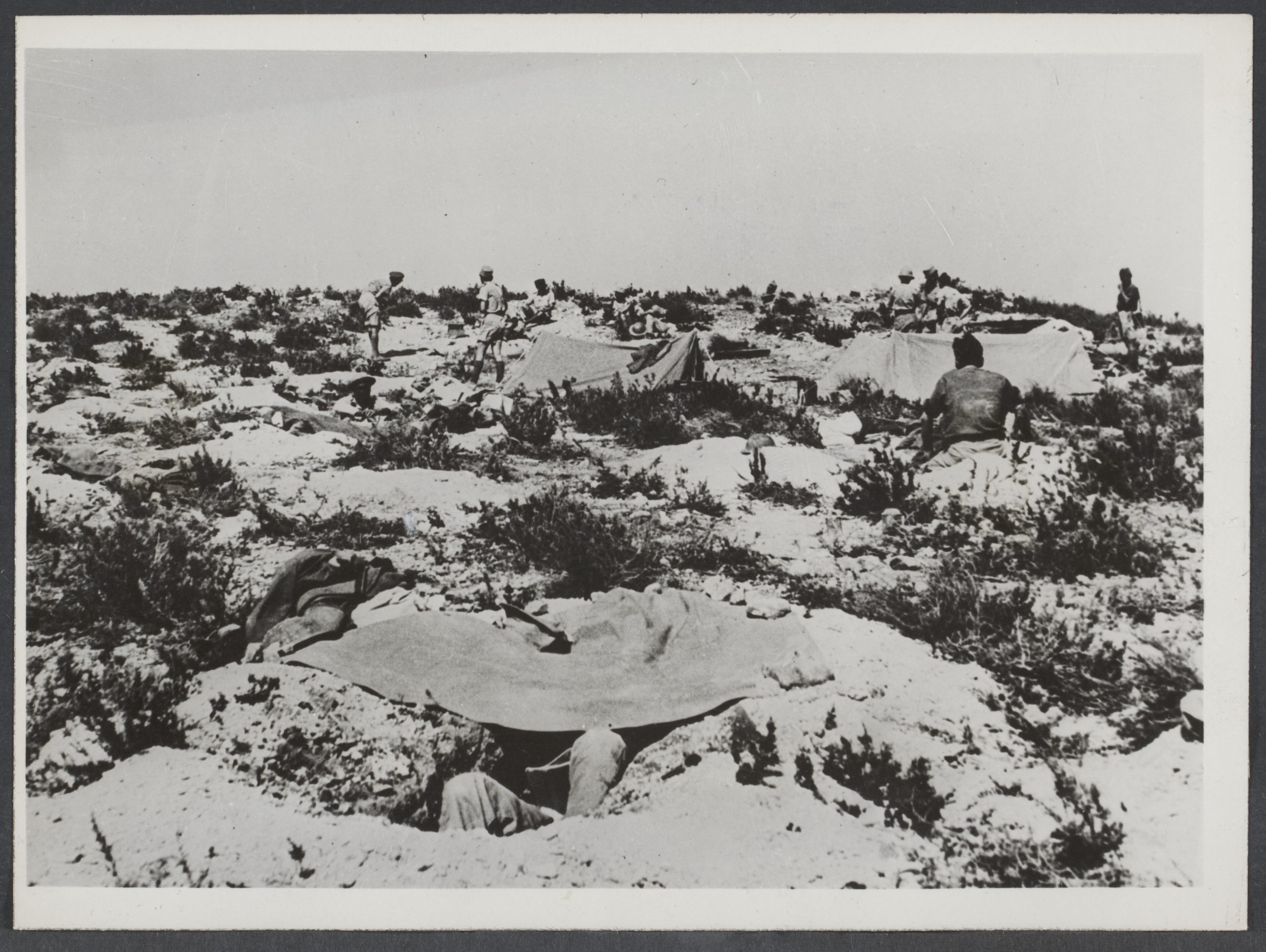
French troops of Force L under General Leclerc operating with the New Zealand Corps in southern Tunisia, March 1943

Force L was then placed under the operational control of the New Zealand Corps (Lieutenant-General Bernard Freyberg) for the left-hook manoeuvre through the Matmata Hills and the Tebaga Gap (Operations Pugilist and Supercharge II). It secured important high ground on the western flank of the corps and participated in the advance that forced the Axis withdrawal from the Mareth positions. Force L continued operations in southern Tunisia, including actions in the Gabès area.

After the end of the Tunisian campaign, Force L became the nucleus of the 2nd Free French Division and following its conversion to American equipment in Morocco, formed the basis of the 2e Division Blindée (2e DB). The participation of Force L formed part of the broader Free French effort under Charles de Gaulle to take part in the Allied campaign against the Axis, at a time when Free France was still seeking fuller recognition from Britain and the United States and while political competition continued with General Henri Giraud in North Africa.

=== Tebaga Gap ===
The New Zealand Corps engaged the Axis troops in the Tebaga Gap on 21 March but progress over the next four days against the 164th Light Afrika Division and 21st Panzer Division was very slow, although they did secure the entrance to the gap. On the Mareth Line, XXX Corps made some progress but did not break through. On 23 March, Montgomery ordered the 1st Armoured Division of Major-General Raymond Briggs of X Corps to reinforce the New Zealand Corps from reserve, where it was waiting to exploit the anticipated breakthroughs by either XXX Corps or the New Zealand Corps and Horrocks, with the X Corps Headquarters to take control of operations in the Tebaga Gap.

=== Operation Supercharge II ===
Operation Supercharge II was planned to start on the afternoon of 26 March, with a preliminary operation on the night of 25/26 March to capture Height 184. The New Zealand Corps was to attack into the Tebaga Gap on a two-brigade front and capture the Axis defences from Djebel Tebaga to Djebel Melab, which would be exploited by the 1st Armoured Division. After assembling during the night and lying in concealed positions all day, the 5th New Zealand Brigade was to attack on the right and the 6th New Zealand Brigade on the left, preceded by the 8th Armoured Brigade and a creeping barrage by the New Zealand and X Corps artillery. The attacking troops were to move to high ground 2,000 yd (1,800 m) forward and then to a second objective at a wadi 2,500 yd (2,300 m) further on. The 1st Armoured Division, led by the 2nd Armoured Brigade, was to move through at 6:15 p.m. to an area 3,000 yd (2,700 m) beyond the New Zealand Corps final objective and as soon as the moon rose (at about 11:15 p.m.), advance on El Hamma.

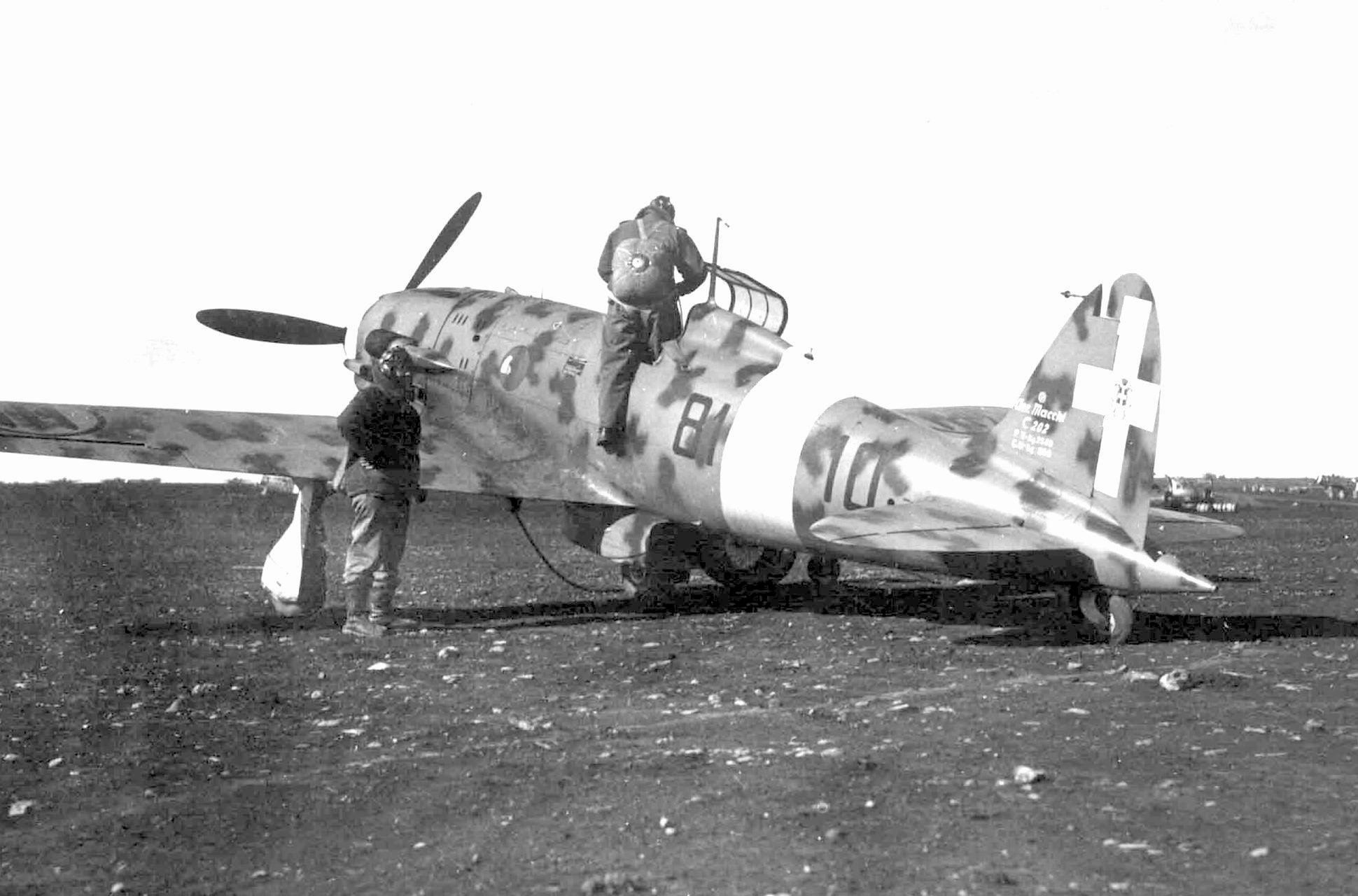
An Italian pilot climbs into a Macchi 202 during the battle

RAF heavy bombers would begin harassment of the Axis defenders led by General Messe the night before, with attacks on transport and communications until 3:30 p.m. Day bombers would then begin low-altitude pattern bombing, to add to Axis disorganisation, followed by relays of fighter-bombers every 15 minutes for 2 1/2 hours. Spitfires would escort the bombers and fighter-bombers and the remainder of the Northwest African Tactical Air Force (NATAF) would bomb Axis airfields. An RAF forward observation officer was to brief pilots by nominating landmarks, marking targets with red and blue smoke; friendly troops were to use orange smoke and the artillery would fire smoke shells to signal to the aircrews. On 24 March, Arnim doubted that an Eighth Army attack was likely and was more concerned about Maknassy further north. Despite the slow advance in the south, Arnim wanted the 1st Army to withdraw to Wadi Akarit on 25 March but Liebenstein and Messe preferred to counter-attack with the 15th Panzer Division. The threat to Maknassy and the possibility of the II US Corps reaching Gabès and cutting off the 1st Army, meant that they had to retire from Mareth and then from Tebaga.

Height 184 fell at 2:50 a.m. to the 21st New Zealand Battalion and the Allied artillery commenced firing at 4:00 p.m.. The attack began with the 8th Armoured Brigade, followed by infantry battalion carriers and then infantry on foot. It appeared that the 164th Light and 21st Panzer divisions had not expected a daylight assault and had been surprised; the setting sun, wind and dust had made observation difficult. The British tanks had been ordered to press on and the infantry also managed a quick pace, arriving on the first objective and then kept going, despite increasing resistance and delays. An armoured regiment pressed on to Wadi Aisoub beyond the second objective, followed by the 23rd New Zealand Battalion. On the left, a minefield covered by anti-tank guns was bypassed on both sides to close up to the second objective, clearing a gap for the 1st Armoured Division, despite many Axis posts holding out in the vicinity.

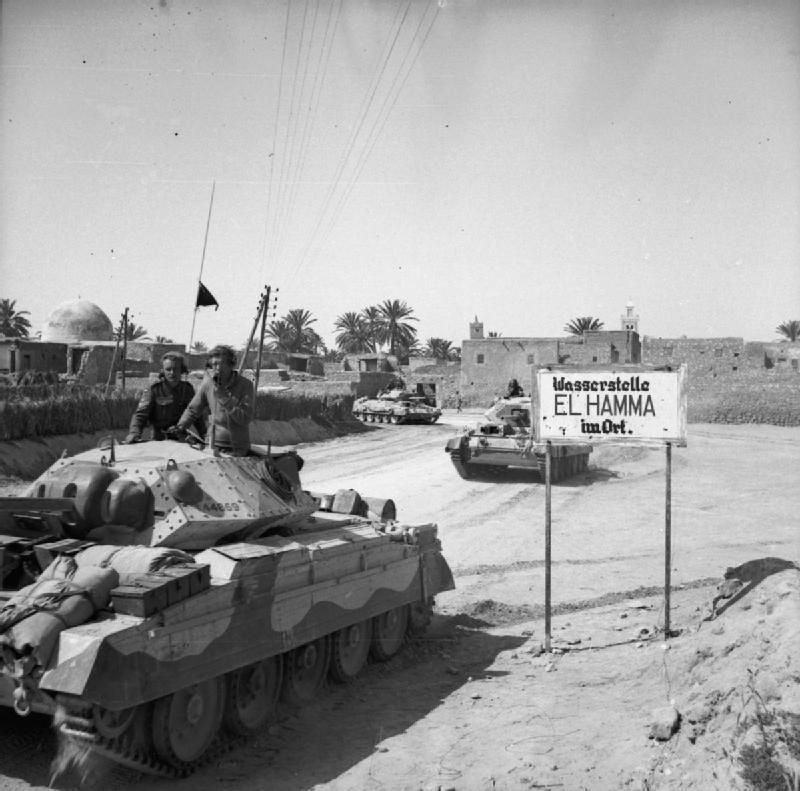
Crusader tanks of the 1st Armoured Division enter El Hamma, 29 March 1943

By dark a gap in the defences had been made; pausing until moonrise at 11:00 p.m., the 1st Armoured Division advanced through the gap and rapidly moved on El Hamma, 20 mi (32 km) to the north-east, halfway to Gabès on the coast. On the morning of 27 March, the 15th Panzer Division was brought out of reserve to counter-attack the New Zealand Corps on their right flank. By 9:00 a.m., the attack had been repulsed and the New Zealand Corps advanced into the hills on their right. By the evening of 27 March, German resistance had been broken and the line of communication forward to the 1st Armoured Division secured, the division having been halted by the defences of El Hamma, while the tanks had waited for the moonlight. Freyberg persuaded Horrocks that the New Zealand Corps, en route to El Hamma to link with the 1st Armoured Division, should branch off to the right to avoid the Axis defences at El Hamma and head across the broken ground direct to Gabès.

By 28 March, General Messe gave the order that all Axis forces on the Mareth Line be withdrawn to face X Corps and New Zealand Corps on their right flank but by holding up the 1st Armoured Division at El Hamma, managed to avoid encirclement. On 29 March, the New Zealand Corps took Gabès, which forced a further Axis withdrawal to a new line 15 mi (24 km) to the rear of Gabès at Wadi Akarit, while the 164th Light, 15th Panzer and 21st Panzer divisions fought rearguard actions. El Hamma was evacuated on 29 March, leaving the way open for the 1st Armoured Division to advance northward with the New Zealand Corps on their right.

== Aftermath ==
=== Casualties ===
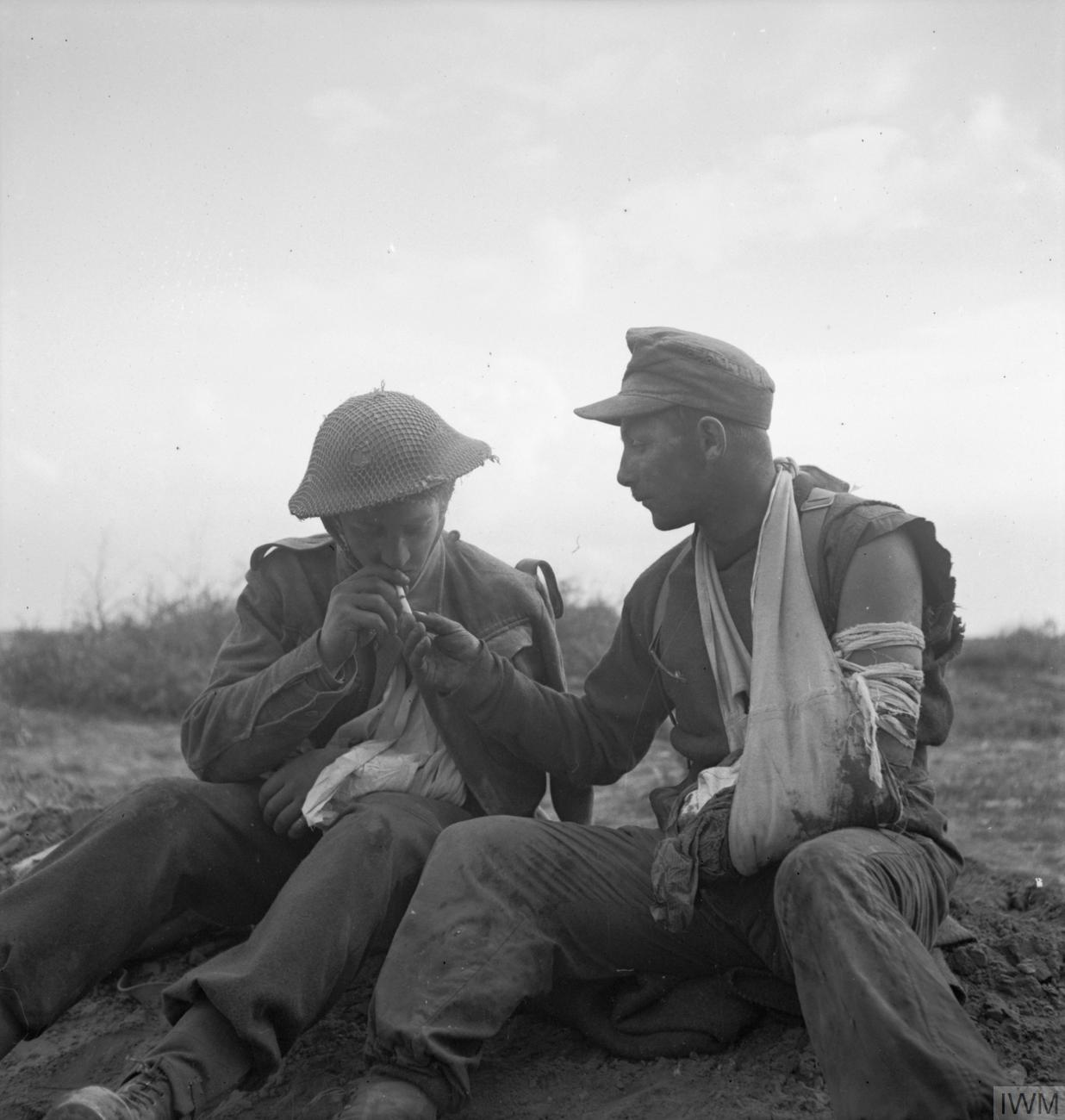
A captured German and a wounded British soldier share a cigarette after the battle

On 31 March, Operation Supercharge II was terminated, having cost the Eighth Army 4,000 casualties, many from the 50th Northumbrian Infantry Division and a large number of tanks; the New Zealand Corps lost 51 tanks and 945 men. The corps was disbanded and its elements were distributed between X and XXX corps. On 30 March, Montgomery sent the following message to Freyberg,

My very best congratulations to NZ Corps and 10 Corps on splendid results achieved by the left hook. These results have led to the complete disintegration of the enemy resistance and the whole Mareth position. Give my congratulations to all your officers and men, and tell them how pleased I am with all they have done.

— Montgomery

The Axis forces, despite withdrawing in relatively good order to Wadi Akarit, lost over 7,000 prisoners, of whom 2,500 were German. The 15th Panzer Division had suffered many losses, the 164th Light Afrika Division lost most of its weapons and vehicles. The 80th Infantry Division "La Spezia" suffered losses of nearly 50 per cent and the 16th Infantry Division "Pistoia" was almost annihilated; several Italian divisions were amalgamated.

== Orders of battle ==
=== Eighth Army ===
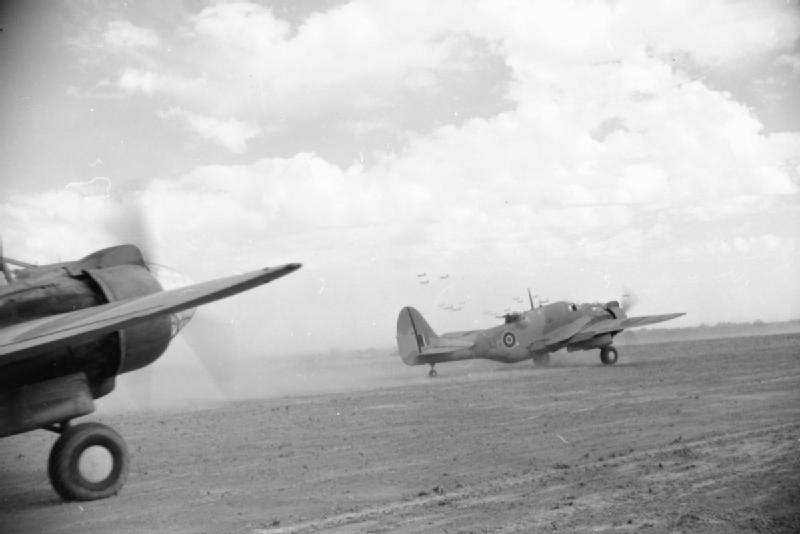
Desert Air Force Baltimores taking off from Ben Gardane to bomb the Mareth Line

- General Sir Bernard Montgomery

XXX Corps (Lieut.-General Oliver Leese)

- 50th (Northumbrian) Infantry Division
- 51st (Highland) Infantry Division
- 4th Indian Infantry Division
- 201st Guards Brigade
- 23rd Armoured Brigade

New Zealand Corps (Lieut.-General Bernard Freyberg)

- 2nd New Zealand Division
- 8th Armoured Brigade
- 1st King's Dragoon Guards
- 64th Medium Regiment, Royal Artillery
- 57th Anti-Tank Regiment, Royal Artillery
- One Battery 53rd Light Anti-Aircraft Regiment, Royal Artillery
- Leclerc Force (with the Greek Sacred Squadron)

X Corps (Lieut.-General Brian Horrocks)

- 1st Armoured Division
- 7th Armoured Division (including 4th Light Armoured Brigade, less King's Dragoon Guards)
- Free French Flying Column

=== Italian 1st Army ===
- (General Giovanni Messe)

XX Army Corps (General Taddeo Orlando)

- German 90th Leichte Afrika Division
- 101st Motorised Division "Trieste"
- 136th Armoured Division "Giovani Fascisti"

XXI Army Corps (General Paolo Berardi)

- 16th Motorised Division "Pistoia"
- 80th Infantry Division "La Spezia"
- German 164th Leichte Afrika Division

Reserve

- German 15th Panzer Division

Tebaga

- Saharan Group

Uncommitted

- German 21st Panzer Division

Gafsa front

- German 10th Panzer Division
- Centauro Group

The German 19th Flak Division, with sixteen 88 mm batteries and several 20 mm anti-aircraft batteries, was on the coast, the 1st Luftwaffe Brigade, little stronger than a battalion, was behind the "Giovani Fascisti" and the Panzer Grenadier Regiment Afrika watched the main Gabès–Mareth road. These and the 164th Leichte Afrika Division, were the only mobile infantry groups available.

== See also ==
- List of British military equipment of World War II
- List of French military equipment of World War II
- List of German military equipment of World War II
- List of Italian Army equipment in World War II
- Tunisia Campaign
- North African campaign timeline
- List of World War II Battles
- Panzer Army Africa
