= El Guettar, Tunisia =

El Guettar
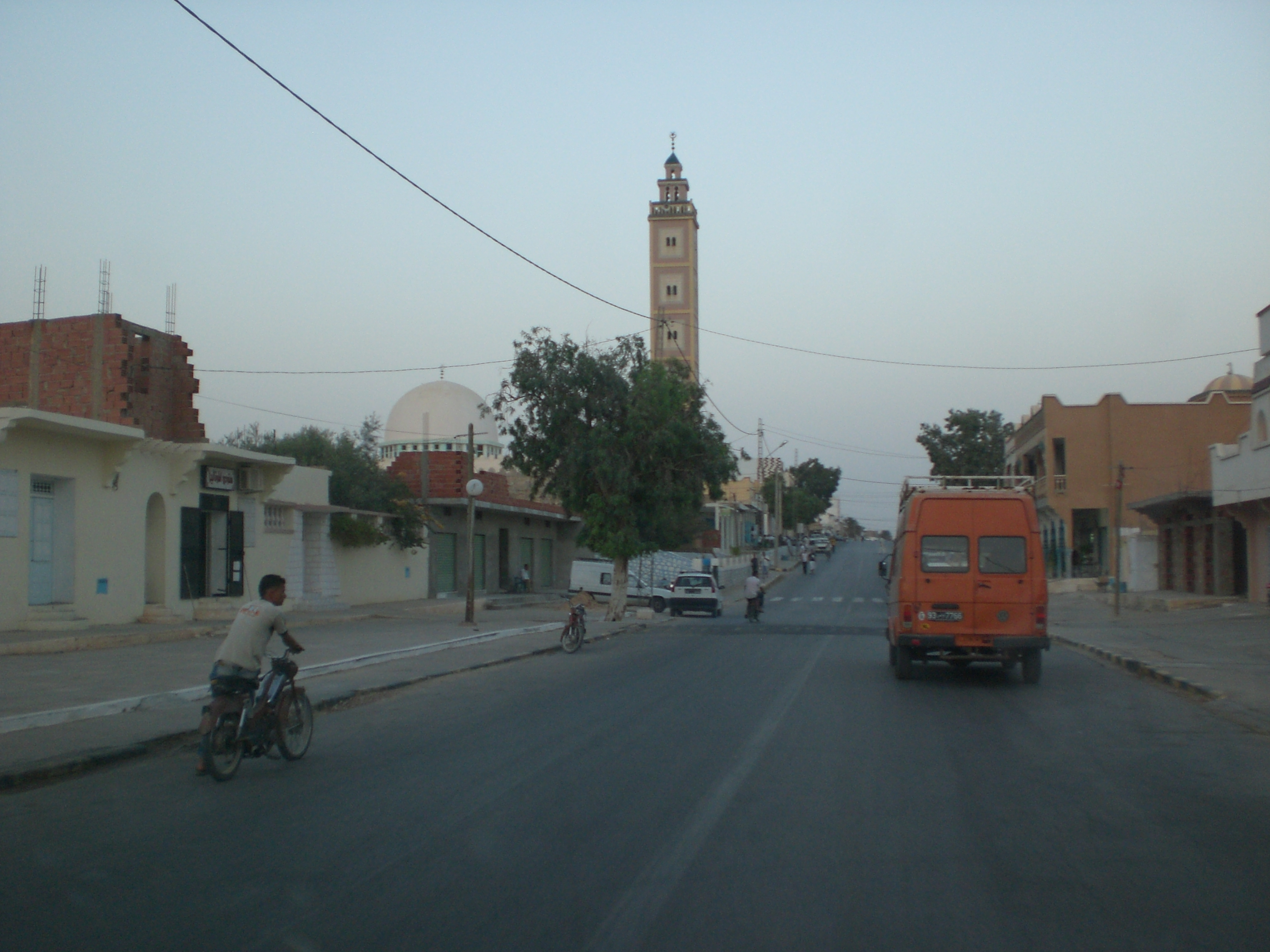

- Location in Tunisia
- Coordinates: 34°20′14″N 8°57′10″E
- Country: Tunisia
- Governorate: Gafsa Governorate

Population (2014)
  - Total: 14,088
- Time zone: UTC1 (CET)

El Guettar (Arabic: القطار Al Qaṭār) is a town in central Tunisia in Gafsa Governorate. It is traditionally known for its pistachio nuts.

== History ==
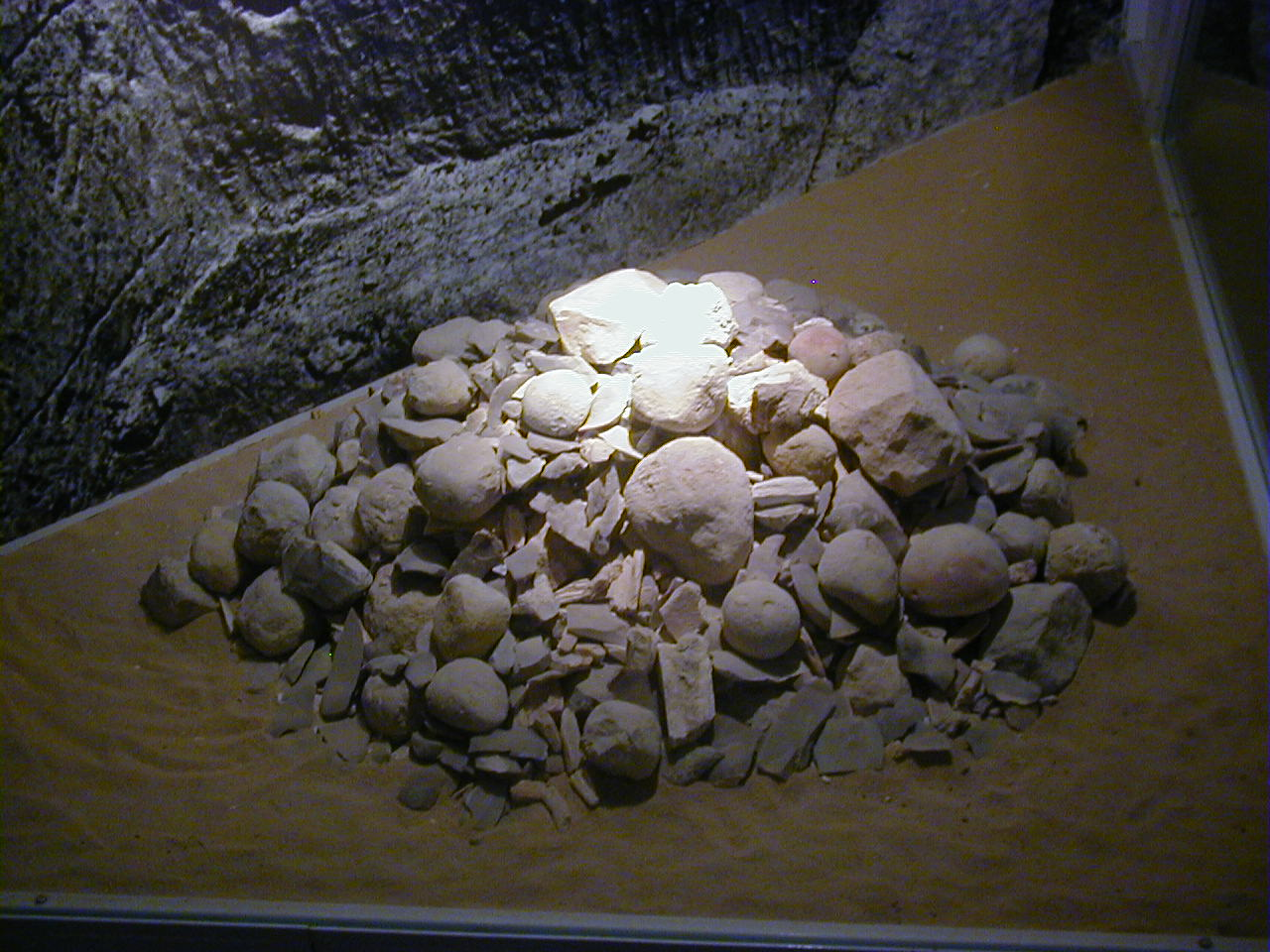
Hermanion of El Guettar, currently in the Bardo Natinonal Museum

In the 1950s, archaeologists found a crown of balls, 4,000 silex, mammal's teeth and bones of animals laid out near a dried up watering hole which is some 40,000 years old. Testimony of devotion with regard to a spirit of the waters, source of any life, and ruins which may constitute the oldest religious "building" known in the world (Hermaïon of El Guettar).

During World War II the town was the site of the Battle of El Guettar between American forces under George S. Patton, and elements of the German Afrika Korps led by general Jürgen von Arnim, as well as Italian forces led by General Giovanni Messe in early 1943.

== Population ==
2014 Census (Municipal)
Homes	Families	Males	Females	Total
4157	3343	6664	7424	14088

== See also ==
- Culture of Tunisia
- Battle of El Guettar
