= 131st Armored Division "Centauro" =

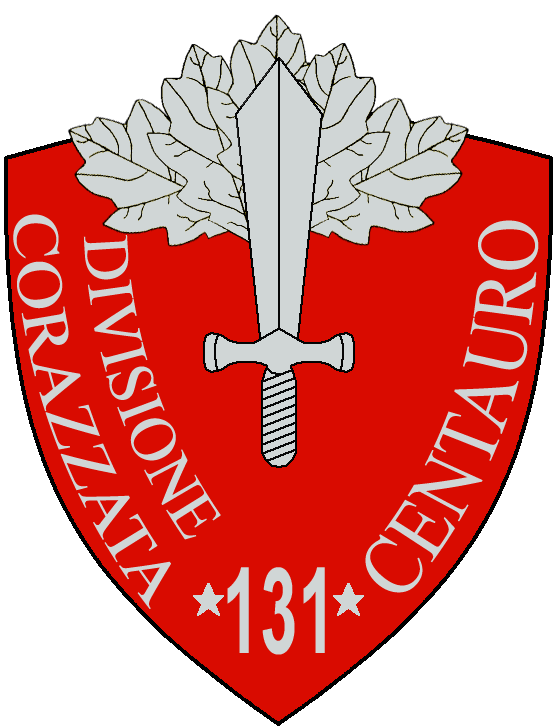
- 131st Armored Division "Centauro" insignia
- Active: 20 April 1939 - 18 April 1943
- Country: Kingdom of Italy
- Branch: Royal Italian Army
- Type: Armored
- Role: Armoured warfare
- Size: Division
- Garrison/HQ: Siena
- Engagements: World War II; Greco-Italian War; Invasion of Yugoslavia; Tunisian campaign; Battle of Kasserine Pass; Battle of El Guettar

Insignia
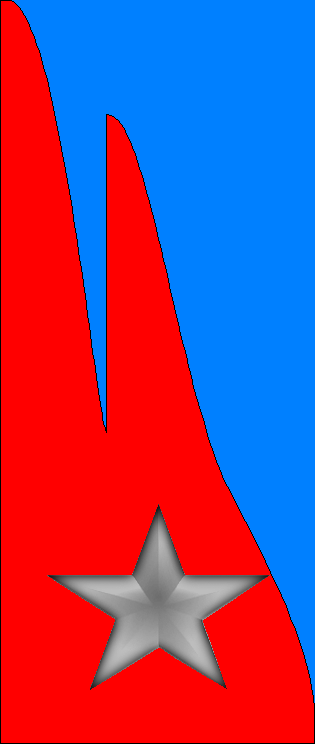
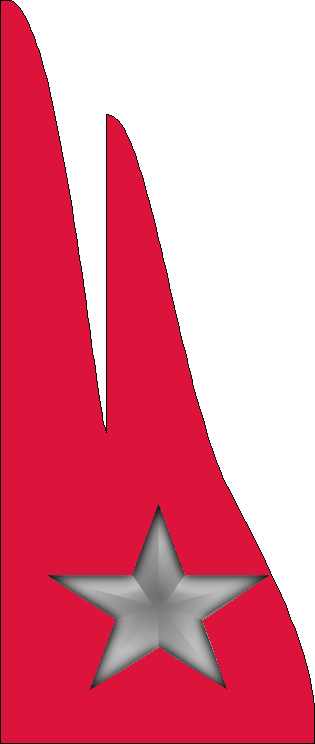
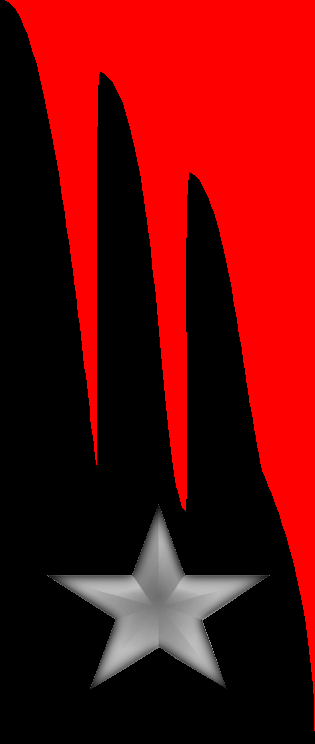
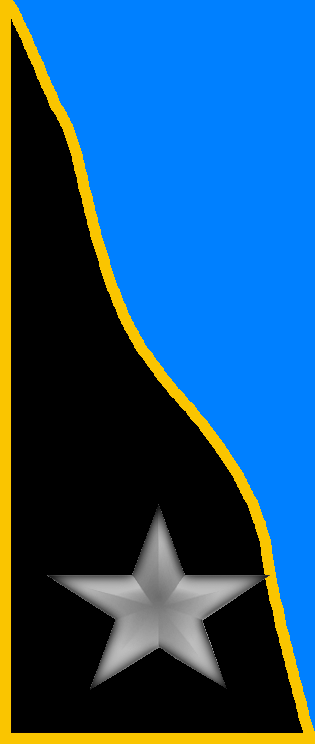
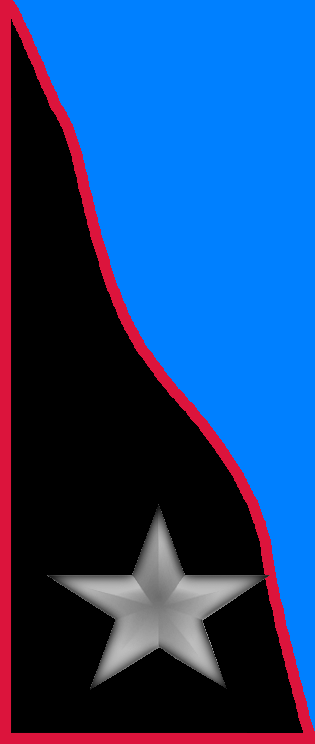
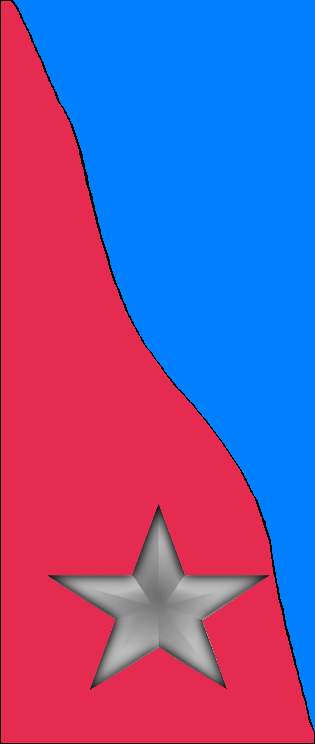
- Identification symbol: WWII Centauro gorget patches

The 131st Armored Division "Centauro" (Italian: 131ª Divisione corazzata "Centauro") was an armored division of the Italian Army during World War II. The division was formed in April 1939 by expanding the I Armored Brigade (I Brigata Corazzata). The division's name came from the mythological race of half human-half horse creatures named Centaurs. The division participated in the invasion of Albania, Greco-Italian War, and invasion of Yugoslavia. In August 1942 the division was sent to Libya to participate in the Western Desert Campaign. After the Axis defeat at the Second Battle of El Alamein the division retreated with the German-Italian Panzer Army to Tunisia, where the division participated in the Tunisian Campaign. On 18 April 1943 the division was disbanded due to the losses suffered in the Battle of El Guettar.

== History ==
On 1 June 1936 the I Motor-mechanized Brigade was formed in Siena, which consisted of the 5th Bersaglieri Regiment and other minor units. On 15 July 1937 the 31st Tank Infantry Regiment was formed in Siena and assigned to the brigade. On the same date the brigade was renamed I Armored Brigade. On 20 April 1939 the 131st Armored Artillery Regiment was formed in Cremona and assigned to the brigade, which on that date was renamed 131st Armored Division "Centauro".

=== World War II ===
==== Greco-Italian War ====
In April 1939 Italy invaded Albania and formed the Italian protectorate of Albania. In summer 1939 the division moved to Tirana. On 28 October 1940 the division participated in the Italian attack on Greece, which started the Greco-Italian War. The main body of the division advanced towards Kalpaki in Epirus but Greek resistance stopped the division before reaching its goals. On 23 November 1940 the Greek launched an offensive, which drove the Italian units back into Albania. The Centauro unsuccessfully tried to stop the Greek advance at the Battle of Klisura Pass and then in Tepelenë. Due to the heavy losses the division was taken out of the line on 4 February 1941 to be rebuilt. The 31st Tank Infantry Regiment was reinforced with the IV Tank Battalion M from the 32nd Tank Infantry Regiment, while the 5th Bersaglieri Regiment was replaced temporarily by the 1st Bersaglieri Regiment.

==== Invasion of Yugoslavia ====
In late March 1941 the division moved in preparation for the Invasion of Yugoslavia to Shkodër in northern Albania. After the war's start on 6 April 1941 the Centauro together with the 18th Infantry Division "Messina" and 32nd Infantry Division "Marche" defeated a Yugoslav attack towards Shkodër. On 16 April 1941 the division crossed into Yugoslavia north of Koplik and advanced to Kotor, Cetinje and Podgorica. On 17 April the Centauro reached Trebinje, where it met up with units of the 133rd Armored Division "Littorio", which had advanced southward from Istria. On 11 May 1941 the division began the return transfer to its bases in Tuscany. On 31 July 1941 the 5th Bersaglieri Regiment returned to the division and relieved the 1st Bersaglieri Regiment.

==== North Africa ====
Due to the experience of fighting in the Western Desert Italian armored Divisions were re-organized in 1942 and consisted on paper of three tank and three infantry battalions, a large artillery regiment, two battalions of self-propelled guns, one anti-aircraft battalion, one reconnaissance grouping, and a mixed engineer battalion. In October 1942 the Centauro was transferred to Libya. The division did not participate in the Second Battle of El Alamein and the first units of the division arrived at the front during the retreat from Egypt in late 1942.

On 13 December 1942 the units of the division already in Libya and the Tactical Group "Ariete" forced the British 7th Armoured Division to retreat during the Battle of El Agheila. The division retreated with Axis forces from Libya to Tunisia, where the division ceded part of its units to the L Special Brigade and part of its materiel to other divisions. During the Battle of the Kasserine Pass troops of the Centauro overran the part of the US forces defending Highway 13.

The division participated in the Battle of El Guettar, where it was severely decimated. From 7 April 1943 the division's remaining personnel and equipment were assigned to the 16th Infantry Division "Pistoia". On 18 April 1943 the Centauro was declared lost due to wartime events.

==== 136th Armored Legionary Division "Centauro" ====
On 15 August 1943 the Royal Italian Army activated the 136th Armored Legionary Division "Centauro", which continued the tradition of the 131st Armored Division "Centauro". After the announcement of the Armistice of Cassibile on 8 September 1943 the 136th Armored Legionary Division "Centauro" was disbanded by the invading Germans on 12 September 1943.

=== Post War ===
On 1 April 1951 the Italian Army raised the Armored Brigade "Centauro" in Verona, which on 1 November 1959 was expanded to Armored Division "Centauro".

== Organization ==
=== Organization in Italy ===
131st Armored Division "Centauro" organization in 1940.png

- 131st Armored Division "Centauro"
  - Headquarters
    - Command Company
    - 106th Carabinieri Section
    - 131st Field Post Office
    - 131st Armored Division Command Transport Squad
  - 5th Bersaglieri Regiment
    - Command Company
    - XIV Auto-transported Battalion
      - Command Company, 2 × Bersaglieri companies
    - XXII Motorcyclists Battalion (reorganized as XXII Support Weapons Battalion in September 1941)
      - Command Company, 3 × Motorcyclists companies
    - XXIV Auto-transported Battalion (joined the regiment in 1940)
      - Command Company, 2 × Bersaglieri companies
    - 5th Cannons Company (47/32 mod. 35 anti-tank guns; disbanded in September 1941)
    - 5th Motorcyclists Company (formed in September 1941)
    - Transport Unit
  - 31st Tank Infantry Regiment
    - Command Company
    - I Tank Battalion L (L3/35 tankettes; disbanded in October 1941)
    - II Tank Battalion L (L3/35 tankettes; disbanded in October 1941)
    - III Tank Battalion L (L3/35 tankettes; disbanded in September 1941 to form the LI Tank Battalion M)
    - IV Tank Battalion L (L3/35 tankettes; disbanded in September 1941 to form the LI Tank Battalion M)
    - IV Tank Battalion M (M13/40 tanks; arrived from the 32nd Tank Infantry Regiment in January 1941; transferred to the 133rd Tank Infantry Regiment in April 1942)
    - XII Tank Battalion M (M14/41 tanks; arrived from the 32nd Tank Infantry Regiment in October 1941; transferred to the 133rd Tank Infantry Regiment in November 1941)
    - XIII Tank Battalion M (M13/40 tanks; arrived from the 32nd Tank Infantry Regiment in October 1941; transferred to the 132nd Tank Infantry Regiment in summer 1942)
    - XIV Tank Battalion M (M14/41 tanks, joined the regiment in spring 1942)
    - XV Tank Battalion M (M14/41 tanks, joined the regiment in spring 1942)
    - XVII Tank Battalion M (M14/41 tanks, joined the regiment in spring 1942)
    - LI Tank Battalion M (M14/41 tanks; formed in September 1941; transferred to the 133rd Tank Infantry Regiment in February 1942)
  - 131st Tank Infantry Regiment (assigned to the division from 15 August 1941 to 2 January 1942)
    - Command Company
    - CI Tank Battalion R35 (captured French Renault R35 light tanks)
    - CII Tank Battalion R35 (captured French R35 light tanks)
    - CC Tank Battalion SOMUA (captured French SOMUA S35 tanks)
  - 131st Artillery Regiment "Centauro"
    - Command Unit
    - I Group (75/27 mod. 11 field guns)
    - II Group (75/27 mod. 11 field guns)
    - III Group (75/27 mod. 11 field guns; formed October 1940)
    - 2 × Anti-aircraft batteries (20/65 mod. 35 anti-aircraft guns; joined the regiment in October 1940)
    - Ammunition and Supply Unit
  - 131st Anti-tank Company (47/32 mod. 35 anti-tank guns)
  - 141st Anti-tank Company (47/32 mod. 35 anti-tank guns; transferred to the 9th Infantry Division "Pasubio" for the deployment in the Soviet Union)
  - 131st Mixed Engineer Company
  - 131st Medical Section
  - 131st Supply Section
  - 131st Mixed Transport Unit

=== Organization in North Africa ===
131st Armored Division "Centauro" organization in 1942

- 131st Armored Division "Centauro"
  - Headquarters
    - Command Company
    - 106th Carabinieri Section
    - 131st Field Post Office (replaced in February 1943 by the 212th Field Post Office)
    - 131st Armored Division Command Transport Squad
  - Armored Reconnaissance Grouping "Cavalleggeri di Lodi"
    - Command Squadron
    - I Group (transferred to the L Special Brigade in February 1943
      - 1 × Armored Car Squadron (AB 41 armored cars), 2 × Tank squadrons (L6/40 light tanks), 1 × Motorcyclists Squadron
    - II Group
      - 1 × Self-propelled Squadron (Semovente da 47/32 self-propelled guns), 1 × Anti-aircraft Squadron (truck mounted 20/65 mod. 35 anti-aircraft guns)
  - 5th Bersaglieri Regiment
    - Command Company
    - XIV Auto-transported Battalion
      - Command Company, 2 × Bersaglieri companies, 1 × Anti-tank Company (47/32 mod. 35 anti-tank guns)
    - XXII Support Weapons Battalion
      - Command Platoon, 1 × Machine Gun Company (Breda M37 heavy machine guns), 1 × Mortar Company (81mm mod. 35 mortars), 1 × Anti-aircraft Company (20/65 mod. 35 anti-aircraft guns)
    - XXIV Auto-transported Battalion
      - Command Company, 2 × Bersaglieri companies, 1 × Anti-tank Company (47/32 mod. 35 anti-tank guns)
    - 5th Motorcyclists Company
    - Transport Unit
  - 31st Tank Infantry Regiment
    - Command Company
    - XIV Tank Battalion M (M14/41 tanks)
    - XV Tank Battalion M (M14/41 tanks; transferred to the L Special Brigade in November 1942)
    - XVII Tank Battalion M (M14/41 tanks)
    - Anti-aircraft Company (truck mounted 20/65 mod. 35 anti-aircraft guns)
  - 131st Artillery Regiment "Centauro"
    - Command Unit
    - I Group (75/27 mod. 06 howitzers)
    - II Group (75/27 mod. 06 howitzers)
    - III Group (105/28 cannons)
    - IV Mixed Anti-aircraft Group (formed August 1941; later renumbered DII Anti-aircraft Group)
      - 2 × Anti-aircraft/Anti-tank batteries (90/53 anti-aircraft guns mounted on Lancia 3Ro trucks)
      - 2 × Anti-aircraft batteries (20/65 mod. 35 anti-aircraft guns)
    - V Self-propelled Group (Semovente da 75/18 self-propelled guns; later renumbered DLIII Self-propelled Group)
    - VI Self-propelled Group (Semovente da 75/18 self-propelled guns; later renumbered DLIV Self-propelled Group; transferred in August 1942 to the 133rd Artillery Regiment "Littorio")
    - DLIX Self-propelled Group (Semovente da 75/18 self-propelled guns; joined the regiment in North Africa after the 133rd Armored Division "Littorio" was destroyed in the Second Battle of El Alamein)
  - 132nd Anti-tank Regiment (joined the division on 1 January 1943)
    - Command Company
    - I Anti-tank Battalion "Ariete" (3× companies with 8× 47/32 mod. 35 anti-tank guns per company; formed with the survivors of the 132nd Tank Infantry Regiment)
    - II Anti-tank Battalion "Littorio" (3× companies with 8× 47/3 mod. 35 anti-tank guns per company; formed with the survivors of the 133rd Tank Infantry Regiment)
    - III Anti-tank Battalion "Trieste" (2× companies with 8× 47/3 mod. 35 anti-tank guns per company; formed with the survivors of the XI Tank Battalion M13/40 of the 101st Motorized Division "Trieste")
    - 9th Anti-tank Company (8× 47/3 anti-tank guns)
  - CXXXVI Self-propelled Anti-tank Battalion (Semovente da 47/32 self-propelled guns)
  - XXXI Mixed Engineer Battalion
    - 131st Engineer Company
    - 231st Connections Company
  - 131st Medical Section
  - 131st Supply Section
  - 131st Mixed Transport Unit

Attached to the division during the Tunisian campaign:

- XVIII Carabinieri Battalion

== Commanding officers ==
The division's commanding officers were:

- Generale di Brigata Giovanni Magli (1939 - 24 December 1940)
- Colonel Mario Giglioni (acting, 25–30 December 1940)
- Generale di Brigata Gioacchino Solinas (acting, 31 December 1940 - 3 February 1941)
- Generale di Brigata Giovanni Magli (4-23 February 1941)
- Generale di Brigata Gavino Pizzolato (24 February 1941 - 28 February 1942)
- Generale di Divisione Giorgio Calvi di Bergolo (1 March 1942 - 18 April 1943)

== Bibliography ==
- Paoletti, Ciro (2008). A Military History of Italy. Greenwood Publishing Group. ISBN 978-0-275-98505-9.
- George F. Nafziger - Italian Order of Battle: An organizational history of the Italian Army in World War II (3 vol)
- John Joseph Timothy Sweet - Iron Arm: The Mechanization of Mussolini's Army, 1920-1940
