= Energy in Tunisia =

The energy sector in Tunisia includes all production, processing and, transit of energy consumption in this country. The production involves the upstream sector that includes general oil and gas, the downstream sector that includes the only refinery in Tunisia and most of the production of natural gas, and varied electrical/renewable energies. Renewable energy has been a strong point of focus for Tunisia as they look to optimize their green energy sources and advance their developing country. The Tunisian government has partnered with Russia and France in hopes of establishing nuclear energy as a viable alternative to fossil fuels and taking up a nontrivial chunk of the energy production in Tunisia. This is expected to be accomplished in the 2020s.

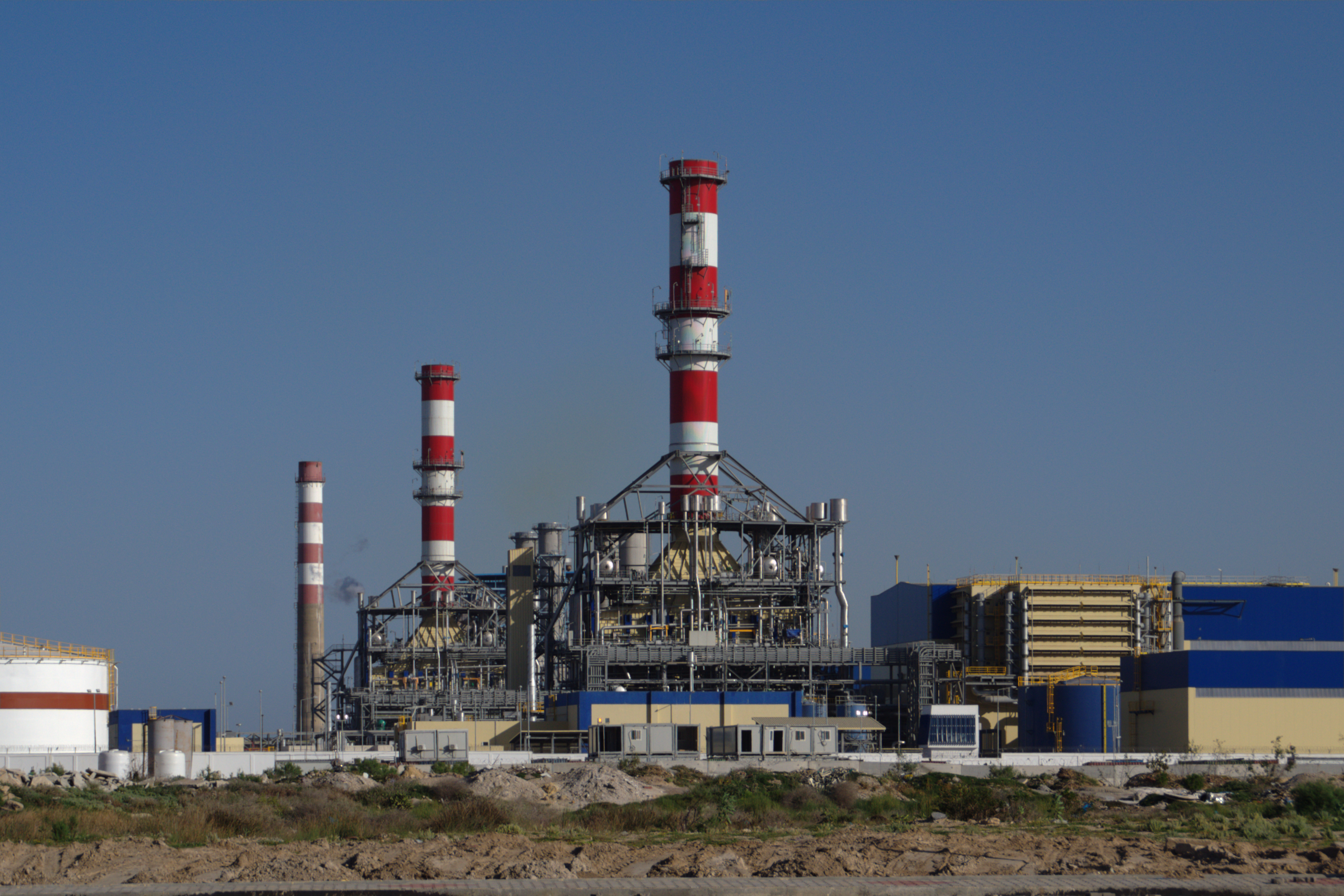
Sousse thermal power station, combined gas cycle belonging to STEG.

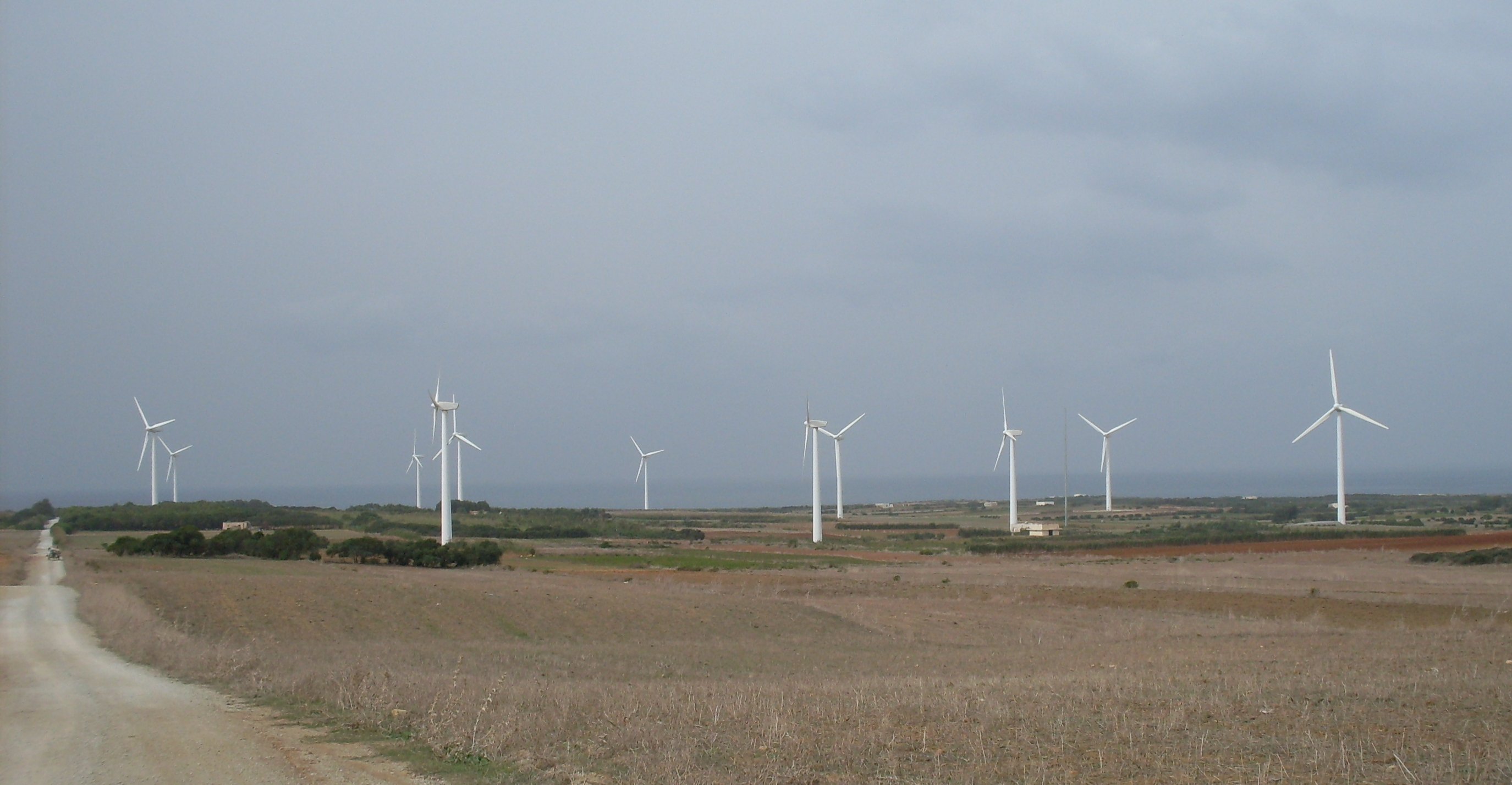
Wind farm of Sidi Daoud.

== Oil and gas upstream sector ==
Tunisia is a small producer of oil and natural gas. Oil production began in 1966, was at 118,000 barrels/day in 1980, and was at 63,000 barrels/day in 2015. The country is a net importer from the year 2000 onwards. The country's main deposit is also the first to be discovered: El Borma, in 1964, on the Tunisian-Algerian border.

The Gulf of Gabes offers offshore production centered on the Ashtart deposit, put into production in 1974 by, at the time, Elf Aquitaine. Gas production increased in the 2000s thanks to two offshore deposits, Miskar (producing from 2006) and Hasdrubal (2009). These two deposits are now experiencing a natural decline in production.

The Zarat deposit, offshore at the south of the Pelagian Basin, is scheduled to come into service around 2020 and boost national production somewhat.

The production rate of crude oil in Tunisia was 35.4 thousand barrels per day in 2022, down from 40.4 thousand barrels per day in 2021.

Production of petroleum was at 33.2 thousand barrels per day at the end of February 2023, down from 37.8 thousand barrels per day at the end of February 2022. The main Tunisian fields at the time (February 2023) included Halk el Manzel (entered production in 2021), Ashtart, El borma, Adam, MLD, Cherouq, El Hajeb /Guebiba, Gherib, Hasdrubal and Cercina.

The production rate of crude oil in Tunisia was 29.2 thousand barrels/day at the end of September 2024.

== Downstream sector ==
=== Refining ===
The only refinery in the country, managed by the Tunisian Company of Refining Industries, is located in Bizerte. Its capacity is 34,000 barrels / day, which is a much lower production than the country's consumption, which therefore imports refined products, diesel chiefly. Refined petroleum is essentially imported too.

=== Transit of natural gas ===
The Trans-Mediterranean Pipeline, one of the gas pipelines that allow the export of Algerian gas to Italy, crosses Tunisian territory. It operates since 1983. In return for the crossing of its territory, Tunisia is entitled to 5.625% of the gas, in kind or in money, in accordance with a treaty of 1977. The capacity of the Trans-Mediterranean Pipeline is increased gradually, increasing also the Tunisian quota which, added to the national production and gas bought directly to Algeria, ensures the consumption of the country.

=== Consumption ===
According to the Energy Information Administration, Tunisia's consumption in 2015 was 98,000 barrels/day.

Natural gas consumption is in the order of 6.5 km^{3}, of which more than half is imported via the Trans-Mediterranean Pipeline. 70% of the gas is used for the production of electricity, the rest is sold at subsidized prices.

As of August 2024 electricity generation required 72% of the total natural gas demand of Tunisia with 95% of electricity generated via natural gas.

== Electrical sector and renewable energies ==
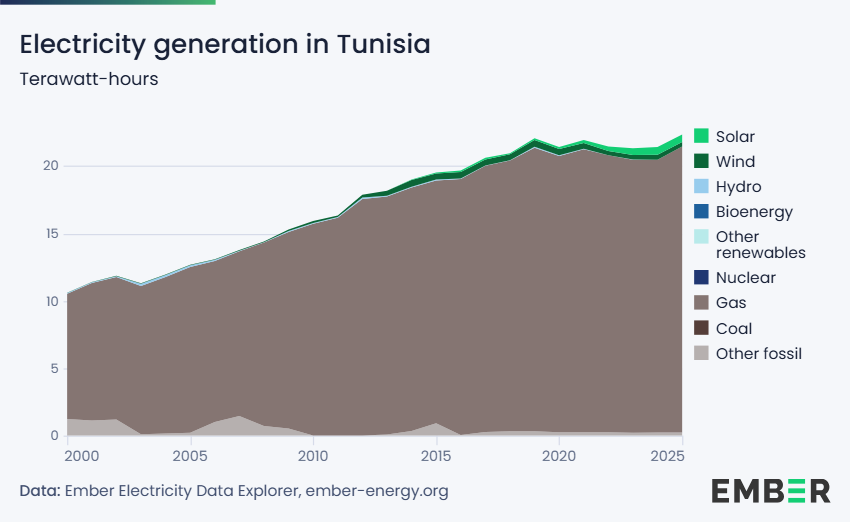
Electricity generation in Tunisia in terawatt-hours

The International Energy Agency reports for 2014 an electricity production of 19 TWh, compared to 10.5 TWh in the year 2000. The Tunisian Company of Electricity and Gas (STEG), a public company, ensures the three quarters of production. The network operates at 50 Hertz and the voltage at the domestic level is 230 Volts.

Virtually all Tunisian electricity (18 TWh) is produced by thermal power plants burning natural gas, the largest of which is in Sousse. Wind energy is the second largest source of electricity in the country; a capacity of 305 MW has been installed in a few years.

STEG has been subsidizing consumer electricity prices since 2004 (due to 2000s energy crisis and weak national currency). As of 2012, average retail prices were almost twice lower than average production costs, and state energy subsidies totalled to 20% of public budget and 9% of the GDP. Starting from 2014, government had to decrease the amount of subsidies.

The British company TuNur Ltd proposed a major project in solar energy in 2010s, which would consist in building in stages 4,500 MW of thermodynamic solar power plants in southern Tunisia, and export electricity to Malta first, then Italy and finally France. First utility-scale photovoltaic plant (10 MW, in Tozeur) was commissioned in 2019 on German money.

Tunisia aims to generate 30% of its electricity from renewable sources by 2030. The country currently gets only 3% to 6% of its electricity from renewable sources, mostly from wind and hydro. Solar energy capacity is at 35 megawatts (MW).

In addition to wind and hydro, the Tunisian government plans to use biogas to produce renewable energy. Biogas are the mixture of gases produced by the breakdown of organic matter anaerobically. The production of biogas comes from raw materials like cow waste (manure), sewage, and other sources of biological wastes. Like many developing countries, Tunisia had a problem with their disposal of solid wastes. This is in terms of efficiently transporting it, disposing it, or potentially using it. Based on studies completed between 2015 and 2020 in twenty-four provinces, Tunisia has issues with efficient energy use and total energy production. This creates the overlap for biogas to take on some level of energy production in Tunisia's continued green wave of energy production.

In 2016, Tunisia emitted 29 Mega tons of carbon dioxide equivalent (MtCO₂e) in greenhouse gasses. The country aims to reduce its carbon intensity by 13% in 2030, compared to 2010 levels.

The Tunisian government has looked at the economic impact of renewable energies and found that different analyses with different partners across the globe show an increasing job growth with the continued adoption of renewable energy sources. One of these analyses presented relationships down to a unit of power, MWh versus unemployment/employment.

Another study corroborated by Tunisian sources shows the benefits of further community outreach by way of CSSs (Civil society), civil society stakeholders. These organizations would be able to function through schools to teach students about renewable energies resulting in their widespread adoption in the future. The Tunisian government also plans to educate adults about renewable energy by way of a CSS particularly in rural areas where educational standards may be behind their urban counterparts.

== Nuclear ==
Tunisia was evaluating the possibility of building a 600 MWe nuclear plant. In December 2006, a cooperation agreement on peaceful use of nuclear energy was signed with France, focused on nuclear power and desalination. It was supposed to account for 20% of Tunisia's power needs.

In June 2015, Tunisia signed a MOU with Russia. Rosatom said "For the first time in the history of Russian-Tunisian relations, this document has laid the legal foundation for interaction between Russia and Tunisia in nuclear energy, covering a broad range of topics," Rostom said these include : support in the development of nuclear energy infrastructure in Tunisia; fundamental and applied research; the design, construction and operation of nuclear power plants and research reactors; the production and use of radioisotopes in industry, medicine and agriculture; radioactive waste management; the training of specialists in nuclear physics and nuclear energy.

The plan is for nuclear power to replace gas. Nuclear could generate 13% of power by 2023, under 2015 projections.

== See also ==
- Nawara Development Project
