= El Mdou =

Town in Tunisia

El Mdou المدو
- Town
- El Mdou
- Interactive map of El Mdou
- Coordinates: 33°48′22″N 10°04′09″E
- Country: Tunisia
- Governorate: Gabès Governorate
- Time zone: UTC+1

El Mdou is a village in the south of Tunisia located eight kilometers west of Gabès and dependent on the governorate of Gabès. A regional road crosses it and connects it to Gabès and Matmata, in particular through a bus line. One road goes towards El Hamma and another towards Limaya. The village is home to a school, a mosque and an Antenna to cover the Gabès region.

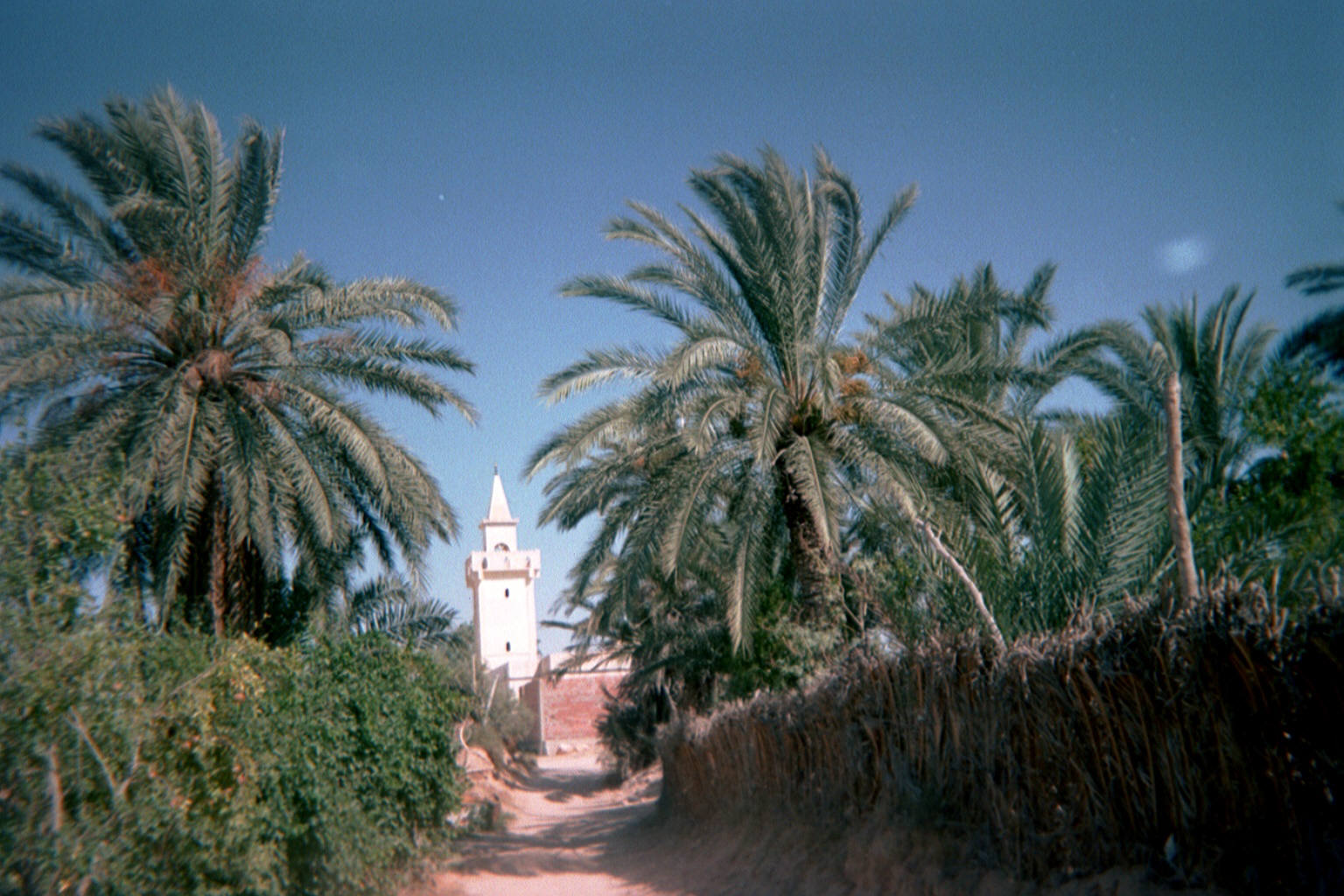
View of the mosque of El Mdou

== See also ==
- Gabés
