= Sidi Daoud Wind Farm =

Wind farm in Tunisia

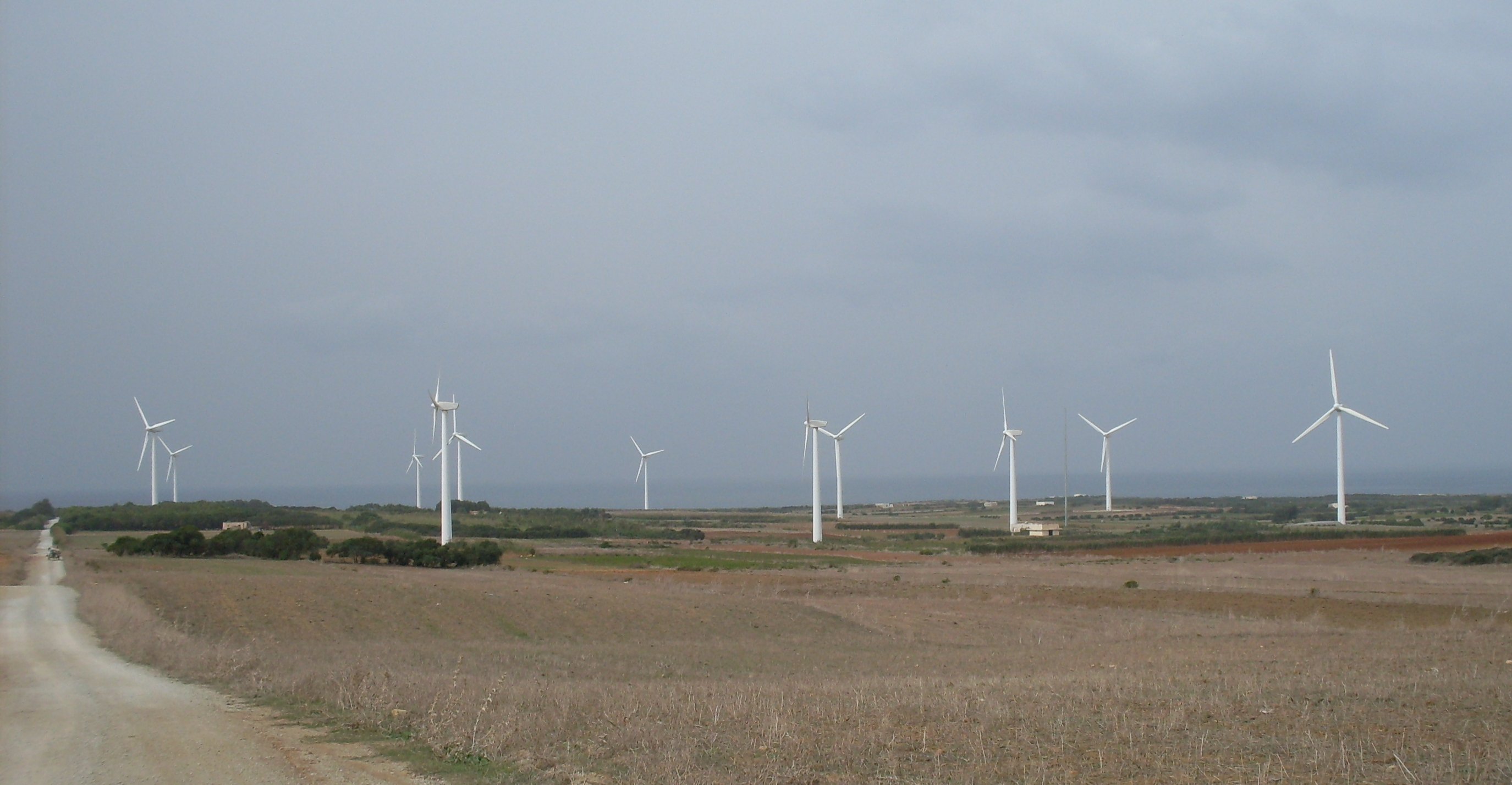
- Country: Tunisia
- Location: Sidi Daoud
- Coordinates: 37°01′53″N 10°55′41″E
- Status: Operational
- Commission date: 2000
- Construction cost: 54 million euros
- Owner: Tunisian Company of Electricity and Gas
- Operator: Tunisian Company of Electricity and Gas

External links
- Commons: Related media on Commons

Sidi Daoud Wind Farm is a wind farm in Tunisia, located near the village of Sidi Daoud, 50 km from Tunis. Built on a fairly windy coastline of the northern tip of the Cape Bon, it was commissioned by the Tunisian Company of Electricity and Gas. The farm capacity is 45 MW.

The project cost is estimated to 54 million euros. It has been funded by the Global Environment Facility and the United Nations Development Program. It is part of a Tunisian national policy to promote renewable energy.
