= Zarat, Tunisia =

Zarat
- Commune and town
- Location within Tunisia
- Coordinates: 33°40′04″N 10°21′02″E
- Country: Tunisia
- Governorate: Gabès Governorate

Population (2004)
  - Total: 5,205
- Time zone: UTC+1 (CET)

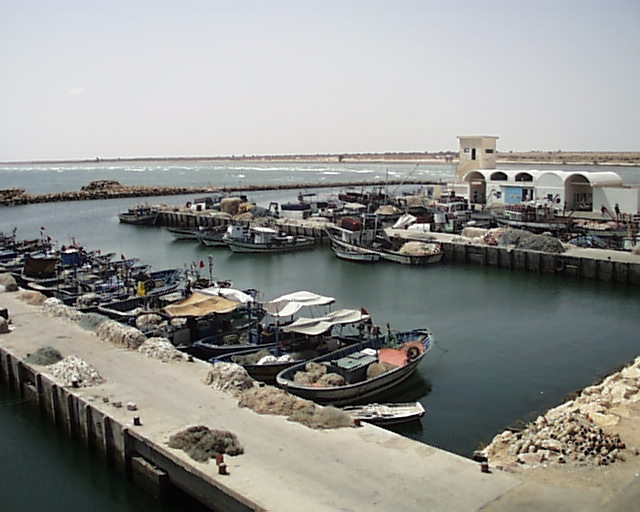
A dock in Zarat.

Zarat (Arabic: الزرات Az Zar'at) is a town and commune in the Gabès Governorate, Tunisia. As of 2004 it had a population of 5,205.

== See also ==
- Zraoua
- Métouia
- List of cities in Tunisia
