= Mareth Museum =

Museum in Mareth, Tunisia

Coordinates: 33.6178°N 10.2861°E

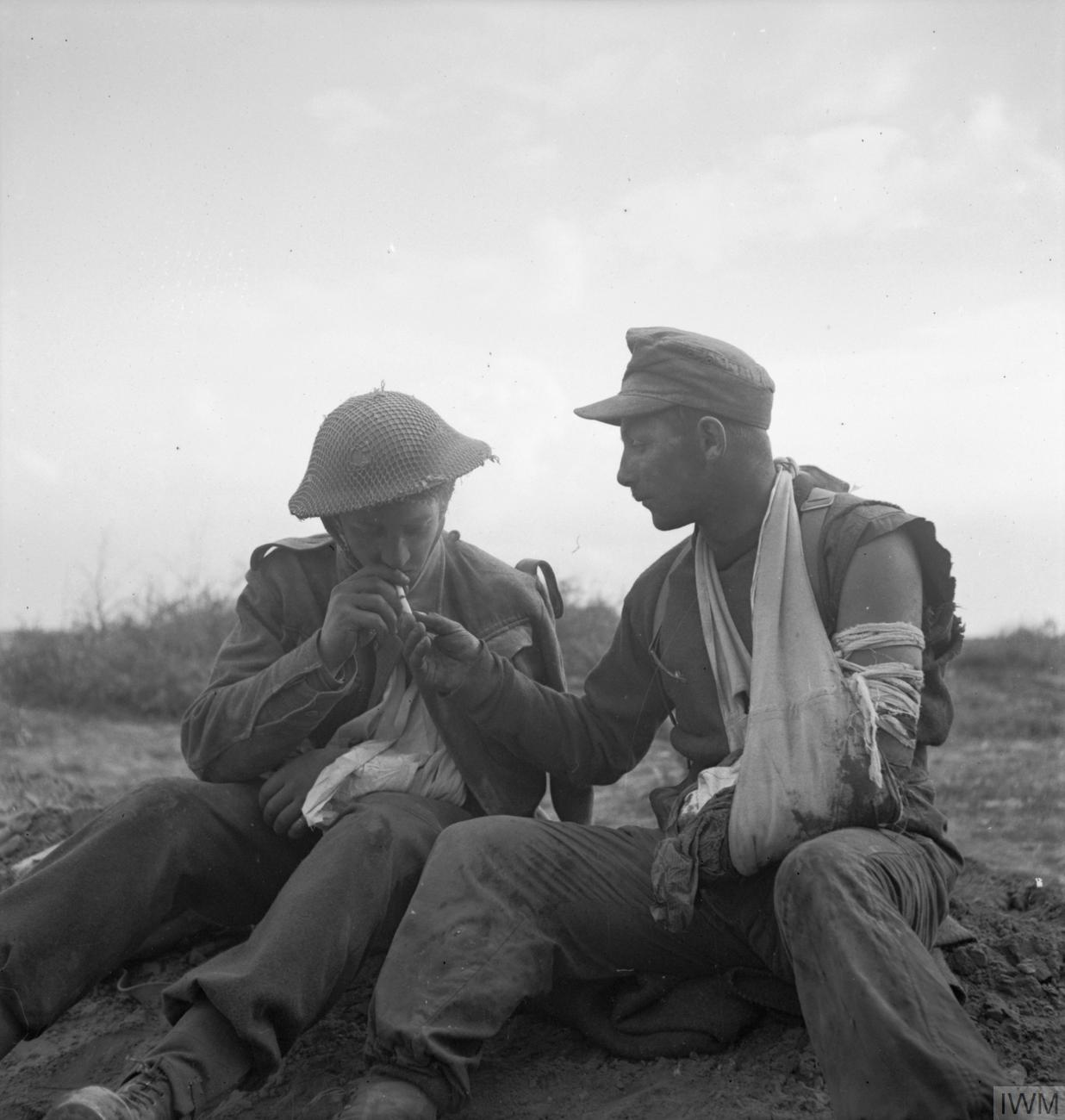
A wounded British Infantry soldier shares a cigarette with a wounded German prisoner during the Mareth line battle, 22–24 March 1943

Mareth museum is a military museum, in Mareth. Located between Gabes and Medenine, the Mareth line museum deals with the Second World War history. In March 1943, Rommel used this bunkered line to resist Montgomery's Eighth Army advance. The battle of the Mareth Line ensued. The Museum is built on a hill overlooking the Wadi Zigzaou, near several casemates (military pillboxes) which were strongpoints of the defensive line. Command posts, anti-tank and anti-aircraft guns are displayed outside the museum.
