= Nouvelle Matmata =

Nouvelle Matmata مطماطة الجديدة New Matmata
- Village and or town
- Location within Tunisia
- Coordinates: 33.63°N 10.06°E
- Country: Tunisia
- Governorate: Gabès Governorate

Population (2004)
  - Total: 6,642
- Time zone: UTC+1 (CET)

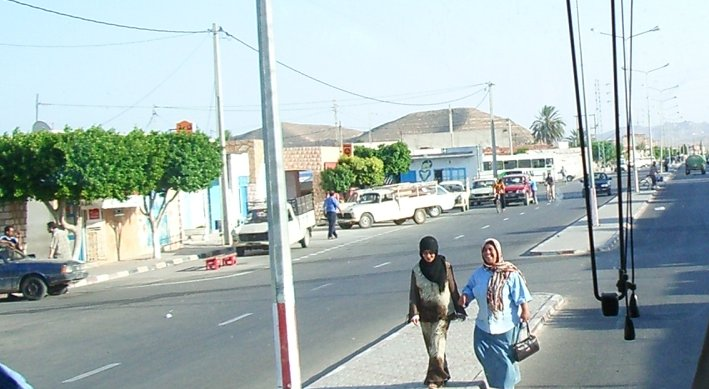

Nouvelle Matmata (Arabic: مطماطة الجديدة Maṭmāṭah al-Jadīdah) is a town and or village in the Gabès Governorate, Tunisia. As of 2004 it had a population of 6,642.

== See also ==
- Matmata
- List of cities in Tunisia
