= Zraoua =

Tunisian village in the delegation of Matmata

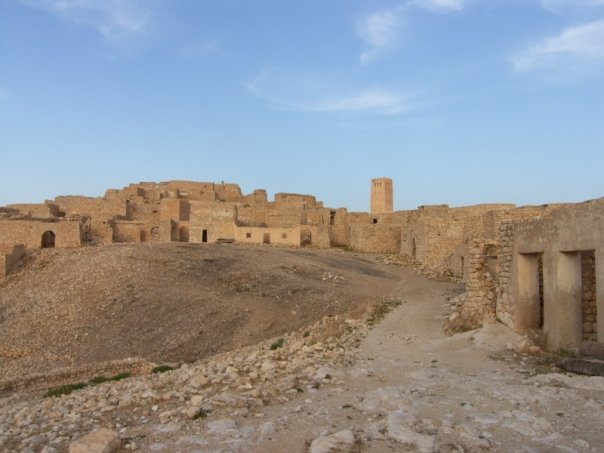

- Location within Tunisia
- Coordinates: 33°34′26″N 9°49′26″E
- Country: Tunisia
- Governorate: Gabès
- Delegation: Matmata

Zraoua is a Tunisian village in the delegation of Matmata. The original name in Amazigh language is Azro. Beside the Berber tribes, there was installation of the Arab tribes of Ouled Abdallah and Ouled Hlel from Enfidha and Ouled Aïssa from the tribe of Hmamma.

== See also ==
- Zrawa language
