= Elmed =

Elmed may refer to:

- Kingdom of Elfed, a kingdom and area in modern Northern England, also spelled Elmet
- ELMED interconnector, a planned power transmission cable
