= Battle of Enfidaville =

1943 WWII battle in Tunisia

- Part of Tunisian campaign of World War II
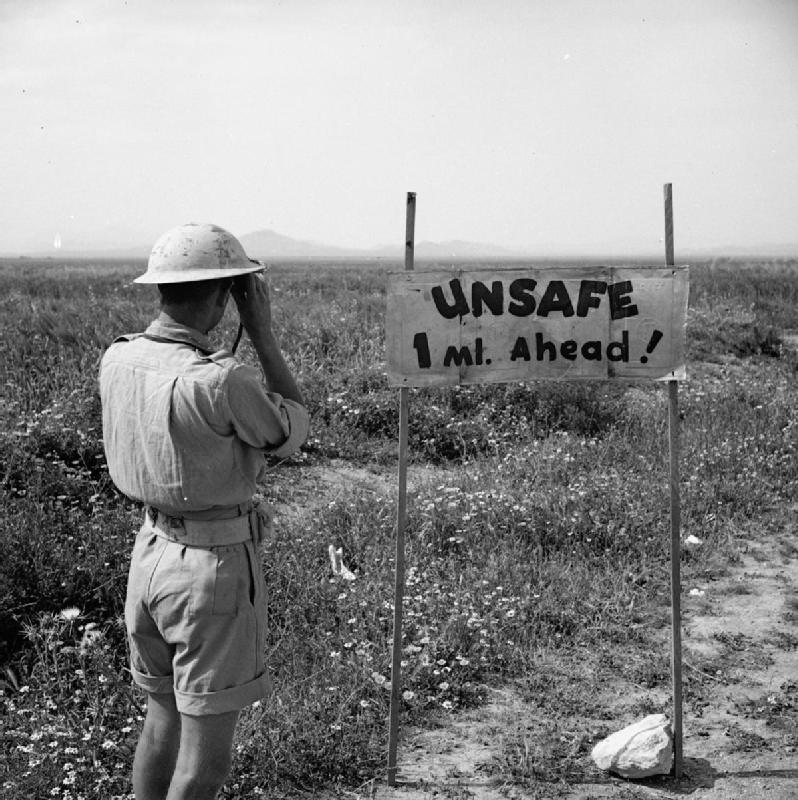
- British Eighth Army at Enfidaville in the Tunisian campaign
Date	19–21 April 1943
Location	Enfidaville Airfield, Africa 36°08′04.42″N 010°25′51.19″E
Result	Inconclusive and See § Aftermath

Belligerents
United Kingdom; British India; New Zealand	Italy; Germany

Commanders and leaders
(United Kingdom) Bernard Montgomery (United Kingdom) Harold Alexander	(Kingdom of Italy) Giovanni Messe (Nazi Germany) Fritz Bayerlein

Casualties and losses
1,100	Unknown; 1,500 prisoners

The Battle of Enfidaville (April 1943), also known as Operation Oration, was the last major action of the British Eighth Army in the North African campaign of World War II. After stout resistance from the Italian First Army in the mountains around Enfidaville, the British captured the town and captured its inland area, but were unable to breakthrough. Axis counterattacks were launched but these were repelled.

== Background ==
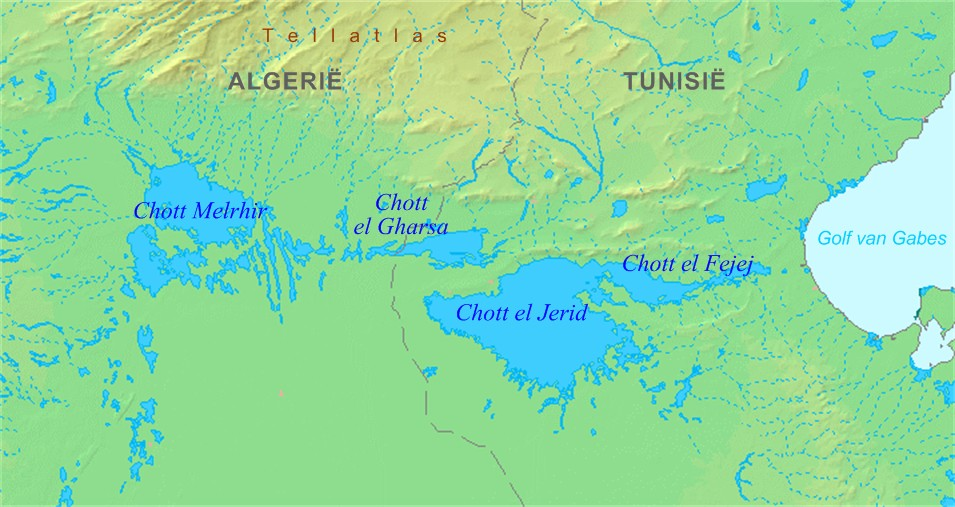
Chott el Djerid area.

The Eighth Army, under General Bernard Montgomery had advanced through Oudref and reached Wadi Akarit on 30 March. Three divisions were chosen for the initial assault: 51st (Highland) Infantry Division on the right, 50th (Northumbrian) Infantry Division in the centre and the 4th Indian Infantry Division on the left.

The assault took place on the 6 April, centered on the Gabès Gap, north of the towns of Gabès and El Hamma, a passage between the sea and impassable salt marshes. The 51st Highland breached the defences and held a bridgehead, allowing the passage of their main force to roll up the Axis defences. After several determined counter-attacks, the Axis forces withdrew, with British forces in pursuit.

Meanwhile U.S. II Corps under Lieutenant General George Patton following their attack at El Guettar, raced down the now abandoned El Guettar-Gabès road, where it met the lead elements of the 8th Army at 17:00. With the last Axis line of defense in the south of Tunisia broken, the remaining forces made a run to join the other Axis forces in the north. Eight army forces pursued Axis forces toward Tunis.

Messe reported the situation to Hans-Jürgen von Arnim; Albert Kesselring - Arnim ordered a retreat to the Enfidaville position, about 150 miles (240 km) to the north. The 2nd New Zealand Division and 1st Armoured Division began a pursuit across the coastal plain, which changed from semi-desert to olive groves which offered opportunities for ambush. There was little resistance until close to Enfidaville and about 6,000 prisoners were taken.

On 10 April, the capture of Sfax was completed. X corps captured the city of Sousse on 12 April and moved to within a few miles of Enfidaville by 13 April.

=== Prelude ===
The line between Sousse and Enfidaville was considered to be an important point of defense for the Axis in North Africa. The eastern terminus of the Axis "final defensive line," which ran from the northwestern part of the country through Pont Du Fahs, Medjez el Bab, Sedjenane, has been designated east of Enfidaville. Montgomery was informed that while the Eighth Army was holding, the British First Army would lead all Allied forces during the offensive against Tunis. The offensive against Tunis, later named Operation Vulcan would occur mainly in the more wide‐open areas of land to the west of the city. The purpose of the Eighth Army was to keep the Axis occupied at Enfidaville so that the British First Army would have the opportunity to defeat them.

It was envisioned that the 4th Indian Division and the 2nd New Zealand Division would initiate a breakthrough and then move to the east after breaching the Axis defences, in order to isolate Axis forces by reaching the coastline behind their lines. The 50th (Northumbrian) Division was assigned to provide security of the coastal flank to the right side of these two divisional formations; the left flank was protected by the 7th Armoured Division.

== Battle ==
The night of 19/20 April saw the Axis defences receive an overwhelming bombardment from both air and artillery forces, followed by a ground attack. As a result of this overwhelming firepower, many of the Italian units were forced to retreat from areas on their main defensive line. After fierce fighting for its control, Enfidaville was eventually captured by the 50th Division. 151 Brigade sent out patrols to the coastal area, where the divisional artillery gave harassing fire to Axis transport using the coast road.

Axis troops were still occupying the high ground further inland, making progress more difficult for both the 4th Indian and 2nd New Zealand Divisions.

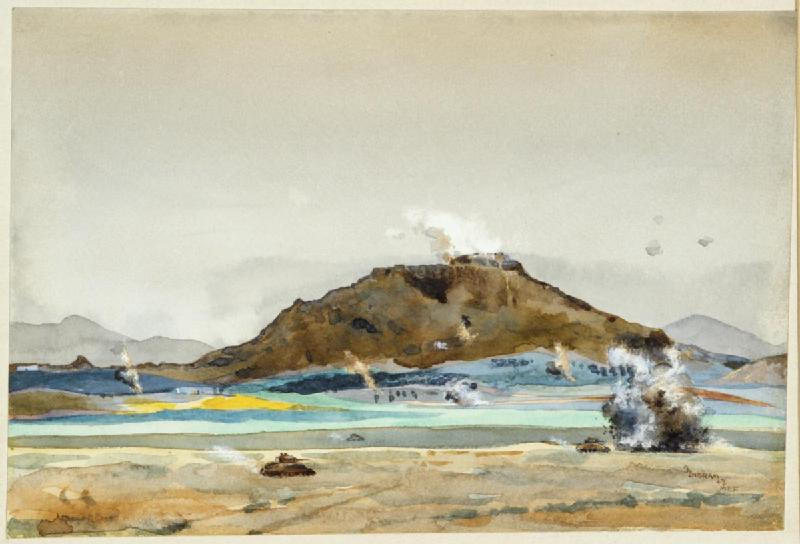
Takrouna - Two miles West of Enfidaville. Painting by A J Ingram.

New Zealand forces prepared for an assault on Takrouna, then held by the Italian 66th regiment, elements of Paratroopers Division "Folgore", elements of Italian Granatieri and one German company. At dawn on 20 April, Lance-sergeant Haane Te Rauawa Manahi led a platoon on an attack up the hill, and successfully overran the Italian defenses. Manahi then left to locate reinforcements, returning with a section of C Company and another platoon, successfully resisting an Axis counterattack.

By the end of the first day it was clear a breakthrough had not been achieved. General Fritz Bayerlein, the commander of the German units within 1st Italian Army ordered counter attacks to stem the allied advanced, and on 20/21st April this was implemented. The 16th "Pistoia" launched several counter attacks towards Enfidaville but were beaten back. The hill at Takrouna was however retaken and the New Zealanders, in turn launched another attack in the afternoon and, with artillery support, retook first the ledge and then the village on the summit, taking 300 prisoners.

Elsewhere Axis attempts to retake the lost ground were repelled with severe losses on both sides. Despite this, the British renewed their attack and 4th Indian Division were able take to sections of Djebel Garci, located approximately twelve miles from the coast. The position was held against Axis counter attacks, but 4th Indian held on to this part of the Djebel. Most of the gains made by the 50th Division took place along the coastline, before being halted by heavy resistance. The divisional Commander Sidney Kirkman was ordered to pull the division out of the line.

By this time Montgomery learned that the Axis position in Africa was hopeless through ULTRA intelligence. As a result he ordered Oration to be terminated late on 21 April as further casualties in his opinion were not worth it.

== Aftermath ==
With this new intelligence, Montgomery authorised local minor attacks in order to keep the pressure on Axis forces in front of the Eighth Army while a new attack - operation Vulcan was to take place very soon after Oration. 50th Division was replaced by the inexperienced 56th (London) Division.

Operation Oration was a mixed success, Endifavile, Takrouna, large sections of the coast and part of the inland had been secured. A breakthrough however hadn't been achieved and the cost had been some 1,100 troops. Some 500 from 4th Indian division and 600 from the 1st New Zealand Division had been casualties. German and Italian losses were also heavy, but these were not able to be replaced. In addition some 1,500 (mostly Italian) had been captured.

The northward advance of Eighth Army had "pinched out" US II Corps' eastward facing front line, allowing the corps to be withdrawn and switched to the northern end of the Allied front. This was achieved with great success and speed without the Axis knowing. This move was fully completed by 24 April.

Operation Vulcan commenced the day after Oration had terminated. A renewed effort on the coast was to begin on 29 April. The responsibility for keeping the left flank of Montgomery was to fall on the 2nd New Zealand Division and the 201st Guards Brigade, while the main coastal assault was to be led by the 4th Indian Division. The attack went in - capturing Djebel Terhouna, a strategic high ground five miles north of Enfidaville.

In the event of any success, the armoured formations were to advance eastward to Hammamet. The attack was cancelled however due to 56th Division failure to advance under artileey fire.

Operation Strike was the last ground attack by the Allied forces of the First Army against the Italian and German forces in Tunis, Cape Bon and Bizerte, the last Axis bridgeheads in North Africa, during the Tunisian campaign of the Second World War. The offensive was launched only a week after the end of 'Vulcan', in which the Axis forces had been severely weakened and hemmed in against the coast, but the allies were unable to break out.
