= Amor Ben Salem =

Tunisian Arabic writer

- عمر بن سالم
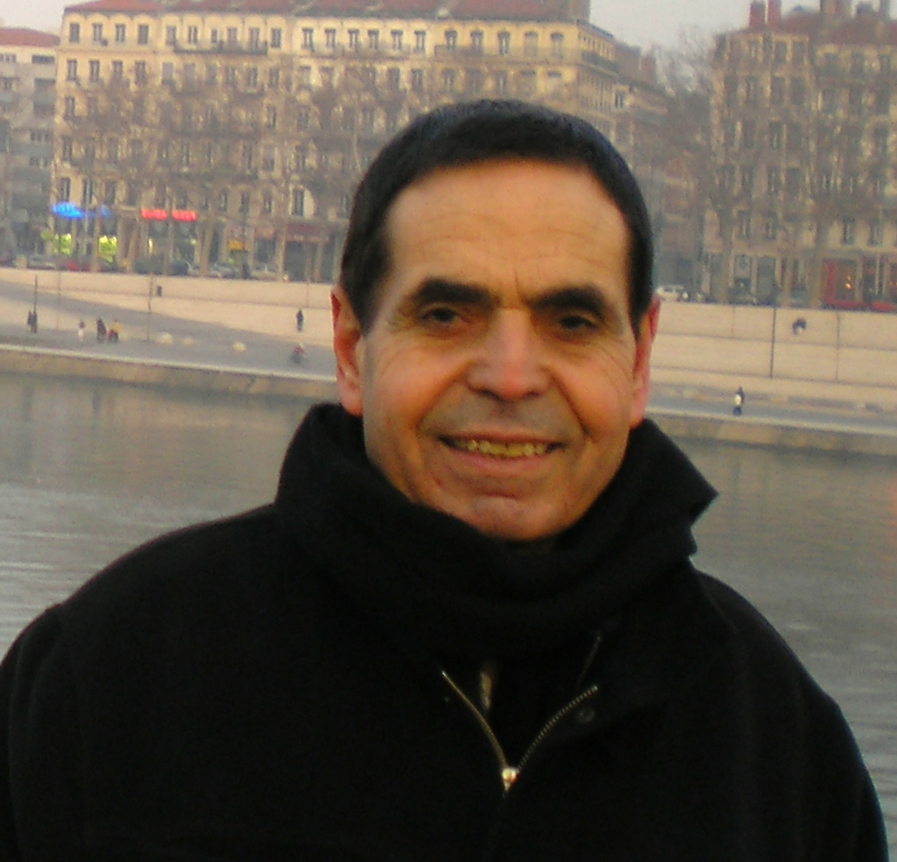
- Born: Amor Ben Salem; 6 August 1932 (age 94); Métouia, Tunisia
- Occupation: Writer
- Writing career
- Language: Arabic
- Notable works: An Oasis Without Shadow, waha bila thil (Arabic: واحّة بلا ظلّ,AbouJahl Addahhas (Arabic: أبو جهل الدّهّاس

Amor Ben Salem (Tunisian Arabic: عمر بن سالم) is a Tunisian Arabic writer.

== Biography ==
Amor Ben Salem was born in the village of Métouia in the southeastern province of Gabes in Tunisia where he attended his primary education and secondary education in Gabes. He obtained a diploma in philosophy from Tunis in 1957 after which he flew to Cairo to attend journalism courses at the University of Cairo from 1958 to 1959. He then flew to Beirut to commence his higher education at the High Teachers Institution (Lebanese University), obtaining his bachelor's and master's degrees in the Arabic language and literature in 1960. Upon his return to Tunisia, he had taught in several high schools until 1965, the same year in which he traveled to France to join the University of Paris III: Sorbonne Nouvelle to commence his doctorate degree in Arabic grammar, which he completed in 1968 and returned to Tunisia. Amor Ben Salem pursued his interest in teaching by joining the High Teachers Institute in Tunis, and later became a full-time professor at the Social and Economic Research and Studies Centre (CERES) from 1972. There, he established and supervised a department devoted to literary research, which remained active even after his retirement in October 1993.

From his youth onward, Ben Salem was also a dedicated writer and poet, producing prose in both literary and dialect Arabic. He published numerous short stories, novels, plays, children’s works, and critical studies. In addition, he compiled a biographical dictionary of Tunisian writers and edited anthologies of Tunisian literature.

== Bibliography ==
- "Dīwān ibn Durayd : al-mutawaffá fī 321h-933 /Dirāsah wa-taḥqīq"(Arabic: ديوان ابن دريد), Tūnus, al-Dār al-Tūnsīyah lil-Nashr, 1973. OCLC 23487994 (Achieve effects Ibn Duraid poetry and prose.)
- "Qābādū 1815–1871: ḥayātuhu wa-āṯāruhu wa-tafkīruhu al-islāḥī " (Arabic: قابادو :1815–1871: حياته وآثاره وتفكيره الإصلاحي), Al-Ǧāmiʿaẗ al-tūnisiyyaẗ, Markaz al-Dirāsāt wa-al-abḥāṯ al-iqtiṣādiyyaẗ wa-al-iǧtimāʿiyyaẗ, Tūnis 1975.(FRBNF|41159577z)(Studies)
- An Oasis Without Shadow, "Wāḥaẗ bilā ẓill", (Arabic: واحّة بلا ظلّ) (novel) Safaa publishing, Tunis, 1979. Translated to Russian.
- The Day of the Lat, "yaom al-lat", (Arabic: يوم اللاّت) (play), The Arab Writers Union, Damascus, 1979.
- The Circle of Suffocation, "dairat alekhtinaq", (Arabic: دائرة الاختناق) (novel), Safaa publishing, Tunis, 1984. Translated to Polish.
- Astarte, "Ištārūt" (Arabic: عشتاروت) (play), Al-Janoub publishing, Tunis, 1984. Translated to French.
- "AbouJahl Addahhas" (Arabic: أبو جهل الدّهّاس) (novel), Tunisian Publishing House, 1984. Translated to French « Le Patriarche ». I.C.A.R.E., Paris 1993. ISBN 2-907332-11-2.
- The Lion and the Statue, "Al-asad wa-al-timṯāl ", (Arabic: الأسد والتّمثال) (novel), Tunisian Publishing House, Tunis, 1991.ISBN 9973-12-084-1
- "Alī al-Ġurāb : ḥayātuhu wa adabuhu "(Arabic: علي الغراب حياته وأدبه), Tunis : Al-Maṭbaʻaẗ al-ʻAṣriyyaẗ, 1987.OCLC 496223392 (Studies and texts of Alī al-Ġurāb).
- Layla and the Sultan, "Layla wassultan", (Arabic: ليلى و السّلطان) (play), Writers Union, Tunis, 1995.
- The Billion, "Al milyār", (Arabic: المليار) (short stories), Arabian Book House, Tunis, 1995.ISBN 9973-10-142-1
- Ancient Times Testament, "Asfār al-ʿahd al-ġābir", (Arabic: أسفار العهد الغابر) (play), Dār Saḥar li-l-našr, Tunis, 1995.ISBN 9973-763-42-4
- Of Dessert and Sea, "Sahri Bahri", (Arabic: صحري بحري) (novel), Dār Saḥar li-l-našr, Tunis, 1995.ISBN 9973-763-64-5 Translated to Italian "Di palo in frasca", Centre National de Traduction, Tunis 2013.ISBN 978-9973-084-94-1
- Sessions of Day and Night, "Maqāmāt al-layl wa-al-nahār min al-ǧabal al-aḥmar ilá al-manār", (Arabic: مقامات اللّيل و النّهار من الجبل الأحمر إلى المنار) (short stories), Dār Saḥar li-l-našr, Tunis, 1995.ISBN 9973-28-018-0
- Marwan in the Land of the Djinn, "Marwan fi bilad ejjan", (Arabic: مروان في بلاد الجان) (novel), Dār Saḥar li-l-našr, Tunis, 2010.ISBN 978-9973-28-292-7
- Stories of Mother Elsalha, "Hikayat ommi elsalha", (Arabic: حكايات أمّي الصّالحة) (children stories), Dār Saḥar li-l-našr, Tunis, 2011.
- Scents and Flavours, "to'oum wa rawa'eh", (Arabic: طعوم و روائح) (short stories), Dār Saḥar li-l-našr, Tunis, 2012.ISBN 978-9973-28-347-4
- Metouian Mythology, "asateer matwiya", (Arabic: أساطير مطوية) (short stories), Dār Saḥar li-l-našr, Tunis, 2012.ISBN 978-9973-28-365-8

== Translations ==
- (in Arabic) Al-bahr al-mutawassit (Arabic: البحر الأبيض المتوسّط), éd. Alif, Tunis, 1990 ISBN 9973-716-48-5
  —Arabic translation works La Méditerranée. L'espace et l'histoire et La Méditerranée. Les hommes et l'héritage, both under the direction of Fernand Braudel

== Works ==
- The novel "Wāḥaẗ bilā ẓill", (Arabic: واحّة بلا ظلّ) namely An Oasis Without Shadow, was published in 1979 after ten years of censorship in Tunisia. This novel deals with two main subjects: land reform process with collective farming in Tunisia in the 1970s and migration of most young Tunisians to France, particularly from the town of Métouia and its oasis. The subject of emigration is also discussed in the novel "AbouJahl Addahhas".
- "AbouJahl Addahhas", (Arabic: أبو جهل الدّهّاس) through the complex relationships within migrant families from southern Tunisia who are settled in Lyon while their families remained in Tunisia. Through several storylines, the novel provides perspectives of immigrant workers in France and the lives of their families in the village.
- In the novel "Dairat al-ekhtinaq", (Arabic: دائرة الاختناق) or The Circle of Suffocation Amor Ben Salem fictionalizes the events that took place in Tunisia the Black Thursday which oppose on 26 January 1978 the Tunisian government to the Tunisian General Labour Union and leads to a general strike with severe repression and imprisonment of trade unionists.
- In "Al-asad wa-al-timṯāl, (Arabic: الأسد والتّمثال) The Lion and the Statue, the author narrates through anthropomorphic animals in line with the classical Arabic book Kalila wa Dimna (translation of Panchatantra) address the behavior of Arab leaders by comparing then to gods surrounded by a courtyard and capable of anything to maintain power.
- Similarly, in the drama, "Ištārūt", (Arabic: عشتاروت) (inspired by the symbolic Phoenician mythology Astarte) depicts themes of absolute power and the downfall of a tyrant. Thus, Astarte, normally protecting the sovereign Baʿal and his dynasty, revolted and embodies the freedom of the oppressed fighting against the governing God. Ben Salem dedicated this play to "all peoples of the third world without exception."
- His collection of short stories, "Sessions of Day and Night", "Maqāmāt al-layl wa-al-nahār min al-ǧabal al-aḥmar ila al-manār", (Arabic: مقامات اللّيل و النّهار من الجبل الأحمر إلى المنار) published in the form of Maqamat (Arabic: مقامات), which is an original Arabic literary genre of rhymed prose. Ben Salem thematically narrates stories of social inequality in modern Tunisian society, symbolized by animals and plants living in two districts of Tunis: a poor district called "Al-Jabal Al-Ahmar" and the area of the upper class called "Al-Manar".
- Of Desert and Sea, (Arabic: صحري بحري) is a novel that is mainly social critique of the different facets of the life of a fortunate and wealthy Sheikh – religious scholar – of the Zaitouna University, in the 1930s. The narrative describes the actions and behaviors of one of these bourgeois religious symbols who monopolized high positions of power and exercised relentless support for the existing regimes at the time, regardless of their oppression. The story is a libel of the traditions of this class of men and their imitation of foreigners; especially the ex-colonisers, the French and the Italians, in clothing as in behaviour as well as their immersion in all kinds of immoral profligacy and dissipation.
- In his latest novel, Marwan in the Land of the Djinn, "Marwan fi bilad ejjan", (Arabic: مروان في بلاد الجان), the author takes the reader to a voyage into parallel universe where a superpower raids weaker nations, exploits their land and deteriorates their environment, while describing the resistance of the oppressed people, their struggle against colonization and the protection of their living environment. Ben Salem receives the "special mention" prize of Comar gold 2010 for this last novel.
- Scents and Flavours, (Arabic: طعوم و روائح), is a group of short stories based on a variety of discourse and sequential series of inspiration from elements of recit that deal with flavours and scents that have held on to the memory of those who relay the stories as a result of surrounding circumstances or due to their stances and positions. The characters in this narrative display contrasting origins and orientations, differing education and environments as they deal with various flavours and scents in their lives from their individual perspectives, free from all social and psychological pressures and restrictions imposed by societal values. These stories, in all their diversity of subjects, time and space, stem from the source of memory, and pour into the valley of nostalgia
- In Metouian Mythology, (Arabic: أساطير مطوية), the book relays a collection of short stories about the local mythology of a Tunisian oasis in the village of Métouia in the south-east of the country in which the protagonists' adventures and endeavours are inspired by the local culture and engraved in the people's memories. The stories also rebuild the geological constructs of the village's valleys and springs as well as the anthropological and cultural relationships that are connected to the inhabitants' diversified origins and ethnicities. Through these myths, the reader may contemplate the role that this oasis plays in creating harmony within the community in which it is found, reaching to the passing travellers and caravans whose paths cross the oasis.
