= Naceur El Gharbi =

Tunisian politician

Naceur El Gharbi was the Tunisian Minister of Social Affairs, Solidarity, and Tunisians Living Abroad under former President Zine El Abidine Ben Ali.

Naceur El Gharbi was born in Kairouan, Tunisia in 1949. He received a Masters in Public Law, and he is a graduate of the École nationale d'administration.

In 1974, he started his career in the Tunisian Ministry of Social Affairs. In 1988, he was appointed as Governor of Gabès. From 2000 to 2004, he was CEO of Pharmacie Centrale Tunisienne, and from 2004 to 2009, he was the CEO of the Tunisian Caisse Nationale d’Assurance-Maladie.

In January 2010, he was appointed as Minister of Social Affairs, Solidarity, and Tunisians Living Abroad under Ben Ali.
