= ELMED interconnector =

Subsea electricity transmission line

Location
- Country: Italy, Tunisia
- General direction: northeast–southwest
- From: Menzel Temime, Cape Bon, Tunisia
- Passes through: Strait of Sicily
- To: Partanna, Trapani, Sicily, Italy

Ownership information
- Partners: STEG; Terna Group

Construction information
- Expected: 2028

Technical information
- Type: Submarine cable
- Current type: HVDC
- Total length: 200 km (120 mi)
- Capacity: 600 MW
- DC voltage: 500 kV

The ELMED interconnector, also known as the Tunisia-Italy interconnector, is a planned 200 km, 600 MW high-voltage direct current submarine power cable between Italy and Tunisia.

== Route ==
The cable will run from the Partanna electrical substation in Trapani, Sicily in Italy to a newly built substation in Menzel Temime, Cape Bon in Tunisia with a maximum depth of 800 meters.

== Technical description ==
The undersea cable is 200 kilometers long and has a capacity of 600 MW. While the undersea cable is 200 kilometers, another 20 kilometers of cable will be underground. The entire project is expected to cost €850 million.

== Project participants ==
STEG and Terna Group started planning the project in 2003. The World Bank provided Tunisia with $268.4 million of financing in 2023.
