= Oudhref =

- Commune and town
- Location within Tunisia
- Coordinates: 33.99°N 9.97°E
- Country: Tunisia
- Governorate: Gabès Governorate

Population (2004)
  - Total: 9,058
- Time zone: UTC+1 (CET)

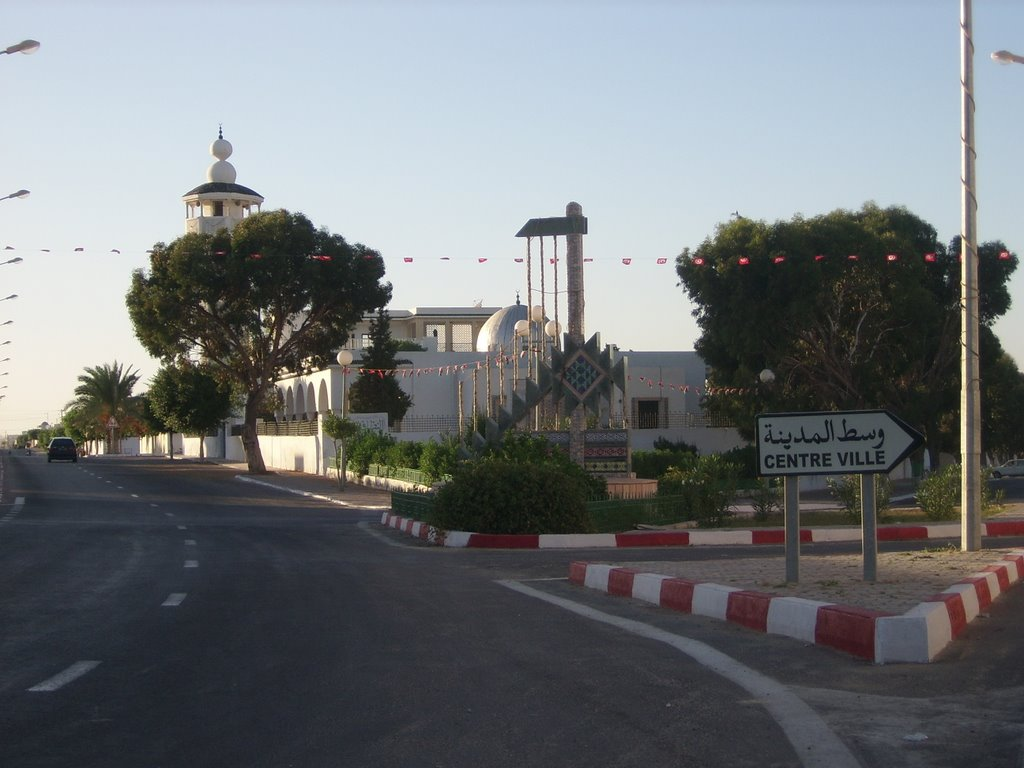
Entrance to the city of Oudref

Oudhref (Arabic: وذرف Waḏraf) is a town and commune in the Gabès Governorate, Tunisia. As of 2004 it had a population of 9,058.

The town is known for producing margoum, which is used to make Berber carpets.

== See also ==
- Chenini Nahal
- Métouia
- El Hamma
- List of cities in Tunisia
