= Oussama Romdhani =

Tunisian journalist and politician

Oussama Romdhani is the former Tunisian communications minister.

== Biography ==
Oussama Romdhani was born on December 15, 1956, in Metouia, Tunisia. He received a PhD in American Studies from Tunis University and was a Fulbright scholar at Georgetown University.

He started his career as a journalist for Agence Tunis Afrique Presse (TAP). From 1983 to 1987, he worked as press secretary in the Tunisian embassy of Washington, D.C., and from 1987 to 1990 as the head of the D.C. branch of the Agence Tunis Afrique Presse. From 1991 to 1994, he worked as head of the D.C. branch of the Agence Tunisienne de Communication Extérieure (ATCE) and additionally as a Tunisian diplomat to the United States from 1991 to 1995. From 1995 to 2009, he was the director of the ATCE, a government agency with a mission to promote Tunisia's image abroad, but was used extensively by Ben Ali to embellish himself, his family and his regime abroad. In 2009 he was appointed as communications minister. As such, he blamed satellite TV for promoting the veil.

In July 2012, Romdhani became a regular columnist with the Dubai-based Gulf News. In his op-ed pieces he discussed the "lessons of the Arab Spring". He also criticized the "cronyism" of the Ben Ali regime and other flawed policies which led to the popular uprising against the regime.

In 2017, he holds the position of editor-in-chief at The Arab Weekly.
