= Margoum =

Margoum or mergoum is a type of wool weaving used as a floor rug, with Maghrebis origins. It is distinguished from a kilim by the regma, woven patterns that decorate it.

== Fabrication ==
The artisanal creation of the margoum combines the traditional art of weaving with drawing on wool. The artisan prepares the wool and uses a loom and traditional tools; this craft, like many others, requires significant physical effort. Margoum products are highly valued by both Tunisians and tourists.

Margoum is made in the Tunisian regions of Gafsa, El Jem, Oudhref, and Kairouan. However, this craft was affected by a decrease in prices that occurred in the late 1980s.

== Photo gallery ==
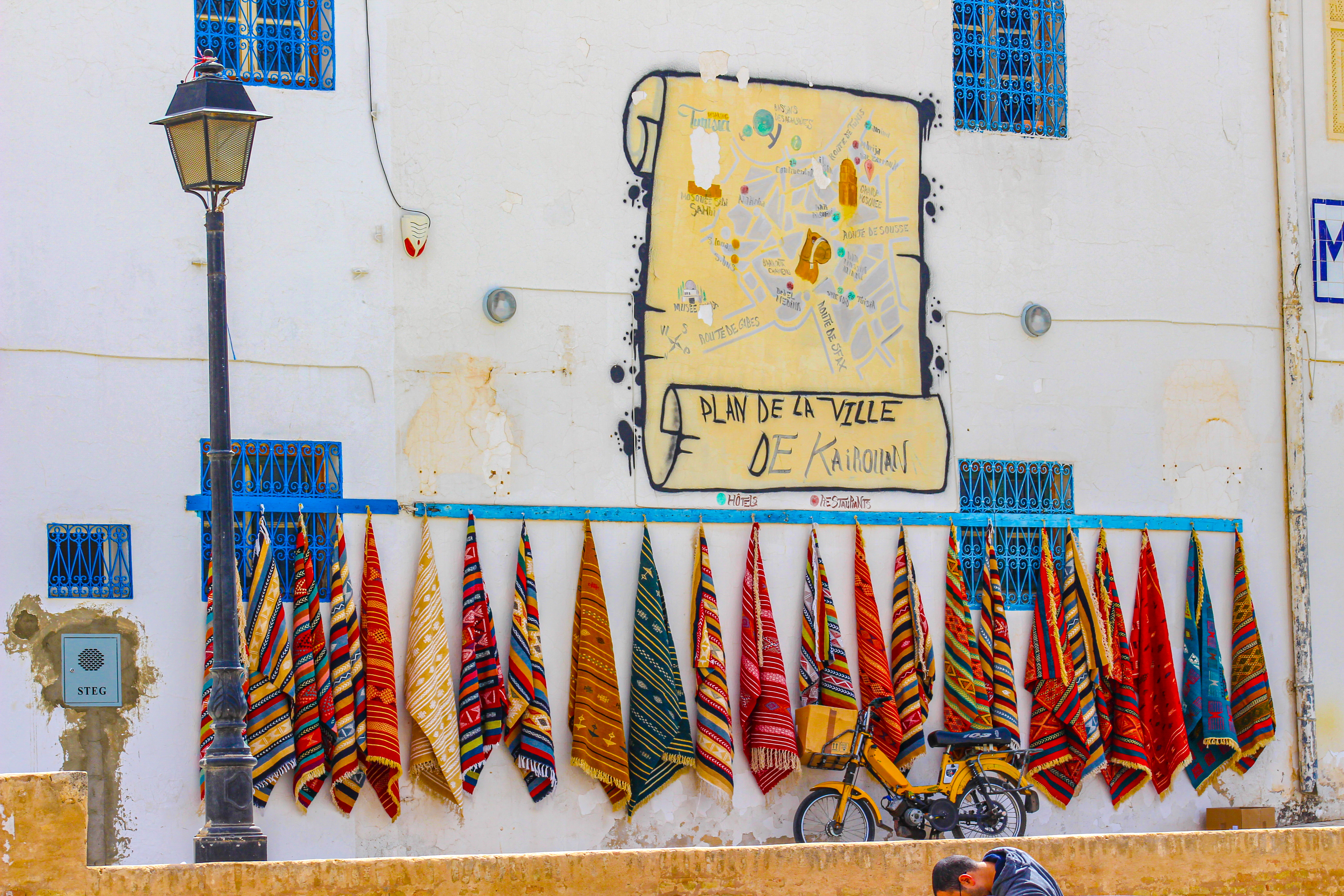

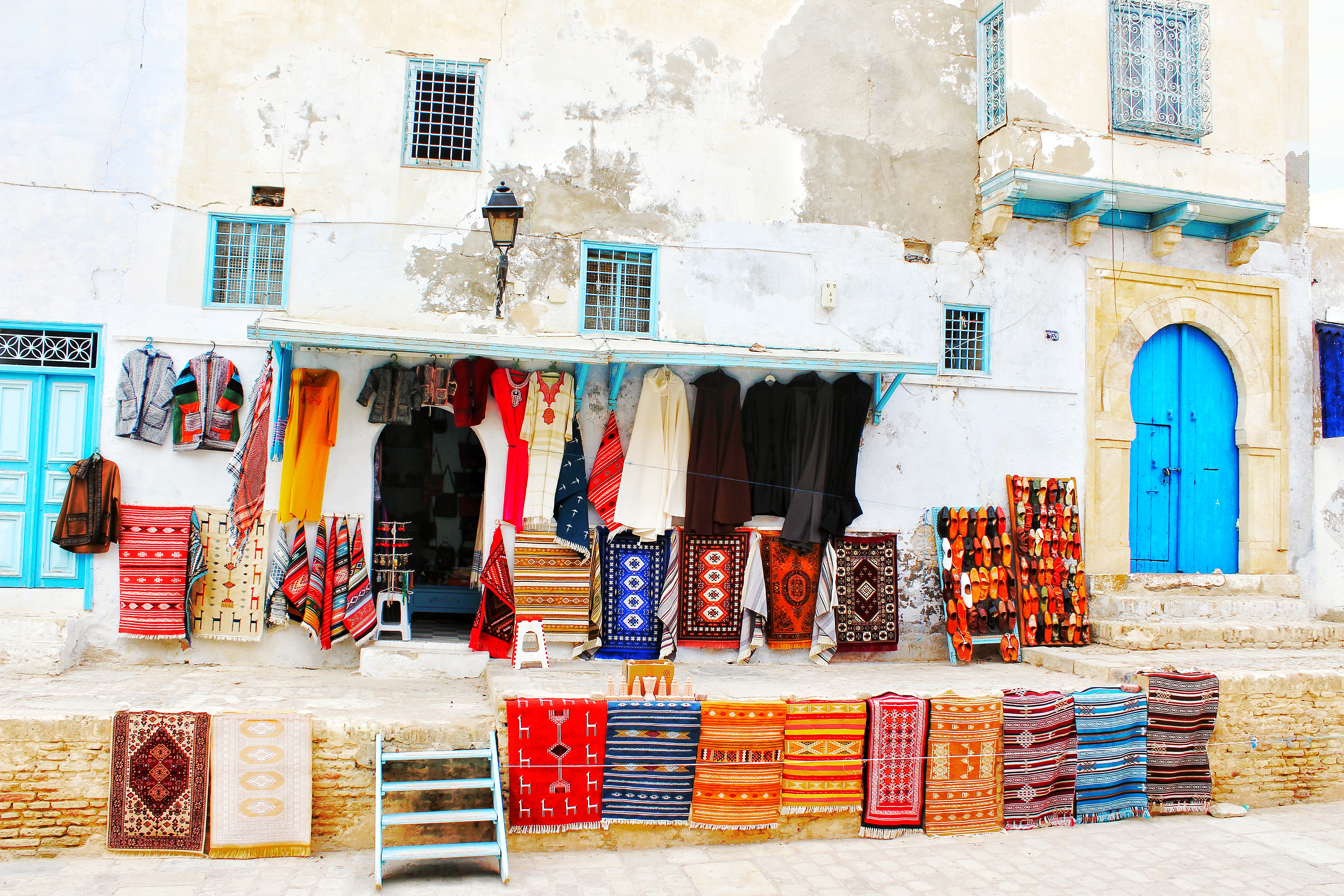

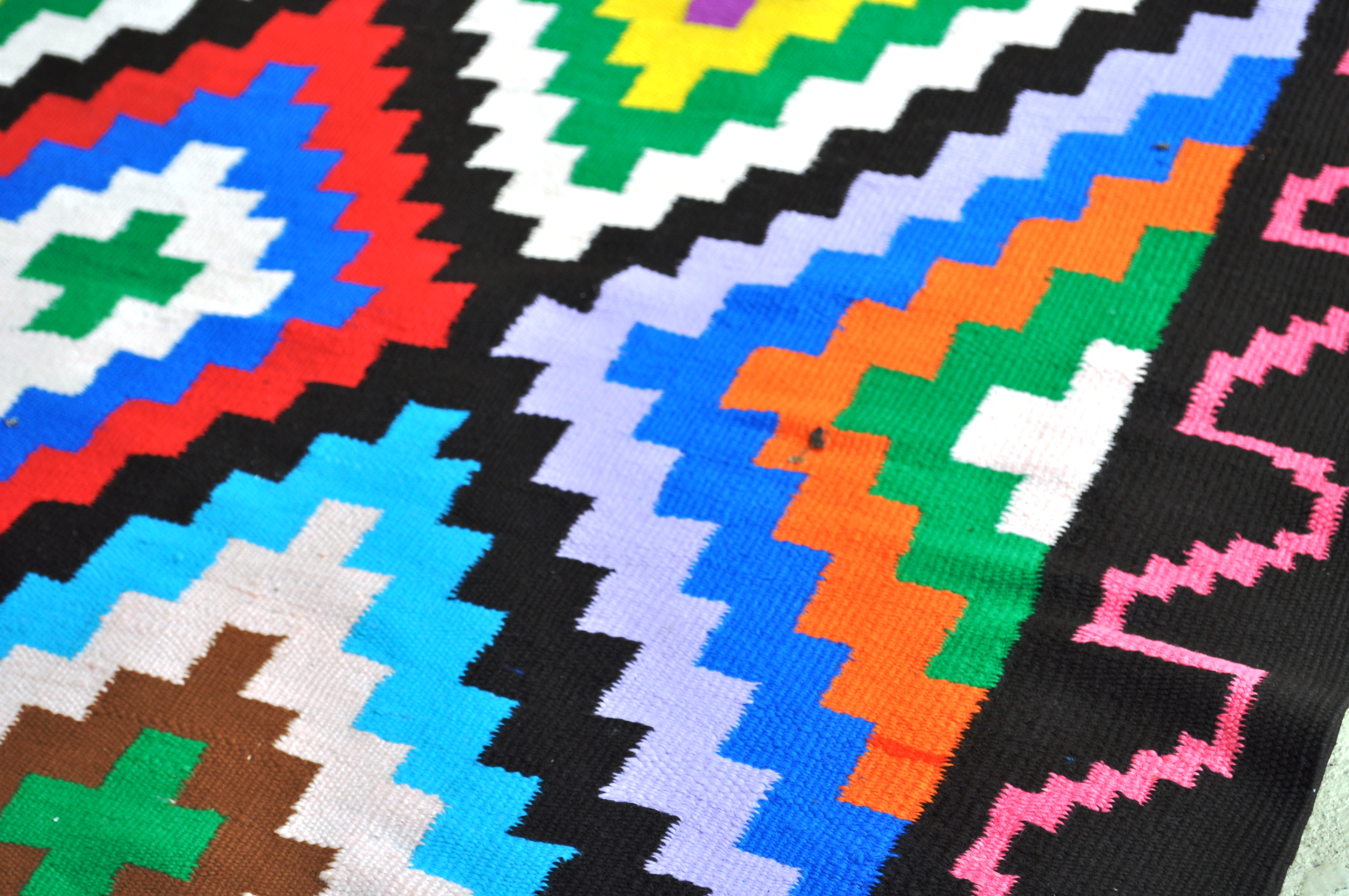
