= Métouia =

- Commune and town
- Location within Tunisia
- Coordinates: 33.97°N 10.00°E
- Country: Tunisia
- Governorate: Gabès Governorate

Population (2014)
  - Total: 20,648
- Time zone: UTC+1 (CET)

Métouia (Arabic: المطوية Al Matwiya), also spelled El Méthouia, is a town and commune in the Gabès Governorate, Tunisia. As of 2004 it had a population of 9,946. In summer, it increases to nearly 50 000 inhabitants due to the return of summer residents living abroad. Administratively, it has a municipality seat of 9,946 inhabitants and a delegation attached to the governorate of Gabès.

== History ==
Roman remains in Metouia witness Roman presence in ancient time. A large water resource have gathered settling tribes over the centuries in Metouia. According to the work of Victor Guérin, “Archaeological Travel in the Regence of Tunis” (1862) account 500 inhabitants in Métouia in 1862, describing the town as follows: "They grow very fertile gardens, divided by small separation of clay walls and watered by numerous rivulets. The tree that dominates is the palm tree. This set of gardens and the forest is an oasis of date palms larger than the previous one (Oudhref ) ".

== Geography ==
Located 12 kilometres from Gabès, Métouia has a wide areas of palm trees (about 270 hectares) and a coastline of 10 kilometres from its centre. Fisheries is diverse (essentiallyGrooved carpet shell, octopus and various species of fish), contributing to the high productivity of the Gulf of Gabès.

The main highway connecting the city is National Highway 1 (RN1).

== Economy ==
Its economy is based mainly on farming of oasis, select industrial activities (industrial Métouia zone El-Aouinet), and tourism.

== Sport ==
The town has two association football clubs: The Métouian Sport Union and The Métouian Athletic Youth (founded in 1947) – based in Tunis.

== Notable residents ==
- Änis Ben-Hatira, footballer.
- Amor Ben Salem, story writer, novelist, historian of modern and contemporary Tunisian literature.
- Oussama Romdhani, former Tunisian Communications Minister

== Twin towns – sister cities ==
Métouia is twinned with:

- (France) Gausson, since 1996.

== See also ==
- El Hamma
- Mareth
- List of cities in Tunisia
