= Kettana =

Town in Tunisia

Coordinates: 33°45′N 10°12′E

Kettana كتانة
- Town
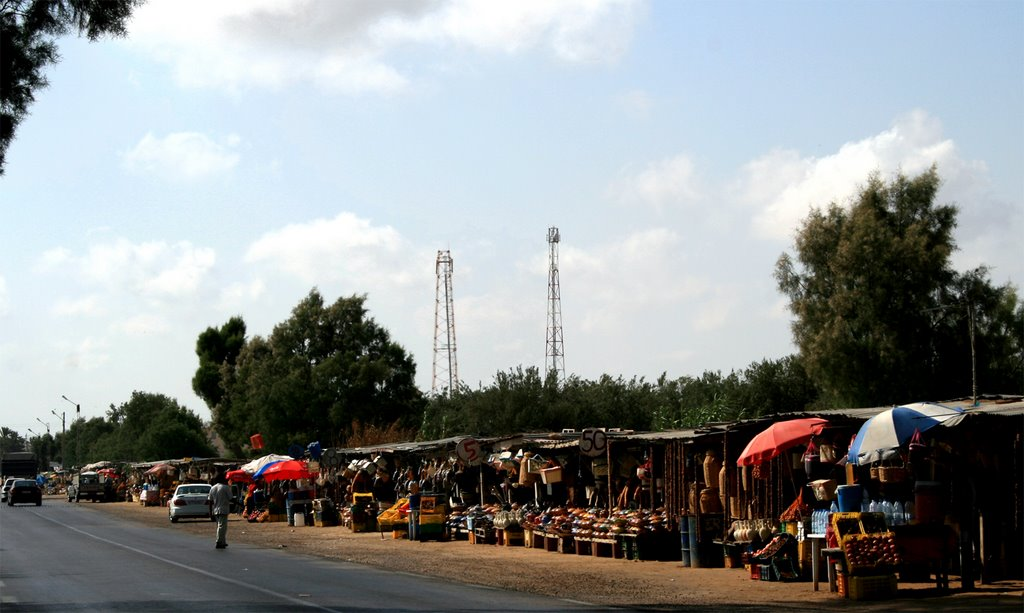
- Interactive map of Kettana
- Country: Tunisia
- Governorate: Gabes Governorate

Population
  - Total: 1,721
- Time zone: UTC+1 (CET)

Kettana is one of the villages of Gabès in the South of Tunisia. It is located 18 km south of Gabès, on the main road connecting Gabès and Medenine. Kettana is famous for cultivating pomegranates.

== History ==
Al-Tijani described Kettana in the 14th century:

"We arrived this day at the outskirts of Kettana, a small village surrounded by trees, with a beautiful appearance, as if it were a single garden full of greenery and freshness. Most of the trees there are olive trees [..] The people of Kettana have a large palace where they take refuge, and there is a fresh, bubbling spring there, from which a large pool of water has formed, adjacent to the western wall of the palace. From this spring, channels and pathways extend through the forest, irrigating it with water."
