= Nawara Development Project =

The Nawara Development Project is a natural gas field located in Tunisia. The project, situated in the south of Tunisia, focuses on extracting and processing natural gas from the Nawara gas field, a key resource.

== History ==
The Nawara Development Project's history is marked by milestones in exploration, discovery, and infrastructure development:

- 2003: The Jenein Sud exploration permit was granted to Tunisia's state-owned ETAP and Austria's OMV Group, with OMV assuming the exploration costs and risks.
- 2006: The Nawara gas and condensate field was discovered, marking a major achievement for Tunisia's hydrocarbon sector.
- 2008-2010: Drilling campaigns resulted in eight additional successful wells, further confirming the field's potential.
- 2010: The Ministry of Industry officially granted the concession for the Nawara field, equally shared between ETAP and OMV.
- 2012-2013: After negotiations with the Tunisian government over a proposed pipeline route change to Tataouine, the original plan was reinstated to ensure project viability.
- 2014: The government committed to local development initiatives, including a spur pipeline to Tataouine, a gas treatment plant, and an LPG bottling unit to boost regional economic activity.
- 2019: The Field was expected to be operational.
- 2020: The project was delayed by the COVID-19 pandemic.
- 2021: British engineers were brought in to work remotely on "technical intervention", while Tunisia agreed to continue to import petroleum products from Algeria.

== Objectives ==
The Nawara Development Project has the following objectives:

- To increase Tunisia’s natural gas production and reduce dependency on imported energy.
- To stimulate industrial and economic activity in the region, particularly in southern Tunisia.
- To generate employment opportunities through construction, operation, and ancillary industries.
- To build an energy infrastructure network, including extraction, processing, and transportation.

== Facilities ==
- The Central Processing Facility, at the field site, it processes raw gas before transportation.
- A 370 km pipeline connects the CPF to the Gas Treatment Plant in Gabès.
- Located in Gabès, a gas treatment plant processes natural gas into market-ready products, including LPG.
- Infrastructure such as the Tataouine spur pipeline and LPG bottling units are local development projects.

== See also ==
- Energy law
