= Gabès Governorate =

Governorate of Tunisia

Gabès ڨابس Gabis
- Governorate
- Flag Coat of arms

- Map of Tunisia with Gabès highlighted

- Subdivisions of Gabès Governorate
- Coordinates: 33°53′N 10°07′E
- Country: Tunisia
- Created: June 1956
- Capital: Gabès

Government
  - Governor: Vacant

Area
  - Total: 7,166 km^{2} (2,767 sq mi)
  - Rank: Ranked 8th of 24

Population (2014)
  - Total: 374,300
  - Rank: Ranked 16th of 24
  - Density: 52.23/km^{2} (135.3/sq mi)
- Demonym(s): Gabesian (Arabic: قابسي, Gabsi)
- Time zone: UTC+01 (CET)
- Postal prefix: 60xx
- Calling code: 75-2/75-3
- ISO 3166 code: TN-81

Gabès Governorate (Tunisian Arabic: ولاية ڨابس Wilāyat Gābis; French: Gouvernorat de Gabès) is one of the 24 governorates of Tunisia and in south-eastern Tunisia. It covers an area of 7166 km^{2} and had a population of 374,300 as at the 2014 census. The capital is Gabès.

== Geography ==
The governorate of Gabès is in southeast Tunisia on the coast of the Gulf of Gabès, 376 km south of the capital, Tunis.

Gabès has a hot Mediterranean climate. Gabès offers five contrasting landscapes: the beach, the mountains, the desert, small forest, oasis. It contains the eastern end of Chott el Fejej.

The coast is approximately half of that of the large bay. The gulf has several alternative names dating to antiquity and to an etymological association with onshore winds and sandbanks making navigation difficult, including Lesser Syrtis (see Gulf of Sidra which takes in also the mainly Libyan portion of the continental gulf).

== Administrative divisions ==
Administratively, the governorate is divided into thirteen delegations (mutamadiyat), sixteen municipalities, nine rural councils, and 73 sectors (imadas). The delegations and their populations from the 2004 and 2014 censuses, are listed below:

Delegation	Population in 2004	Population in 2014
Gabès Medina	47,057	46,731
Gabès Ouest	28,389	31,768
Gabès Sud	61,699	74,422
Ghannouch	22,681	28,051
El Metouia	12,115	12,507
Oudhref	13,747	15,371
Menzel El Habib	11,477	10,148
El Hamma	45,564	54,192
Habib Thameur Bouatouch	16,826	19,320
Matmata	5,766	4,444
Nouvelle Matmata	15,969	14,224
Mareth	51,796	52,845
Dkhilet Toujane	9,544	10,277

There are sixteen municipalities in the Gabès Governorate:

5111	Gabès	101,042
5112	Chenini Nahal	14,803
5113	Ghannouch	28,051
5114	Métouia	13,613
5115	Oudhref	17,931
5116	El Hamma	57,856
5117	Matmata	1,847
5118	Nouvelle Matmata	7,526
5119	Mareth	57,358
5120	Zarat	5,627
5121	Teboulbou	21,727
5122	Habib Thameur Bouatouch	19,320
5123	Kettana	13,310
5124	Bouchemma	12,182
5125	Dkhilet Toujane	10,277
5126	Menzel El Habib	10,148

== Tourism ==
Matmata is a Berber-speaking town largely of underground homes conserved with a community-based pre-industrialized lifestyle. The south-centre of the Wilāyat has semi-desert mountains and natural features nearby include splendid oases and caves. Eclectic souqs feature in the main municipalities, with traditional wood, stone, metal and textile products.

== Economy ==
The economy of the governorate is based, like all governorates that open onto the Mediterranean, on agriculture and fishing. The governorate is one of the richest fishing areas in Tunisia.

In the industrial field, the governorate is home to a center concentrating in particular chemical industries (processing of phosphate with the production of phosphoric acid, diammonium phosphateand dicalcium phosphate ) and agri-food . Its trade is carried out in particular thanks to the port which has eleven quays and twenty berths. In 2000, its traffic was estimated at 4,000,000 tonnes. Manufacturing industries employed 41.5% of the active population, the tertiary sector 35.5% and the agricultural sector 23%.

There are three industrial zones: Gabès, Métouia-El Aouinet and El Hamma.

== Politics ==
=== Governors ===
A list of Governoros since the independence:

- Habib Ben Mohamed Lahbib (1956-1958)
- Mohamed Bellamine (1958-1959)
- Youssef Jedaï (1959-1961)
- Ahmed Bellalouna (1961-1967)
- Zakaria Ben Mustapha (1967-1969)
- Hédi Baccouche(1969-1970)
- Rachid Badri (1970-1973)
- Abdelhamid Melki (1973)
- Ameur Ghedira (1973-1974)
- Abderrahim Zouari (1974-1978)
- Abderrazak Yazid (1978-1979)
- Mohamed Jegham (1979-1980)
- Ahmed Ben Jemiaâ (1980-1983)
- Mohamed Habib Gharbi (1983-1984)
- Abdelhak Lassoued (1984-1986)
- Mohamed Essid (1986-1988)
- Naceur El Gharbi (1988-1990)
- Moncef Louati (1990-1993)
- Slaheddine El Abed (1993-1996)
- Hassène Smaoui (1996-1998)
- Ali Trabelsi (1998-2000)
- Sadok Marzouk (2000-2002)
- Kamel Ben Ali (2002-2005)
- Brahim Briki (2005-July 2006)
- Abdelkrim Mosbah (2006-2009)
- Mokdad Missaoui (2009-2011)
- Chokri Necib (2011)
- Moncef Khemiri (2011)
- Mondher Yedas (2011-2012)
- Omar Chahbani (2012)
- Houcine Jrad (2012-2015)
- Nabil Zarrouk (2015)
- Ahmed Lamine Lansari (2015-2016)
- Mongi Thameur (2016-October 2021)
- Mosbah Kardamin (June 2022 – 2023)

=== Mayors ===
As of May 2018:

- Chenini Nahal: Abdelwahed Kabaou
- El Hamma Nassef Najeh
- Gabès: Habib Dhaouadi
- Ghannouch: Boulbeba Aleïa
- Mareth: Hédi Chaïr
- Menzel El Habib: Bornia Ajamni
- Matmata Aymen Chaabane
- Métouia: Insaf Salem
- Nouvelle Matmata: Youssef Kayel
- Oudhref: Doukali Bezouia
- Zarat: Abdeslam Dahmani
