= Chenini Nahal =

- Commune and town
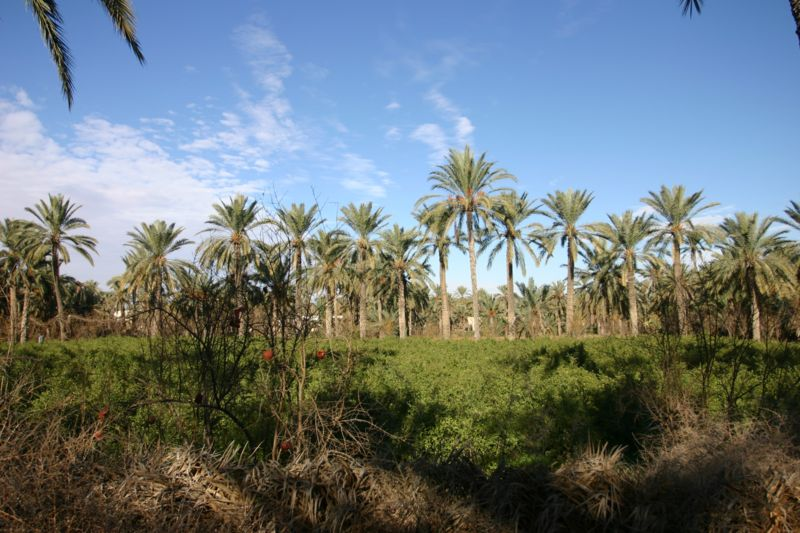

- Location within Tunisia
- Coordinates: 33.9°N 10.08°E
- Country: Tunisia
- Governorate: Gabès Governorate

Population (2004)
  - Total: 14,152
- Time zone: UTC+1 (CET)

Chenini Nahal (Arabic: شنني النحال Šaninī an Naḥāl) is a town and commune in the Gabès Governorate, Tunisia. As of 2004 it had a population of 14,152.

== See also ==
- List of cities in Tunisia
