= Ghannouch =

- Commune and town
- Location within Tunisia
- Coordinates: 33.93°N 10.07°E
- Country: Tunisia
- Governorate: Gabès Governorate

Population (2014)
  - Total: 28,051
- Time zone: UTC+1 (CET)

Ghannouch (Arabic: غنوش Ġannūš) is a town and commune in the Gabès Governorate on the Gulf of Gabès, occasionally named after this town instead, in Tunisia. As of 2004 it had a population of 22,681.

== Population ==
2014 Census (Municipal)
Homes	Families	Males	Females	Total
5829	5519	14552	13499	28051

== See also ==
- List of cities in Tunisia
