= Sidi Daoud, Tunisia =

Village in Tunisia

Coordinates: 37.0200°N 10.9100°E

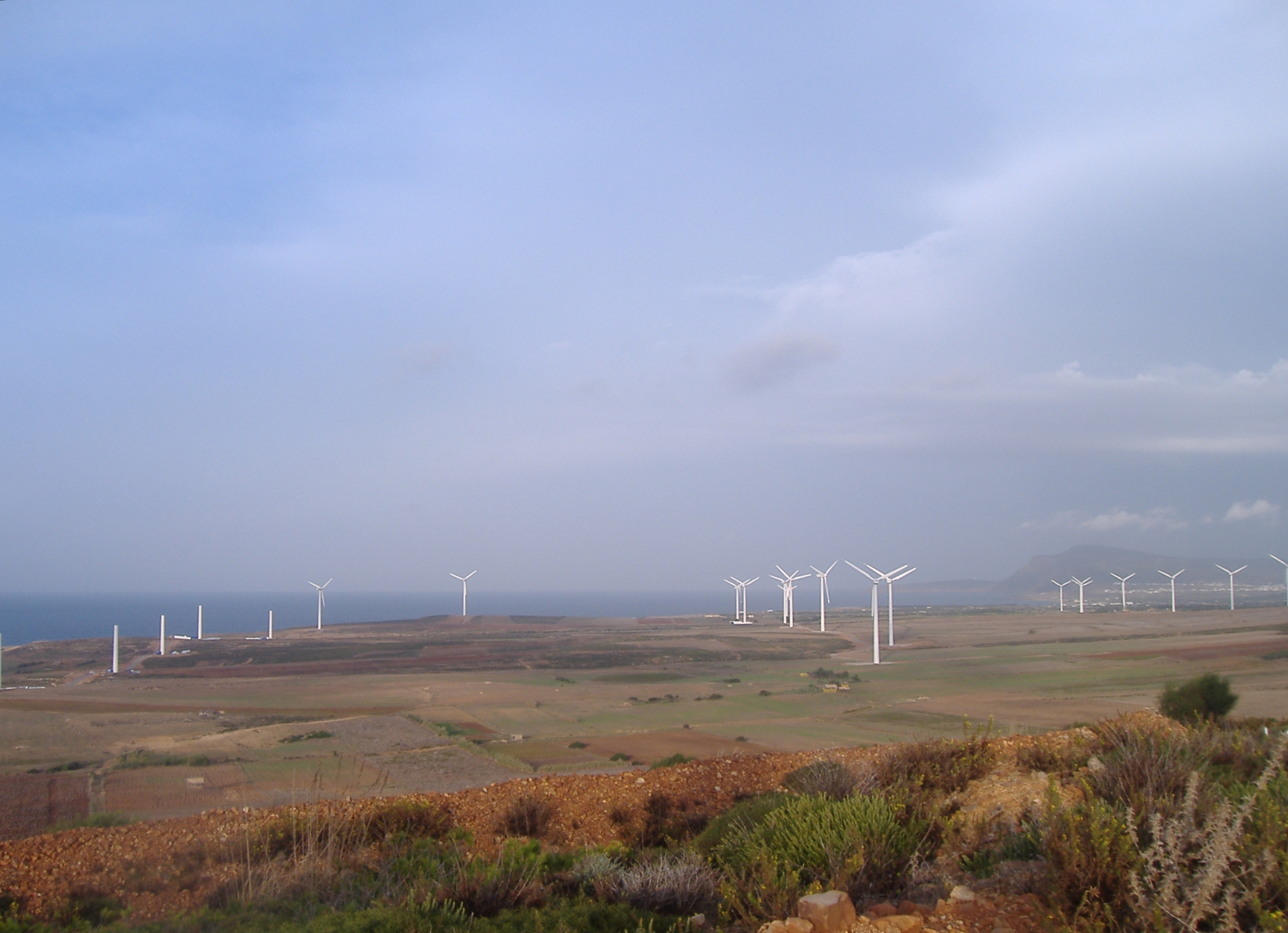
Sidi Daoud, Tunisia

Sidi Daoud ( سيدي داود ) is a Tunisian village located at 37 ° 01 'north, 10 ° 55 'east on the northeast end of the peninsula of Cap Bon, about ten kilometers from the city of El Haouaria.

The village is erected on the remains of an ancient Roman city known as Missua and which had economic relations with Ostia.

It has developed around two poles: the mausoleum of Sidi Daoud Ennoubi and a fishing port. Its economic activity is mainly oriented towards seasonal fishing for bluefin tuna, with quite traditional methods practiced since Antiquity.

The site houses a wind farm contributing to the production of electric power.

== History ==
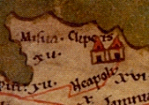
Sidi Daoud, Cape Bon as shown on the 4th century Roman map Tabula Peutingeriana.

During the Roman Empire Sidi Daoud was a Roman town called Missua, which was of the Roman province of Africa Proconsulare.

There was a Christian bishopric in the town, suffragan of the Archdiocese of Carthage. We know two bishops, Irondino, exiled by the Vandal king Huneric in 484, and Servusdei, who witnessed the Carthaginian council of 525. Today the diocese survives as a titular bishopric and the current bishop is Paul Vollmar, of Chur.

== See also ==
- Sidi Daoud Algeria
- Sidi Daoud (Boumerdes)
- Sidi Daoud, La Marsa, Tunis
