= Tunisian Company of Electricity and Gas =

Tunisian public company

Société tunisienne de l'électricité et du gaz
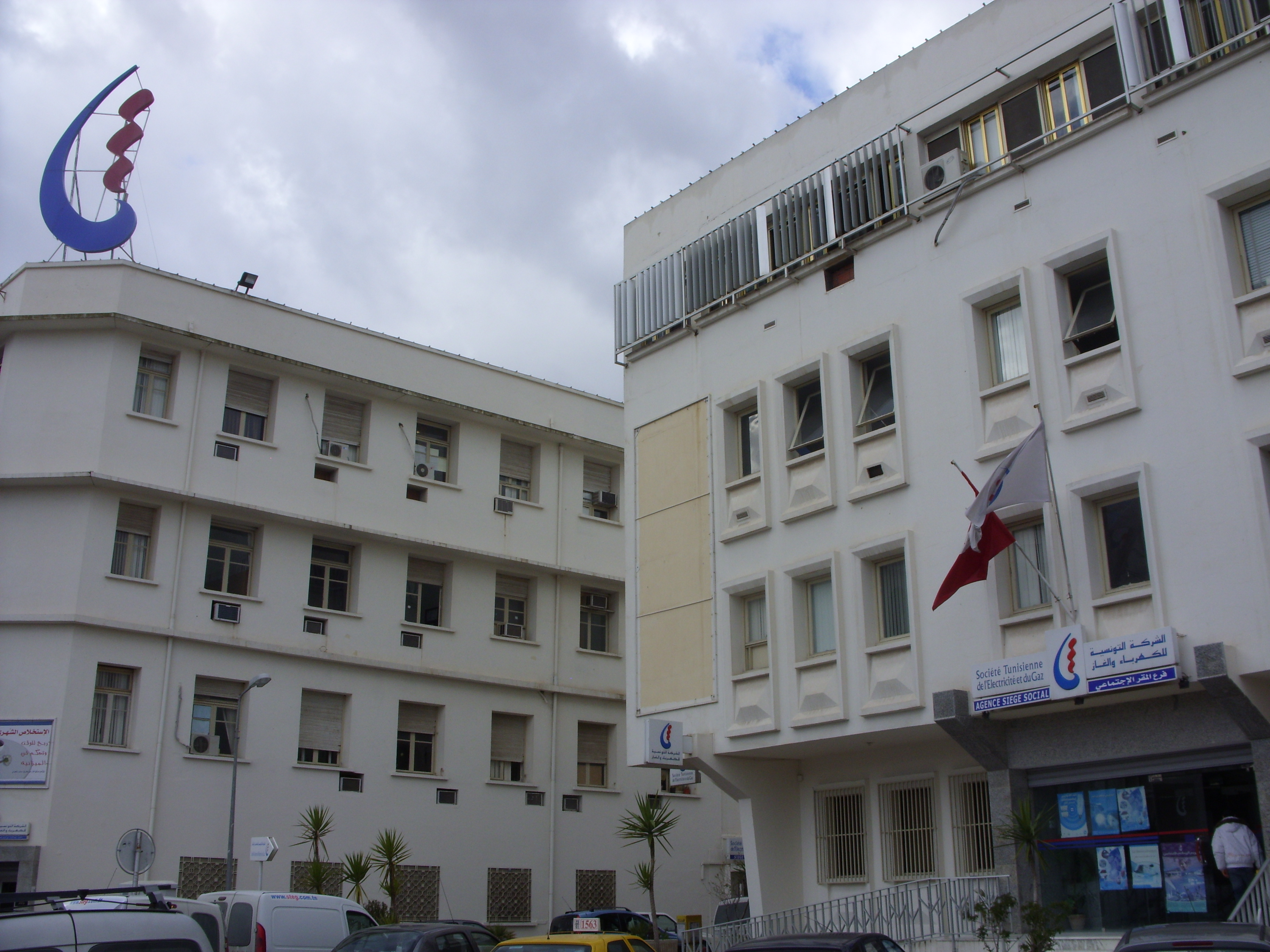
- Founded: 3 April 1962
- Type: Tunisian public company
- Website: www.steg.com.tn

Société tunisienne de l'électricité et du gaz (الشركة التونسية للكهرباء و الغاز) or STEG is a Tunisian public company non-administrative. Established in 1962, its mission is the production and distribution of electricity and natural gas on the Tunisian territory. STEG was the second-largest Tunisian company by revenues in 2009.

== History ==
Until August 1959 the Tunisian electricity industry was divided among eight different companies. Having decided to temporarily take over these companies, the Tunisian government site, 15 August 1958, a management committee at the head of one of these companies known as Tunisian Company of Electricity and transport. By Decree-Law No. 62-8 of 3 April 1962, the State terminates this situation by creating a public monopoly given to the STEG. Shortly after, an electrification policy is in place that, in forty years, the urban electrification rate of 20% passed nearly 100% and the rural electrification rate from 6% to 99%.

== Production ==
STEG has a park in 2011 production of 24 production units with a total capacity of 3,526 MW, powered by 82% natural gas.

Alstom Power worked on the construction of STEG's combined cycle power plants in Sousse (1994), Radès (2001) and Ghannouch (2011).
