= Mareth =

Coordinates: 33°38′N 10°18′E

- Commune and town
- Location within Tunisia
- Country: Tunisia
- Governorate: Gabès Governorate

Population (2014)
  - Total: 17,385
- Time zone: UTC+1 (CET)

Mareth (Arabic: مارث Māraṯ) is a town and commune in Tunisia, located between Gabès and Medenine. In 2014 it had a population of 17,385.

== Population ==
2014 Census (Municipal)
Homes	Families	Males	Females	Total
5502	4087	8162	9143	17305
