= Matmata, Tunisia =

Town in Tunisia

Coordinates: 33°32′33.5″N 09°58′0.5″E

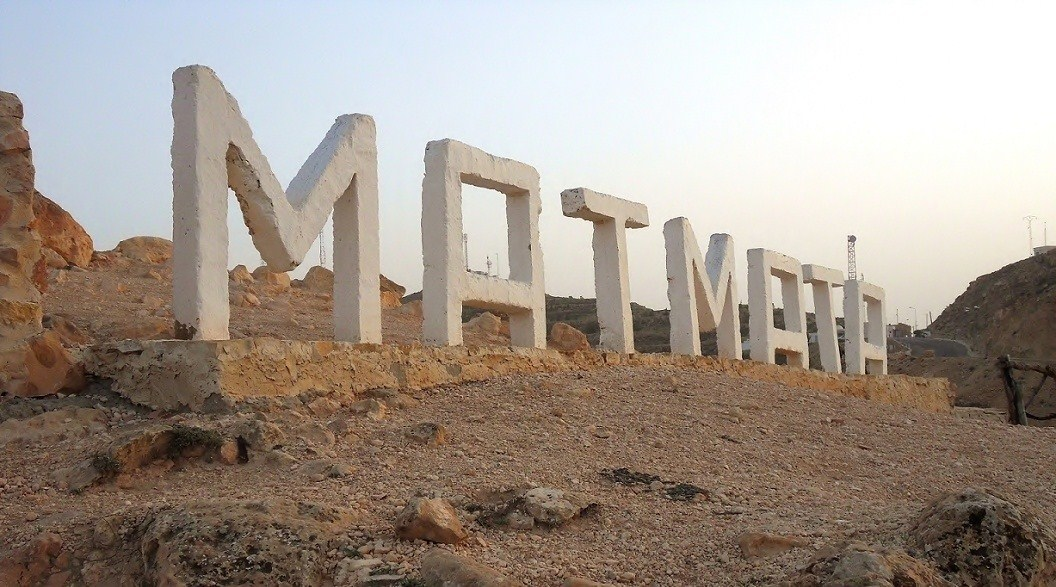
A welcoming sight in Tunisia

Matmata (Arabic: مطماطة maṭmāṭa; Berber: ⵎⴰⵜⵎⴰⵜⴰ) is a small Berber speaking town in southern Tunisia. Some of the local Berber residents live in traditional underground "troglodyte" structures. In 2004 it had a population of 2,116.

The structures typical for the village are created by digging a large pit in the ground. Around the perimeter of this pit artificial caves are then dug to be used as rooms, with some homes comprising multiple pits, connected by trench-like passageways.

== History ==
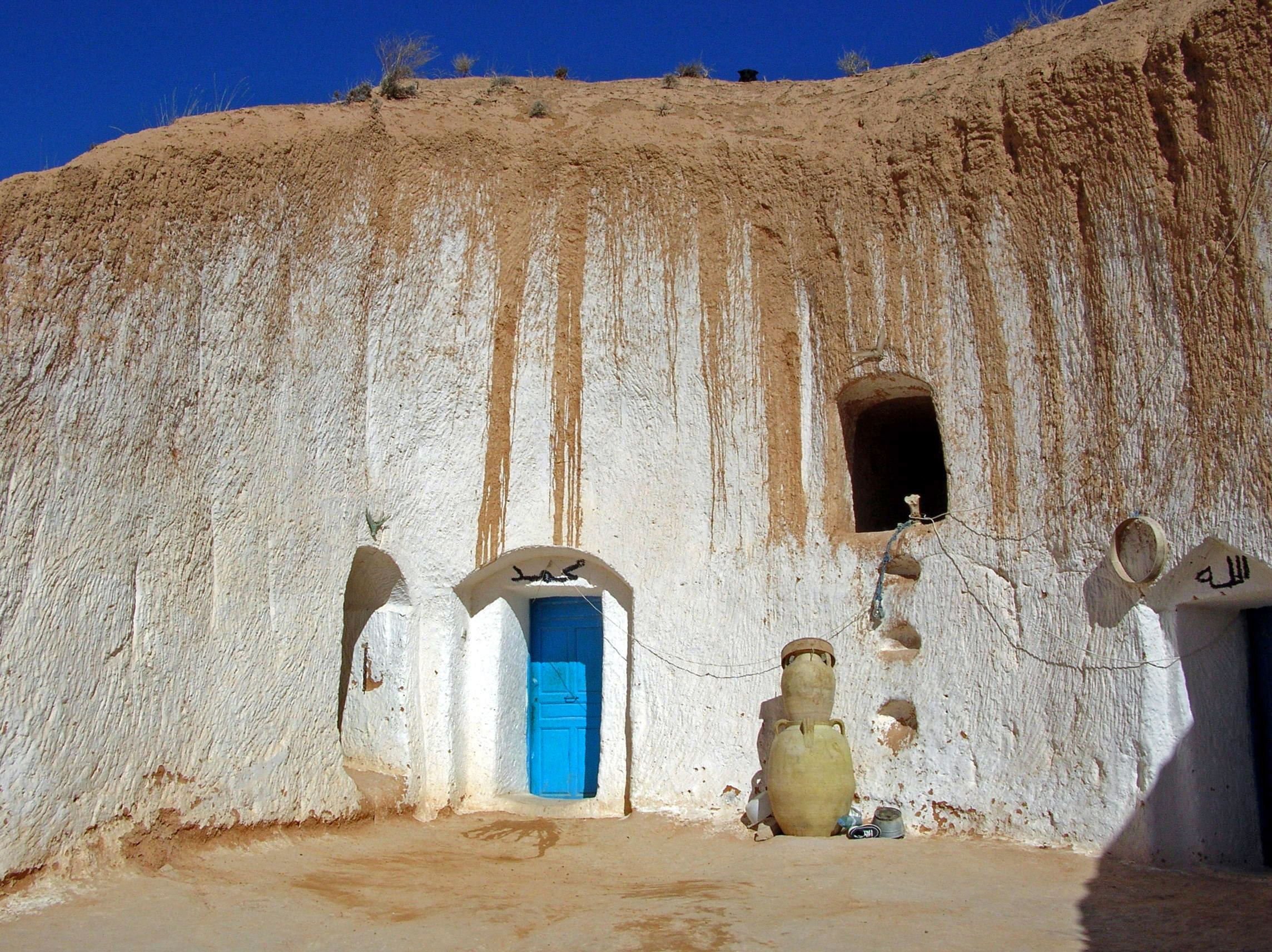
Troglodyte house

It was not generally known until 1969 that there were regular settlements in this area besides wandering nomadic tribes. That year, intensive rains that lasted for 22 days inundated the troglodyte homes and caused many of them to collapse. In order to get help from the authorities, a delegation was sent to the community center of the region in the town of Gabès. The visit came as a surprise, but help was provided, and the above-ground settlement of Matmâta was built. However, most of the people continued their lives in re-built underground homes, and only a few of the families moved to the new surface dwellings.

Today, Matmata is a popular tourist attraction, and most of the population lives on tourism and folklore exhibitions in their homes.

== In popular culture ==
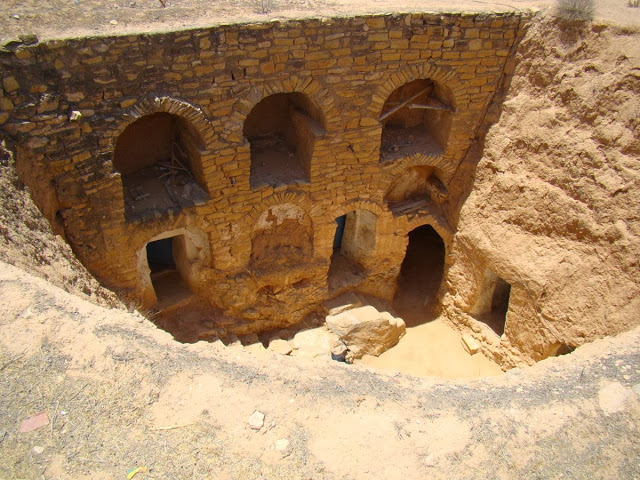
Cave dwelling

- The Hotel Sidi Idriss in Matmata was used in 1976 as a filming location in Star Wars Episode IV: A New Hope, in which it was featured as the home of Luke Skywalker, his Aunt Beru Lars and Uncle Owen Lars on the planet Tatooine. The hotel is designed as a traditional Berber troglodyte underground building. It was featured again in the 2002 prequel film Star Wars: Episode II – Attack of the Clones.
- Two of Call of Duty: Finest Hour's missions take place on the outskirts of Matmata, one involving destroying a radio mast, and another a German fuel depot.
- One of Call of Duty 2's missions and multiplayer maps takes place in Matmâta as part of North African Campaign.
- Film La soif noire, an adaptation of the book from Swiss author Hans Ruesch starring Antonio Banderas and Freida Pinto.

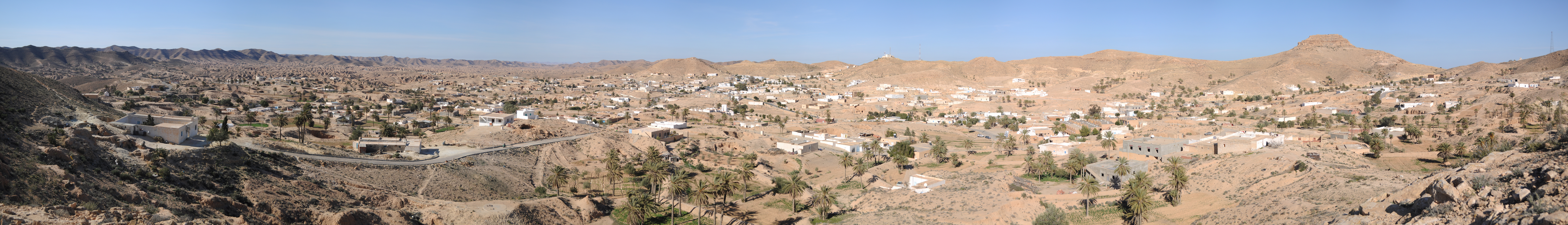
Panorama of the area showing its unique topography.
