= List of Ramsar sites in Tunisia =

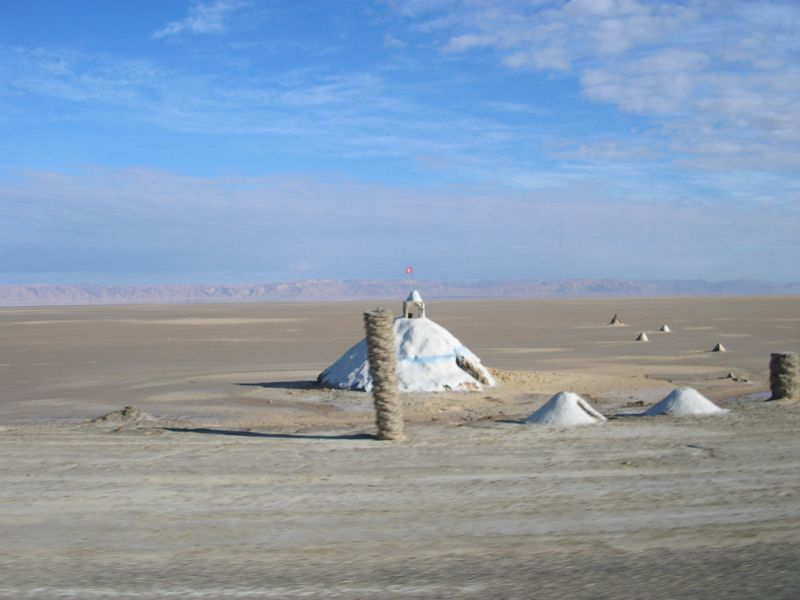
Chott el-Jérid

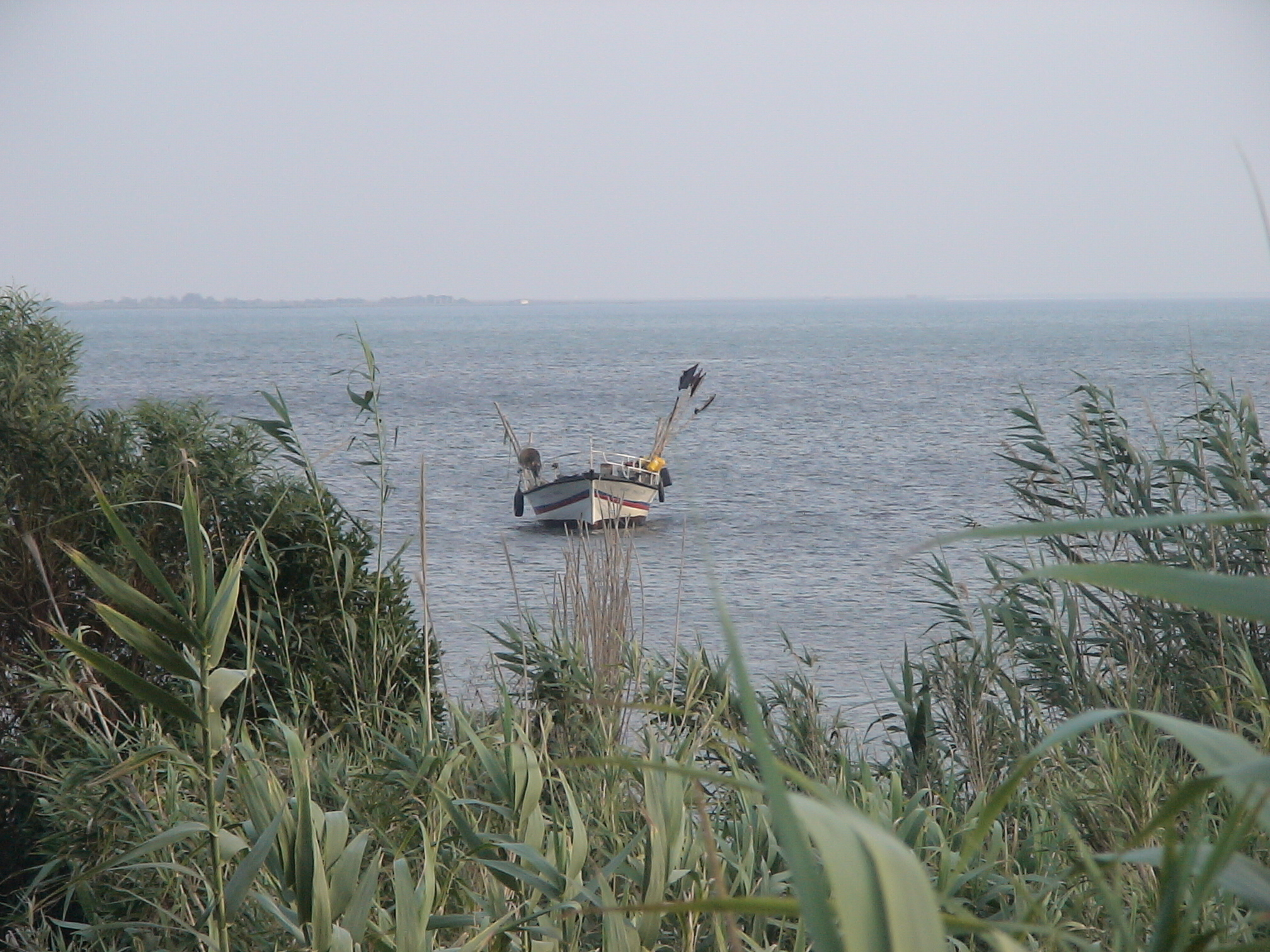
Lagune de Ghar El Melh

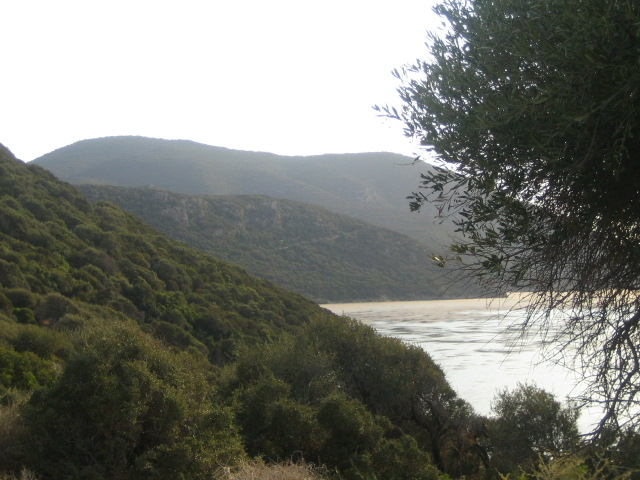
Lac Ichkeul

The number of Ramsar sites in Tunisia is 42 in 2022, corresponding in total to 844,685 hectares of land coverage. Below is a list of these sites. Tunisia started to take part in the Ramsar Convention in 1981 and has many Wetlands of significant size, such as the Chott el Jerid and Ichkeul Lake, a UNESCO World Heritage Center.

Ramsar number	Site name	Filing date	Governorate	Area (ha)	Coordinates	Images
1696	Ain Dahab	November 7, 2007	Siliana	560	TN 35°53′N 9°28′E	
1697	Bahiret el Bibane	November 7, 2007	Medenine	39,266	TN 33°15′N 11°15′E	
2017	Sidi el Barrak Dam	February 2, 2012	Beja	2,734	TN 37°00′N 09°01′E	
1698	Lebna Dam	November 7, 2007	Nabeul	1,147	TN 36°45′N 10°54′E	
2077	Mlaabi Dam	September 21, 2012	Nabeul	98	TN 36°49′N 10°59′E	
2010	Merguellil Dam	February 2, 2012	Kairouan	714	TN 35°33′N 09°44′E	
2013	Oued El Hajar Dam	February 2, 2012	Nabeul	254	TN 36°50′N 11°02′E	
2014	Oued Ermal Dam	February 2, 2012	Zaghouan	620	TN 36°20′N 10°20′E	
2016	Sidi Abdelmoneem Dam	February 2, 2012	Nabeul	31	TN 36°51′N 10°56′E	
2018	Sidi Saad Dam	February 2, 2012	Kairouan	8,650	TN 35°22′N 09°40′E	
2005	Chott Elguetar	February 2, 2012	Gafsa	7,400	TN 34°17′N 8°54′E	
1699	Chott el Jerid	November 7, 2007	Tozeur and Kébili	586,187	TN 33°42′N 8°24′E	
2096	Lake of Tunis Complex	January 23, 2013	Tunis	2,243	TN 36°49′N 10°14′E	
2100	Wetland complex of the Sebkhet Oum Ez-Zessar and Sebkhet El Grine	February 2, 2013	Medenine	9,195	TN 33°39′N 10°31′E	
2101	Wetland complex of the Ghdir El Goulla Dam and El Mornaguia (Al Mornaguia) Dam	February 2, 2013	Ariana	273	TN 36°46′42″N 10°02′16″E	
2076	Wetland complex of the Chott el Guetayate and the Sebkhet Dhreia, and the Akarit, Rekhama and Meleh wadis	September 21, 2012	Sfax and Gabes	4,845	TN 34°06′N 10°01′E	
1700	Djerba Bin El Ouedian	November 7, 2007	Medenine	12,082	TN 33°40′N 10°55′E	
1701	Djerba Guellala	November 7, 2007	Medenine	2,285	TN 33°42′N 10°44′E	
1702	Djerba Ras Rmel	November 7, 2007	Medenine	1,856	TN 33°52′N 10°54′E	
2447	Garâa Sejenane	February 2, 2021	Bizerte	4,322	TN 37°05'51"N 09°12'48"E	
1703	Garaet Sidi Mansour	November 7, 2007	Gafsa	2,426	TN 34°14′N 9°29′E	
2008	Gulf of Boughrara	February 2, 2012	Medenine	12,880	TN 33°28′N 10°34′E	
2009	Les gorges de Seldja	February 2, 2012	Gafsa	675	TN 34°09′N 8°17′E	
2012	Islands of Kerkennah or the Kerkennah archipelago	February 2, 2012	Sfax	1,500	TN 34°47′N 11°14′E	
213	Ichkeul	November 24, 1980	Bizerte	12,600	TN 37°10′N 9°40′E	
1704	Kneiss Islands with their intertidal zones	November 7, 2007	Sfax	22,027	TN 34°22′N 10°20′E	
1705	Mejen Ech Chitan Lake and peatland	November 7, 2007	Bizerte	7	TN 37°9′N 9°6′E	
1706	Ghar al Melh lagoon and Mejerda delta	November 7, 2007	Bizerte and Ariana	10,168	TN 37°6′N 10°11′E	
1707	Eastern Cap Bon lagoons	November 7, 2007	Nabeul	504	TN 36°33′N 10°51′E	
2007	Garaet Douza freshwater marshes	February 2, 2012	Gafsa	1,400	TN 34°28′N 8°29′E	
2011	Oued Dekouk (wadi)	February 2, 2012	Tataouine	5,750	TN 32°08′N 10°32′E	
1708	Dar Fatma peatlands	November 7, 2007	Jendouba	13	TN 36°48′N 8°46′E	
2220	Saddine natural reserve	February 2, 2012	El Kef	2,610	TN 36°05'25"N 08°30'46"E	
2015	Salines of Monastir (salt ponds)	February 2, 2012	Monastir	1,000	TN 35°45′N 10°46′E	
1709	Salines of Thyna	November 7, 2007	Sfax	3,343	TN 34°39′N 10°43′E	
1710	Sebkhet Kelbia	November 7, 2007	Sousse	8,732	TN 35°50′N 10°15′E	
1711	Sebkhet Noual	November 7, 2007	Sidi Bouzid and Sfax	17,060	TN 34°25′N 9°45′E	
2006	Sebkhet Halk Elmanzel and Oued Essed (wadi)	February 2, 2012	Sousse	1,450	TN 35°59′N 10°30′E	
1712	Sebkha Séjoumi	November 7, 2007	Tunis	2,979	TN 36°45′N 10°9′E	
2019	Sebkhet Sidi Elhani	February 2, 2012	Sousse and Mahdia	36,000	TN 36°51′N 10°56′E	
1713	Sebkhet Soliman	November 7, 2007	Nabeul	880	TN 36°43′N 10°29′E	
1714	Oasis wetlands of Kébili	November 7, 2007	Kébili	2,419	TN 33°30′N 8°55′E	
Sources : List established under the Ramsar Convention
