= Ouersnia =

Ouersnia الوارسن
- Location in Tunisia
- Coordinates: 33°9′29″N 11°10′5″E
- Country: Tunisia
- Governorate: Medenine
- Delegation: Ben Gardane

Area
  - City: 53 sq mi (137 km^{2})

Population (2014)
  - Metro: 8,421
- Time zone: UTC+1 (CET)
  - Summer (DST): UTC+2 (CEST)
- Website: www.commune-bengardene.gov.tn

Ouersnia, also spelled Ouarsania, pronounced Warsnia (Tunisian Arabic: الوراسنية or الوارسنية, Warsnia; French: Ouersnia) is a village located in Ben Guerdane City, in Southeastern Tunisia. It lies about 5 km in the center of the city of Ben Guerdane and has an area of 137 square kilometers. Its population reached 8,421 according to 2014 statistics.
