= Chareb Errajel =

Chareb Errajel شارب الراجل
- Location in Tunisia
- Coordinates: 33°9′29″N 11°10′5″E
- Country: Tunisia
- Governorate: Medenine
- Delegation: Ben Gardane

Area
  - City: 52 sq mi (135 km^{2})

Population (2014)
  - Metro: 4,108
- Time zone: UTC+1 (CET)
  - Summer (DST): UTC+2 (CEST)
- Website: www.commune-bengardene.gov.tn

Chareb Errajel, (Tunisian Arabic: شارب الراجل , sharb alrajl; French: Chareb Errajel) is a village and Imadat located in Ben Guerdane City, in Southeastern Tunisia. It lies about 3 km in the center of the city of Ben Guerdane and has an area of 135 square kilometers. It has a population of 4,108, according to 2014 statistics.
