= Midoun =

- Commune and town
- Location in Tunisia
- Coordinates: 33.82°N 11.00°E
- Country: Tunisia
- Governorate: Médenine Governorate

Population (2014)
  - Total: 63,528
- Time zone: UTC+1 (CET)

Midoun (Arabic: ميدون, Mīdūn) is a town and commune located on the north east of Djerba in Medenine Governorate, Tunisia. As of 2014 it had a population of 63,528.

Midoun has 7 Imadas (districts): Midoun, Mahboubine, El-May, Arkou, Sedouikch, Robbana and Ben-Maaguel.

The commune has an electrification rate of 99% and a drinking water connection rate of 84%. The commune also has 90 hotels ranging from motels to luxurious 5-star hotels with a total capacity of 50,000 beds, making it the biggest tourist destination in Tunisia.

== See also ==
- List of cities in Tunisia
