= Bahiret el Bibane =

Lagoon in Tunisia

Coordinates: 33°15′N 11°16′E

Designations

Ramsar Wetland
- Designated: 7 November 2007
- Reference no.: 1697

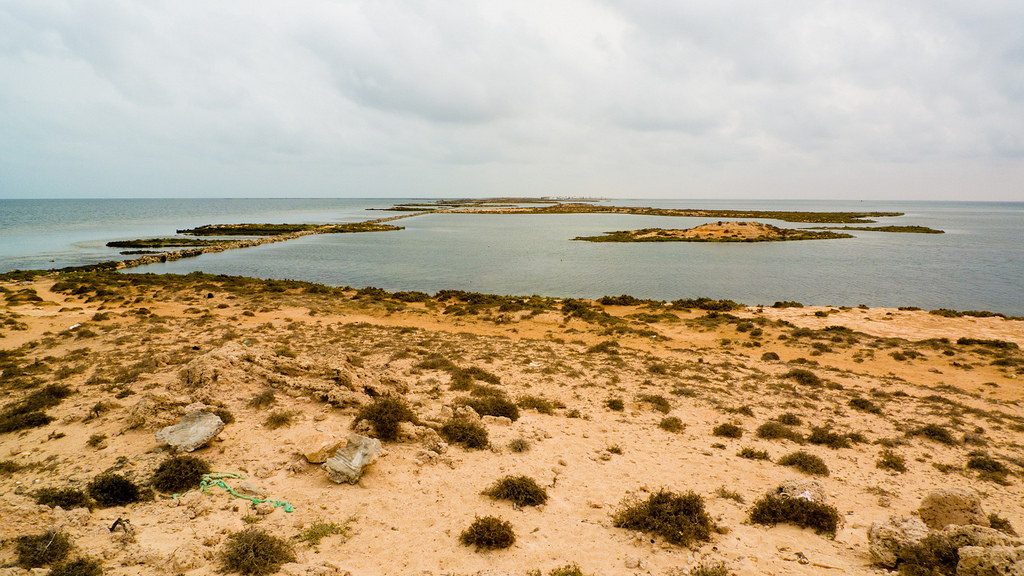
El Bibane Lagoon

Bahiret el Bibane (Arabic: بحيرة البيبان) is a large lagoon of around 33 km length by 10 km width near the Libyan border located 10 km North of the town of Ben Gardane and 20 km West of the city of Zarzis, in the Medenine governorate. It has been classified as a Ramsar Wetland since 2007. The lagoon itself is the second largest in Tunisia after the lagoon or gulf of Boughrara.

In addition to the main lagoon, the Ramsar protected site of 39.266 ha also covers the coastal waters outside the lagoon, a smaller lagoon called Bahar Alouane (the sea of colors) along the coast towards the city of Zarzis, and two "sebkhets" or salt flats West of the main lagoon.

== Geography ==
The main lagoon is separated from the sea by two peninsulas (Solb el-Gharbi and Solb ech-Charki) which almost meet. These two karstic peninsulas of ca 12 km length each are made of fossilized limestone slabs and nine small islets are located in the opening in between them. This unusual configuration where the open sea communicates with the inside of the lagoon is called "el bibane" (the doors in Tunisian Arabic), which gives the name of the site "the little sea (Bahiret) of the Doors"

The lagoon has a maximal depth comprised between 5.5. and 6.5m. Despite being in permanent communication with the sea, it is hypersaline (on average 44 PSU but it varies depending on the location in the laguna and over time in the year). The lagoon is intermittently fed with fresh water from the wadi Fessi (average annual contribution of 10 million m3): The large-bed intermittent wadi originates in the Mount Matmata to the South. In the rare occurrence of flooding, the lagoon controls the floods and captures sediments, playing an important role in stabilizing the coast. Another small inflow of fresh water is also present along the southern edge of the lagoon.

Bahiret el bibane is under the influence of the tide: Tidal sites are extremely rare in the Mediterranean and very important for birds, fish and shellfish. Bahiret el Bibane is located in one of the only two areas in the Mediterranean sea with considerable tide amplitude, in the one extending from Sfax to the Libyan border via the Farwa lagoon (The other one is in the Northern Adriatic Sea and includes the Lagoon of Venice).

The average tidal range in the lagoon is 0.7 m, sometimes amplified by winds. Though this tide amplitude is inferior to the one near Gabes, the peculiar geography of the lagoon creates strong sea currents hydrodynamics at the opening passes where it connects with the sea. This attracts fish which naturally tends to favor swimming against strong currents.

== Site ecology ==
=== Salt flats - Sebkha-s ===
Boujmel Sebakh (in the NW) and El Medeïna (at the SE end of the lagoon) dry up in the summer, with the ground turning salt-white. In winter, during the rainy season, they look in part like an extension of the lagoon. Their year-round vegetation consists mostly of Salicornia arabica and Salicornia fructicosa. In areas and during the drier season when a chloride or sulphate cust forms on a dry-looking ground, the Salicornias give way to Halocnemum strobilaceum. Where and when the water is deeper than 1m, these plants are replaced by Arthrocnemum indicum. The deeper center of the sebkha areas is generally devoid of vegetation except during the drier season when it is fleetingly dominated by Halopeplis amplexicaulis.

=== Marine environment ===
Dissolved oxygen is present in satisfactory quantities throughout the lagoon, due to the strength of the currents entering the lagoon and the presence of a dense underwater plant cover. Average oxygen saturation is 109 percent and can reach 133 percent. The importance of photosynthetic activity of marine Magnoliophyte beds is demonstrated by the fact that dissolved oxygen values are higher during the day that those measured at night. However, the lagoon retains a good water transparency (and chlorophyll concentrations no higher than 1.47 μg/L) due to the strength of the tidal currents.

The number of benthic macrophyte species recorded in the lagoon is 22 species including 3 magnolithophytes and 19 macroalgae.

=== Fish ===
The lagoon provides a safe place for fish at a critical stage of their life cycle: young fish enters the lagoon, develops in its rich and protected water and once grown exit to reenter into the sea.

=== Birds ===
The critically endangered slender billed curlew Numenius tenuirostris sightings have become more and more infrequent around the world. Groups of curlews had been observed in 1979 and years prior in the protected area.

Numbers of wintering birds reaching 35,000 are regularly observed. Most yearly observations (unpublished in the scientific literature) are done by the national Tunisian NGO "Association les amis des Oiseaux". For some types of birds, the numbers wintering around Bahiret el Bibane exceed 1% of their world population, an important criteria in the Ramsar convention for how critical a site is to a species. Such is the case for: The great cormorant Phalacrocorax carbo whose numbers vary between 3,000 and 10,000 individuals, and the greater flamingo Phoenicopterus (ruber) roseus whose numbers observed vary between 1,000 (1%) and 3,000 (3% of the world population).

== History and Fishing methods ==
=== Antiquity ===
The fishing resources of the lagoon were known since antiquity: local archeological data found on the ground confirms ancient texts descriptions.

The Periplus of Pseudo-Scylax describes salted fish production centers (Greek:Tarikheiae) between the Libyan town of Sabratha (the antique Abrotonon) and the "Island of shoals" (today's Djerba). More precisely, Strabo (XVII,3,18) locates some of these manufacturing centers producing salted fish (Greek:Tarikheiae) and others producing purple dye (porphyrobapheia), the famous Phoenician purple made from Muricidae sea snails, in Zoukhis, i.e. at the entrance of Bahiret el Biben's lagoon. Indeed, remains of Roman cuves and mosaics have been found on the Sidi Ahmed Chaouch islet, near the Hispano-Turkish bordj (tower). Strabo (XVII, 16) also mentions observatories (which he calls thynnoscopia) set-up to watch for fish migrations, and these could correspond to the Roman era towers remains found on the peninsulas (Solb el-Gharbi and Solb ech-Charki)

The extent of archeological remains from Antiquity, connected to fishing activities, testifies to a denser human presence around the lagoon than today: Many antique cisterns of large size were discovered in Henchir Bou Gueurnine on the southern shore of the lagoon, facing the opening to the sea. In Henchir Medeina, at the South Eastern extremity of the lagoon, remains extending over 500m were initially mistaken for the quais of a port. But the long row of blocks or stone slabs arranged in double lines on the inside of the shallow lagoon turned out to be eroded remains of a series of vats belonging to a factory producing salted fish or garum, similar to other found in Nabeul, Salakta and the Kerkennah islands in Tunisia or in Morocco and Spain. Those could well be the antique town of Pisida that the Roman road map Tabla Peutingeriana locates between Pons Zitha (El-Kantara) and Sabratha.

=== Traditional Cherfia-s or Zroub-s Fish traps ===
The Punic, then Roman large scale semi-industrial fish-salting and garum production establishments seemed to be abandoned with the collapse of trade and the Roman empire and not much is known about the potential changes in fishing methods and fisheries until the 1st available written record of 1896, except the following: Areas of the seabed close to the lagoon were owned by locals and could be sold or rented like any piece of dry-land property, in a situation similar to what exists to this day on the Kerkenah Islands. On these shallow areas, complex fish-traps called Cherfia-s or Zroub-s were built by sticking vertically palm branches in the marine sediment in such a way that it would never be overtaken by the waters even of the strongest tide. The palm branches "walls" form dams of more or less complex shape, skilfully oriented according to the currents so that the fish are led along its main axis into a bottleneck and pass a grid made with deburred palm leaves, once in the main polygon-shaped enclosure (or lead in to another one), the shade made by the walls of palms lure the fish into the better lit tips of the polygon capped with traps made with twigs of date branches.

Fishing sustainably was preserved first by limiting the number of fixed traps. For example, in front of the largest opening, at the location of "El Biban" itself, only seven Cherfia were built on the shallow depths on the sea-side of the lagoon, far away from the narrow opening itself. Line fishing or fishing with nets was forbidden in a large circumference outside and inside the lagoon in proximity to the traps. Finally, a period between one month and two months per year (beginning February to beginning April) was left fallow to allow the fish to reproduce and the ecosystem to regenerate: The charfia-s fixed traps were dismantled and fishing with line or nets inside the lagoon was also forbidden.

=== Fishing Weir - "bordigue" ===
(section to be developed from )

During four years (2000- 2004), the Spanish Pharmaceutical company PharmaMar cultivated and harvested Ecteinascidia turbinata, a sea squirt (a type of tunicate) to produce the anticancer pharmaceutical trabectedin against soft tissue sarcoma and some ovarian cancers.

The El Bibane lagoon is the largest and the most productive lagoon in Tunisia in terms of fish capture. The current exploitation system is not good, especially since the lagoon was licensed to private companies that did not respect their commitments toward its responsible exploitation. The current exploitation system is essentially based on the "bordigue", which assures the largest part of the fish capture. However, this device is very heavy to handle in terms of cost and manpower

Several programs have been developed to improve the management of biodiversity in the long term and to ensure sustainable development of the fishing sector in and around the Bahiret el Bibane.
