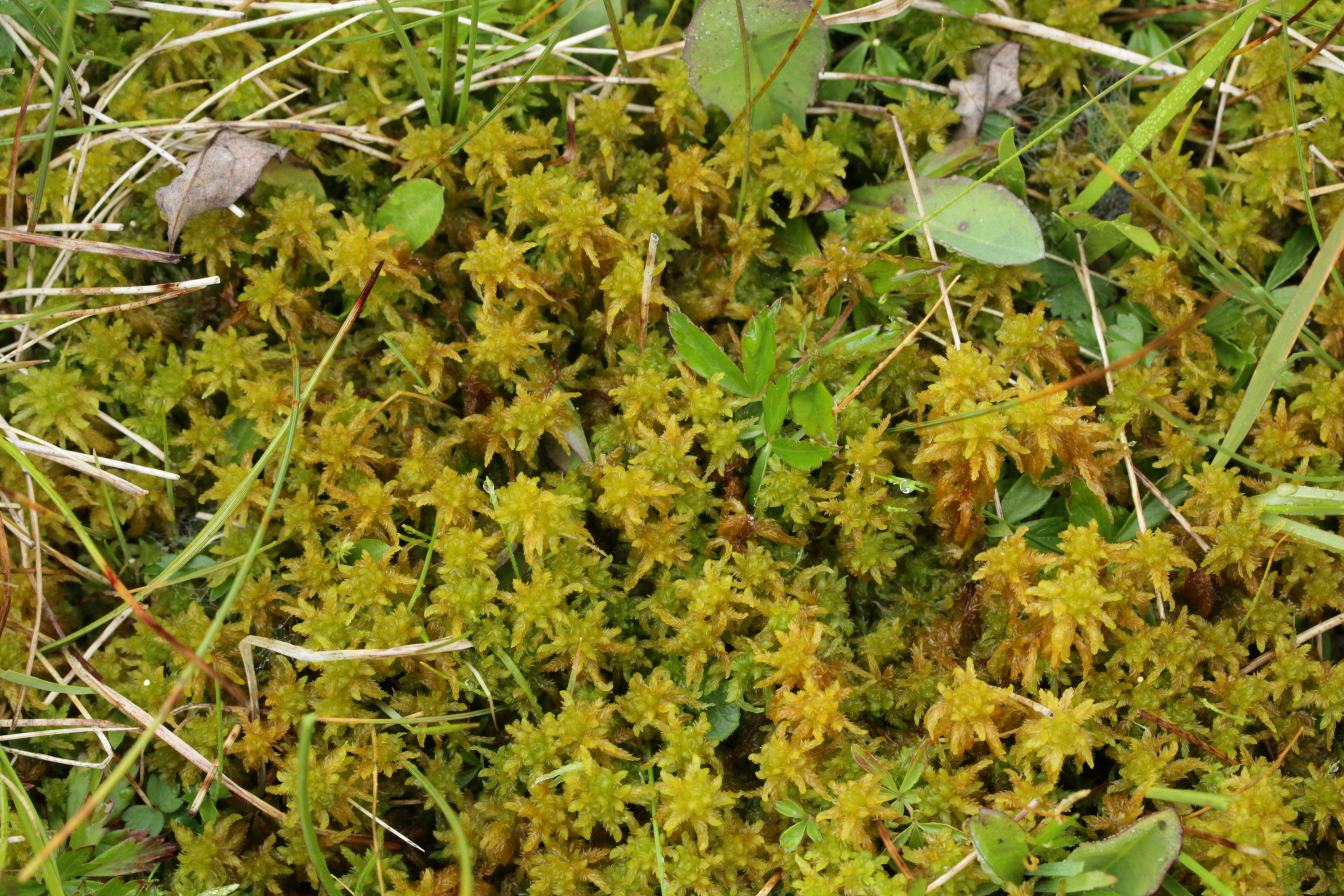
- In the Austrian Alps
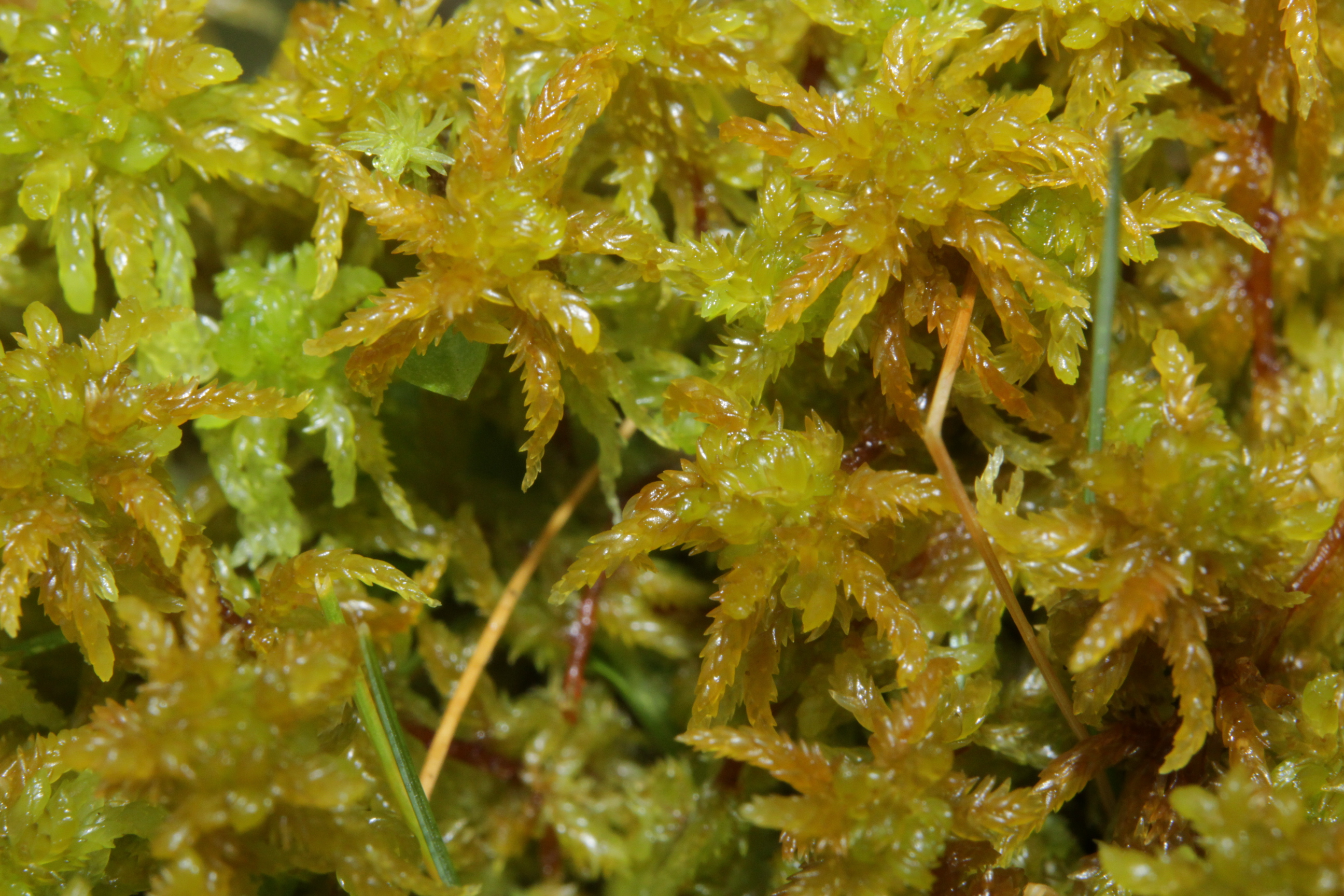
- Close-up

Scientific classification
- Kingdom: Plantae
- Division: Bryophyta
- Class: Sphagnopsida
- Order: Sphagnales
- Family: Sphagnaceae
- Genus: Sphagnum
- Species: S. subsecundum

Binomial name
- Sphagnum subsecundum Nees

Synonyms
- List: Sphagnum bakeri Warnst.; Sphagnum bostonense Warnst.; Sphagnum bushii Warnst. & Cardot; Sphagnum cavifolium var. subsecundum (Nees) Warnst.; Sphagnum cavifolium Warnst.; Sphagnum cochlearifolium Warnst.; Sphagnum cordifolium Warnst.; Sphagnum crispum R.E.Andrus; Sphagnum dasyphyllum Warnst.; Sphagnum fluitans Warnst.; Sphagnum franconiae Warnst.; Sphagnum langloisii Warnst.; Sphagnum laticoma Müll.Hal.; Sphagnum laticoma Müll.Hal. ex Warnst.; Sphagnum louisianae Warnst.; Sphagnum miyabeanum Warnst.; Sphagnum mobilense Warnst.; Sphagnum moorei Warnst.; Sphagnum nicholsii Warnst.; Sphagnum pseudobesum Roll; Sphagnum pseudosquarrosum Warnst.; Sphagnum simile Warnst.; Sphagnum smithianum Warnst.; Sphagnum submolliculum Warnst.; Sphagnum subsecundum var. ambiguum Roll; Sphagnum subsecundum var. compactum Bott.; Sphagnum subsecundum var. fluitans Hampe; Sphagnum subsecundum var. fuscescens (C.E.O.Jensen) Cardot; Sphagnum subsecundum var. gracile Müll.Hal.; Sphagnum subsecundum var. intermedium (Warnst.) Warnst.; Sphagnum subsecundum var. mesophyllum Röll; Sphagnum subsecundum var. microphyllum Warnst.; Sphagnum subsecundum var. monocladum (Warnst.) Bott.; Sphagnum subsecundum var. obesum (Wilson) Schimp.; Sphagnum subsecundum subsp. squarrosulum (Grav.) Husn.; Sphagnum subsecundum var. squarrosulum (Grav.) Husn.; Sphagnum subsecundum subsp. subsecundum; Sphagnum subsecundum var. subsecundum; Sphagnum subsecundum var. tenellum Schlieph.; Sphagnum subsecundum var. tenellum Schlieph. ex Röll; Sphagnum sullivanii Müll.Hal.; Sphagnum tenue Dozy & Molk.; Sphagnum validum Warnst.; Sphagnum variegatum De Not.; Sphagnum xerophilum Warnst.

= Sphagnum subsecundum =

Species of moss

Sphagnum subsecundum, the slender cow-horn bog-moss, is a species of moss in the family Sphagnaceae. It is the namesake of a species complex. The complex has a nearly worldwide distribution in wetlands, with the species proper found in Europe, eastern North America and North Africa (in the Tunisian Dar Fatma peatlands).

== Characteristics ==
This specific moss type can be described as a small and delicate bog-moss, typically with a golden-orange or yellow-brown colour, though it can appear as green in the shade. The branch leaves are generally under 1.2 mm in length and are asymmetrical on the lower parts. When viewed from above, they appear to be predominantly to one side, hence the characteristic curved appearance. The stem leaves are equilateral-triangular in shape and can be as short as 0.5 mm. The stems are typically dark brown in colour.

== Habitat ==
Sphagnum subsecundum predominantly occupies moderately nutrient-enriched wetland. It is commonly found in flushes, fens, ditches and swamps. It will occasionally appear in semi-submerged landscapes, such as areas that encounter winter flooding.
