= Souitir =

- Location in Tunisia
- Coordinates: 33°22.4′N 10°41.6′E
- Country: Tunisia
- Governorate: Medenine Governorate
- Time zone: UTC1 (CET)

Souitir is a small village in the south-east of Tunisia.

== Location ==
It is within the Medenine Governorate, approximately 20 kilometers from Medenine.

== Demographics ==
The number of inhabitants in Souitir has increased significantly during the last decade. Although the exact number is not known, it is estimated to be around 1000 inhabitants.

== Economy ==
The economic activity in Souitir is limited to agriculture.

== Infrastructure ==
Souitir has a primary school, a dispensary, and a mosque.
