= Hassi Amor =

Hassi Amor حسي عمر
- Location in Tunisia
- Coordinates: 33°22′N 10°37′E
- Country: Tunisia
- Governorate: Medenine Governorate
- Time zone: UTC1 (CET)

Hassi Amor is a small village situated in the southeast of Tunisia.

== Location ==
Located within the municipality of Medenine, it is located 56 kilometers away from its center, near the National Road N1 so anyone going to Jerba, Zarzis or Ben Guerden, which are the main three big towns in Medenine, should pass through this small village.

== Demographics ==
The number of the village is not known exactly, but it varies from 2000 to 3000 maximum.

== Economy ==
Its main activity is agriculture with olive trees, wheat, vegetable and fruits.

== Infrastructure ==
It has three primary schools and a college. There is football club called Avenir Sportif De Hassi Amor ASHA), but it no longer exists except for children, and is run by the famous football player Bak Ahmed Showatt.

== Notable people ==
Mohamed Hamdi, politician and member of the Constituent Assembly of Tunisia (b. 1971)
