= Medenine =

Medenine مدنين
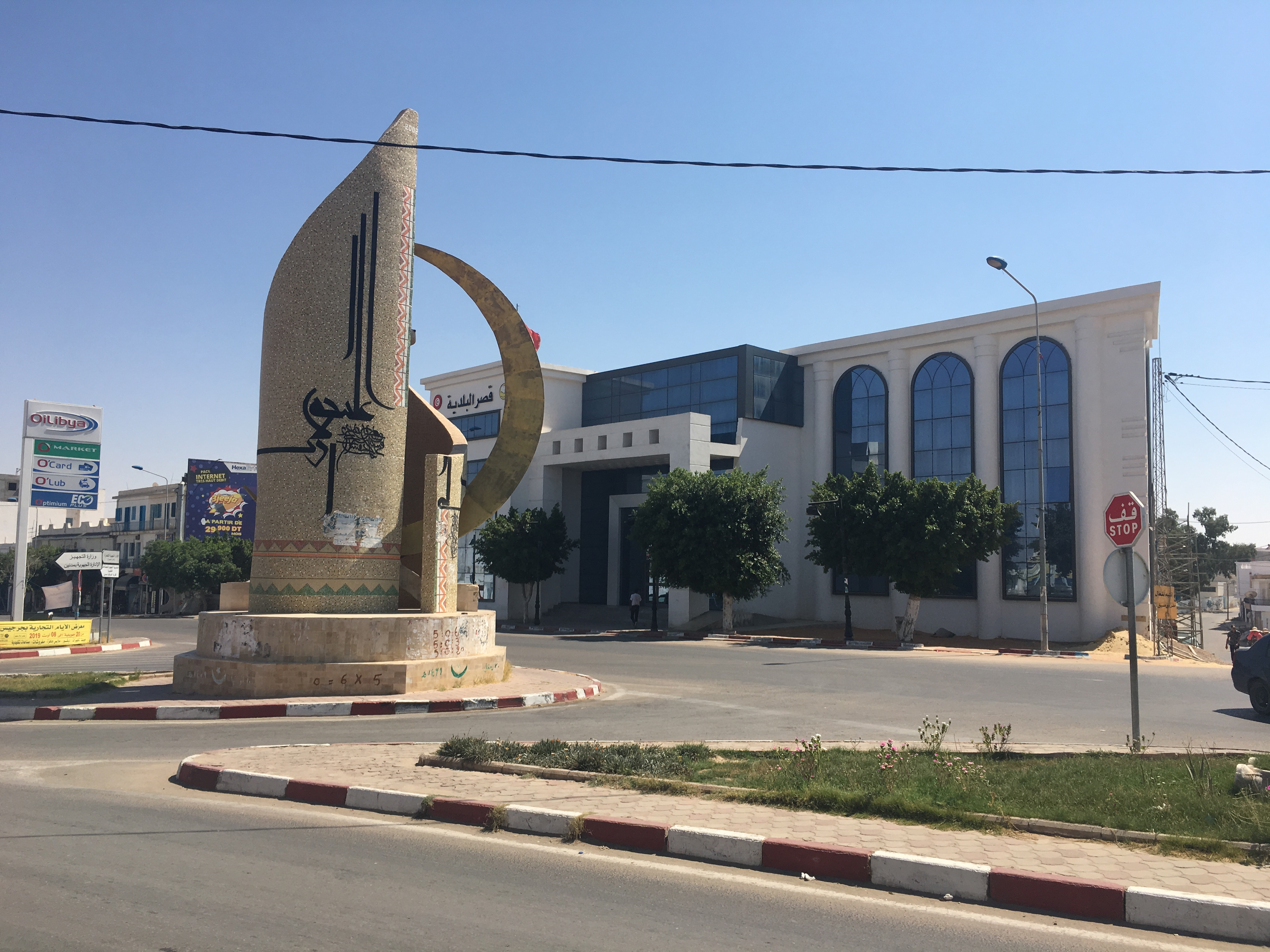
- Town Hall of Medenine

- Location in Tunisia
- Coordinates: 33°21′17″N 010°30′19″E
- Country: Tunisia
- Governorate: Medenine Governorate
- Delegation(s): Medenine North, Medenine South

Government
  - Mayor: Moncef Ben Yemna (Ennahda)

Population (2022)
  - City: 79,406
  - Metro: 522,294
- Time zone: UTC1 (CET)

Medenine (Arabic: مدنين Mednin) is the major town in south-eastern Tunisia, 77 kilometres (48 mi) south of the port of Gabès and the Island of Djerba, on the main route to Libya. It is the capital of Medenine Governorate.

== Overview ==
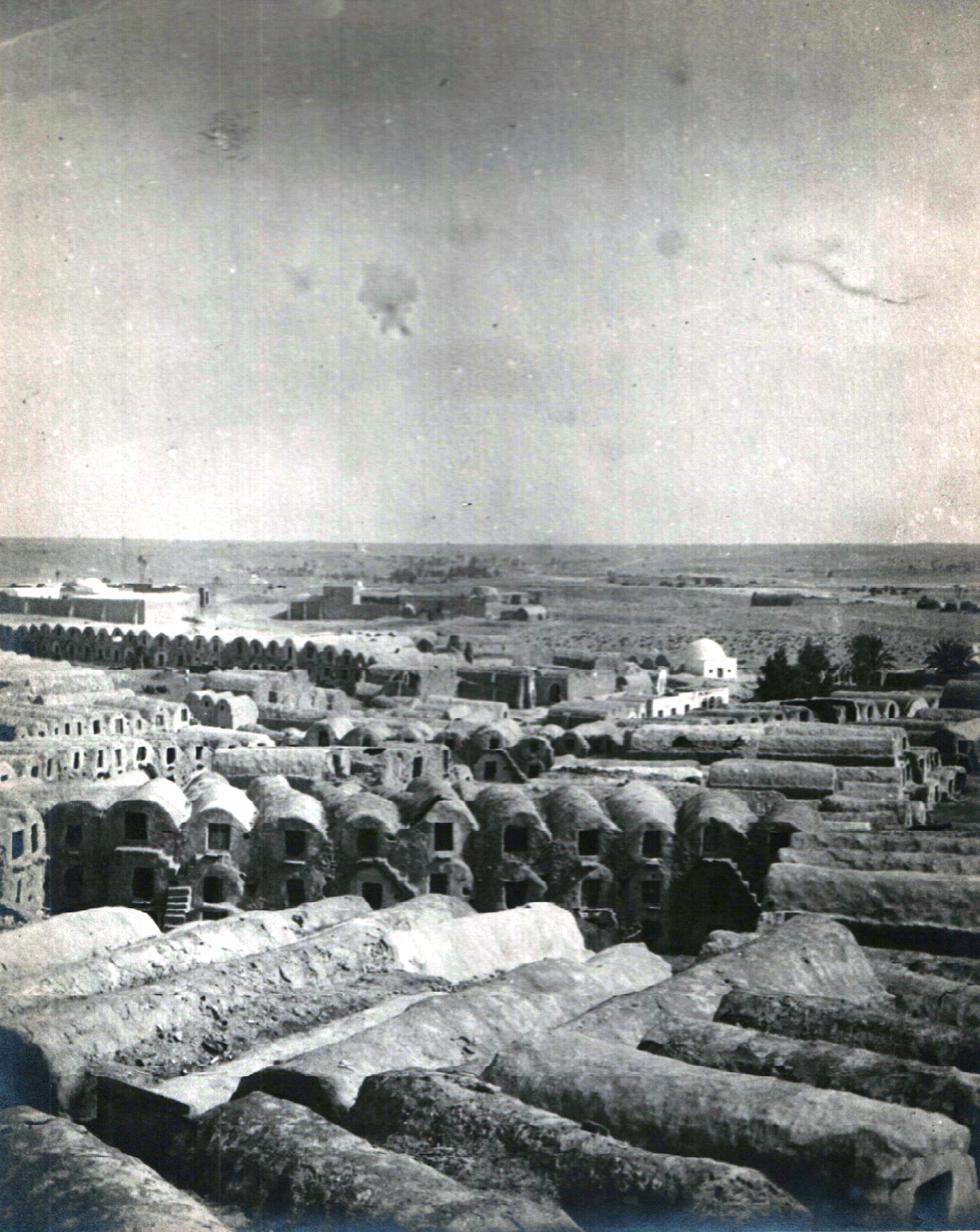
Panorama of Medenine

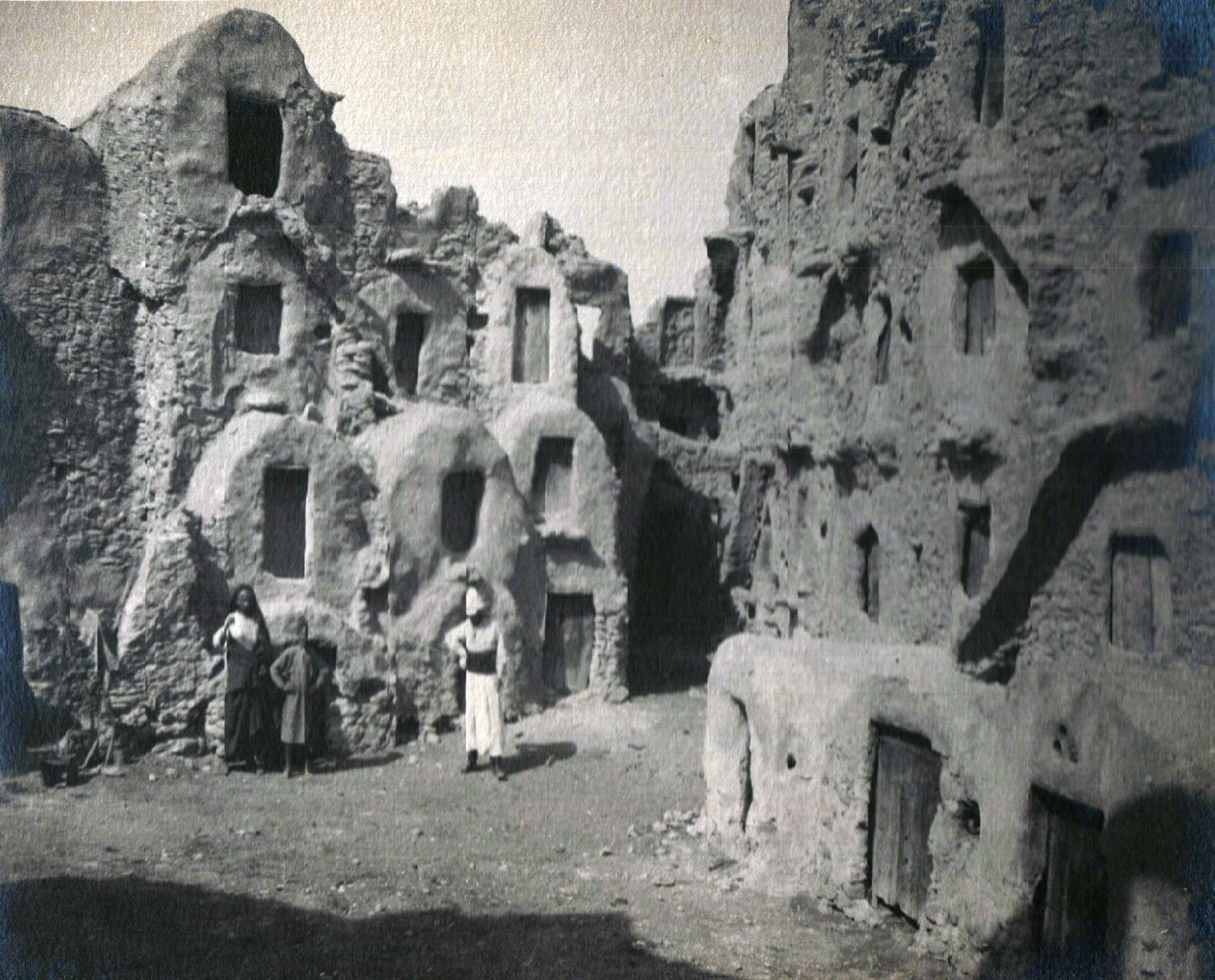

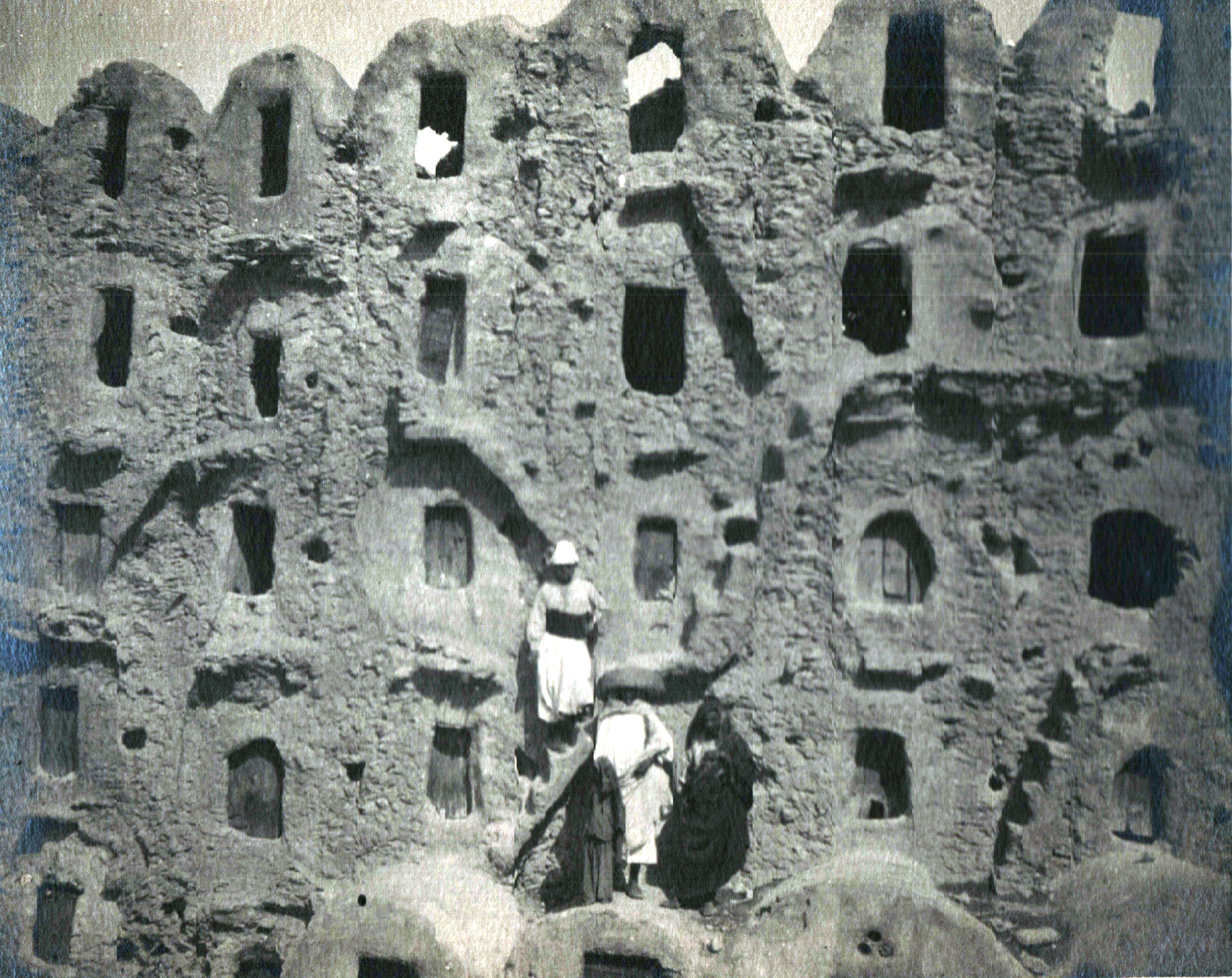

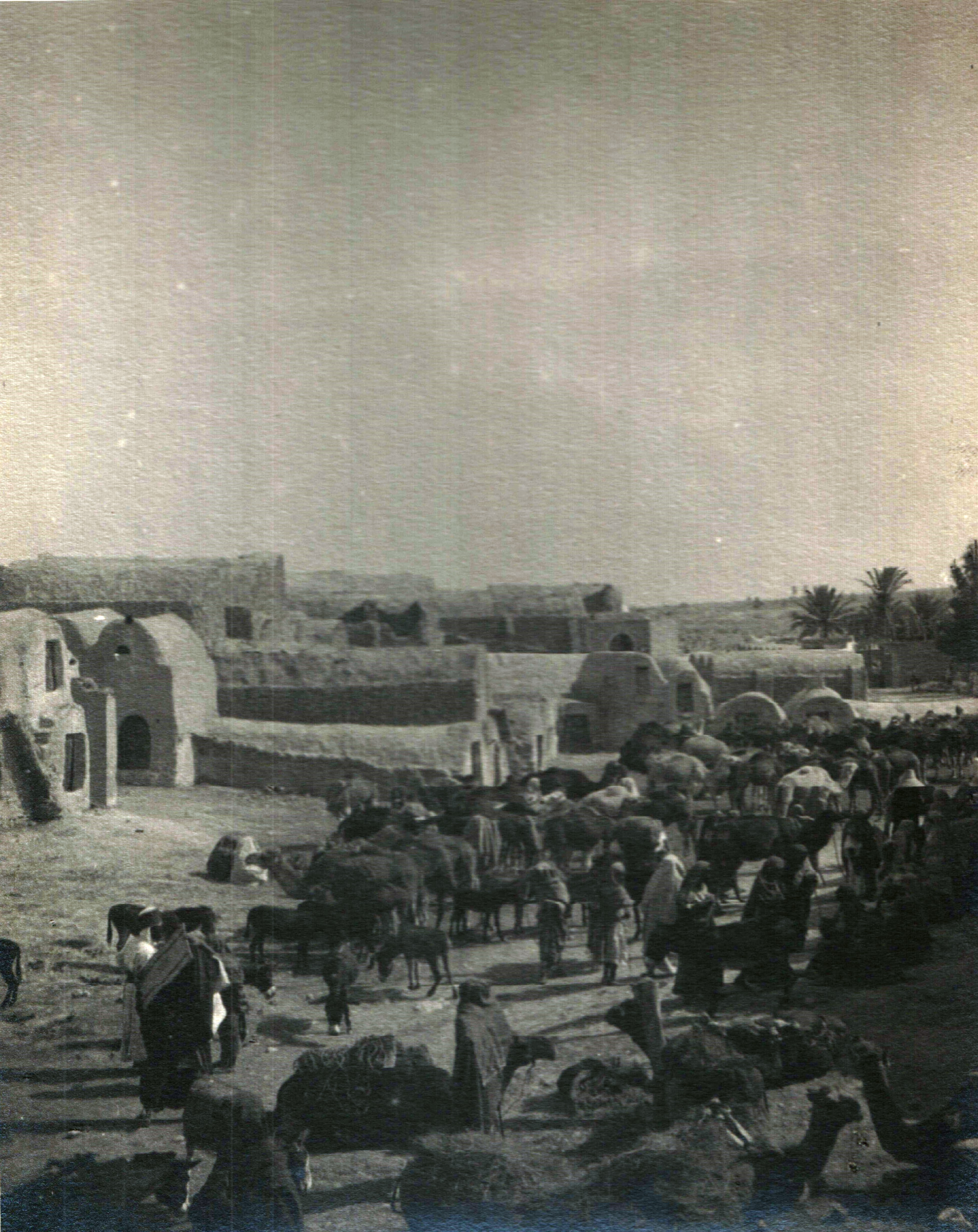
Market in Medenine

In pre-colonial times, Medenine was already the most important trading centre in the south, attracting merchants from all over North Africa and even from Bornu, to the south of the Sahara. The Ksar housed the central granaries of the various nomadic Berber tribes of the region.

The area was the scene of an unsuccessful German counter-attack by General Erwin Rommel as part of Operation Capri during March 1943 against British Eighth Army forces. The Battle of Medenine was Rommel's last engagement in Africa before he was replaced by General Hans-Jürgen von Arnim as commander of the Afrika Korps.

== Climate ==
Climate data for Medenine (1991–2020, extremes 1968–2023)
Month	Jan	Feb	Mar	Apr	May	Jun	Jul	Aug	Sep	Oct	Nov	Dec	Year
Record high °C (°F)	33.8 (92.8)	36.3 (97.3)	39.1 (102.4)	40.5 (104.9)	43.9 (111.0)	47.2 (117.0)	48.1 (118.6)	47.7 (117.9)	48.5 (119.3)	44.3 (111.7)	36.4 (97.5)	31.4 (88.5)	48.5 (119.3)
Mean daily maximum °C (°F)	17.9 (64.2)	19.2 (66.6)	22.6 (72.7)	26.2 (79.2)	30.1 (86.2)	33.9 (93.0)	36.8 (98.2)	37.2 (99.0)	33.8 (92.8)	29.7 (85.5)	23.7 (74.7)	18.9 (66.0)	27.5 (81.5)
Daily mean °C (°F)	12.8 (55.0)	13.7 (56.7)	16.8 (62.2)	20.0 (68.0)	23.8 (74.8)	27.4 (81.3)	30.0 (86.0)	30.7 (87.3)	28.1 (82.6)	24.1 (75.4)	18.4 (65.1)	14.0 (57.2)	21.7 (71.1)
Mean daily minimum °C (°F)	7.6 (45.7)	8.3 (46.9)	11.1 (52.0)	13.9 (57.0)	17.4 (63.3)	20.8 (69.4)	23.3 (73.9)	24.1 (75.4)	22.4 (72.3)	18.5 (65.3)	13.1 (55.6)	9.1 (48.4)	15.8 (60.4)
Record low °C (°F)	−0.5 (31.1)	−1.0 (30.2)	−0.5 (31.1)	3.1 (37.6)	7.0 (44.6)	10.5 (50.9)	13.2 (55.8)	14.2 (57.6)	12.0 (53.6)	4.5 (40.1)	1.3 (34.3)	−2.0 (28.4)	−2.0 (28.4)
Average precipitation mm (inches)	18.2 (0.72)	16.6 (0.65)	25.7 (1.01)	10.0 (0.39)	5.8 (0.23)	4.7 (0.19)	0.3 (0.01)	2.2 (0.09)	19.6 (0.77)	26.4 (1.04)	22.7 (0.89)	22.5 (0.89)	174.8 (6.88)
Average precipitation days (≥ 1.0 mm)	2.7	2.5	2.9	1.9	1.2	0.3	0.0	0.3	1.9	2.4	2.0	3.2	21.3
Average relative humidity (%)	59	56	57	56	55	55	54	57	63	64	62	61	58
Mean monthly sunshine hours	203.7	213.6	239.9	247.8	289.2	313.8	319.2	324.4	266.8	236.8	211.0	203.7	3,069.9
Source 1: Institut National de la Météorologie (humidity 1961-1990, sun 1981–2010) (Note: The Station ID for Medenine is 57070111.)
Source 2: NOAA

== In popular culture ==
- Part of the town was used as a location for the 1999 US science fiction film Star Wars: Episode I – The Phantom Menace.

== See also ==
- Hassi Amor
- Souitir
