= Ralia =

Ralia was a 19th-century Berber ruler in Zarzis, belonging to the Accara tribe. She is mentioned in the writings of Aimable Pélissier.

== Career ==
During her rule, Ralia governed a territory extending from Zarzis to Bahiret el Biban.

Colonel Aimable Pélissier, who saw Ralia governing Zarzis, described her as a beautiful and brave woman. He added that she played an important role during the unrest in Tripoli, Libya, fighting among soldiers and demonstrating courage. Finally, he compared her to Myrnia and to the Berber queen Kahina.
