= Hafsid conquest of Djerba =

Date	1335
Location	Djerba
Result	Hafsid victory

Belligerents
Hafsid Dynasty; Supported by: Republic of Genoa; Kingdom of Naples	Kingdom of Sicily; Republic of Pisa

Commanders and leaders
Makhlouf Ibn Hamed; Robert, King of Naples	Frederick III of Sicily

Strength
Unknown	5 galleys

Casualties and losses
Unknown	High

Around 1335, the Hafsids gained control on the island of Djerba, taking it from the Kingdom of Sicily following an uprising of its inhabitants.

== Background ==
In 1284, the island was conquered by the Kingdom of Sicily through a military campaign led by Roger of Lauria, who took thousands of captives. This was followed in 1289 by the construction of the island’s main fortress, Bordj al-Qashtil, built by the Crown of Aragon. The first recorded hostilities with the Hafsids occurred in 1306, during an expedition led by a Hafsid prince and accompanied by the scholar Abdallah al-Tijani, aimed at recapturing the island from the Christians. The expedition ended in complete failure.

== The expedition ==
The inhabitants of Djerba revolted against the rule of the Kingdom of Sicily, with the support of the Hafsids. In response, King Frederick III of Sicily dispatched five galleys to aid the Christian forces on the island. However, the fleet was intercepted and halted near the coast of Ifriqiya by a Genoese-Calabrian naval force commanded by Robert of Naples. Meanwhile, on land, a Hafsid army led by Makhlouf ibn Hamed landed on Djerba, successfully captured the fortress of al-Qashtil, and defeated the Sicilian forces. The governor of the fortress was stoned to death, and his soldiers were taken into slavery.

== Aftermath ==
The future of Djerba remained uncertain for decades. Relations between the Hafsids and the Republic of Genoa deteriorated due to repeated acts of piracy, eventually leading to open conflict. In 1388, Djerba was pillaged by Genoese forces, and in 1432 it was again sacked, this time by the Crown of Aragon.
