= Dar Fatma peatlands =

Nature reserve in Tunisia

The Dar Fatma peatlands (Arabic: مستنقعات دار فاطمة, French: Les Tourbières de Dar Fatma) are a natural site located at an altitude of 780 m in the Jendouba Governorate, northwestern Tunisia, covering an area of fifteen hectares.

It was classified as a nature reserve in 1993 and a Ramsar site on 7 November 2007.

The protected site was created to preserve the unique flora's biotope. Additionally, the peat, by preserving trapped and fossilized pollen and spores, provides unique scientific information about the dynamics and functioning of ecosystems that have succeeded one another for nearly 33,000 years. The Dar Fatma peatland has no known equivalent elsewhere in North Africa and constitutes a "climatic and paleobotanical archive box.

According to local legend, the name Dar Fatma (House of Fatma in Arabic) comes from the story of a young Roman bride who drowned or got stuck in the wetland. The origin of the name shows a long-standing and deep recognition of the area's wet nature.

== Peatlands ==
=== Environment ===
The main Dar Fatma site consists of five peatlands. The site is surrounded by forests, but the peatlands themselves are in a wet clearing located in the Mouzoued Louize wadi watershed. The individual peatlands are limited in size, with diameters ranging from two to eight meters and depths not exceeding ten meters.

The main site, which is surrounded by a fence, is classified as a nature reserve. A second, less well-preserved clearing downstream contains two other peatlands. This second clearing is not part of the nature reserve but is included in the Ramsar site.

The water at the bottom of the peatlands has a neutral pH with a tendency towards acidity. The site is only submerged during the winter due to heavy rainfall. Winter rainfall is significant (around 1,500 mm per year, making it the wettest region in Tunisia), and summers are dry but mild (with an average annual temperature of 18 °C).

The Dar Fatma site has been the subject of very detailed palynological studies. Deep core samples, reaching up to ten meters, have provided insights dating back approximately 33,000 years, allowing scientists to study the evolution of vegetation in the Kroumirie region since that time. This is the only peatland in the Mediterranean and North Africa to have been studied in such detail, providing continuous results over such a long, uninterrupted period.

=== Specific Flora ===
The peatlands are home to grasses and a series of aquatic plants that are found almost nowhere else in Tunisia, including the highly localized sphagnum mosses: Sphagnum subsecundum (also called Sphagnum auriculatum) and Sphagnum plumulosum (or S. subnitens). These live in association with other aquatic plants such as Eleocharis multicaulis, Bellis annua, Montia fontana, Hypericum afrum, Anagallis crassipes, branched asphodel (Asphodelus microcarpus or ramosus), and Isoetes histrix.

Long ago, the Dar Fatma site was a much wetter environment, covered in water and encircled by a forest of zean oaks. At higher elevations, this forest also included cedars and firs, reflecting a colder and more humid climate.

Over time, the climate has become drier, and the vegetation has changed significantly. Cork oaks have gradually replaced the zean oaks. Other species like Alnus glutinosa, Salix pedicellata, and common ash (Fraxinus excelsior) have disappeared because the site has progressively dried out. Today, you'll find heathers and large ferns growing all around the area.

== Surrounding Forest and Fauna ==
=== Fauna ===
The area surrounding the peatlands is a degraded forest of cork oaks (Quercus suber), with scattered zean oaks (Quercus faginea) enriching it in some places. The presence of these isolated zean oaks is a testament to the dominant role they once played in the regional vegetation. The current spread of the cork oak, at the expense of the zean oak, is due to anthropozoogenic action (human and animal-related influences).

The undergrowth is populated by myrtles, heathers, brooms, and strawberry trees. The region is also known for its mushrooms, such as chanterelles and porcini mushrooms (Boletus edulis), and orchids, including the aborted-leaf limodore and the rare Serapias stenopetala.

=== Mammals ===
The Kroumirie forest was home to the last large felines in Tunisia. The last Atlas lion was killed in Babouch in 1891, the last panther in 1925, and the last leopards disappeared from the Kroumirie region in the early 20th century. The serval also seems to have disappeared from the area since the 1930s.

The forest is home to the Barbary stag (Cervus elaphus barbarus), as well as wild boar (Sus scrofa) and the red fox (Vulpes vulpes). More rarely, one can also encounter the jackal, Egyptian mongoose (Herpestes ichneumon), hare, and wildcat.

=== Birds ===
The surrounding Kroumirie forest is home to many Palearctic nesting bird species, which find the southern limit of their range here.

Three species of woodpeckers are present, including the Levaillant's woodpecker (Picus vaillantii), a species endemic to North Africa.

The woodlark is also found here, as is an endemic subspecies of the European robin, Erithacus rubecula witherbyi.

The forest further hosts the mistle thrush (Turdus viscivorus), the melodious warbler (Hippolais polyglotta), which has been observed nesting at Dar Fatma, likely at the eastern limit of its North African range, and the Atlas flycatcher (Ficedula speculigera), another endemic species. Other birds present are the coal tit (Parus ater) and the Eurasian jay (Garrulus glandarius), which is an endemic subspecies.

By the end of the year, several wintering species arrive, such as the Eurasian woodcock (Scolopax rusticola) and the common wood pigeon (Columba palumbus).
