= Arosyat Al-Naloti =

Tunisian scholar and screenwriter

- Born: 1950 (age 75–76); Djerba, Tunisia
- Occupations: Novelist; journalist; screenwriter
- Notable work: Touch The Fifth Dimension

Arosyat Al-Naloti (Arabic: عروسية النالوتي) is a Tunisian scholar and screenwriter. She was born in 1950 Djerba. She wrote the novel Touch, one of the best 100 Arabic novels.

== Biography ==
She did her primary, secondary, and higher education in Tunis. She got her degree in Arabic language and literature in 1975. After graduating, she taught in secondary schools. She also worked in the journalistic field and produced many radio programs. She wrote newspaper articles, short stories, novels, and plays. And wrote many literary studies. Member of the story club and Tunisian writers union. She published an article about the role of women in society in L'Action Tunisienne, only for her writings now to be published in a plethora of newspapers and magazines.

== Selected writings ==
- The Fifth Dimension – a collection of short stories – 1975.
- Your Wife – novel – 1985
- Juha – Attack of the ants on the village of figs and olives – children's stories – 1974.
- Touch – novel – 1995.

== Screenplays ==
She contributed in writing Tunisian movie scenarios:

- Khochkhach, directed by Salma Baccar (2006).
- Thirty, directed by Fadhel Jaziri (2008).
