= Ruwayfi ibn Thabit =

Umayyad commander

Ruwayfi ibn Thabit al-Ansari (7th century) was the deputy commander of Tripoli for the Egypt-based Umayyad commander Mu'awiya ibn Hudayj. He led the Muslim raid against the Byzantine controlled island of Djerba in modern Tunisia. He may have led a second raid against Djerba alongside the Ansarite Fadala ibn Ubayd.

== Bibliography ==
- Kaegi, Walter E. (2010). Muslim Expansion and Byzantine Collapse in North Africa. Cambridge: Cambridge University Press. ISBN 978-0-521-19677-2.
