= Ben Gardane Delegation =

Ben Gardane Delegation معتمدية بنقردان
- Delegation
- Location in Tunisia
- Coordinates: 33°8′20″N 11°13′0″E
- Country: Tunisia
- Created: June 21, 1956
- Capital: Ben Gardane City

Area
  - Total: 4,732 km^{2} (1,827 sq mi)

Population (2014)
  - Total: 79,912
  - Density: 16.89/km^{2} (43.74/sq mi)
- Time zone: UTC+1 (CET)
  - Summer (DST): UTC+2 (CEST)
- Postal prefix: 4160

Ben Gardane Delegation (معتمدية بنقردان, Mutamadiyat Bin Guirdan; French: Ben Gardane délégation) is a delegation (county) of the Medenine Governorate in Southeastern Tunisia. As of 2014 census it had a population of 79,912. It is close to the border with Libya. It is located at around 33°8′20″N 11°13′0″E.

There is one town (municipality) in the Ben Gardane Delegation, Ben Gardane city.

== Geography ==
The Delegation encompasses the south-easternmost coastal strip, totalling 4732 km^{2} and had a population of 79,912 at the 2014 census. The capital is Ben Gardane city.

== Administrative divisions ==
The Delegation is divided into twelve imadas (with their populations at the 2014 Census):

| Imadat | Population (2014) | area |
|---|---|---|
| Ben Gardane Nord | 6,708 | 8 km^{2} |
| Ben Gardane Sud | 7,160 | 7 km^{2} |
| Essayah | 8,312 | 170 km^{2} |
| Jamila | 6,173 | 155 km^{2} |
| El Moamarat | 7,038 | 482 km^{2} |
| El Amria | 9,970 | 1600 km^{2} |
| Ettabaï | 6,886 | 1078 km^{2} |
| Jallel | 11,739 | 98 km^{2} |
| Ouersnia | 8,421 | 137 km^{2} |
| Chareb Errajel | 4,108 | 135 km^{2} |
| Neffatia | 996 | 375 km^{2} |
| Chahbania | 2,401 | 487 km^{2} |
| Total | 79,912 | 4732,0 km^{2} |
