= Babouch =

- Village
- Location in Tunisia
- Coordinates: 36°48′N 8°40′E
- Country: Tunisia
- Governorate: Jendouba Governorate
- Time zone: UTC1 (CET)

Babouch (ببوش) is a village in northwestern Tunisia in the Jendouba Governorate, situated 25 kilometers south of Tabarka.
