= Ahmed Eyadh Ouederni =

Tunisian politician

Ahmed Eyadh Ouederni is a Tunisian politician. He was the Minister-Director of the Presidential Cabinet under former President Zine El Abidine Ben Ali.
