= Djerba =

Island off of the coast of Tunisia

Native name: Ǧerba جربة (Jirba) Μῆνιγξ (Meninx) Nickname: "The Island of Dreams"
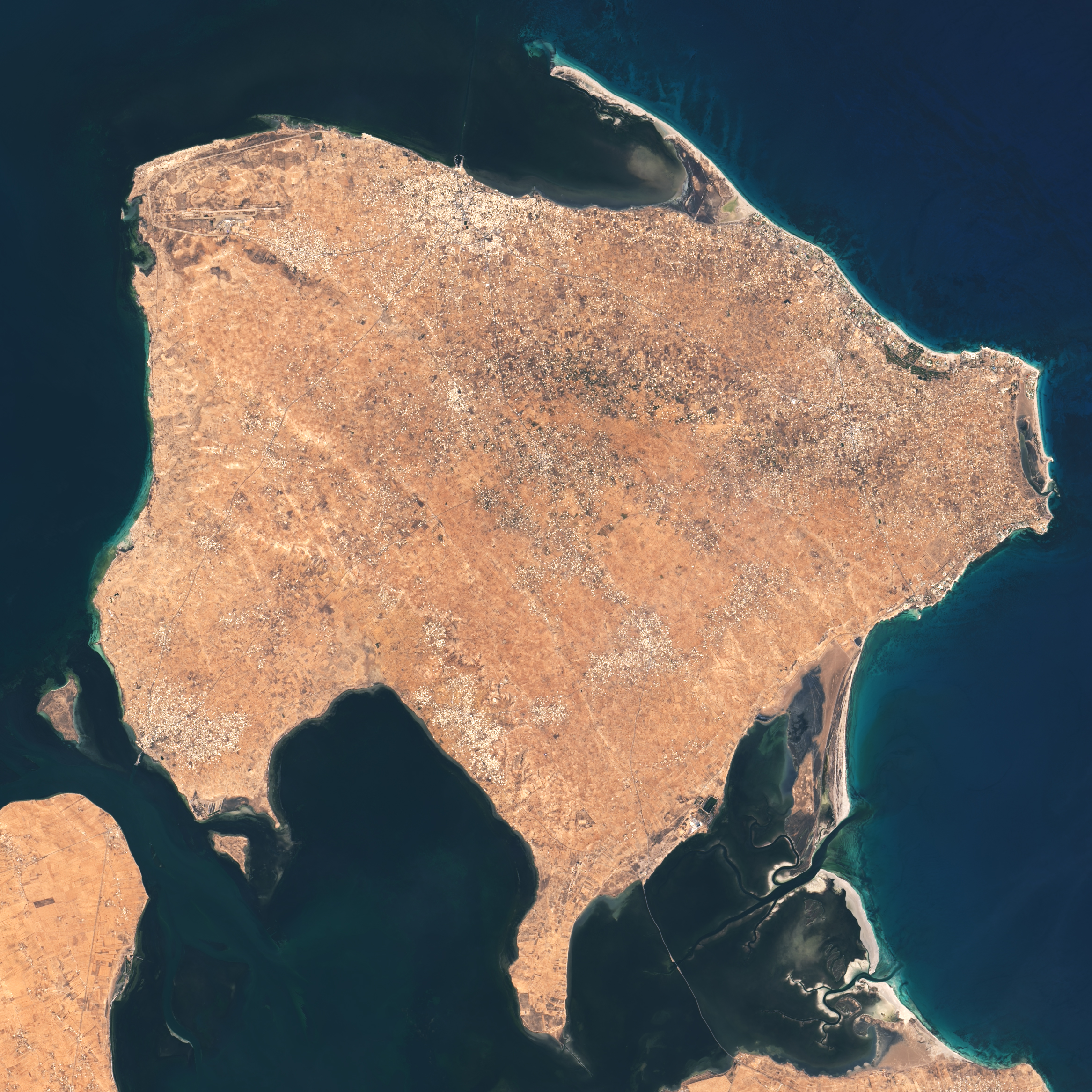
- Satellite image of Djerba

- Location within Tunisia

Geography
- Location: Gulf of Gabès, Mediterranean Sea
- Coordinates: 33°48′N 10°53′E
- Type: Continental
- Area: 514 km^{2} (198 sq mi)
- Length: 27 km (16.8 mi)
- Width: 26 km (16.2 mi)
- Coastline: 125 km (77.7 mi)
- Highest elevation: 20 m (70 ft)
- Highest point: 53 Dhahret Guellala

Administration
- Tunisia
- Governorate: Medenine
- Largest settlement: Houmt Souk (pop. 79,000 (2023 estimate))

Demographics
- Demonym: Djerbian, Jerbi
- Population: 184,000 (2023 estimate) (2023)
- Pop. density: 358/km^{2} (927/sq mi)
- Languages: Arabic (official language), Tunisian Arabic (Spoken language), Berber, French
- Ethnic groups: Tunisians (Arabs, Berbers, Jews)

UNESCO World Heritage Site
- Official name: Djerba: Testimony to a settlement pattern in an island territory
- Type: Cultural
- Criteria: v
- Designated: 2023 (45th session)
- Reference no.: 1640

Djerba (/ˈdʒɜːrbə, ˈdʒɛərbə/; Arabic: جربة, romanized: Jirba, IPA: [ˈʒɪrbæ]; Berber languages: Ǧerba; Italian: Meninge, Girba), also transliterated as Jerba or Jarbah, is a Tunisian island and the largest island of North Africa at 514 square kilometers (198 sq mi), in the Gulf of Gabès, off the coast of Tunisia. Administratively, it is part of the Medenine Governorate. The island had a population of 139,544 at the 2004 census, which rose to 163,726 at the 2014 census. Citing its long and unique history, Tunisia has sought UNESCO World Heritage status protections for the island, and, in 2023, Djerba was officially designated a World Heritage Site.

== History ==
Djerba is the French spelling of Jerba or Jirba. Haynes noted in his original 1947 publication, the present archaeological evidence regarding the Palaeolithic inhabitants of Tunisia and North Africa etc which confirmed that the people who lived there through all stages of the Stone Age—Palaeolithic, Mesolithic, and Neolithic—were the ancient Libyan people known as the Tehenu, who appear in the records of the Old Kingdom of Egypt.

Djerba is speculated to have been the island of the lotus-eaters where Odysseus was stranded on his voyage through the Mediterranean Sea. Djerba was known as the island of Lytos or Meninx in the time of the Ancient Greeks. It was possible to locate one of its villages from the Qantara Tower, and the name Djerba was given to the area near Houmt Souk.

=== Antiquity ===
Archaeological and genetic evidence show that the ancestors of the Berbers, the indigenous people of North Africa, have been there since the end of the last Ice Age, and can be traced back more than 20,000 years. There is evidence of various lifestyles:

- Farmers living on the coasts and mountains, dwelling in caves and houses carved or built from stones and mud, or straw and tree branches in the form of huts on top of the mountains and plateaus
- Nomads, travelling with their livestock and tents.
- Some are thought to have relied on plunder for their
- Some lived in populous cities, according to Ibn Khaldun, who says in Part One of his history – 8 of 258:
  ″Ifriqiya and the Maghreb, when the Banu Hilal and Banu Sulaym crossed into it at the beginning of the fifth century (hijri) and invaded it for three hundred and fifty years, were destroyed and all of its areas returned to ruin, after the entire area between the Sudan and the Roman Sea had been built up, as evidenced by the traces of construction in it, including monuments, building statues, and evidence of villages and homes.″

Their clothing consists of striped woolen fabric and a black robe. They wear a cordon and a robe. They shave their heads and do not cover them with anything, and they cover their faces with a sham, which is still in practice today. They eat koski, speak and write Challah (specifically the Djerba dialect), and some people, especially in southern Tunisia, such as in the mountains of Matmata and Doueirat, still use this language when communicating: it is a distinct language in itself, known from ancient times and frequent until now, and it has its own popular oral literature.

Djerba was settled by different people in antiquity, first by the Greek and later by the Phoenicians in the 12th century BC. who came from Tyre and Sidon. During this period, trade flourished in Djerba, thus spreading the pottery industry and the manufacture of purple dye, which historians mentioned was comparable to, if not superior to, the purple of Tyre, and was sold at the highest prices. It seems clear that the Phoenicians were the ones who introduced the planting of olive trees, thus spreading the industry of olive pressing.

After the Phoenicians came the Romans, and the island witnessed great prosperity during the Roman era, the urban effects of which still indicate it today. In the fifth century, the Vandals, a Germanic tribe who had emigrated to the Maghreb in 429 AD and conquered the island under the leadership of its king, Gaiseric.

=== Middle Ages ===
==== Islamic conquest ====
During the Early Muslim conquests by the Arabs, Djerba was among the places included in the Arab conquest at the hands of Ruwayfi ibn Thabit al-Ansari in the year 665 during the invasion of Tunisia by Mu'awiya ibn Hudaij, in which the Ibadi sect prevailed.

Then it became "Ifriqiya" after its conquest under the rule of the governors, and their reign lasted for nearly a century from 716 to 800. The state went through several disturbances until the Aghlabid state, which was in dispute with the Rustumid state in Algeria. Djerba was sometimes subordinate to the Aghlabids and sometimes to the Rustamids, but it was always semi-independent, until the establishment of the Fatimid Caliphate, which controlled the area from 909 to 972. The island then became part of the possession of emir Bulukīn ibn Zīrī al-Sanhaji, whom al-Mu'izz li-Din Allah al-Fatimi appointed as ruler of Ifriqiya after the Fatimids moved their capital to Cairo.

The Sanhaji state went through two successive stages: an era of prosperity and an era of turmoil. In the first stage, Kairouan experienced prosperity for 78 years until the arrival of the Hilalids in the year 1049. As for the second stage, Djerba suffered many calamities due to the invasions it was exposed to. Perhaps the most prominent of these was when “Rogar al-Narmandi”, conquered the stronghold in 1135 in response to repeated piracy in the Mediterranean. After its subjugation, the town's women and children were sent to Sicily, despite the violent resistance shown by the pirate lords and local folk. Djerba remained under Norman occupation from 1135 to 1159. Over two decades later however, while the Normans and their ruler William I, were primarily focused on their invasion of the Byzantine Empire in 1185, the Almohad Caliphate, with its origins in the sandy deserts of Morocco, "woke up from its slumber and remembered that its enemy was sitting on a cherished piece of its soil. It prepared a large army in a huge fleet, forced the Frankish garrison to withdraw, and the island entered the rule of the Almohads." The control of the island later passed down to the Berber Hafsid dynasty by early 13th century.

==== From the sixteenth to the nineteenth century ====
The Ottomans entered a part of Ifriqiya in 1574 and made it an Ottoman province, similar to what they did in the Central Maghreb in 1519–1520 and in Tripolitania in 1551. However, this Tunisian province, which was formed at a later date, soon developed its political system before its Algerian and Tripolitan neighbors since the late 16th century. At that time, the rule of the Dey with sole authority appeared (in the first half of the 17th century), then a semi-monarchical hereditary system during the era of the Muradid Beys (1628–1702) and then the Husseinis (after 1705). These Husseinis succeeded in building the edifice of a state firmly established in the country and enjoying broad independence from external powers (Istanbul or the Dey of Algiers), especially during the reign of Hammuda Pasha (1782–1814).

The two giant empires—the Ottoman and the Spanish—took advantage of the weakness of the Hafsid state to intervene in Tunisia from 1534 to 1535. In addition to the island of Djerba, Darguth Pasha was able to occupy Gafsa in 1556 and Kairouan (the capital of the Almoravid Emirate of Chabia) in 1557, and the Bayler Bey (Supreme Commander) "Ali Pasha" or "Alaj Ali" entered the city of Tunis. In 1569, before the Spanish evacuated him from it in 1573.

The Ottoman Sultan Selim II decided to eradicate the Spaniards from Tunisia for strategic reasons (monitoring the southern bank of the Strait of Sicily), political reasons (completed the occupation of the countries of this bank from Egypt to the borders of the Far Maghreb), and religious reasons (jihad was one of the constants of Ottoman policy). With the help of the people, the Ottomans were able to storm the huge fortress of La Goulette, then seize Tunis and eliminate the Spanish presence during the summer of 1574.

The modern era opened with a deep crisis in all Maghrebian countries, including Tunisia, which ended with the Ottomans' accession there and its transformation into an Ottoman province.

However, its political system quickly developed during the seventeenth and eighteenth centuries into an independent "semi-national monarchy" with only formal ties of loyalty to Istanbul. They control (varyingly according to the regions and groups) a specific space that is different from the space of the neighbouring provinces.

Then Tunisia fell into the trap of colonialism, as German Chancellor Bismarck declared to the French ambassador in Berlin (January 4, 1879): "The Tunisian pear has ripened and it is time for you to pick it". Indeed, since the first third of the nineteenth century, the conditions of the Tunisian province have gradually deteriorated and worsened under the pressure of the rising European expansionist powers, until the province stabilized in a comprehensive crisis that facilitated the French intervention in 1881.

During the nineteenth and twentieth centuries, the island witnessed radical transformations, and perhaps the most prominent thing that distinguishes this era is the migration of its people to engage in trade in some Islamic cities and Tunisian cities. During the period of French rule, the people of the island had an effective contribution to the Tunisian national movement. Following independence, Djerba became one of the most prominent Tunisian tourist attractions and a destination for tourists from all over the world.

=== Since 1881 ===
The island was subjected to attacks by Ibrahim Pasha of Egypt. It was also damaged as a result of Yunus Bey's invasion of it in the year 1738 AD, and it was damaged by the epidemics of 1705 and 1706, 1809, 1864, and its economy was greatly damaged, then it suffered under the yoke of French colonialism in 1881 AD, until it gained its independence in 1956 AD.

==== Demands to become a "Tunisian Governorate" ====
The island of Djerba is administratively affiliated with the governorate of Medenine, but some people on the island have been demanding since the January 2011 revolution for secession from the governorate of Medenine and for Djerba to become the twenty-fifth Tunisian governorate, which did not resonate with Tunisian officials.

In 2000, the film The Season of Men, directed by Moufida Tlatli and depicting women's lives on Djerba, achieved critical success.

=== Jewish history ===
According to their oral history, the Jewish minority has lived on the island continuously for more than 2,500 years, following the destruction of the Temple of Jerusalem. The first physical evidence that historians know of comes from the 11th century, and was found in Cairo Geniza. The descendants of this community still live in Houmt Souk.

This community is unique in the Jewish diaspora for its unusually high percentage of kohanim, direct patrilineal descendants of Aaron, the first high priest from Mosaic times, a claim which has been valildated by genetic tests for Cohen modal haplotype. Local tradition holds that when Nebuchadnezzar II levelled Solomon's temple and laid waste to Judah and the city of Jerusalem in the year 586 BC, the Kohenim who settled in Djerba were among the refugees who were able to avoid slavery. The legend claims the Kohenim carried the door and some stones from the Temple in Jerusalem which they then incorporated into the "marvelous synagogue", also known as Ghriba, which still stands in Djerba. Some traditions that are distinctive of the Jewish Djerba community is the kiddush prayer said on the eve of Passover and a few prophetic passages on certain Shabbats of the year. One of the community's synagogues, the El Ghriba synagogue, has been in continuous use for over 2,000 years.

The next influx of Jewish people to the Island of Djerba occurred during the Spanish Inquisition, when the Iberian Jewish population was expelled. The Jewish population hit its peak during the time that Tunisia was fighting for independence from France (1881–1956). In 1940, there were approximately 100,000 Jewish-Tunisians or 15% of the entire population of Tunisia.

In the aftermath of World War II, the Jewish population on the island declined significantly due to emigration to Israel and France. As of 2011, the Jewish permanent resident community on the island numbered about 1,000, but many return annually on pilgrimage. However, once the State of Israel was established, and political unrest in the Middle East and North Africa was building up many Jewish people were expelled from Tunisia. Although the Jewish community of Tunisia was on the decline, the community on Djerba remains one of the last remaining fully intact Jewish communities in a Muslim majority country. The mostly traditionally observant community is growing because of large natural families despite emigration.

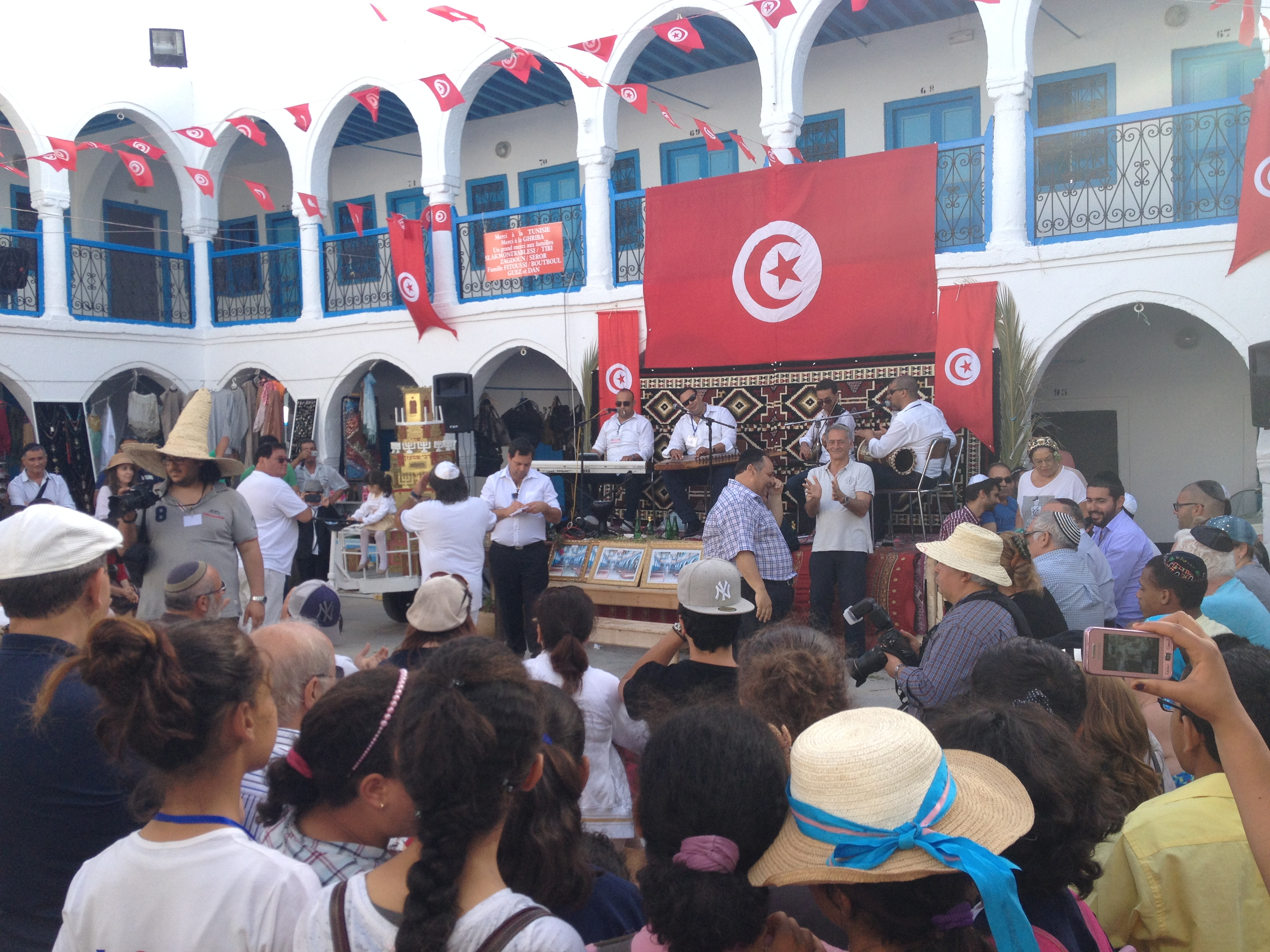
Lag BaOmer festival in Djerba

The historical conflicts between Muslims and Jewish people have been largely absent in Djerba. This is reportedly attributed due to all the people of the island being at some point Jewish, and therefore share similar practices in their ways of life. Some of these Jewish practices that can be seen in Muslim households in Djerba are the lighting of candles on Friday night, and the suspending of matzot on the ceiling from one spring to the next. The Jewish and Muslim communities have continued to coexist peacefully in Djerba despite political unrest regarding the Israeli–Palestinian conflict. The people of Djerba say that the two communities simply pray in different places, but are still able to converse. A Jewish leader once stated "We live together, We visit our friends on their religious holidays. We work together. Muslims buy meat from our butchers. When we are forbidden to work or cook on the Shabbat, we buy bread and kosher food cooking by Muslims. Our children play together".

On 11 April 2002, Al-Qaeda claimed responsibility for a truck bomb attack close to the famous synagogue, killing 21 people (14 German tourists, 5 Tunisians and 2 French nationals).

Since the Arab Spring, the Tunisian government has extended its protection and encouraged Jewish life on the island of Djerba. Citing the long and unique Jewish history on Djerba, Tunisia has sought UNESCO World Heritage status for the island. There are currently 14 synagogues, 2 yeshivot and 3 kosher restaurants.

A Jewish school on the island was firebombed during the national protests held in 2018, while security forces in Djerba were reduced, being preoccupied with protection efforts elsewhere. This attack was among many other uprisings that were occurring throughout Tunisia at the time.

On 9 May 2023, El Ghriba Synagogue was the target of a mass shooting on a large gathering of Jewish pilgrims that takes place every year at the synagogue. Five people were killed including: two Jewish cousins, a Jewish-French tourist, and two Tunisian security guards.

=== Ecclesiastical history ===
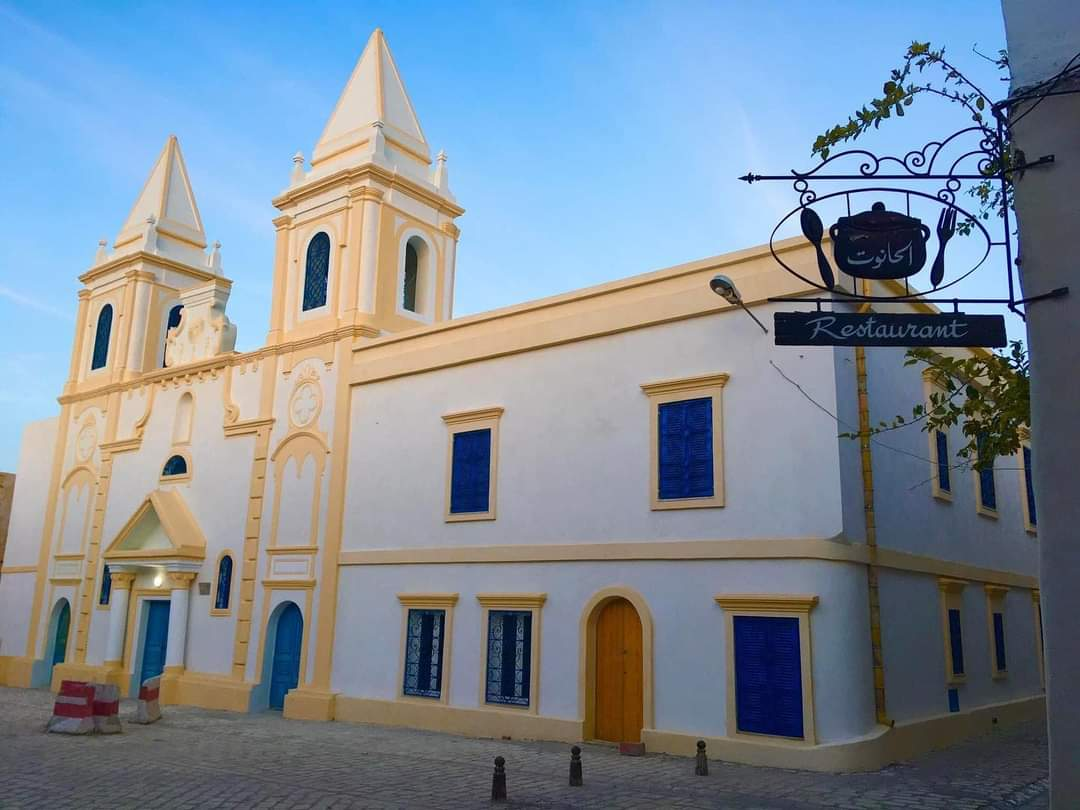
Saint Joseph Catholic Church in Houmt El Souk

The city Girba in the Roman province of Tripolitania (mostly in modern Libya), which gave its name to the island, was important enough to become a suffragan bishop of its capital's archbishopric. Known Bishops of antiquity include:

- Proculus (Maximus Bishop fl.393)
- Quodvultdeus (Catholic Bishop fl.401–411) attending Council of Carthage (411)
- Euasius (Donatist Bishop fl.411) rival at Council of Carthage
- Urbanus (Catholic bishop fl.445–454)
- Faustinus (Catholic bishop fl. 484), exiled by King Huneric of the Vandal Kingdom
- Vincentius (Catholic bishop fl. 523–525)

The 1909 Catholic Encyclopedia lists only two: "At least two bishops of Girba are known, Monnulus and Vincent, who assisted at the Councils, of Carthage in 255 and 525".

== Climate ==
Djerba has a hot desert climate (Köppen climate classification: BWh) that borders on a hot semi-arid climate (BSh).

Climate data for Djerba (1981–2010, extremes 1898–present)
Month	Jan	Feb	Mar	Apr	May	Jun	Jul	Aug	Sep	Oct	Nov	Dec	Year
Record high °C (°F)	31.8 (89.2)	35.2 (95.4)	35.0 (95.0)	38.6 (101.5)	43.7 (110.7)	46.0 (114.8)	46.1 (115.0)	46.3 (115.3)	42.8 (109.0)	42.3 (108.1)	34.4 (93.9)	28.6 (83.5)	46.3 (115.3)
Mean daily maximum °C (°F)	16.5 (61.7)	17.8 (64.0)	20.3 (68.5)	23.1 (73.6)	26.6 (79.9)	30.0 (86.0)	32.9 (91.2)	33.5 (92.3)	30.9 (87.6)	27.6 (81.7)	22.4 (72.3)	17.8 (64.0)	25.0 (76.9)
Daily mean °C (°F)	12.9 (55.2)	13.7 (56.7)	15.8 (60.4)	18.3 (64.9)	21.8 (71.2)	25.2 (77.4)	27.8 (82.0)	28.7 (83.7)	26.7 (80.1)	23.4 (74.1)	18.6 (65.5)	14.5 (58.1)	20.6 (69.1)
Mean daily minimum °C (°F)	9.2 (48.6)	9.6 (49.3)	11.6 (52.9)	14.2 (57.6)	17.5 (63.5)	20.8 (69.4)	23.1 (73.6)	24.3 (75.7)	22.8 (73.0)	19.5 (67.1)	14.7 (58.5)	11.0 (51.8)	16.5 (61.7)
Record low °C (°F)	0.0 (32.0)	1.0 (33.8)	4.0 (39.2)	5.0 (41.0)	6.0 (42.8)	12.0 (53.6)	15.0 (59.0)	14.0 (57.2)	14.0 (57.2)	10.0 (50.0)	3.0 (37.4)	1.0 (33.8)	0.0 (32.0)
Average precipitation mm (inches)	27.4 (1.08)	14.3 (0.56)	15.9 (0.63)	11.8 (0.46)	5.1 (0.20)	1.4 (0.06)	0.3 (0.01)	1.3 (0.05)	20.3 (0.80)	36.2 (1.43)	27.2 (1.07)	41.3 (1.63)	202.5 (7.98)
Average precipitation days (≥ 1.0 mm)	3.4	3.1	2.7	1.8	1.1	0.5	0.0	0.1	2.1	3.5	2.8	3.5	24.6
Average relative humidity (%)	69	67	66	66	65	66	63	65	69	68	67	70	67
Mean monthly sunshine hours	208.5	214.9	247.1	275.5	311.3	336.0	369.5	348.3	262.8	242.2	212.8	206.0	3,234.9
Mean daily sunshine hours	6.7	7.4	7.9	8.8	10.1	10.7	12.1	11.3	9.2	8.0	7.1	6.6	8.8
Source 1: Institut National de la Météorologie (precipitation days/humidity 1961–1990) (Note: The Station ID for Djerba is 57070211.)
Source 2: NOAA (humidity and daily sun 1961–1990), Meteo Climat (record highs and lows)

Climate data for Djerba
Month	Jan	Feb	Mar	Apr	May	Jun	Jul	Aug	Sep	Oct	Nov	Dec	Year
Average sea temperature °C (°F)	16.0 (61.0)	15.0 (59.0)	16.0 (61.0)	17.0 (63.0)	19.0 (66.0)	22.0 (72.0)	26.0 (79.0)	28.0 (82.0)	27.0 (81.0)	25.0 (77.0)	22.0 (72.0)	18.0 (64.0)	20.9 (69.8)
Mean daily daylight hours	10.0	11.0	12.0	13.0	14.0	14.0	14.0	13.0	12.0	11.0	10.0	10.0	12.0
Average Ultraviolet index	3	4	6	8	9	10	11	10	8	6	4	3	6.8
Source #1: Weather2Travel (sea temperature)
Source #2: Weather Atlas

== Migratory bird sanctuary ==
Djerba Bin El Ouedian is a wetland and habitat for migratory birds. It is located at 33 ° 40 'N, 10 ° 55 'E. On 7 November 2007 the wetland was included on the list of Ramsar sites under the Ramsar Convention, due to its importance as a bird refuge.

== Notable people ==
- Arosyat Al-Naloti, scholar and screenwriter
- Aemilian, Roman emperor (253 AD)

== See also ==
- European enclaves in North Africa before 1830
- Borj El Kebir
- Menachem Mazuz, former Attorney General of Israel & supreme judge
- Yael Shelbia, Israeli model, descendant of Djerba inhabitants
- Djerba–Zarzis International Airport
- Menzel (Djerba)
