= Ben Guerdane =

Ben Guerdane بنڤردان Ben Gardane
- City
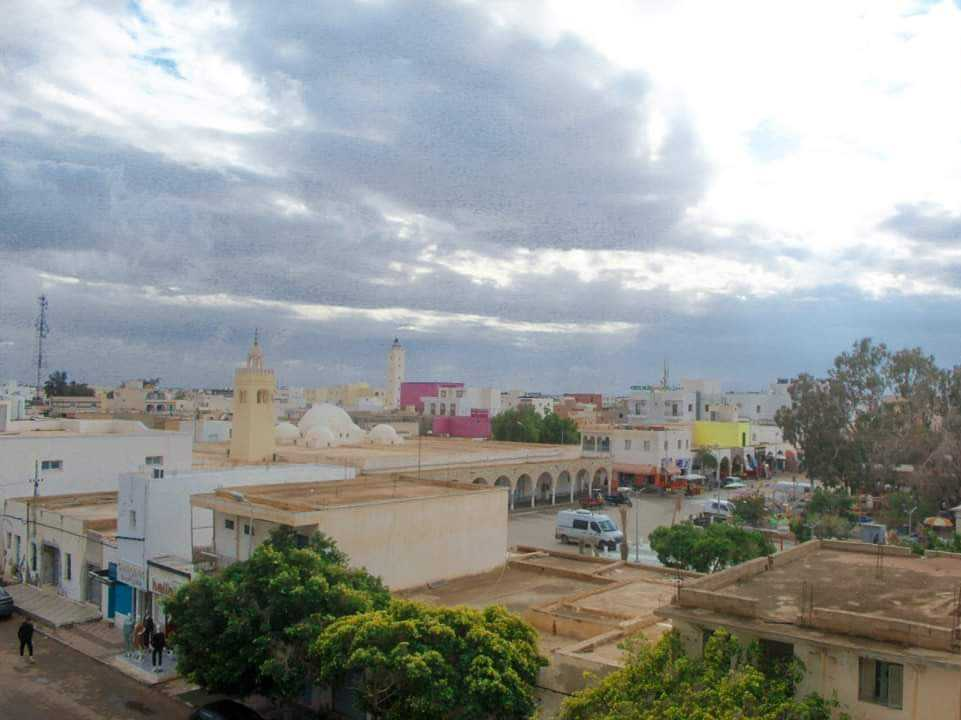
- Nickname: Eastern Tunisia Gate
- Location in Tunisia
- Coordinates: 33°8′20″N 11°13′0″E
- Country: Tunisia
- Governorate: Medenine Governorate

Government
  - Delegate: Sami Khalifa
  - Mayor: Oussama Msakni (Municipal general secretary)

Area
  - Total: 1,827 sq mi (4,732 km^{2})
- Elevation: 75 ft (23 m)

Population (2024)
  - Total: 90,504
- Time zone: UTC+1 (CET)
- Postal code: 4160
- Website: www.commune-bengardene.gov.tn

Ben Guerdane, Ben Gardane or Bengardane (Tunisian Arabic: بنڤردان or بن ڤردان, Bin Girdān) is a coastal town in south eastern Tunisia, close to the border with Libya.

== History ==
During the Second World War Ben Gardane Airfield was used by the 57th Fighter Group, which flew P-40 Warhawks from the airfield from 9 to 21 March 1943 during the Eighth Army advance into Tunisia from Libya, to which the 57th was attached. It was also used by Spitfires from the 601 Squadron RAF.

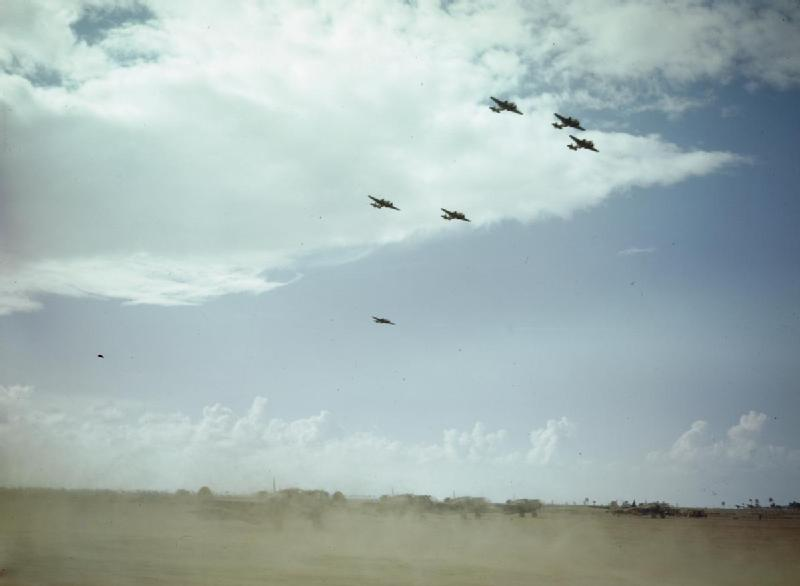
Royal Air Force, Second World War

Ben Guerdane is part of the governorate of Medenine, it lies about 559km (347mi) by road from Tunis, making it the Tunisian city located farthest from the capital.

It is the last major city in the governorate of Medenine with total population estimated at 66,567 inhabitants in 2014. It is located 32 kilometers from the Tunisian-Libyan border.

It is best known both in Tunisia and Libya as a trade road and an open exchange market. Tunisians take advantage of the availability and variety of the goods existing in the shops. The great amount of these goods are basically imported from Libya and deemed less expensive.

It is distinguished for its large population of dromedaries estimated at 15,000 head. An annual festival devoted to them during the month of June.

In March 2016, the Islamic State of Iraq and the Levant in Libya attacked the town in the Battle of Ben Guerdane.

=== Islamic militancy ===
According to The Washington Post, "hundreds of young men have left Ben Guerdane over the past three decades to wage jihad in Iraq, Afghanistan and Bosnia, radicalized in part by a repressive regime that persecuted Islamists".

The leader of Al-Qaeda in Iraq, Abu Musab al-Zarqawi famously said of Ben Gardane, "if it was located next to Fallujah, we would have liberated Iraq."

=== Population and tribal diversity ===
There is a mixture of Berbers and Arabs, who from the Twazin tribal alliance which took place centuries ago as a tribal defense shield against the invasion, especially from the east towards Libya. There is no historical record as to the date of the establishment of this alliance but the inhabitants of Bengardane still have this bond and are said to be proud of the alliance. Beside the Twazin, there are other large tribes such as Jelidat, Rabai'a which have participated in shaping the heritage, culture and way of life in Ben Gardane.

== Economy ==
The economy of Ben Guerdane is largely shaped by its proximity to the Libyan border and the Ras Jedir crossing. For decades, a significant share of local economic activity has depended on informal cross-border trade, including fuel and consumer goods imported from Libya. This informal economy has provided income for many residents in the absence of large-scale industrial activity or sustained public and private investment in the region.

Periodic closures or restrictions at the Ras Jedir border crossing have had a direct impact on the town’s economy, leading to reduced commercial activity, shop closures, and higher unemployment. Several reports have noted that the lack of viable economic alternatives has increased Ben Guerdane’s dependence on cross-border trade networks.

In response, Tunisian authorities have announced development initiatives aimed at integrating Ben Guerdane more fully into the formal economy, including plans to promote legal trade, logistics services, and investment in border regions, though progress has remained limited according to observers.

== People ==
- Ahmed Eyadh Ouederni, politician
- Riadh Bettaieb (born 1961), politician
- Afef Jnifen (born 1963), model and television presenter

== See also ==
- Ben Gardane Delegation
- 2016 Ben Guerdane attack

== Gallery ==

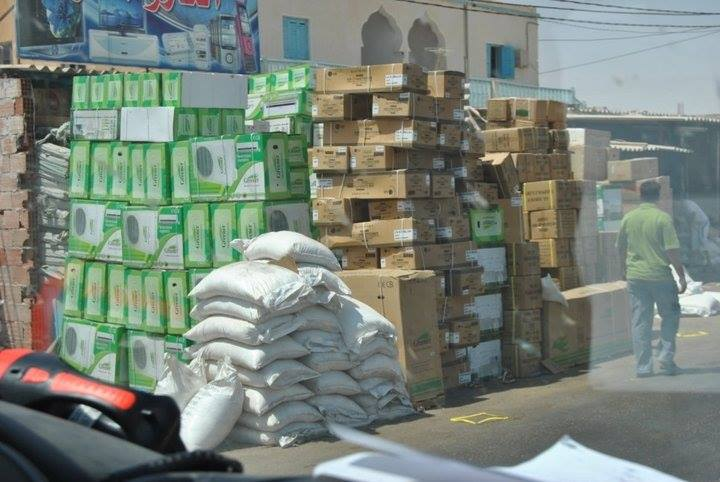

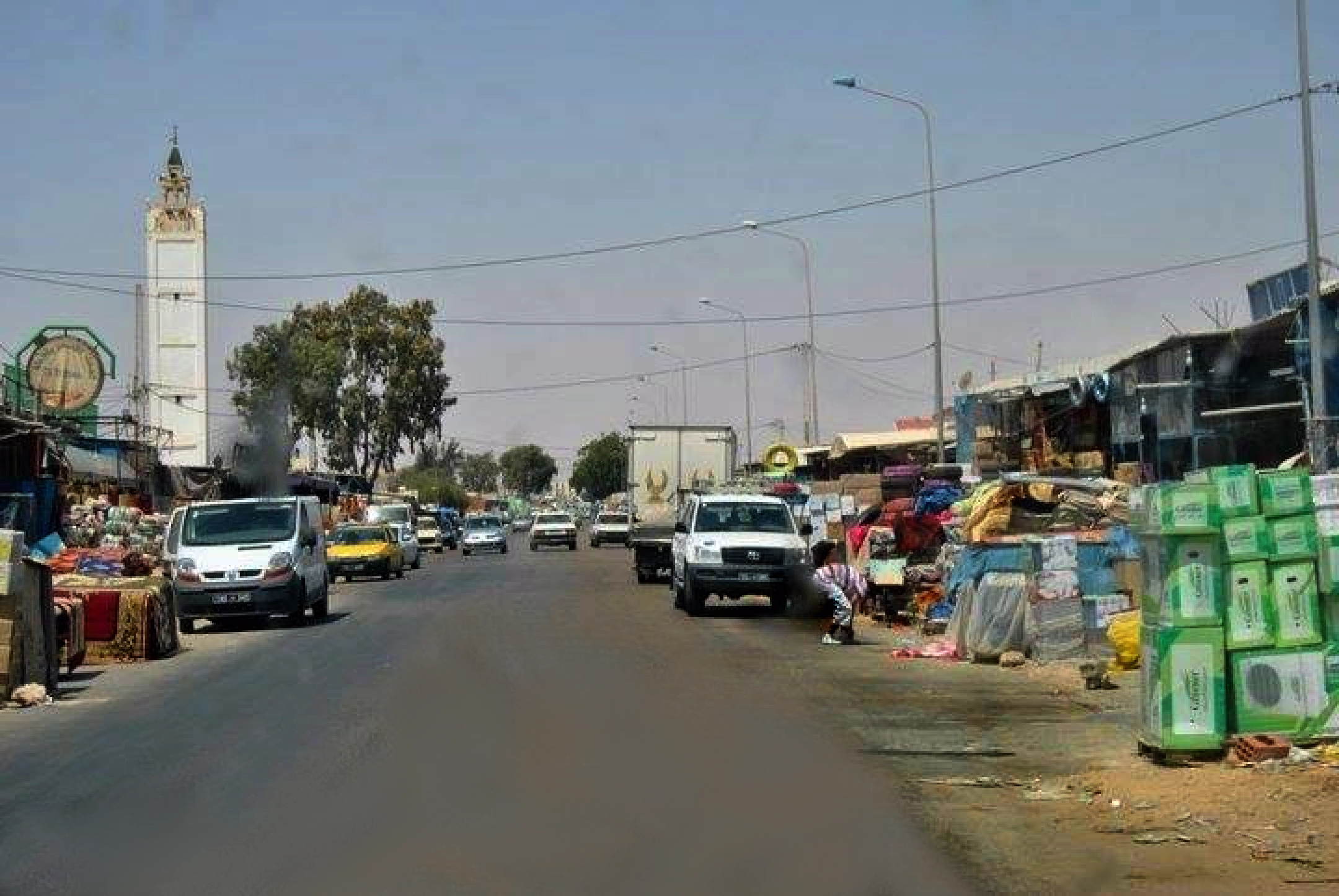
