= Medenine Governorate =

Governorate of Tunisia

Medenine مدنين
- Governorate
- Map of Tunisia with Medenine highlighted

- Subdivisions of Medenine Governorate
- Coordinates: 33°21′17″N 10°30′19″E
- Country: Tunisia
- Created: 21 June 1956
- Capital: Medenine

Government
  - Governor: Walid Tabboubi (since 2024)

Area
  - Total: 9,167 km^{2} (3,539 sq mi)
  - Rank: Ranked 3rd of 24

Population (2024)
  - Total: 537,255
  - Rank: Ranked 10th of 24
  - Density: 58.61/km^{2} (151.8/sq mi)
- Time zone: UTC+01 (CET)
- Postal prefix: xx
- ISO 3166 code: TN-82

Medenine (Arabic: مدنين Mednīn; French: Médenine) is one of the 24 governorates (provinces) of Tunisia, it had a population of 537,255 (2024 census) situated in the south-east, it includes the island of Djerba and borders Libya to the east. The capital is Mednine.

== Geography ==
The governorate encompasses the south-easternmost coastal strip, totalling 9167 km^{2} and had a population of 479,520 at the 2014 census. The capital is Medenine. The governorate includes the country's largest island, Djerba, which is connected by a ferry boat and has over a third of the total population of the governate and its own airport.

The area is generally lowlands. It extends in two projections at its extreme ends a maximum of 60 km from the coast, otherwise the neighbouring division of Tataouine is 30 km from the coast. The northern projection abuts Kebili Governorate and includes part of a long escarpment which extends from the south of Gabes Governorate (adjoining Medenine to the north) to beyond Tripoli in Libya and which is dotted with settlements. Precipitation is low and reaches a maximum between October and January, the far north of the governorate and western hill range benefiting from this most. Key settlements are those associated with ports, tourism, fishing, farming in more fertile parts within the north-east and oases.

== Administrative divisions ==
The governorate is divided into nine delegations (mutamadiyat), listed below with their populations at the 2004 and 2014 Censuses:

Delegation	Area in km^{2}	Pop'n 2004 Census	Pop'n 2014 Census
Ben Gardane	4,807	70,907	79,912
Beni Khedech	1,360	28,586	25,885
Médenine Nord	334	48,102	54,769
Médenine Sud	734	48,087	54,640
Djerba Houmet Souk	163	64,919	75,904
Djerba Midoun	189	50,459	63,528
Djerba Ajim	159	24,166	24,294
Sidi Makhloulf	659	23,728	25,206
Zarzis	886	73,549	75,382

Seven municipalities are in Medenine Governorate:

5211	Medenine	120,712
5212	Beni Khedache	2,930
5213	Ben Gardane	90,504
5214	Zarzis	75,382
5215	Houmt El Souk (Djerba)	80,000+
5216	Midoun (Djerba)	74,437
5217	Ajim (Djerba)	24,294
	Sidi Makhlouf	28,444
