= Battle of Djerba =

1560 naval battle

Coordinates: 33.7833°N 10.8833°E

- Part of Spanish–Ottoman wars
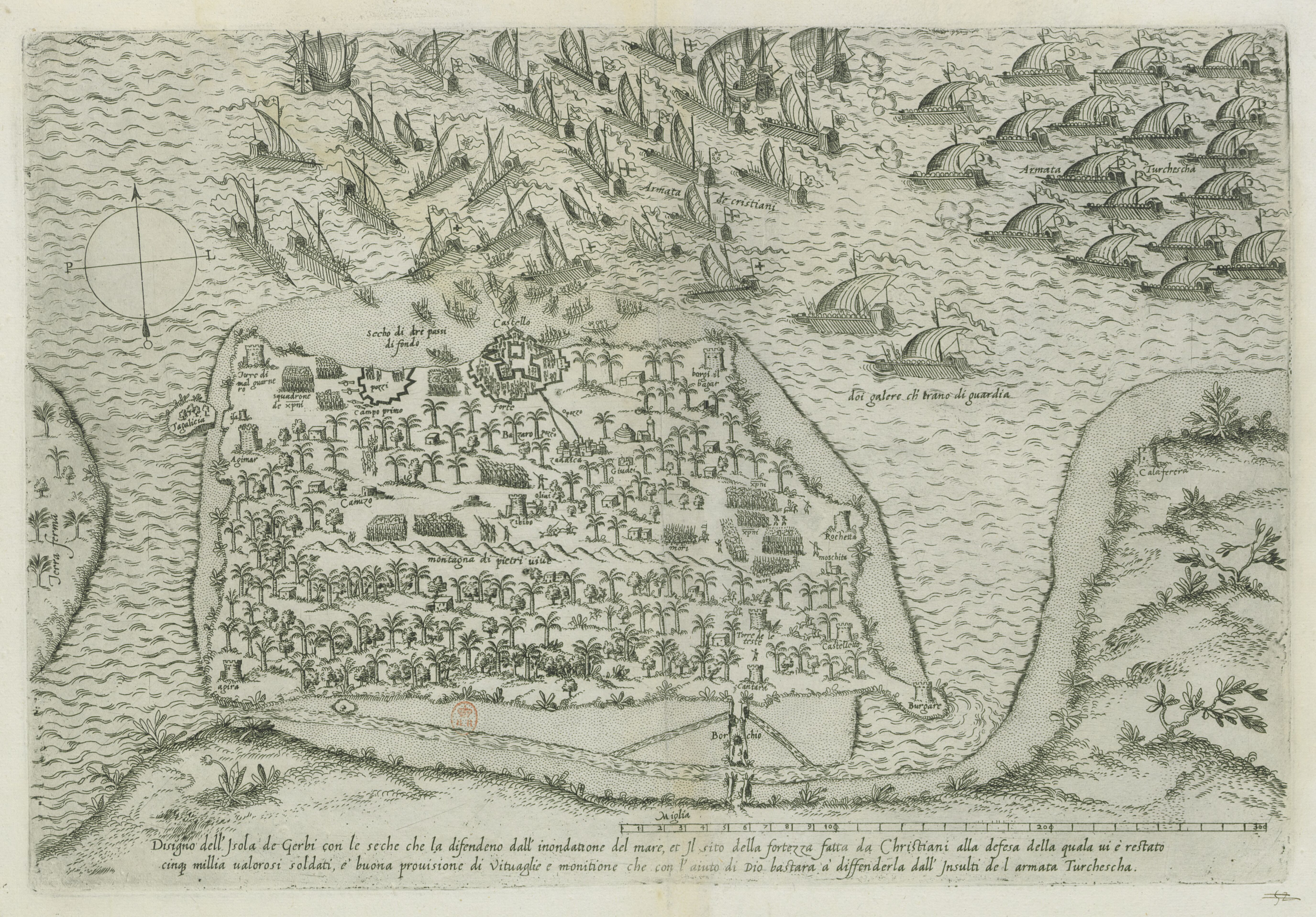
- Battle of Djerba 1560
Date	9–14 May 1560
Location	Near the island of Djerba off the coast of Tunisia
Result	Ottoman victory (Note: The sixteenth century saw only three such large battles: Preveza in 1538, Djerba in 1560 and Lepanto in 1571. These battles were spectacular..[...].Nevertheless, these battles were not really decisive; a galley fleet can be built in a few months and the logistical limitations of galleys prohibit the strategic exploitation of victory.)

Belligerents
Republic of Genoa; Spanish Empire: Viceroyalty of Naples and Sicily; Papal States; Duchy of Savoy; Order of Saint John	Ottoman Empire

Commanders and leaders
Giovanni Andrea Doria; Juan de la Cerda; Don Alvaro de Sande (POW)	Piali Pasha; Dragut

Strength
54 galleys, 66 other vessels Other sources: 200 ships total	86 galleys and galliots

Casualties and losses
60 ships sunk or captured, 9,000–18,000 men lost, 5,000 prisoners (during siege)	Unknown

The Battle of Djerba (Turkish: Cerbe Deniz Muharebesi, Arabic: معركة جربة) took place in May 1560 near the island of Djerba, Tunisia. The Ottomans under Piali Pasha's command overwhelmed a large joint Christian alliance fleet, composed chiefly of Spanish, Papal, Genoese, Maltese, and Neapolitan forces. The allies lost 27 galleys and some smaller vessels as well as the fortified island of Djerba. This victory marked perhaps the high point of Ottoman power in the Mediterranean Sea.

Until about 1573 the Mediterranean headed the list of Spanish priorities under Philip II of Spain (1556–98); under his leadership the Habsburg galley fleet increased to about 100 ships, and more in wartime. Spain sent a major fleet against the Turks in 1560, aiming for the island of Djerba off the coast west of Tripoli. The fleet took the coast and, after much division between their commanders, built a fortress, hoping to use it to later reconquer Tripoli for the Knights Hospitaller, who had ruled it from 1530 and 1551 before their fall to the Ottomans.

The arrival of an Ottoman fleet of similar size interrupted the plans. The Christians opted to leave rather than facing the Ottomans, but with the sudden flight of their ill admiral, Giovanni Andrea Doria, the Christian fleet disbanded in their way out and became easy prey. The Ottomans quickly routed and captured much of the fleet, and then besieged the fortress, which Doria intended to relief from Sicily before being overruled by Philip. The fortress was taken after several weeks, with the Ottomans killing more than 5,000 men and carrying a similar number of prisoners.

However, typical of the aftermath of Mediterranean battles, the Ottomans did not quickly follow up on their victory. Spain was able to rebuild its fleet in the next two years and prepared a new offensive in 1563–64 with nearly 100 ships. Despite the Ottomans being victorious in the battle, the supply limitations of their galley fleet made them unable to quickly deploy it elsewhere, either by attacking the defeated powers or the now-exposed Venetian center of gravity. It would be five years before the Ottomans followed up on their victory with a major attack on the Knights of Malta, and a decade before they attacked the Venetian Republic again in force.

== Background ==
Since losing against the Ottoman fleet of Hayreddin Barbarossa at the Battle of Preveza in 1538 and the disastrous expedition of Charles V, Holy Roman Emperor against Barbarossa in Algiers in 1541, the major European sea powers in the Mediterranean Sea, the Spanish Empire and the Republic of Venice, felt more and more threatened by the Ottomans and their allies, the Barbary corsairs. Indeed, by 1558, Piali Pasha had raided the Balearic Islands, and, together with Dragut, raided the Mediterranean coasts of Spain.

King Philip II of Spain appealed to Pope Paul IV and his allies in Europe to organize an expedition to retake Tripoli from Dragut, who had captured the city from the Knights Hospitaller in August 1551 and had subsequently been made Bey (Governor) of Tripoli by Suleiman the Magnificent.

== Opposing forces ==
The historian William H. Prescott wrote that the sources describing the Djerba campaign were so contradictory it was impossible to reconcile them. Most historians believe that the fleet assembled by the allied Christian powers in 1560 consisted of between 50 and 60 galleys and between 40 and 60 smaller craft. For example, Giacomo Bosio, the official historian of the Knights of St John writes that there were 54 galleys. Fernand Braudel also gives 54 warships plus 36 supply vessels. One of the most detailed accounts is by Carmel Testa who evidently has access to the archives of the Knights of St. John. He lists precisely 54 galleys, 7 brigs, 17 frigates, 2 galleons, 28 merchant vessels, and 12 small ships. These were supplied by a coalition that consisted of Genoa, the Grand Duchy of Tuscany, the Papal States, and the Knights of S. John. Matthew Carr gives the number of 200 ships for the Christian Alliance. The joint fleet was assembled at Messina under the command of the nineteen-year-old Giovanni Andrea Doria, nephew of the Genoese admiral Andrea Doria. It first sailed to Malta, where bad weather forced it to remain for two months. During this time some 2,000 men were lost to sickness.

On 10 February 1560, the fleet set sail for Tripoli. The precise numbers of soldiers aboard are not known. Braudel gives 10,000-12,000; Testa 14,000; older figures in excess of 20,000 are clearly exaggerations considering the number of men a sixteenth-century galley could carry.

=== Previous movements ===
Although the expedition landed not far from Tripoli, the lack of water, sickness and a freak storm caused the commanders to abandon their original objective, and on 7 March they returned to the island of Djerba, which they quickly overran. The Viceroy of Sicily, Juan de la Cerda, 4th Duke of Medinaceli, ordered a fort to be built on the island based on old, preexistent Catalonian fortifications, and construction was begun. Due to a mix of low quality supplies and swampy terrain, the Christian camp fell prey of an epidemic, to the point up to 2,000 died around this time. Doria was amongst those who fell seriously ill.

The decision to seize Djerba, insistently championed by Medinaceli, was based on the idea that it could serve as a springboard for operations against Tripoli and local Barbary corsairs. However, Doria and the Knights of Malta opposed the move, deeming the location of little strategic value, as it lacked a harbor, fresh water, or defensible terrain. The Order of St. John also feared an attempt to renege on the pledge to retake Tripoli, and to further complicate matters, disease was rampant. In any event, on May 6, the Christians completed the construction of the fortress, utilizing ancient local fortifications originally built by Roger of Lauria. Unbeknownst to the Christians, their activities had been discovered by informants working for the Ottoman commander Occhiali, a lieutenant of Dragut.

The Christians thought the Turks might arrive in January 1561, but a fleet of about 86 galleys and galliots under the command of admiral Piali Pasha had sailed off from Constantinople towards Djerba. On May 8, the camp was informed that Piali had arrived to Gozzo and would soon reach Tripoli, causing alarm in the Christian fleet. Ironically, the Imperial ambassador to Constantinople, Ogier Ghislain de Busbecq, would later report that the Turks themselves did not believe victory was possible and thought they would crash against the Spanish defensive positions, to the point that many prepared their wills.

== Battle ==
The Christian admirals disagreed about their course of action, which wasted a long time to prepare. Giovanni Andrea Doria, attending the council from his bed, pushed for leaving the land forces in the fortress and set sail before the Ottomans arrived, not wanting to risk the fleet under unfavorable conditions. According to Duro, Sancho de Leyva and Scipione Doria believed the Christian fleet had the necessary advantage in numbers and artillery to fight off Piali's fleet, especially if it remained packed together and counting on their heavily armed carracks and galleons. Medinacelli also pushed for staying, not believing the Turkish fleet was headed for Djerba and opining it would not be easy to defend against in that case. Anderson recorded no voice calling to fight, but regarded that indeed the Christian fleet was at least on equal footing with the Ottoman.

At the end, however, Giovanni Andrea's opinion prevailed and the fleet prepared to set off. At that moment, Piali's fleet was in the horizon. The Ottoman fleet had reached the vicinity that night, remaining at anchor twelve miles from Djerba, and by dawn, they were waiting close by. As the sun rose, the Turks themselves were struck by the size and bearing of the Christian fleet, which the chronicler and eyewitness Zekeriyazade Yahya described as a "forest of masts".

=== Naval battle ===
The Christian fleet took long to sail off due to sudden unfavorable winds. Spotting the Turks, Scipione sent a messenger to Giovanni's flagship asking for orders, but received none. The flagship then ran aground, at which point Giovanni shockingly ordered to abandon ship and fled to land in a skiff. In the light of his example, the fleet was thrown into confusion and practically disbanded. As put by Anderson, Giovanni "seems to have lost his head completely", presumably as a consequence of his illness according to chronicles. Vessels fled in all directions; some of them took refuge under the fortress, others were abandoned, others ran aground, and others broke their rigging attempting to sail away without the right wind.

Island and fortress of Djerba.

Ascertaining the situation, and relieved to see that the dreaded Spanish artillery was not in a position to engage, Piali judged that speed was his best asset for defeating the Christians before they could regain any semblance of order. He ordered an attack at full speed, even having his galleys cut their anchor cables to avoid wasting time weighing anchor, and bore down on the Christian fleet in a crescent formation, finding little to no effective resistance. When some of the Spanish vessels managed to break free and flee, the Turkish commander split his fleet in two and ordered a pursuit. Scipione and other galleys managed to fight their way out and escape by sea, but Leiva, laden with spoils, was surrounded and captured. The battle was over in a matter of hours, with about half the Christian galleys captured or sunk.

The only ships to escape unscathed were carracks and galleons, which the Ottomans avoided due to their guns, although almost half of them had been abandoned and were captured empty. Anderson gives the total number of Christian casualties as 18,000, but Guilmartin more conservatively puts the losses at about 9,000 of which about two-thirds would have been oarsmen.

The captain in charge of the fortress, Álvaro de Sande, sallied out and covered the escape of many of the survivors with arquebus fire from the beaches. Discussing what to do in such a situation, Medinacelli, not being a seaman, abstained from the decision and delegated the task of extricating them to Doria. Doria proposed the only viable option: to set sail, rally the remnants of the fleet, and seek reinforcements in Sicily and Malta. Consequently, Medinacelli arranged to board one of five galleys bound directly for Malta. For his part, Sande elected to stay in the fortress in order to try to protect the survivors and detain the Ottoman fleet as long as possible, admitting it was essentially a suicide mission. Doria then sailed off with De la Cerda.

On the Turkish side, Dragut soon met Piali overland, and they weighed their options with uncertainty. The Spanish fort was well defended by its artillery and the shallowness of the coastal waters, which blocked the Turkish fleet's approach, and there were fears that a relief fleet might be preparing in Malta. Furthermore, Piali distrusted the loyalty of the local Muslims. Sande also counted on these factors to hold out as long as possible, knowing that a large part of the Spanish fleet remained intact and that Malta was not far away.

=== Siege of the fortress ===
However, although Doria and La Cerda reached Sicily, no rescue mission was ordered. Philip II considered instructing García de Toledo to prepare another fleet, but upon hearing the news brought by the commanders, he decided against it. This decision may have been influenced by the belief that Sande could hold out on his own until the inclement weather of September forced the Ottomans to abandon the siege. More than 5,000 people remained in the fort, including 3,000 soldiers led by Sande, most under the command of Miguel Barahona, maestre de campo of the Lombardy infantry, along with sailors, support staff, women, and civilians.

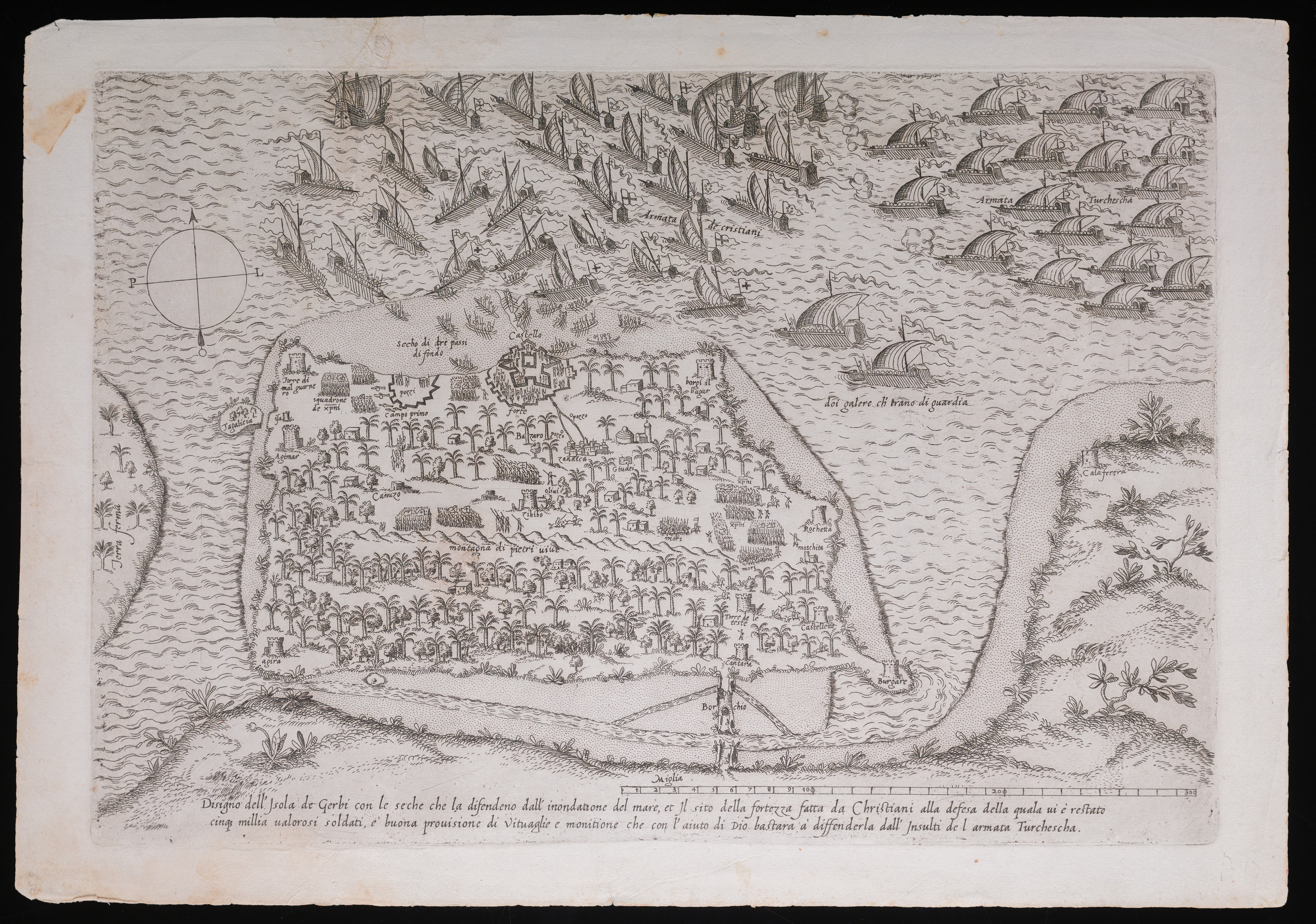
Map of the siege of the fort in 1560.

Meanwhile, Piali offered Sande terms of surrender. When the Spaniard refused, the Turk decided to proceed with the siege anyway, ordering Dragut to bring troops and artillery from Tripoli. He had the fortress surrounded and ordered a continuous bombardment of its positions, causing damage that Sande and the defenders repaired as best they could. In response, Sande ordered small sorties; on one occasion, his men even approached the Ottoman camp and nearly captured Dragut, though these attempts ultimately failed to achieve their objective.

In June, Piali reported to Constantinople that they would have to abandon the effort, as the fortress was still standing and the defenders appeared to be well-supplied. However, in a turn of events, the Turks managed to cut off the fortress's water supply on July 21. Sande responded by commissioning the construction of eighteen wood-fired alembics to desalinate seawater, designed by the Sicilian engineer Sebastiano Poller (possibly based on an earlier design patented by Blasco de Garay). The soldiers also began to supplement their food rations by eating the corpses of Ottoman soldiers. On the 27th, the supply of firewood for the alembics ran out; consequently, with the garrison reduced to 800 fighting men, Sande ordered a final sortie.

The accounts of the final days of the besieged garrison are irreconcilable. Ogier Ghiselin de Busbecq, the House of Habsburg ambassador from Austria to Constantinople, recounts in his famous Turkish Letters that, recognizing the futility of armed resistance, de Sande had tried to escape in a small boat, but was quickly captured. In other accounts, such as that of Braudel, he led a sortie on 29 July and was captured in that way. Be that as it may, after a three-month siege, the remnants of the Christian garrison surrendered on July 31, with all non-combatants put to the sword.

After a three-month siege, the garrison surrendered and, according to Bosio, Piali carried about 5,000 prisoners back to Istanbul, including the Spanish commander, D. Alvaro de Sande, who had taken command of the Christian forces after Doria had fled. Shortly thereafter, Piali passed by Malta, where Grand Master Jean Parisot de Valette unsuccessfully attempted to pay the ransom for some prisoners. The Ottomans refused to allow this even for the French captives, despite the long-standing Franco-Ottoman alliance. A plague broke out in Constantinople shortly thereafter, attributed to the sick prisoners they had brought with them. Through Busbecq's efforts, de Sande was ransomed and released several years later and fought against the Turks at the Great Siege of Malta in 1565.

== Aftermath ==
The victory in the Battle of Djerba marked the apex of Ottoman naval domination in the Mediterranean, which had been growing since the Battle of Preveza 22 years earlier.

Of particular importance were the crippling losses of the Spanish fleet in experienced personnel: 600 skilled mariners (oficiales) and 2,400 arquebusier marines were lost, men who could not be quickly replaced.

The Ottomans had expelled the Knights from Rhodes in 1522. After Djerba, the Maltese channel lay open, and it was inevitable that the Ottomans soon turned on the new base of the Knights in the Great Siege of Malta in 1565, but did not succeed in taking it. A freed Sande participated in the relief.

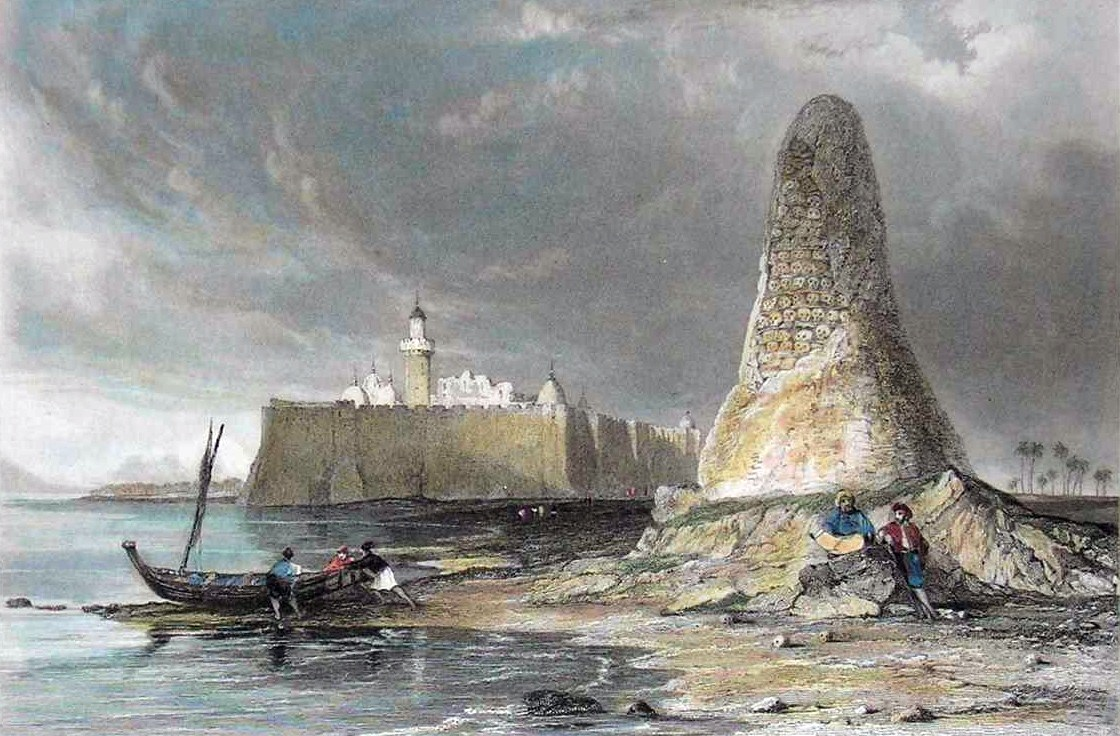
The Citadel of Skulls (Borj el Jamajem, (برج يلجماجم) at Borj El Kebir in Houmt El Souk

The victorious Ottomans erected the Borj el-Jemajem (Tunisian Arabic: برج يلجماجم, romanized: Citadel of Skulls), or pyramid of skulls, of the defeated Spanish defenders, which stood until the late nineteenth century. A small monument now stands in its place at Borj El Kebir in Houmt El Souk.

== In literature ==
The Battle of Djerba is given a prominent place in The Course of Fortune by Tony Rothman (2015), a novel that concerns the events leading to the Great Siege of Malta, 1565.

The Battle of Djerba is featured in Falcon's Shadow: A Novel of the Knights of Malta by Marthese Fenech (2020) the second novel in Fenech's Siege of Malta trilogy.

== Sources ==
- Allen, Bruce Ware (2017). The Great Siege of Malta: The Epic Battle Between the Ottoman Empire and the Knights of St. John. University Press of New England. ISBN 9781512601169.
- Anderson, Roger Charles (1952). Naval wars in the Levant, 1559-1853. Princeton University Press.
- Hattendorf, John; King, Ernest (5 November 2013). Naval Strategy and Power in the Mediterranean: Past, Present and Future. Routledge. ISBN 978-1-136-71317-0.
- Fernández Duro, Cesáreo (1896). Armada Española, desde la unión de los reinos de Castilla y Aragón, tomo II. Madrid: Instituto de Historia Naval.
