= El Ghazi =

El Ghazi may refer to:

- Borj El Kebir, an ancient castle in Djerba, Tunisia

== People with the surname ==
- Anwar El Ghazi (born 1995), Dutch professional footballer
- Ben Assou El Ghazi (born 1938), Moroccan long-distance runner
- Hayat El Ghazi (born 1979), Moroccan hammer thrower
- Hassan el Ghazi (1713–1790), Ottoman Grand Admiral
