= Brasilinvest =

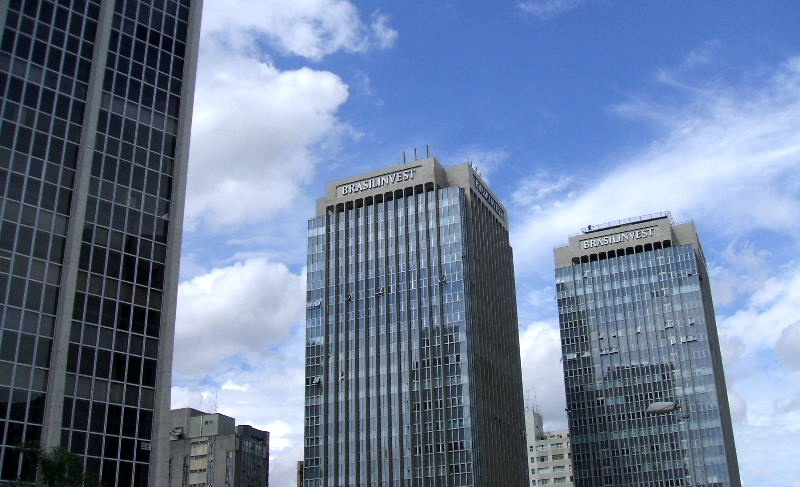
- Brasilinvest headquarters on Rebouças Avenue, in São Paulo
- Company type: Private company
- Industry: Investments
- Founded: 1975; 50 years ago
- Founder: Mário Garnero
- Headquarters: São Paulo, Brazil
- Area served: Brazil
- Key people: Mario Garnero
- Products: Investment banking, Investments
- Website: www.brasilinvest.com.br

Brasilinvest Group is a Brazilian private development bank and investment company that was established in 1975 by Mário Garnero. The company is headquarters in São Paulo and has investments in a number of major businesses in Brazil.

As of 2008, the Brasilinvest Group ranked number 128 on the annual report of Brazil's largest corporations, published by Brazilian financial magazine Gazeta Mercantil.

== History ==
Brasilinvest was established in 1975 by Mário Garnero.

The 1980s began with drastic changes in Brazilian politics, with the aim of controlling inflation and the balance of payments deficit. In 1983, NEC Brasil, the Brazilian subsidiary of NEC Corporation (Nippon Electric Company) could not operate in Brazil because of Brazilian government's rules to protect local industries. In order to comply with the government measures, Brasilinvest group, through a joint venture, took over the controlling interest in NEC Brasil.

In 1985 the Central Bank of Brazil liquidated Brasilinvest. The irregularities found led the then Minister of Finance, Francisco Dornelles, to seek the preventive detention of Mário Garnero. The Communications Minister Antônio Carlos Magalhães suspended the payment of a debt of equivalent US$30 million from a contract to supply equipment already delivered by NEC Brasil to Telebrás. The transfer of NEC Brasil's shareholding control from entrepreneur Mário Garnero to publisher Roberto Marinho was completed in October 1986.

Over its history, the Brasilinvest Group consolidated dozens of economic projects from the transference and nationalization of ITT-Standard Electric SA and NEC, in the 1980s, to the assessment, in the 1990s, of the new partnership structure of Cofap and Bombril. It also assisted the stock-option restructuring of Fiat, the creation of Volkswagen’s leasing unit, as well as Varig and Volkswagen's rent-a-car units.

In the agribusiness sector, it has assisted the process of industrial installation of Boehringer in Suape Port, Pernambuco, and took part in enterprises such as Celupa (Paper and Cellulose Industrial Company Guaiba) and Mellita.

Brasilinvest has been a pioneer in discussing themes such as globalization and its effects on the Brazilian market along with supporting important conferences and events aiming to promote investment opportunities in Brazil. Particular distinction included the Salzburg Conference in, Austria (1975), and events in the Principality of Monaco (2000), Paris (2003), Rome (2004), London (2005), and in New York City (2007-2008). It has also led business initiatives in the Asian market, with the increase in commercial and capital exchange through the establishment of the first Brazilian representation office in Beijing, China, in 1981.

Brasilinvest has a history in real estate projects, being responsible for the development of over 3.7 million square meters of improvements in the State of São Paulo, as well as important real estate projects in the United States and Europe.

== See also ==
- Beyond Citizen Kane
- Economy of Brazil
- Volkswagen do Brasil
