= Mário Garnero =

Brazilian banker

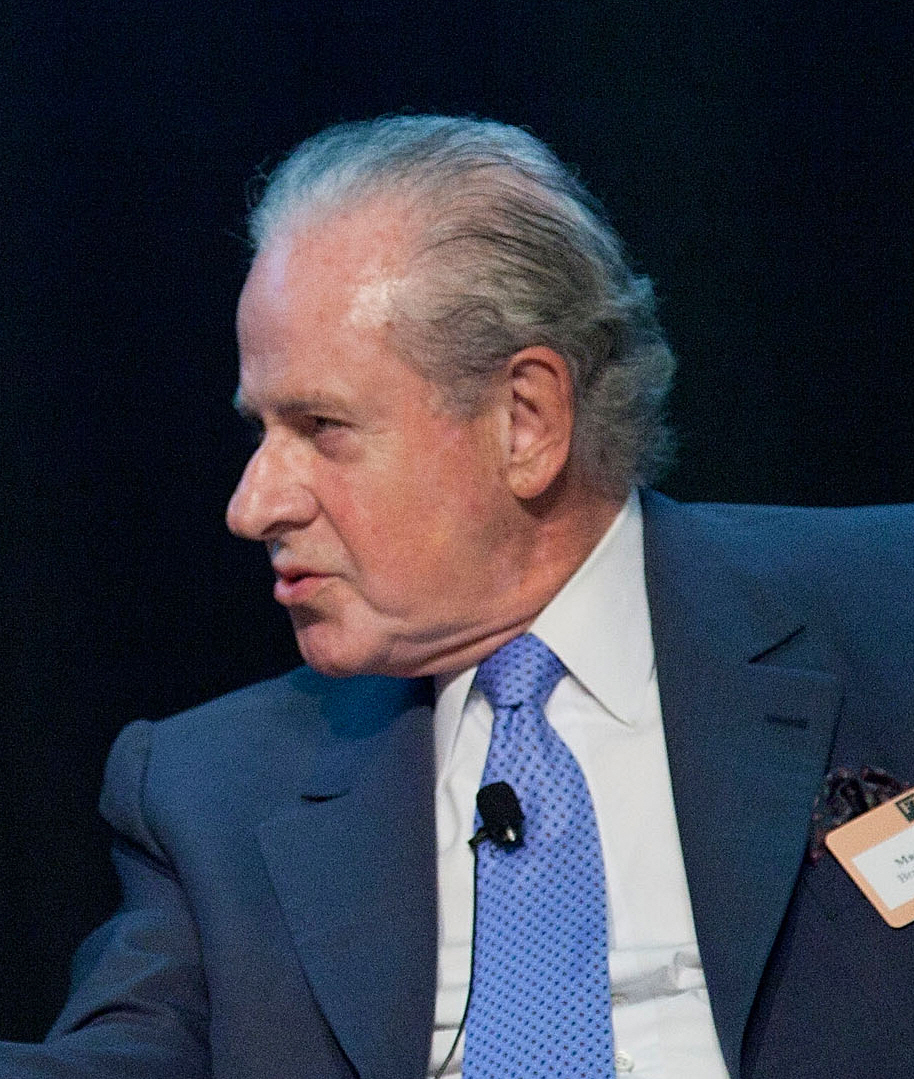
Mario Garnero at the Brazil's China Connection by Financial Times, in New York, October 2011

Mário Garnero (Campinas, 15 August 1937) is a Brazilian banker and entrepreneur.

== Biography ==
Born in 1937, Mário Garnero obtained a law degree from the Pontifical Catholic University of São Paulo (Pontifícia Universidade Católica de São Paulo) where, as a student, he presided over the "Centro Acadêmico 22 de Agosto" (the University's Law Students' Association).

== Brasilinvest ==
Mario Garnero is chairman of the board and principal shareholder of the Brasilinvest Group, a business organization established in 1975 as a private business agency operating along the lines of a classic "banque d'affaires" or merchant bank, which has a present net worth estimated in US$700 million. The establishment of the Brasilinvest Group, which has already attracted investments in the range of US$12 billion to Brazil, gathers partners from 16 different countries, some of which are still minority shareholders. In addition, Mario Garnero is president of Jurisul – the Interamerican Institute for Juridical Studies on Mercosur, president of Forum das Américas, and of the United Nations Association-Brazil.

After becoming director of Volkswagen do Brasil in 1979, Garnero chaired the National Automakers Association and subsequently chaired the National Confederation of Industries (CNI). He was one of the main supporters of that time's recently developed Brazilian Ethanol Program, named Proálcool.

As the Chairman of NEC do Brasil in the beginning of the 1990s, Mario Garnero was the pioneer in bringing the mobile phone technology to Brazil.

== UNA-Brazil ==
Throughout the years, Garnero became a personal friend of some of the most influential personalities in the world, including Secretary of the Treasury William E. Simon, US Secretary of Defense William Cohen, banker and statesman David Rockefeller and Jacob Rothschild, US Presidents Bill Clinton, George H. W. Bush, Gerald Ford and Valéry Giscard d'Estaing, German Chancellor Helmut Schmidt, among others. It is reported that Garnero once managed to work out a meeting between a delegation of 70 American businessmen and Ernesto Geisel, Brazil's President during the late 1970s, which brought a major wave of foreign investment to Brazil. Henry Kissinger was also a guest of his during the difficult years of Brazil's foreign debt negotiations. More recently, in 1996, it was President George H. W. Bush who came to Brazil under Garnero's invitation.

Apart from his business, this is a kind of "private diplomacy" that few people carry out like Garnero. Back in 1965, he took the initiative of inviting Senator Robert F. Kennedy to visit Brazil. As a result of Kennedy's visit, Mario Garnero decided to found an institution to debate environmental and hemispheric issues in the Americas, which happened in 1978, with the creation of Fórum das Américas, Brazil's pioneer "think tank" on democracy and regional economic integration.

These initiatives are added to the creation in 1998 of the United Nations Association-Brazil, following a meeting in New York City between Mario Garnero and UN Secretary-General Kofi Annan, who later visited São Paulo under the invitation of Fórum das Américas. UNA-Brazil is part of a group of similar institutions to be found in 115 countries, working as a bridge between the United Nations, its principles and values, and the Brazilian civil society.

As chairman of UNA-Brazil, he supported the media coverage by Brazil's most important newspaper of the Independence Process in East Timor, that brought to the attention of a large Brazilian audience the popular consultation in that Asian Portuguese-speaking territory, approved by the UN Security Council, that eventually led to the independence of that country from Indonesia. He also led the campaign throughout Brazil so that José Gregori could be elected to the United Nations Human Rights Award given in 1998.

== Publications ==
Garnero is the author of several publications, including Brazil in the World—Views on Brazil's Role in the Global Market (2008), Tough Deal (1988), The Imperative of Dialogue (1983), Why I Do Believe (1983), Energy: The Future is Today (1980) and Salzburg Letter (1975). His most recent book, JK, The Courage of Ambition, describes Garneo's appreciation of the personality and legacy of Juscelino Kubitschek, who was president of Brazil in the late 1950s and to whom Mario Garnero was a close friend and collaborator while still a young student leader.

== Father of the Ethanol Car ==
In the year of 1979 Mario Garnero held the position of director for Industrial Relations of Volkswagen Brazil and was subsequently appointed president of the National Association of Automotive Vehicle Manufacturers (ANFAVEA). 1979 was a crucial year for the Brazilian economy as the petroleum crisis pushed the federal government to consider imposing a ration on gasoline use which would ultimately mean disaster for the sales in the automotive industry. Garnero, as president of ANFAVEA, visualized the car empowered by ethanol as the only solution for the ongoing fuel crisis and took the first step for its implementation on a national scale.

Initially, Garnero convinced and got the approval of the presidents of the four major automobile producers in Brazil—Joseph O'Neill, president of Ford do Brasil, Wolfgang Sauer, president of Volkswagen, Joe Sanchez, of General Motors, and Silvano Valentino, of Fiat—to establish the audacious goal of producing 1 million cars moved by ethanol, which at the time corresponded to the entire automobile production of the preceding year. The quartet, under Garnero's leadership, left behind any idea of competition to unite themselves around the historic objective of transforming the fleet of cars from gasoline to ethanol. Afterward, Garnero elaborated together with Brazil's National Industry Confederation (CNI) a complete business plan which sanctioned the possibility of the production of 1 million cars moved on ethanol, thus eliminating any technical doubts on the feasibility of the process.

Garnero then produced a document which contained the signatures of over 800 of the most prominent leaders of the Brazilian economy, all in support of the production of the ethanol empowered automobile. The private sector by that time was entirely mobilized. Finally, Garnero persuaded his friend and president of the Republic, General João Batista Figueiredo, to engaged himself in the cause and launch the "One million ethanol cars" operation, which conveyed governmental support to the ethanol and sugarcane producers in order to guarantee the sufficient availability of ethanol fuel and also to the automotive industry in order to be thoroughly equipped, in a period of only four months, for the transformations caused by the substitution of gasoline by ethanol.

Three years later and 90% of Brazil's new automobiles were consuming ethanol fuel, notably cheaper than gasoline. Mario Garnero still today is called the father of the ethanol car in the private initiative, remembered by his contribution for the implementation of over 1 million ethanol cars while president of the National Association of Automotive Vehicle Manufacturers and also for his belief in the future of alternative energy.
