= Houmt El Souk =

Houmt Souk حومة السوق
- Municipality
- Houmt Souk
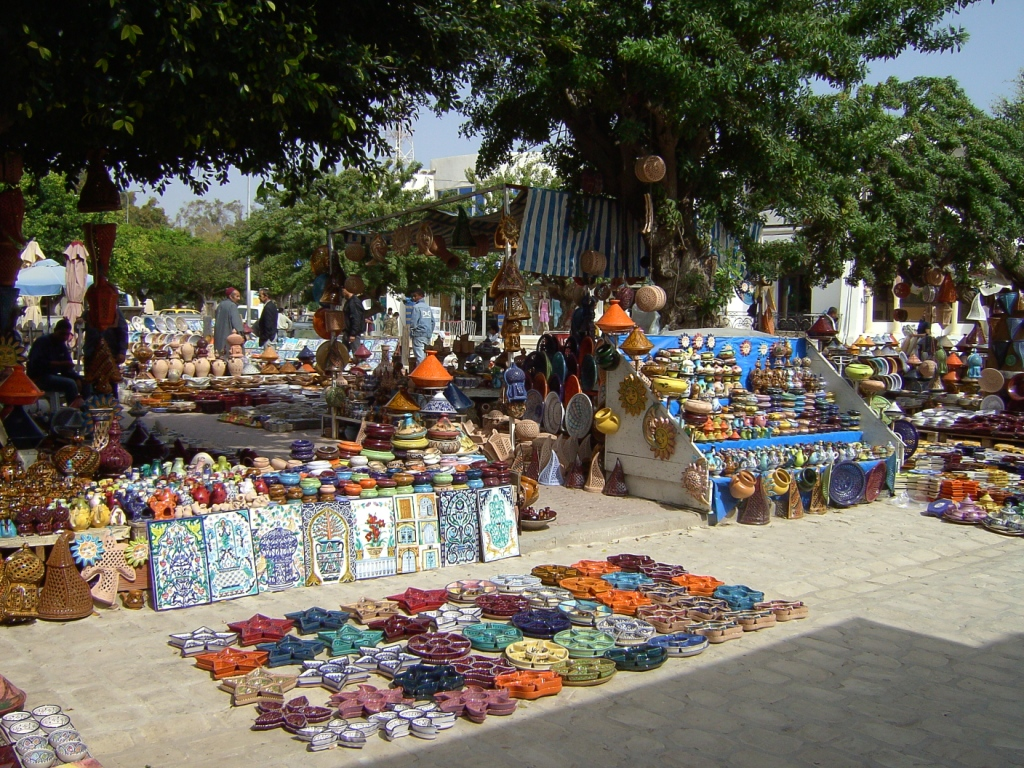
- Souk selling pottery in Houmt Souk
- Nickname: Houmt Soug
- Location in Tunisia
- Coordinates: 33°52′N 10°51′E
- Country: Tunisia
- Governorate: Medenine Governorate
- Founded: Late 14th century

Government
  - Type: Municipal
  - Mayor: Houcine Jrad

Area
  - Total: 162.8 km^{2} (62.9 sq mi)
  - Land: 162.8 km^{2} (62.9 sq mi)
- Elevation: 7 m (23 ft)

Population (2023 estimate)
  - Total: 89,228
  - Density: 548/km^{2} (1,420/sq mi)
- 1.6% annual growth rate (as of 2023)
- Demonym(s): mel soug Some sources refer to them as Sougaji (English: From souk)

Ethnicity
  - Major ethnic groups: Arab-Berber and North African origins
  - Minorities: Maltese Jewish

Population Census Based on the 2024 census
  - 0-9 years: 13,680
  - 10-19 years: 11,199
  - 20-29 years: 12,141
  - 30-39 years: 12,744
  - 40-49 years: 10,100
  - 50-59 years: 7,877
  - 60+ years: 8,163
- Time zone: UTC+1 (CET)
- Postal code: 4122, 4180, 4181
- Area code: +216 75
- ISO 3166 code: TN-82

UNESCO World Heritage Site
- Part of: Djerba: Testimony to a settlement pattern in an island territory
- Criteria: Cultural: v
- Reference: 1640-021
- Inscription: 2023 (45th Session)

Houmt Souk (Tunisian Arabic: حومة السوق Ḥūmet es Sūq), meaning literally: "The Market neighbourhood", is a commune and the main town of the island of Djerba, Tunisia. A popular tourist destination, it is best known for its traditional souk and the Aghlabid fortress.

It is located at approximately 20 km (12 miles) from Ajim and 22 km (14 miles) from El Kantara by the Roman road. It is also the chief town and a municipality with 89,228 inhabitants. The city's population is 75,904 inhabitants as of 2024. The city developed on the old site of a Roman city called Gerba or Girba, and was the birthplace of two Roman Emperors, Trebonianus Gallus and his son Volusianus.

== History ==
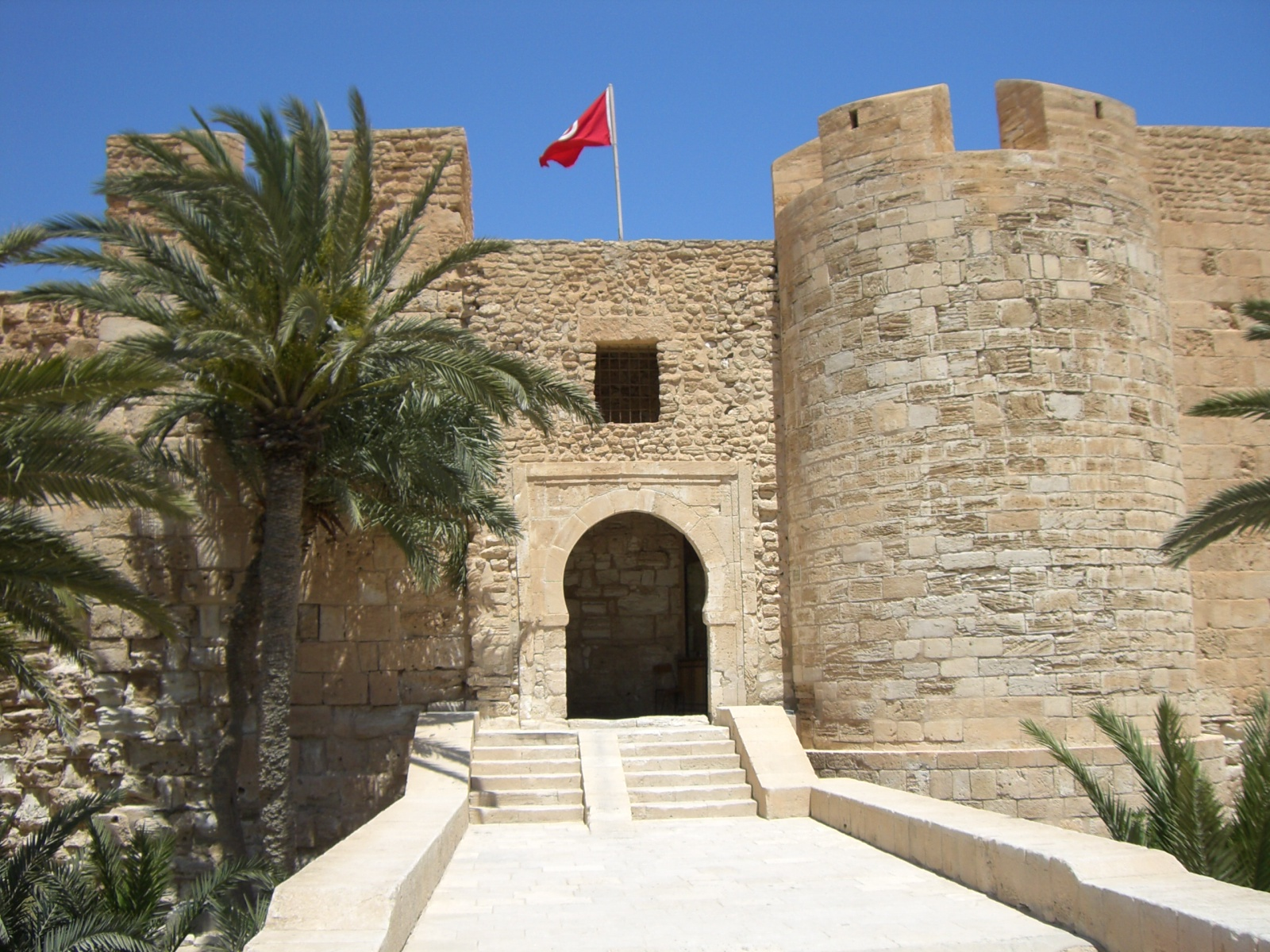
Bordj el Kebir fort

The city as it is today developed on the site of an ancient Roman city called Gerba or Girba, which shared its name with the island. Many besides the Romans lived there, including Numidians, Punics, Arabs, Spanish, and Turks; the town was also home to many merchants and pirates for many years. The Battle of Djerba took place in the northern part of the city. Close to the fort is a large village which served as a market; cattle and woolen cloth were traded there, as were dried grapes. The name of the city dates back to the eighteenth century, after it was mentioned in a letter by Sheikh Muhammad bin Youssef al-Masabi. Under the French protectorate (1881–1956) the island was divided into twelve sheikhates. French soldiers entered the town on 28 July 1881, and it remained a garrison until 1890, when its administration passed to civil French authority. In 1956, upon Tunisian independence, it became the capital of Djerba.

== Geography ==
Houmt Souk is located on a plain on the northern coast of Djerba. There is an artesian well, called Bir Erroumi, 767 m deep, which was dug under French rule. The city is divided into 4 sectors, Taourit, Boumellel, Essouani and Ejjouamaâ, while the rest of the municipality is divided into 7 sectors, Mellita, Hachène, Fatou, Mezraya, Cedghiane, Erriadh and Oualegh. The climate of the city is moderate, with a semi-arid tendency, and receives a breeze from the sea in summer.

== Architecture ==
Due to the density of the city center, its architectural character sometimes differs from that of the rest of the island. The typical menzel may especially be noticeably different; in addition, a new architectural style in which the courtyard is missing may be seen in some more modern houses. Dominant colors remain sharp white for masonry and sky blue for doors and windows. The city has several small streets connected by arcades, and there are a number of covered souks like that of Errbaâ, or the more recent Central Market.

Fondouks in town, dating back several centuries, often follow the same building style; a generally square courtyard with a group of stores may be found at ground level, along with a door with a heavy lock. This is sometimes joined by an attic window in the area were goods were stored. Animals, carts and equipment were sheltered in the yard. The first floor, reached by a single staircase, has a gallery supported by columns and arches; this is often the point of access for a number of rooms or storerooms. Many such buildings may still be seen in the downtown area, where they have been turned into hotels and youth hostels; some have even become tourist malls. The coastal area, formerly deserted, is becoming increasingly urbanized.

=== Religious buildings ===
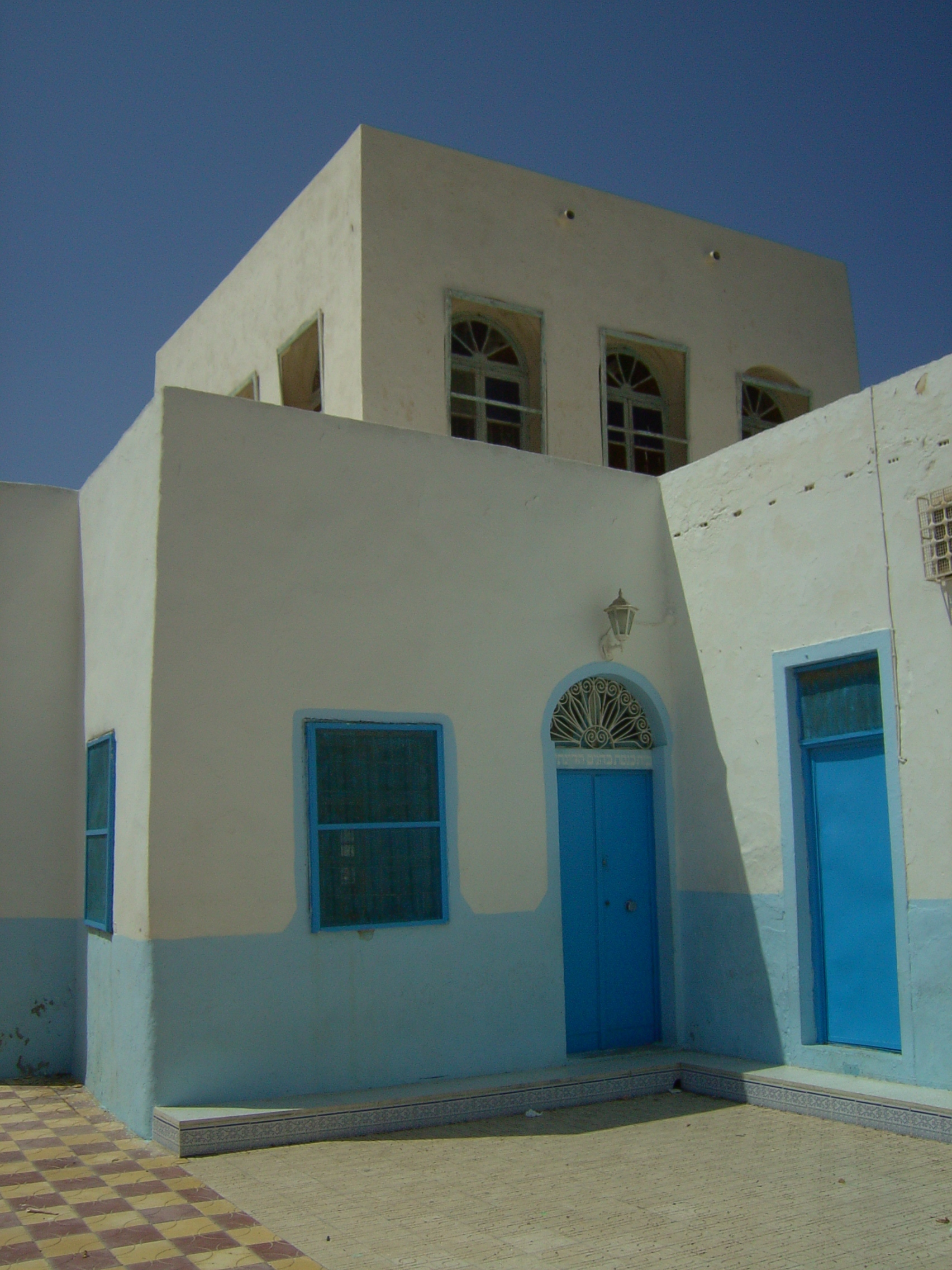
Jewish synagogue

As befits a Muslim country, mosques are numerous in the city, and their architecture varies greatly. Several are built in a style native to the island, among which is the Jemaâ El Ghorba (literally mosque from abroad) of the Maliki rite. The Jemaâ Ettrouk (mosque of the Turks), of the Hanafi rite, dates back to the 18th century and is equipped with a minaret typical of Ottoman style. There is also the Sidi Brahim El Jemni, built in 1674, with a roof with multiple vaults and a zaouia containing the tomb of a saint. These three mosques are classified as historic buildings. Sidi Bouakkazine, located near the public library, is built of centuries-old green tiles, and also houses a zaouia with a saint's tomb. Called Lella Gmira, this is visited most often by women suffering from infertility; they wash and light a candle there in the hope of gaining a blessing, and perhaps giving birth.

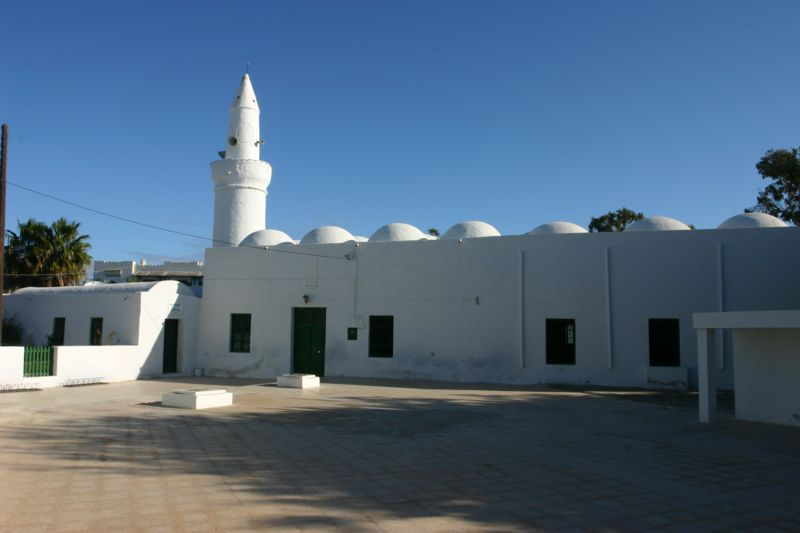
Mosque of the Turks

A little further out of town, on the road to Ajim, may be seen the Sidi Bouzid of the Ibadi rite. Sidi Salem and Sidi Youssef are located on the new speedway to the airport, and the Jemaâ Ejdid may be seen on the road to Mellita. Jamaâ Echeikh, Jemaâ El Bassi and Jemaâ El Guellal are in the same neighborhood in the south-east of Houmt Souk.

Legends surround a number of the town's mosques. Sidi Zitouni, located not far from Jamaâ Ettrouk and which houses another saint's tomb as well as the Museum of Arts and Popular Traditions, is one of them. According to lore, the mosque is inhabited by djinns that appear only in the early evening. Consequently, Djerbians will leave the mosque only at sunset. Another story concerns Jemaâ El Guellal: supposedly a potter in the eighteenth century put his pots, which had taken months to craft, on a cart to be taken to market. While on the road the cart overturned, dropping its contents to the ground. The potter nevertheless decided to save what he could, discovering with great astonishment that all his wares were intact. Upon selling them, and seeing divine intervention in the episode, he chose to build a mosque at the site of the accident.

Jamâa Tajdid, whose construction was begun in the nineteenth century and entrusted to Abou Messeouar, is on the road to Midoun. Messeouar completed the work with the help of his son.

There are several small synagogues in Hara El K'bira and Hara Sghira districts, the latter being a community of around 100 Jews. In addition, a Catholic church may be found in the center of town, and a Greek Orthodox structure is located near the port, by the hotel Lottos, one of the island's first hotels.

=== Borj El K'bir Fort ===
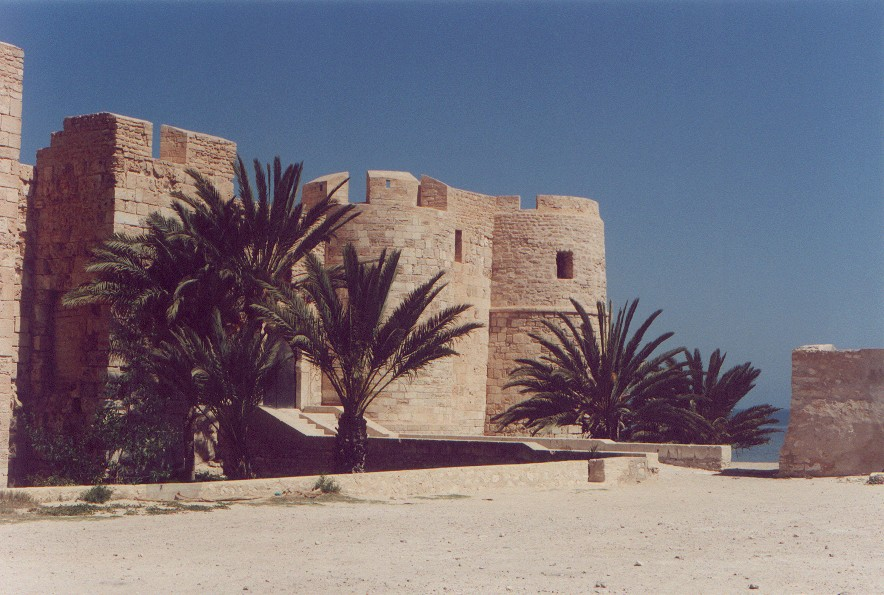
Murs du Borj El K'bir

The Borj El K'bir is a castle and fort that was constructed on the waterfront in 1432 under Sultan Abû Fâris `Abd Al `Azîz Al-Mutawakkil. It is also known as Borj El Ghazi Mustapha because it was added to significantly between 1560 and 1567, during the reign of the Ottoman Sultan Suleiman the Magnificent. A commemorative statue in marble, originally sealed in one of the fort's interior walls, is now on display at the Bardo National Museum in Tunis. Excavations have been made within the structure, revealing much of its history; some of the artifacts discovered are now on display inside one of the rooms of the fort. From the top of the walls may be had a panoramic view over the port; also visible from this location is the nine-meter-high obelisk which indicates the site of Borj-er-Rous, the Tower of Skulls, built using the bones of Dragut's enemies executed after his victory, in July 1560, against a coalition made up of soldiers from Spain, Naples, Sicily, Lombardy, Germany, France, and the Knights of Malta. The tower was conical in shape, 34 feet in diameter at its base. It was removed in 1848 under orders from the capital. Today the bones are buried in the Christian cemetery of the city. The obelisk which replaced the tower was constructed under the rule of France.

Just opposite the fort, behind the old city hospital, there exists a cistern, dating back to Roman times, which is used for the collection of rainwater.

=== Other buildings of note ===
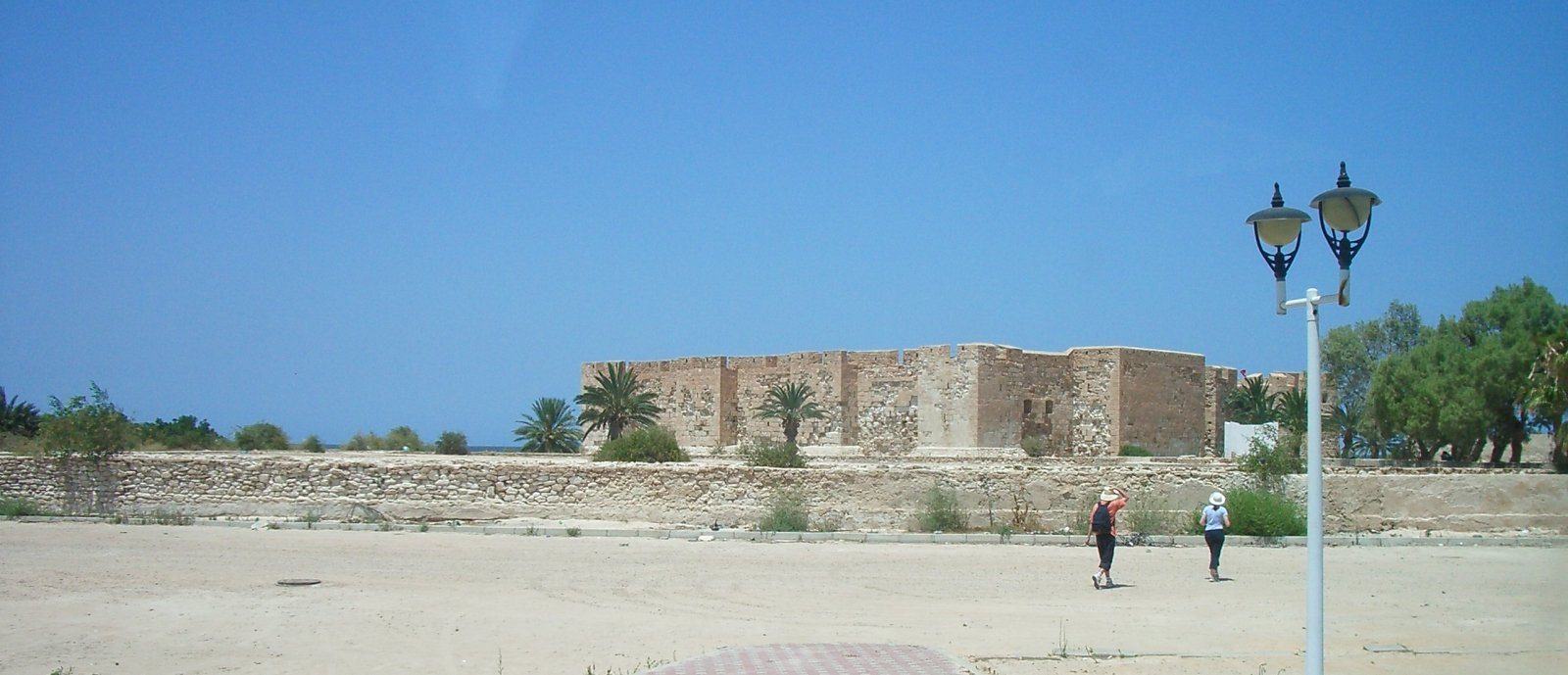
Bordj el Kebir

Among the other characteristic buildings, one can quote the fondouks, lodging warehouses for the goods. The cupola of the combatants (Goubbat El Moujahdine), near Jemaâ Ettrouk, is a small square construction, with wrought iron, which shelters three tombs that of venerated inhabitants of Houmt Souk and is regarded as a zaouïa. There is the Hammam El Barouni, a hammam (bathhouse) which goes back several centuries and which, renovated on several occasions, continues to be used. Old bakeries, workshops of weaving (of which the architecture is particular in Djerba) with their half-vaults and their triangular pediment of Greek style and the old wells (with their large wings) which were useful for the irrigation of the fields of barley, of sorghum and pulses also have a typical architecture. The Errbaâ souk, market hall formed in a labyrinth with the roofs in semi-vaults, gathered the craftsmen tailors, shoe-makers, jewellers. Its doors closed at the falling night and much of stores remained closed on Saturdays taking into account the high number of Jewish tradesmen and craftsmen who had their graves there. The market is currently very popular with tourists.

A large theatre in the open air, built in 2004 between the zone of the port and Borj El K' to bir, shelters the great cultural events including those of the annual festival of Ulysses. Houmt Souk counts several schools as well primary as secondary (of which several colleges and colleges) but also a post office (in a characteristic building going back to French protectorate), several banks, a public hospital and several private clinics, several pharmacies, a tourist bureau and a trade unions initiative. There is also several small hotels built under the French protectorate.

== Demographics ==
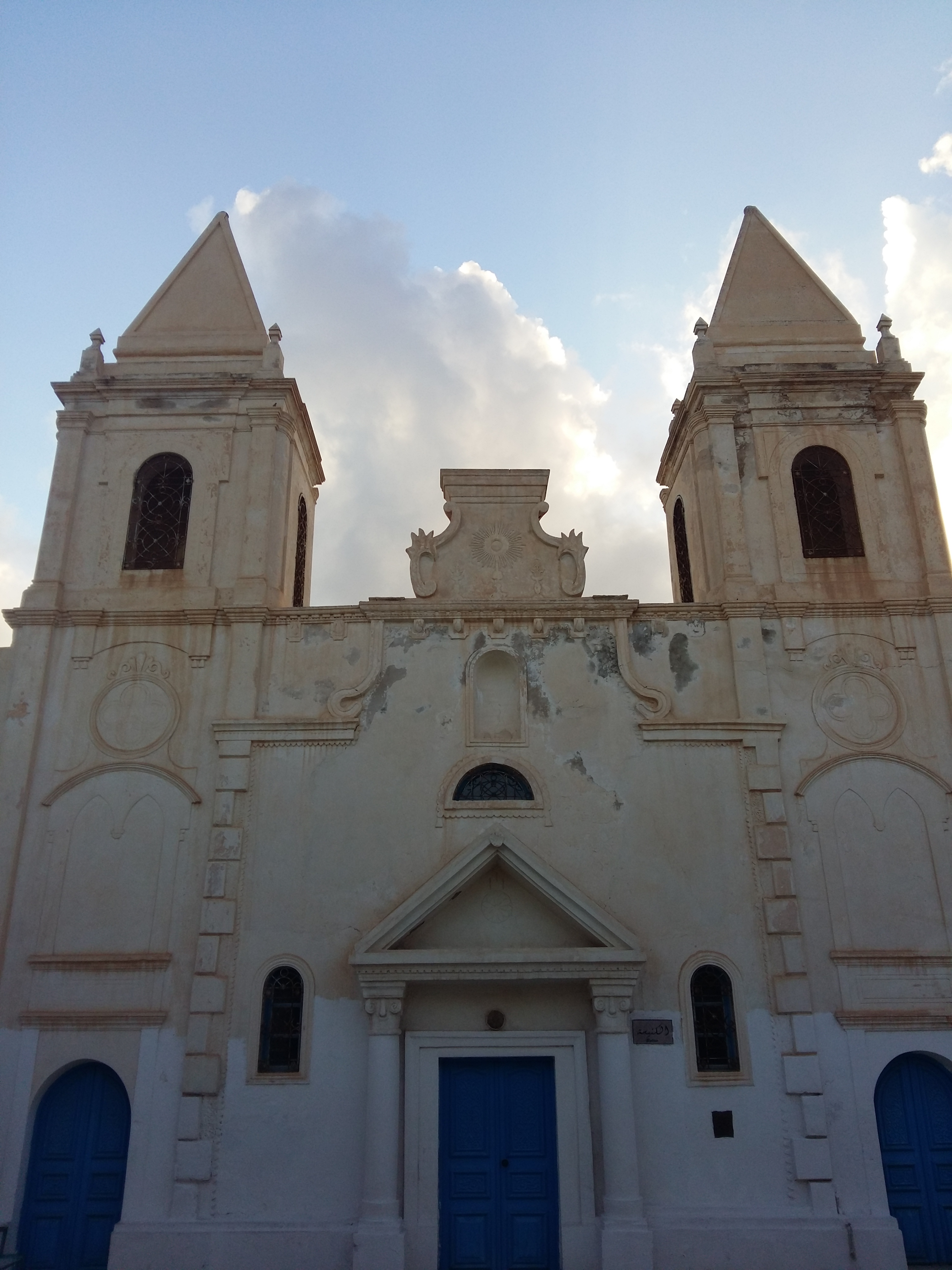
Saint Joseph Catholic Church in Houmt El Souk.

Houmt Souk is the most populated city of Djerba; it only shelters with it more of the third of the population of the island. Houmt Souk and its neighbourhoods have a very high density: it was already of 474 inhabitants per km^{2} in 1956 whereas the average of the island was of 127 inhabitants per km^{2} and that of the remainder of Tunisia of 27 inhabitants per km^{2}. Maltese, Muslims, Italians, French, Arab-Berber, Greeks, Jews and Christians (Catholic and Greek Orthodox) have lived a long time side by side in Houmt Souk. From the 1950s a migratory movement primarily turned towards France reduced the population considerably; European and Jewish inhabitants of Houmt Souk. Several thousand Jews were concentrated in Hara El K' will bira, a district formerly exclusively Jewish and where the density remains very high. This district saw many Muslim families coming from the south of Tunisia after the departure of Jewish families, and this especially after independence. One of the districts of Houmt Souk, called Houmet Ejjoumaâ, is inhabited in majority by families coming from Beni Khedache. These families have brought different traditions, including celebration of religious holidays. The Muslim population of Houmt El Souk is mostly Maliki Sunni.

== Culture ==
The coexistence of various ethnicities (in particular Sephardi Jews and black African) and of various religious beliefs contributed to the richness and the variety of the cultures and traditions of this locality. The island of Djerba is a true mosaic of cultures and traditions and even the accent of its inhabitants varies from one locality to another, thus the Houmt Souk accent is different from the other localities.

=== Museums ===
Houmt Souk contains a museum of arts which presents a panorama of Djerba history. Installed in an old a zaouïa built at the end of the 18th century to honour of Sidi Zitouni and Sidi Ameur, not far from the "Mosque from Abroad", it is possible to discover the folklore of the island, its traditions and its economy from jewels and colored glass, pottery, weaving looms, and the traditional costumes of various social groups, kitchen utensils, one workshop of pottery, and jars which were used to preserve foodstuffs such as barley, sorghum, olive oil or dried meat. These earthenware jars bear different names ( sefri, khabia' ', tass' ' or zir) and their opening depends on the intended products to be preserved there.

=== Clothes ===
The inhabitants of Djerba, in particular the women, wear traditional costumes which may also differ between locality. The women of Houmt Souk do not normally wear a hat contrary to the woman of Guellala, for whom the traditional hat is an important accessory. The woman of Houmt Souk typically drape themselves in a white dress, without embroidery. However, the veil often has different names and colors in other localities of island: and may be navy blue with small squares with Guellala or Midoun or embroidered white of red and yellow with Mahboubine or Mellita; and named fouta or hrem. The Jews of Houmt Souk, both male and female wear traditional clothes similar to those of the Muslim inhabitants but who can however be distinguished by a black band at the bottom of the trousers, known as a seroual arbi. With the interior, the woman of Houmt Souk typically wear a houli, multicoloured, made out of cotton or natural silk and increasingly in modern society out of synthetic fibre. Under this may be embroidered sleeves called hassara or khabbaia. The clothing of the men in Houmt Souk also differs from that of the Djerbiens of the other localities of the island.

=== Traditions ===
Much of the practices and the cultural traditions of the city are also different from those of the other localities. These include ceremonies of marriage, circumcision, religious holidays, etc. Traditionally, in new year the children of Houmt Souk went from house in house and sang typical songs (like ' ' khachia, khachiiti, waatini khachiiti... ' '), sometimes disguised as characters called Guerdellif and Aljia, which played a spectacle of song and dance and received gifts of money, dried fruits or confectionery. During the three days of Aïd el-Fitr, also called Arfa Kaddhabia, Arfa Es or Arfa will el-Kebira, the children enjoy a greater freedom: and typically receive gifts of money from their parents and visit the market, often in groups to buy toys, and items for the house particularly for the kitchen. During the new year the families of Houmt Souk still nowadays send to their married daughters a large meal, often dried meat (' ' kaddid' ') sheep or calf killed at the time of the festival, with hard-boiled eggs, chickpeas and broad beans. The woman who receives such a dish offers in return a gift of money for the giver.

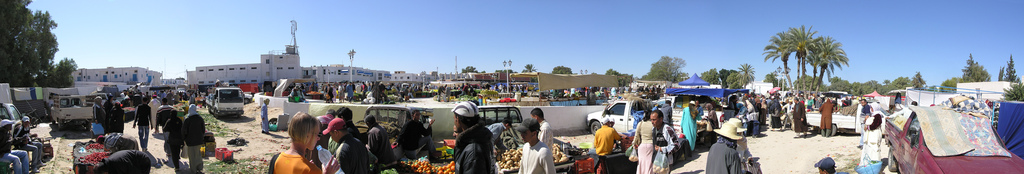
Marché de Houmt Souk

== Climate ==
Djerba has a hot-summer Mediterranean climate with mild, wet winters and hot, dry summers. The region experiences low annual rainfall, mostly between October and April, and enjoys a high amount of sunshine throughout the year.

=== Climate data ===
Monthly climate data for Houmt Souk
Month	Avg. High (°C)	Avg. Low (°C)	Precipitation (mm)
January	15.4	9.4	56
February	15.8	9.8	43
March	17.8	11.3	31
April	20.9	13.7	22
May	24.4	17.2	7
June	28.9	21.7	1
July	32.8	25.6	0
August	32.8	25.6	1
September	30.6	22.8	8
October	25.4	17.2	23
November	19.6	12.3	46
December	16.3	9.8	58

== Economy ==
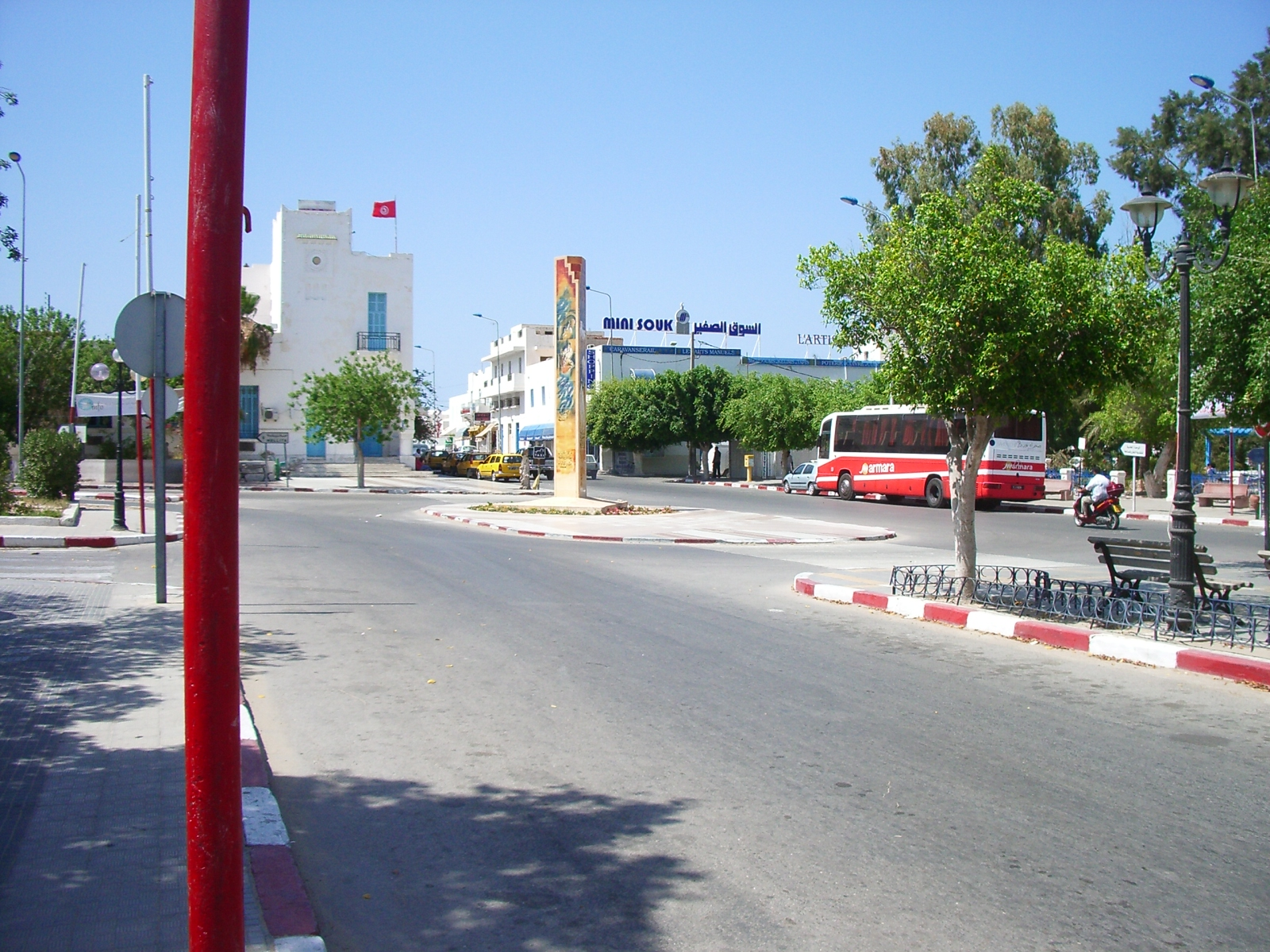

Tourism brought a certain prosperity to the local population. The city counts a multitude of restaurants and souvenir shops which attract a varied crowd daily, with tourists coming mostly from Europe. The Houmt Souk economy rests primarily on the trade of the markets. Houmt Souk is famous for its souk markets which attracts the inhabitants of the neighbouring areas as well as tourists. There are several specialised markets that existing catering for cattle, fish, fruit and vegetables, herbs and spices, goldsmiths, antique dealers, ironmongers, etc. On the island each important locality has its own market day such as, for example, Friday for Midoun or Sunday for Guellala whereas Houmt Souk has two of them: Monday and Thursday.

The Tunisian Craft industry employees many craftsman. If the artisanal activities are varied in the city, those related to wool are perhaps the most popular. One of the survivors of the Battles of Djerba said in 1560, according to a book reproduced by Charles Monchicourt “the inhabitants weave with fine wool of very beautiful baracans (covers) out of thin fabric, and decorate silk longer than an ordinary carpet”.

Weaving, performed on the island for over 1,000 years grew during the 19th century which turned it into one of the principal textile centres for wool in North Africa, and remains, in spite of the competition of textile industries an important activity in Houmt Souk The wool industry employs a larger number of families and the activities range from washing in sea water, washing in the sun, then come carding, spinning, dyeing and then weaving followed by marketing. It is an important source of revenue as well for women although carding and the spinning mill of wool are traditionally female activities and dyeing, weaving and marketing traditionally carried out by the men. The manufacture of carpet with embroidery is traditionally a female activity which developed considerably with the rise of tourism. The jewellery, formerly practised exclusively by the Jewish craftsmen (specialised especially in partitioned jewels encrusted with hard stones of various colours) is currently practised by young Muslim craftsmen. The work of leather, and in particular the shoe manufacture and the manufacture of bags in camel skins, as well as the basket making also developed with the new market offered by tourism.

Houmt Souk has one port, primarily oriented towards fishing. There are great quantities of terra cotta jars which are used for the fishing with octopus, a delicacy of Houmt Souk. The supply of engines and ensuring the traffic of the heavy goods and passengers between Tunis and Sfax is also performed at the port.

In 1964, Houmt Souk counted 297 boats and 746 "marins". The fish caught is sold fresh but certain species such as a small fish called ouzaf play a big role in the local cuisine. A fish cannery was built with the port to preserve the fish. In addition to fishing, the port is used nowadays for excursions towards the island of which is used as a refuge for migratory birds; in particular for pink flamingos as well as dolphins which can sometimes be observed off the city coastline. One of the traditions of Houmt Souk is the sale of fish through bidding and the shouting by the town crier. The fishermen thread fish fished in chains, and deliver them to the town crier after having been informed of the minimum price. The town crier, seated on a high chair, conducts the auction.

Due to the islands strong dependency on tourism, it experienced difficulties following the 2015 Sousse attacks, which saw tourism to the island, and Tunisia as a whole, plummet. Although tourism to Tunisian resorts had since recovered, the island too has been affected by the 2019-2020 COVID-19 pandemic which again has badly impacted the tourism industry.
