= Borj El Kebir =

Coordinates: 33°31′49″N 10°30′49″E

- Borj El Ghazi Mustapha
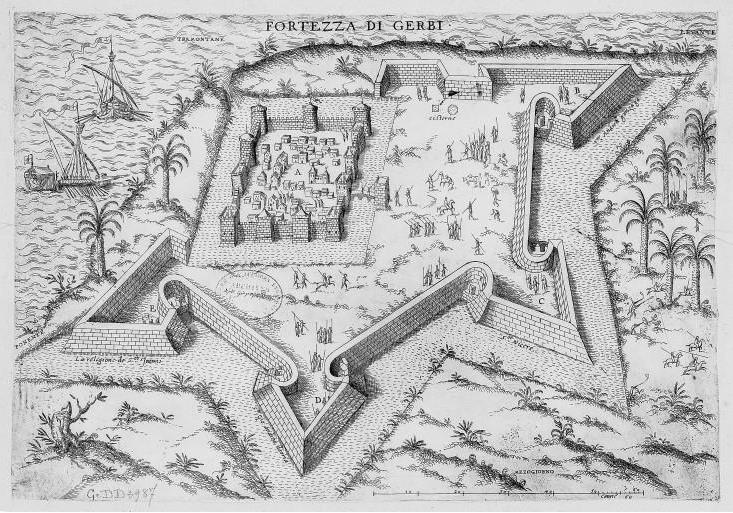
- Borj El Kebir (1599)

- Location within Tunisia

General information
- Architectural style: Moorish architecture
- Location: Houmt El Souk, Tunisia

Borj El Kebir, also known as Borj El Ghazi Mustapha, is an ancient castle in Houmt El Souk, Tunisia on the island of Djerba. It is the largest and best preserved local castle, and is one of the most visited historical sites on the island.

== Etymology ==
The name Borj El Ghazi Mustapha comes from the Qaid who settled in Djerba in 1559.

== Location ==
The castle is located in the north of Houmt El Souk near the fishing port.

== History ==
It was built in the end of the 14th century over the ruins of the ancient Roman city of Griba, after the deportation of the soldiers of Alfonso V of Aragon on the orders of the hafsid sultan of Tunisia. In 1450, the castle was extended. On 28 July 1881, during the French occupation, French troops settled in the castle.

In 1903, it became a property of the Tunisian authorities who gave it the status of a national historical monument on 15 March 1904 and transformed it into a museum. Restoration started in 1969 and was completed by the early 1980s.

== Description ==
The borj has a rectangular form.

Nowadays, the monument has two mausoleums: Sidi saad, and Ghazi Mustapha, for Ghazi Mustapha Bey.

== Gallery ==
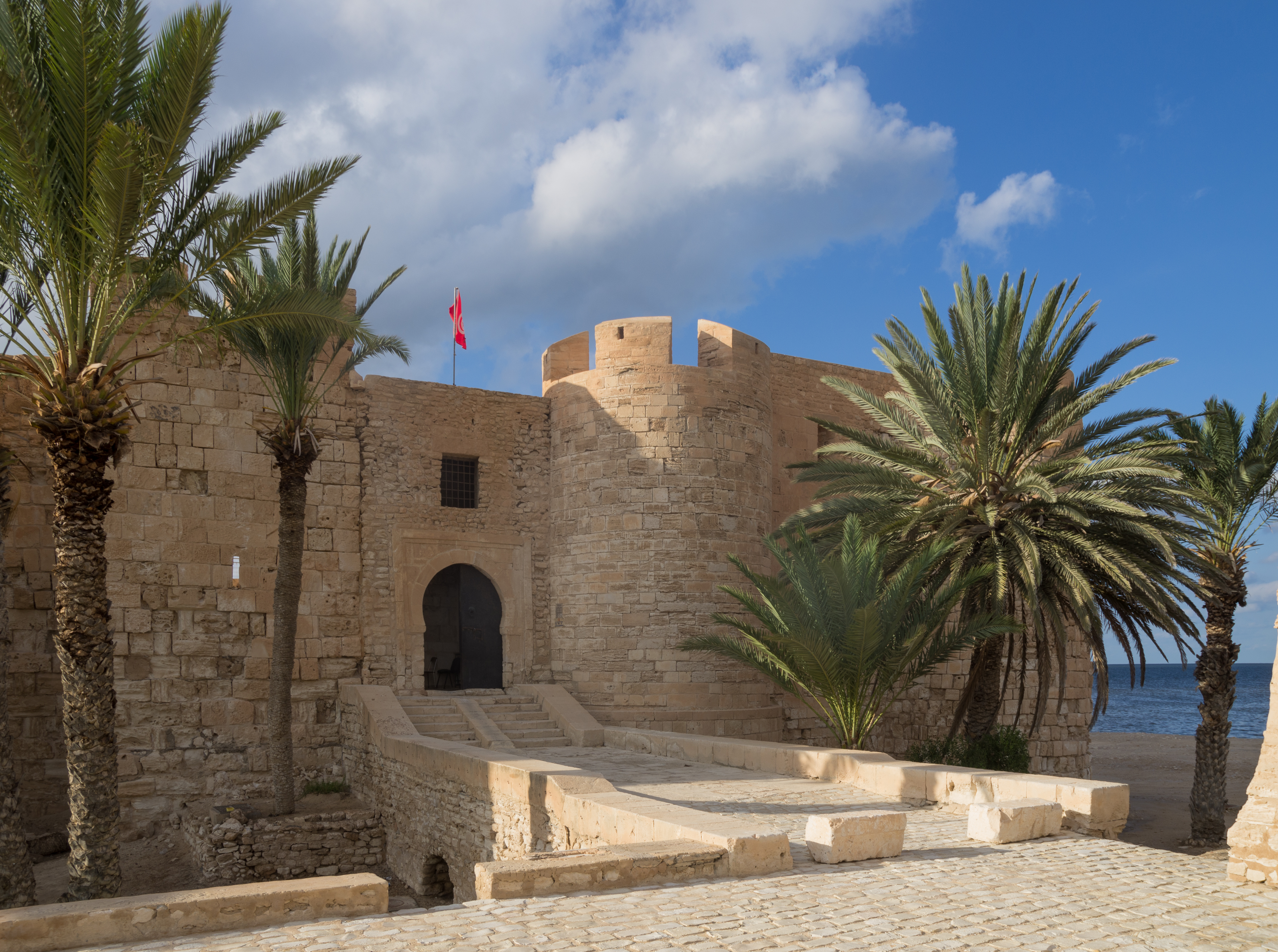
Entrance of castle

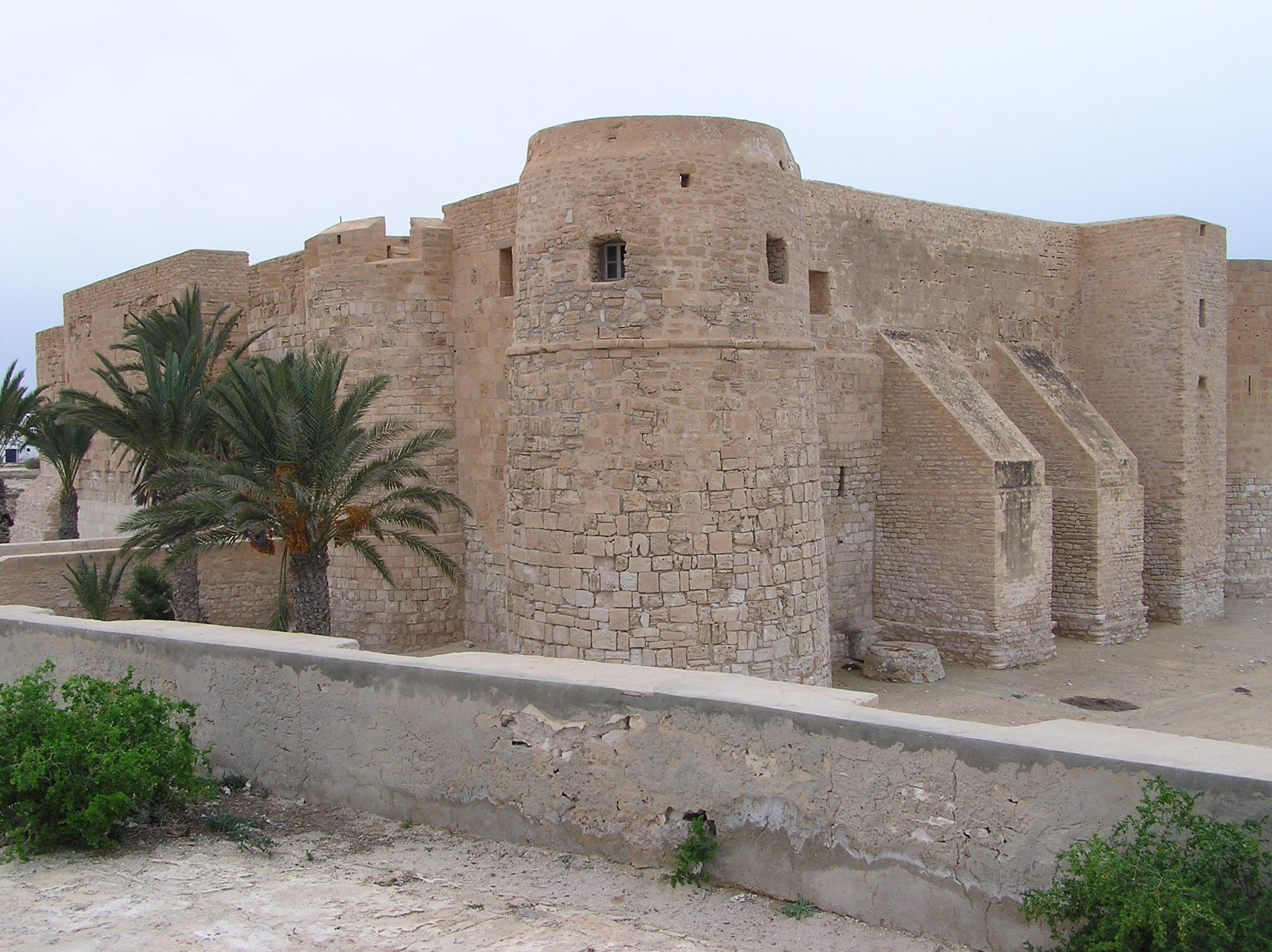
View of the walls

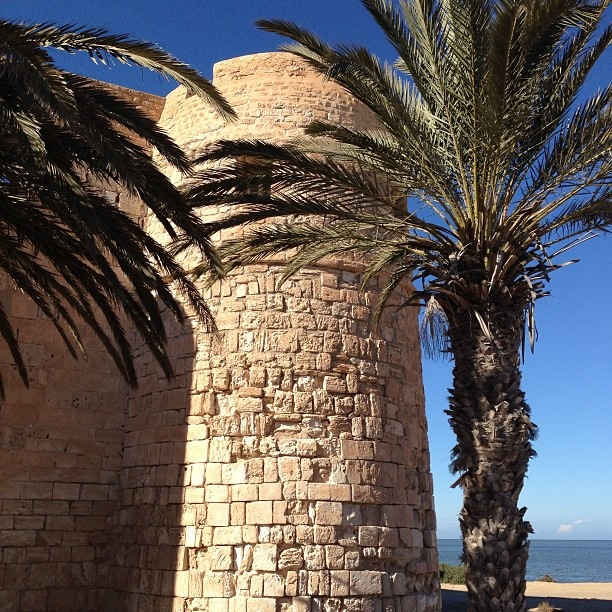
One of the towers of the castle

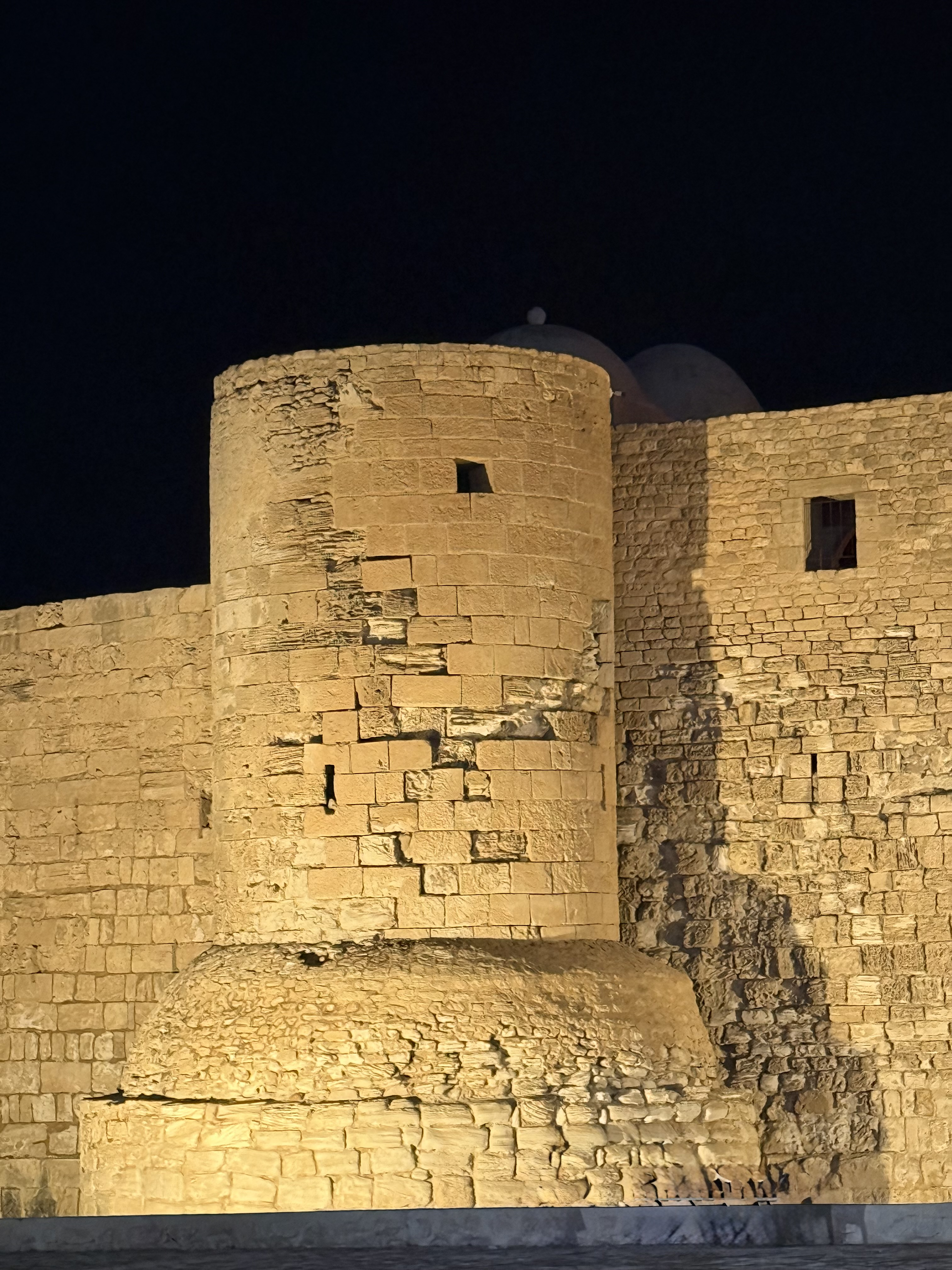
A close-up of one of the fortress towers illuminated at night, highlighting its architectural details

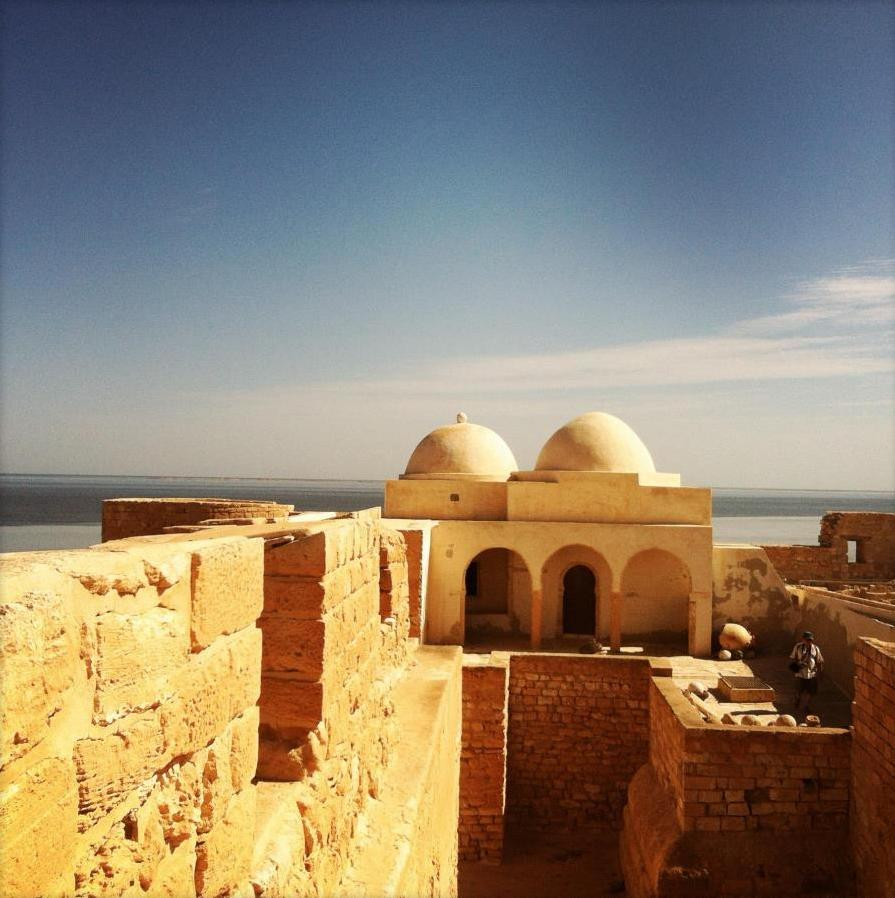
Sidi Saad and Ghazi Mustapha mausoleums

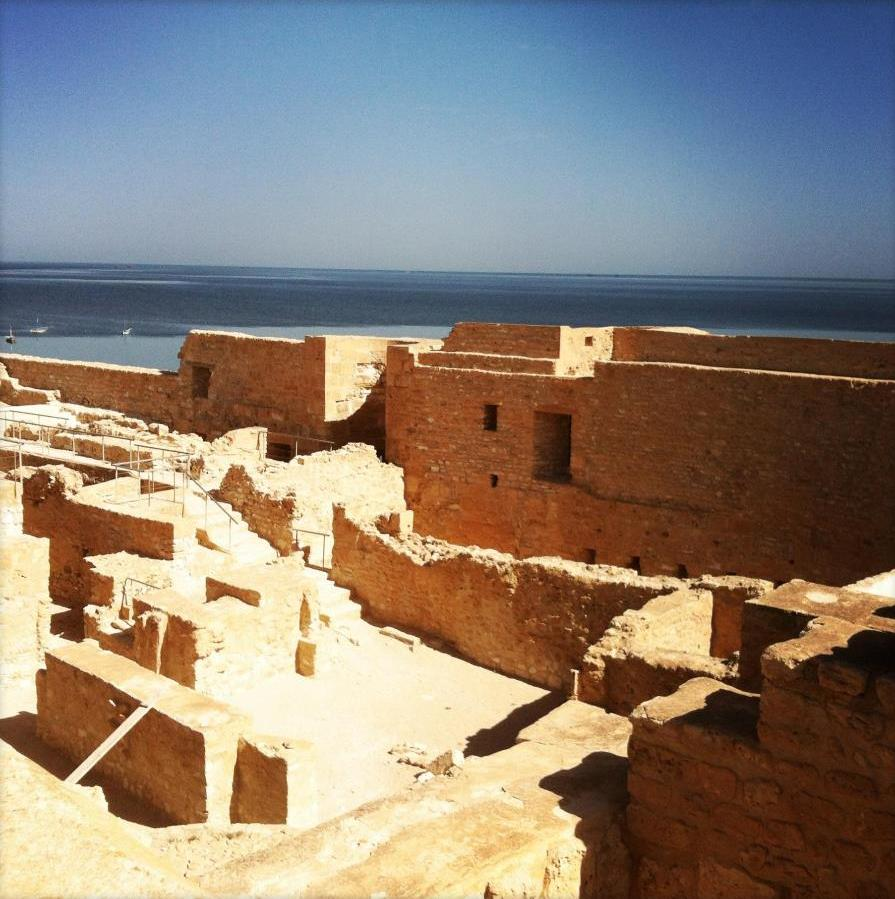
The hall

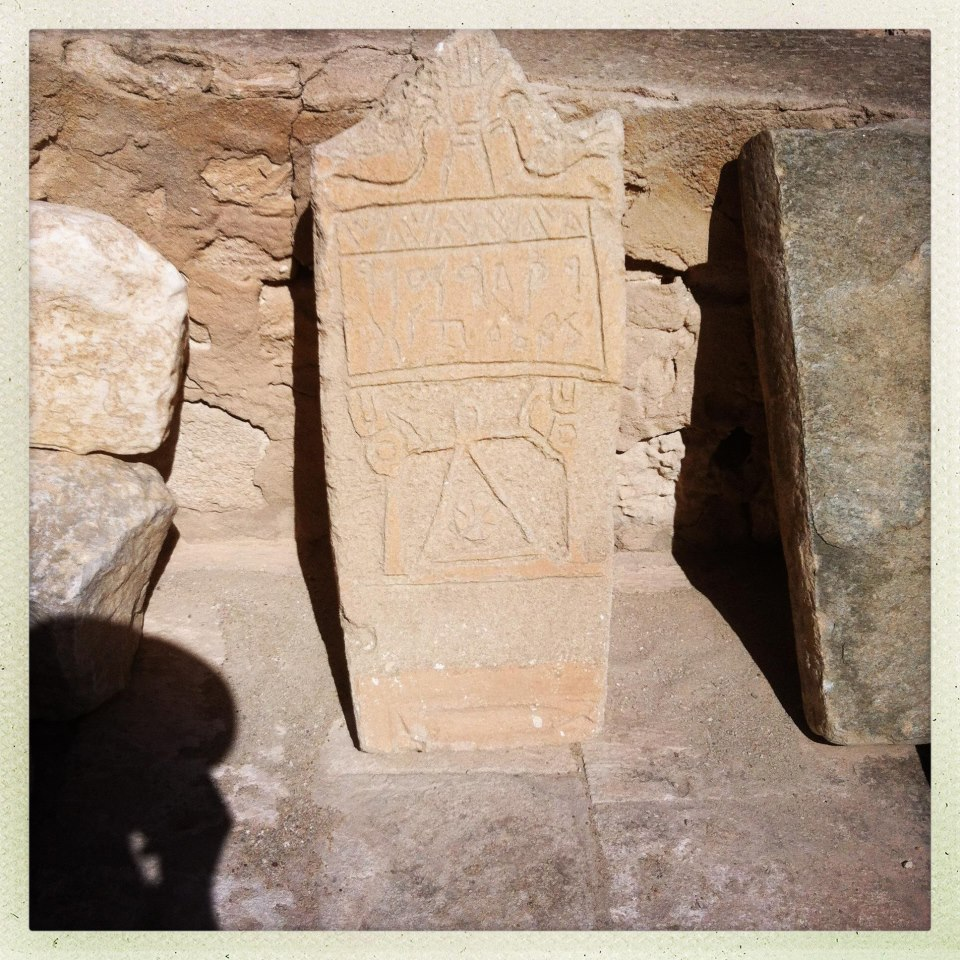
An old tomb found in 1975

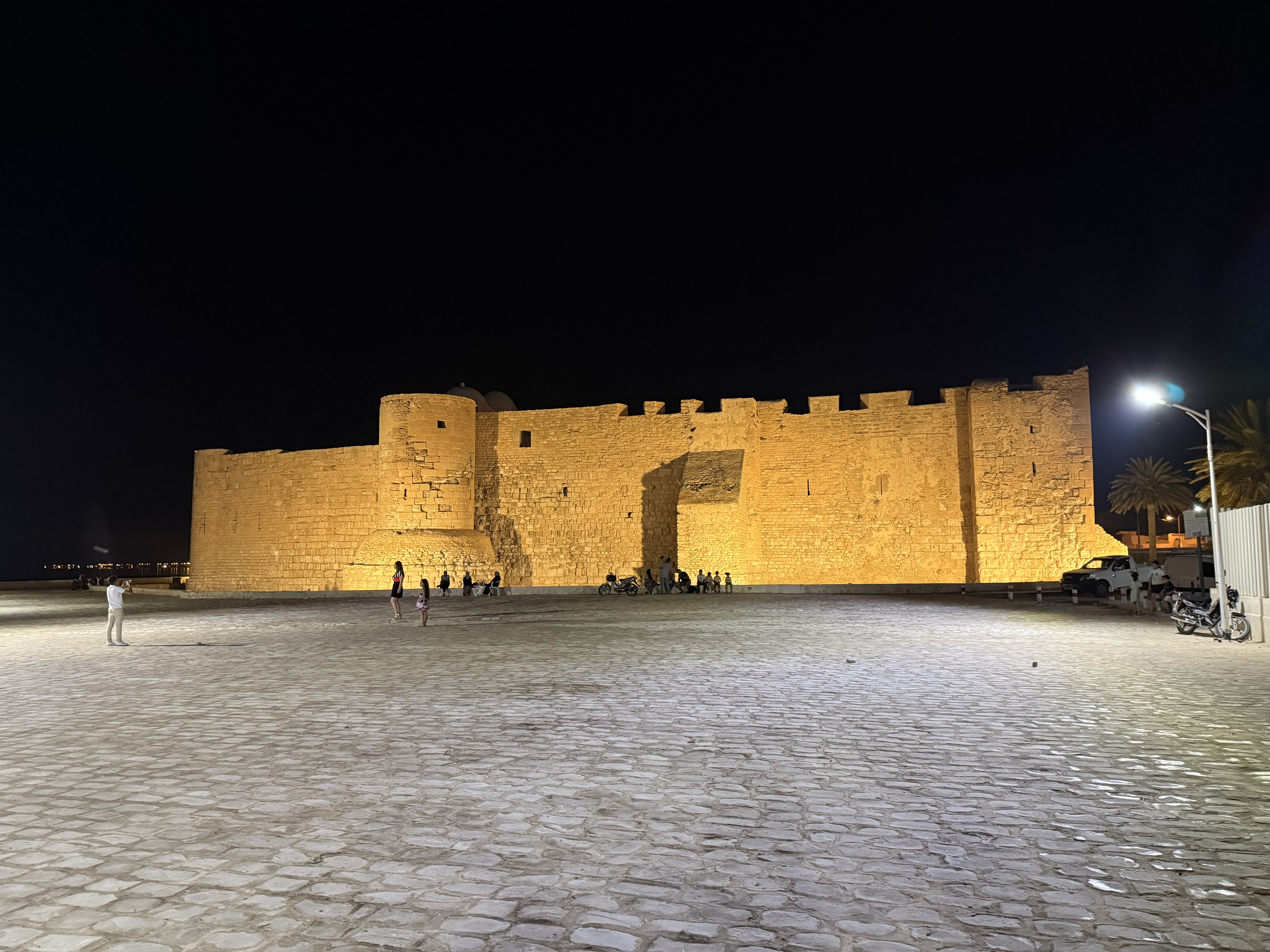
The fortress at night
