= Gozzo =

Gozzo is a surname. Notable people with the surname include:

- Michael Gozzo, American Track and Field Athlete
- Conrad Gozzo, American trumpeter
- Mauro Gozzo, American baseball player

== See also ==
- Gozo
