= Mellita =

Mellita may refer to:

- Mellita (echinoderm), a genus of sea urchins in the family Mellitidae
- Mellita, Djerba
- Mellita, Gharbi, Tunisia
